= Tourism in Turkey =

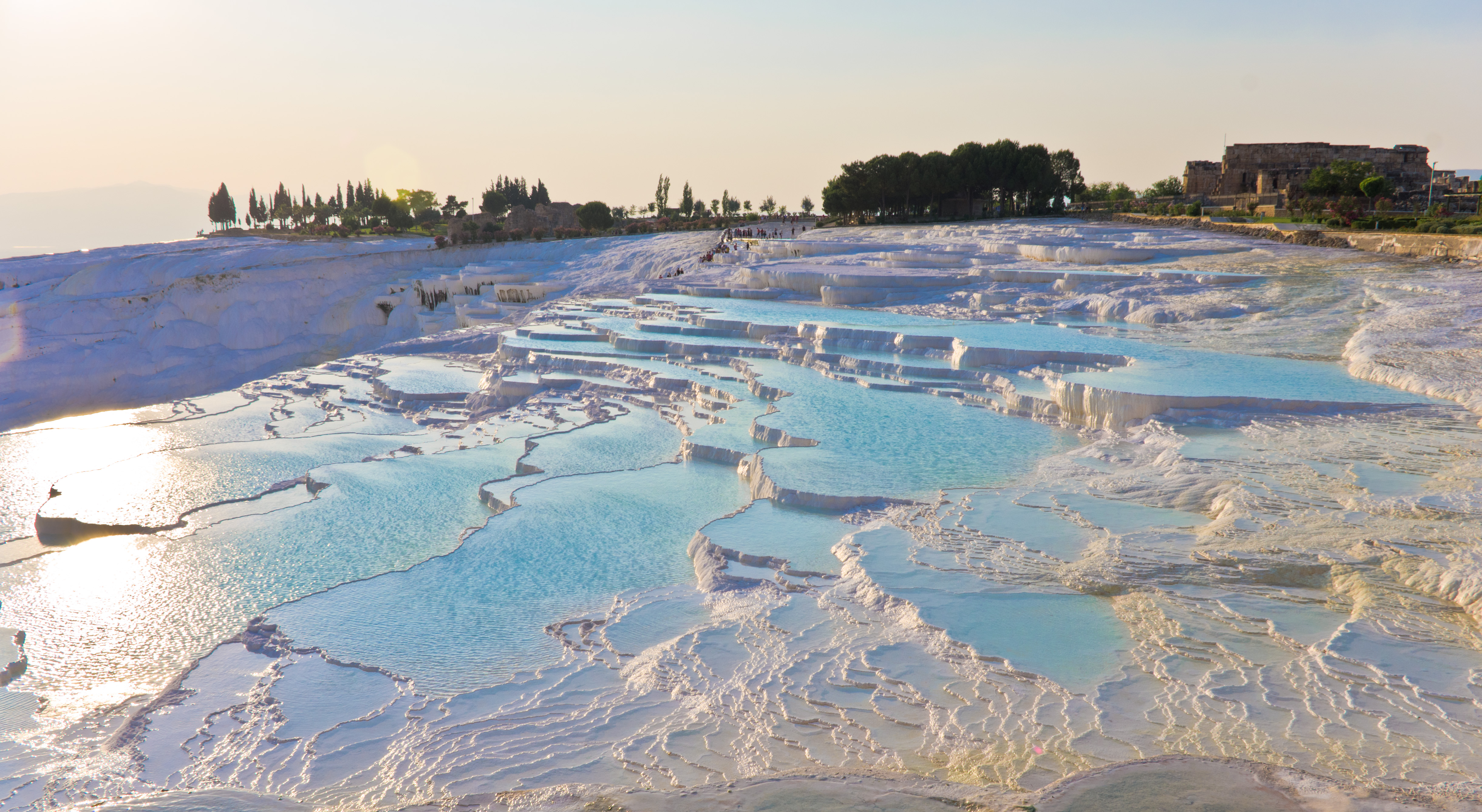
Pamukkale in Turkey is a World Heritage Site. Turkey has 622 national parks.

Tourism in Turkey is focused largely on a variety of historical sites, and on seaside resorts along its Aegean and Mediterranean Sea coasts. Turkey has also become a popular destination for culture, spa, and health care. In 2024, Turkey was the fourth most visited country in the world.

At its height in 2024, Turkey attracted around 52.6 million foreign tourists with a record tourism revenue of $61.1 billion. The total number fluctuated between around 41 million in 2015, and around 30 million in 2016. However, recovery began in 2017, with the number of foreign visitors increasing to 37.9 million, and in 2018 to 46.1 million visitors.

Yearly tourist arrivals in millions

== Destinations ==
=== Istanbul ===
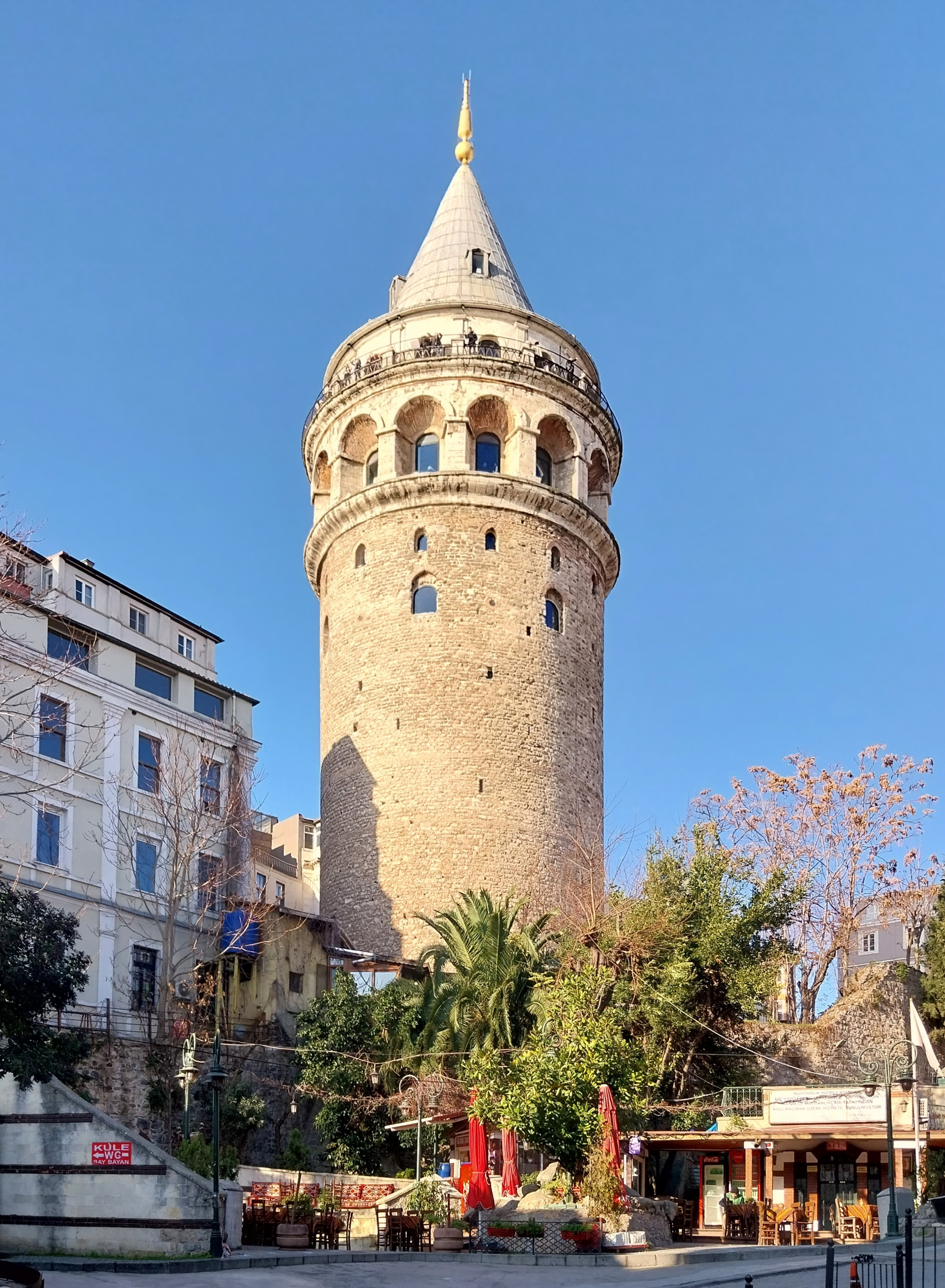
Galata Tower in Istanbul

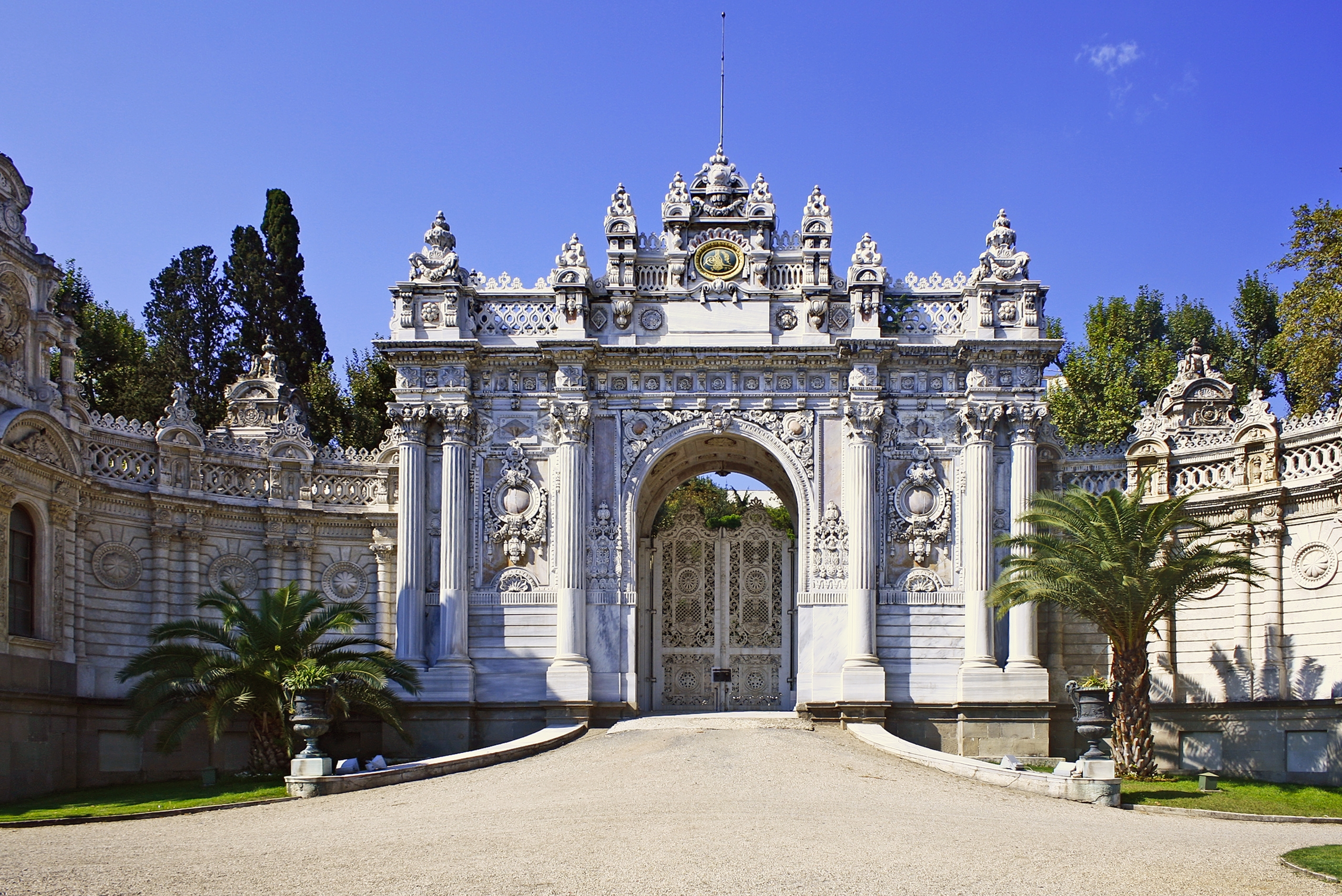
Dolmabahçe Palace is a popular tourism destination in Turkey.

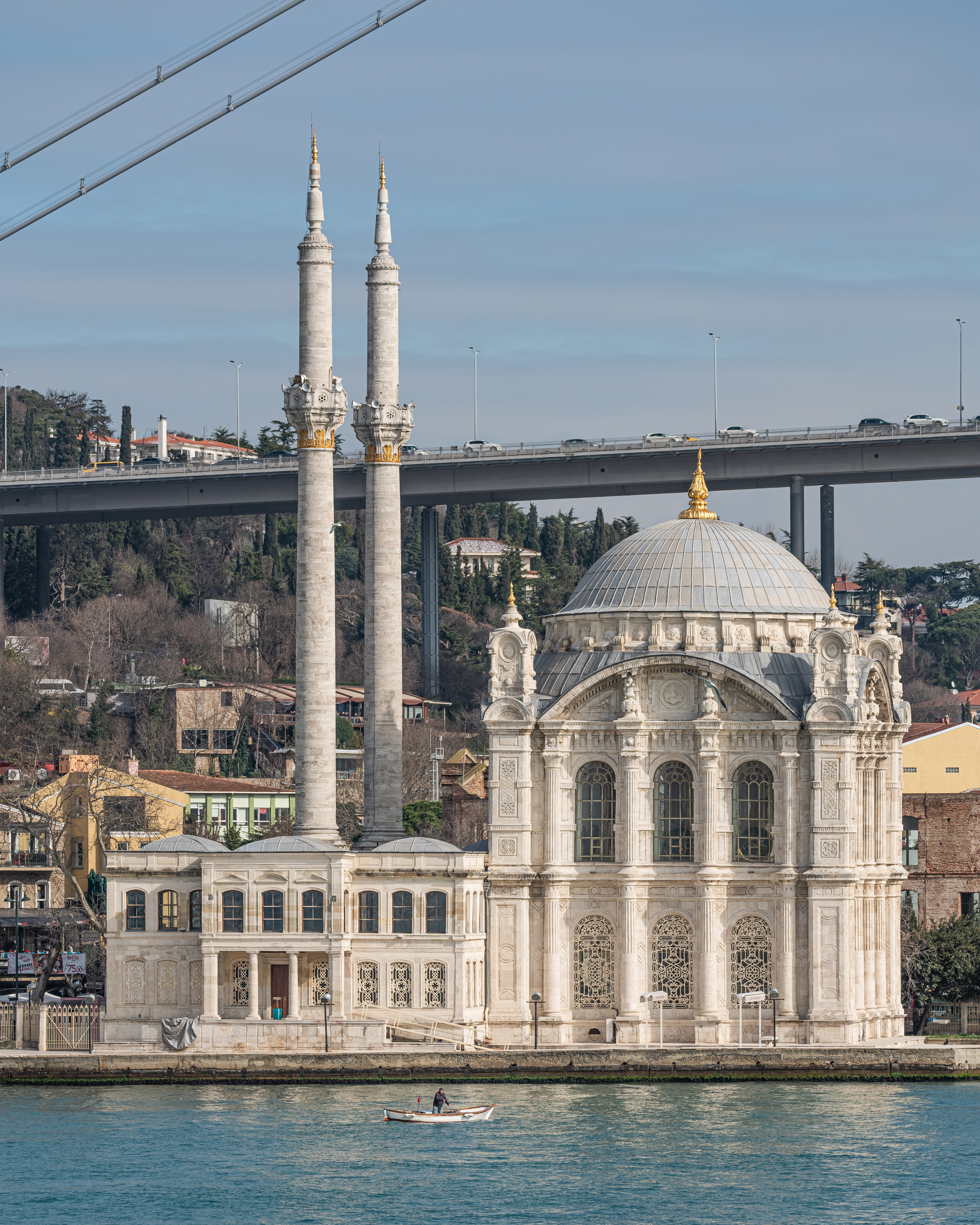
Ortaköy Mosque and the Bosphorus Bridge

Istanbul is one of the most important tourist spots not only in Turkey but also in the world. There are thousands of hotels and other tourist-oriented industries in the city. Turkey's largest city, Istanbul has a number of major attractions derived from its historical status as the capital of the Byzantine and Ottoman Empires. These include the Sultan Ahmed Mosque (the "Blue Mosque"), the Hagia Sophia, the Topkapı Palace, the Basilica Cistern, the Dolmabahçe Palace, the Galata Tower, the Grand Bazaar, the Spice Bazaar, and the Pera Palace Hotel. Istanbul has also emerged as one of the significant shopping destinations in Europe by hosting several modern malls and shopping centers, such as Kanyon, İstinye Park, Carousel, Galleria Ataköy, MetroCity, Akmerkez and Cevahir Mall, which is the biggest mall in Europe and seventh largest shopping center in the world. Other attractions include sporting events, museums, and cultural events.

In January 2013, the Turkish government announced that it would build the world's largest airport in Istanbul. The operation has an invested 7-billion euros and was planned to have the first part of a four-part plan completed by 2017.

=== Ankara ===
Ankara is the country's capital and second most populated city. It is rich with Turkish history and culture that have roots in the founding of Turkey along with the history of ancient civilizations. The most popular landmark is the Anıtkabir, a mausoleum for Atatürk, the founder of the Republic of Turkey. Another landmark would be the Museum of Anatolian Civilizations, a museum that possesses works from Paleolithic, Neolithic, Hatti, Hittite, Phrygian, Urartian, and Roman civilizations.

=== Izmir ===
Izmir is a city with historical and geopolitical importance in ancient civilizations such as Macedonia, Persia, Lydia, and the Ottomans. The city has a memorable history in the early years of Turkey as it was the main city that was affected by the Greco-Turkish War (1919–1922). Izmir is home to many ancient cities such as Ephesus, Pergamon, and Klazomenai. Besides historical significance, Izmir also possesses many locations for coastal tourism for international travelers. Frequently visited regions that have tourist beaches for local and international tourists would be Çeşme, Mordoğan, and Foça.

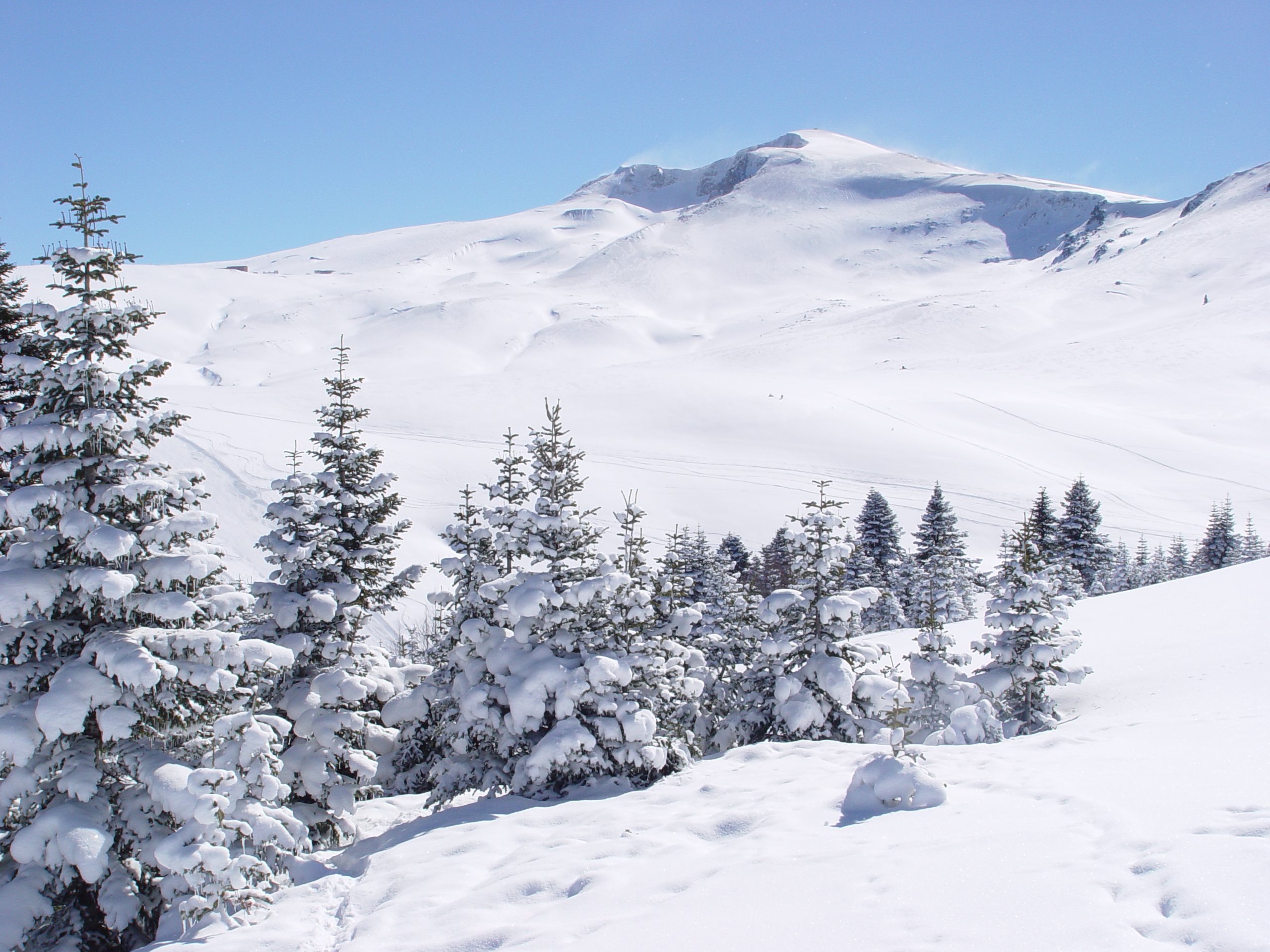
Uludağ is a popular destination for winter sports

=== Other destinations ===
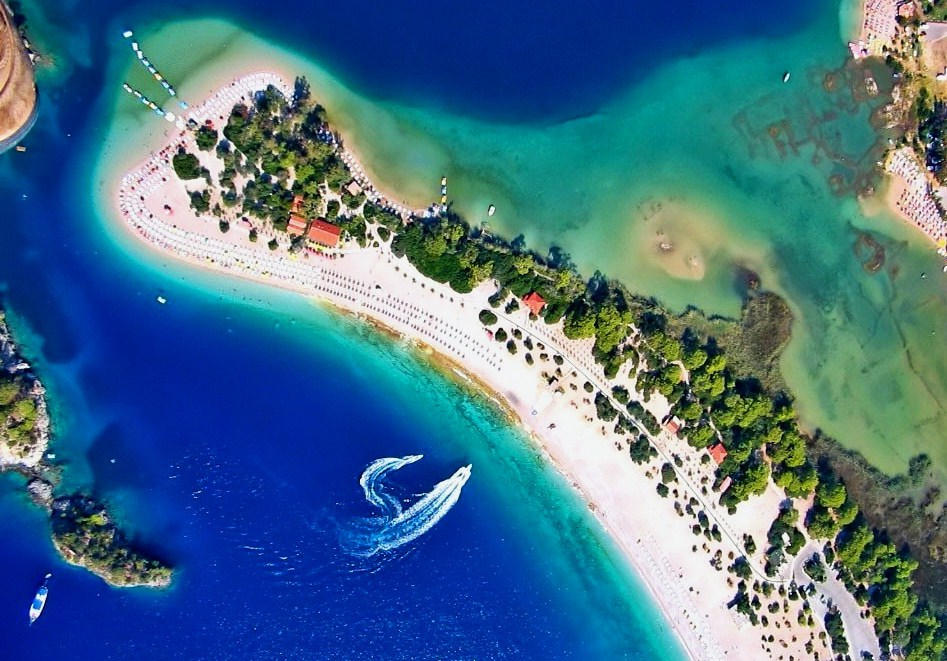
Ölüdeniz beach

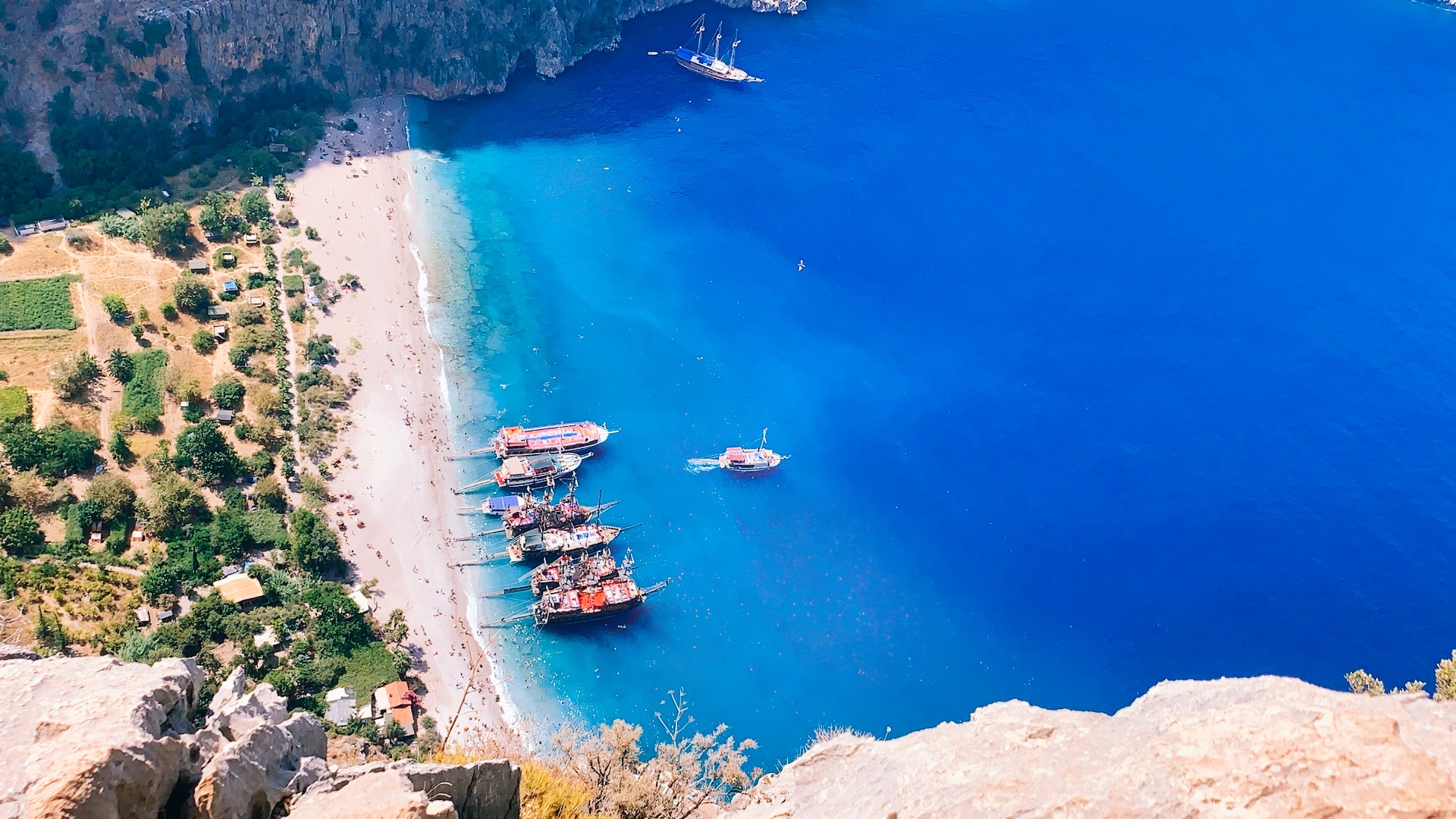
Butterfly Valley, Fethiye

Beach vacations and Blue Cruises, particularly for Turkish delights and visitors from Western Europe, are also central to the Turkish tourism industry. Most beach resorts are located along the southwestern and southern coast, called the Turkish Riviera, especially along the Mediterranean coast near Antalya. Antalya is also accepted as the tourism capital of Turkey. Major resort towns include Bodrum, Fethiye, Marmaris, Kuşadası, Didim and Alanya. Also, Turkey has been chosen second in the world in 2015 with its 436 blue-flagged beaches, according to the Chamber of Shipping.

Attractions elsewhere in the country include the sites of Ephesus, Troy, Pergamon, House of the Virgin Mary, Pamukkale, Hierapolis, Trabzon (where one of the oldest monasteries is the Sümela Monastery), Konya (where the poet Rumi had spent most of his life), Didyma, Church of Antioch, ancient Pontic capital and king rock tombs with its acropolis in Amasya, religious places in Mardin (such as Deyrülzafarân Monastery), and the ruined cities and landscapes of Cappadocia.

One of the most important and famous cities in the east and southeast of Turkey is called Diyarbakır. This city is considered one of the important options for traveling to the east of Turkey due to its numerous historical, religious and cultural places. For researchers who are interested in cultural studies, this city is a favorable option for study and research due to the accommodation of different ethnic groups (Kurds, Turks, Arabs, Assyrians, Armenians) and religious groups (Muslims, Christians). Due to the civil wars between the PKK group and the central government of Turkey in the 90's, the number of tourists in this region decreased. With the beginning of the 21st century and after the establishment of relative peace and security in these areas, tourism has been increasing again in these areas.

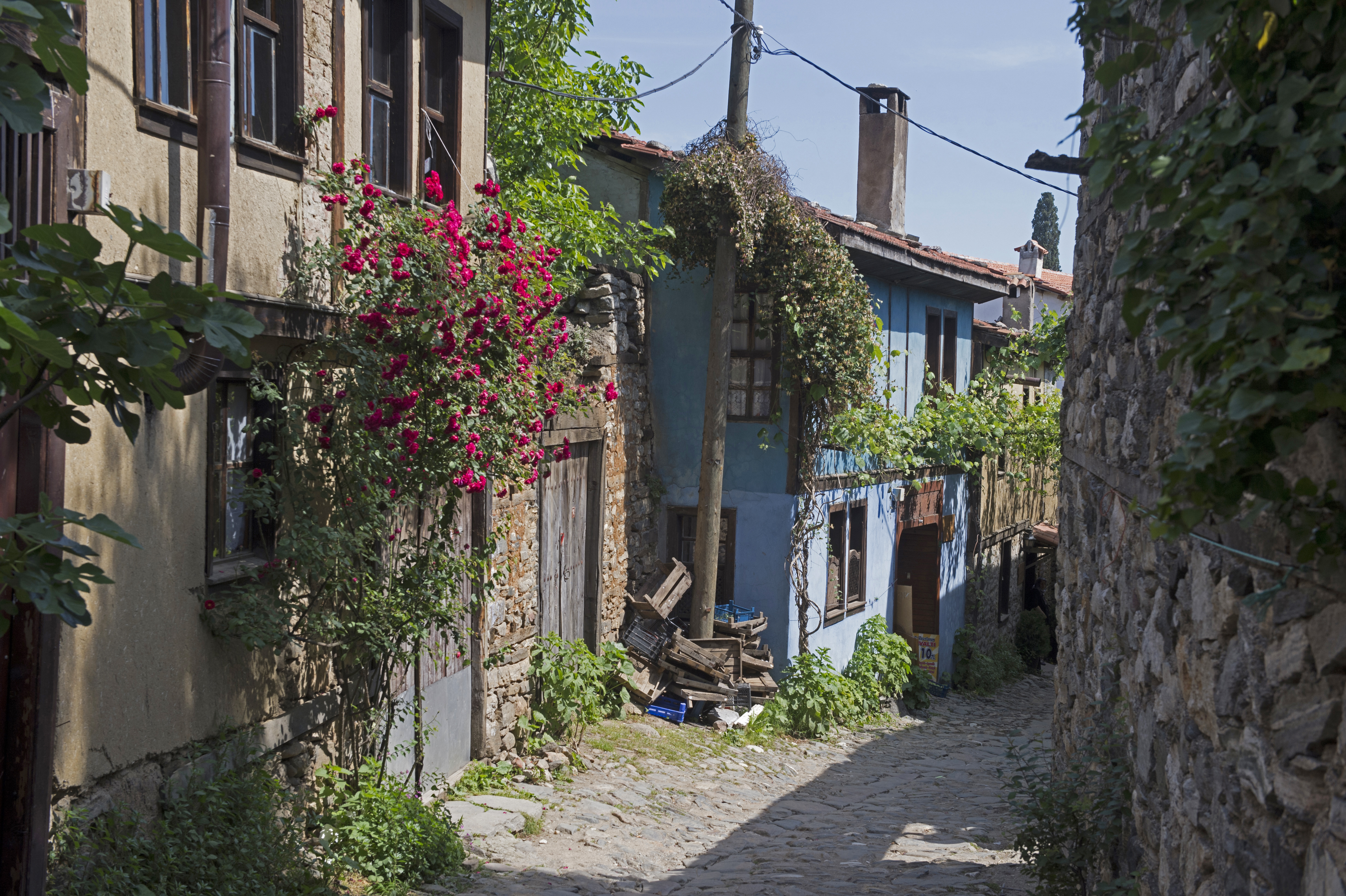
Cumalıkızık is an old town from early Ottoman era in Bursa

Gallipoli and Anzac Cove – a small cove on the Gallipoli peninsula, which became known as the site of World War I landing of the ANZAC (Australian and New Zealand Army Corps) on 25 April 1915. Following the landing at Anzac Cove, the beach became the main base for the Australian and New Zealand troops for the eight months of the Gallipoli campaign.

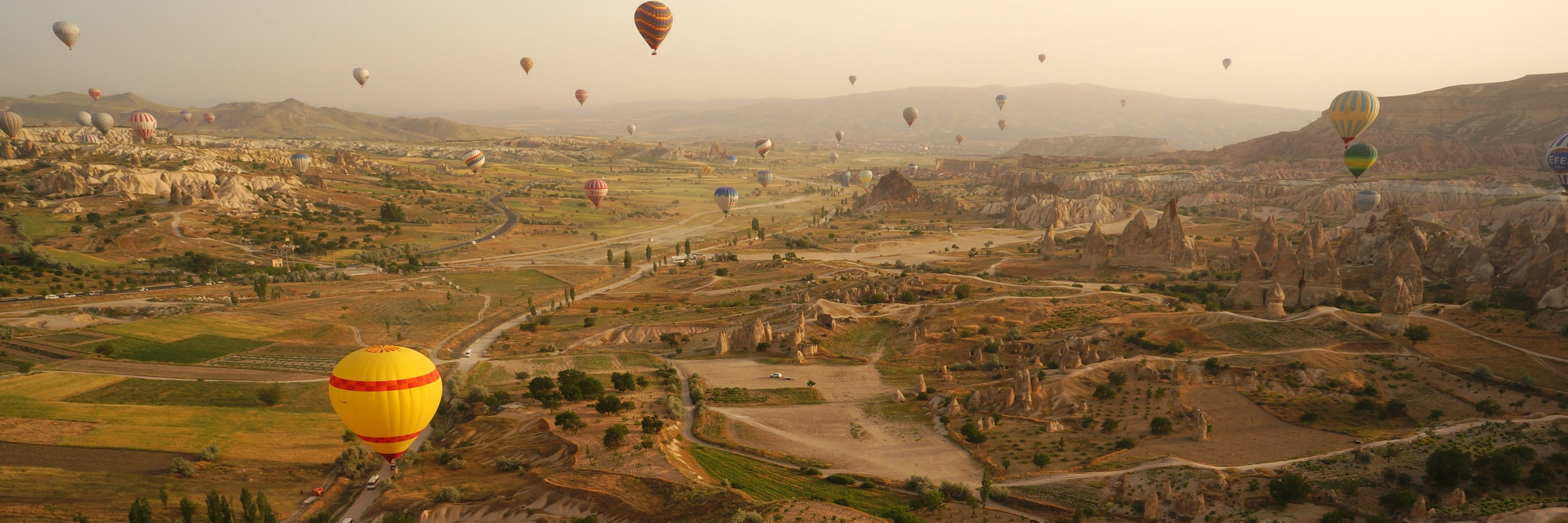
Cappadocia is a region created by the erosion of soft volcanic stone by the wind and rain for centuries. In the picture is the classic hot air ballon showing.The area is a popular tourist destination, having many sites with unique geological, historic, and cultural features.

== UNESCO World Heritage Sites ==
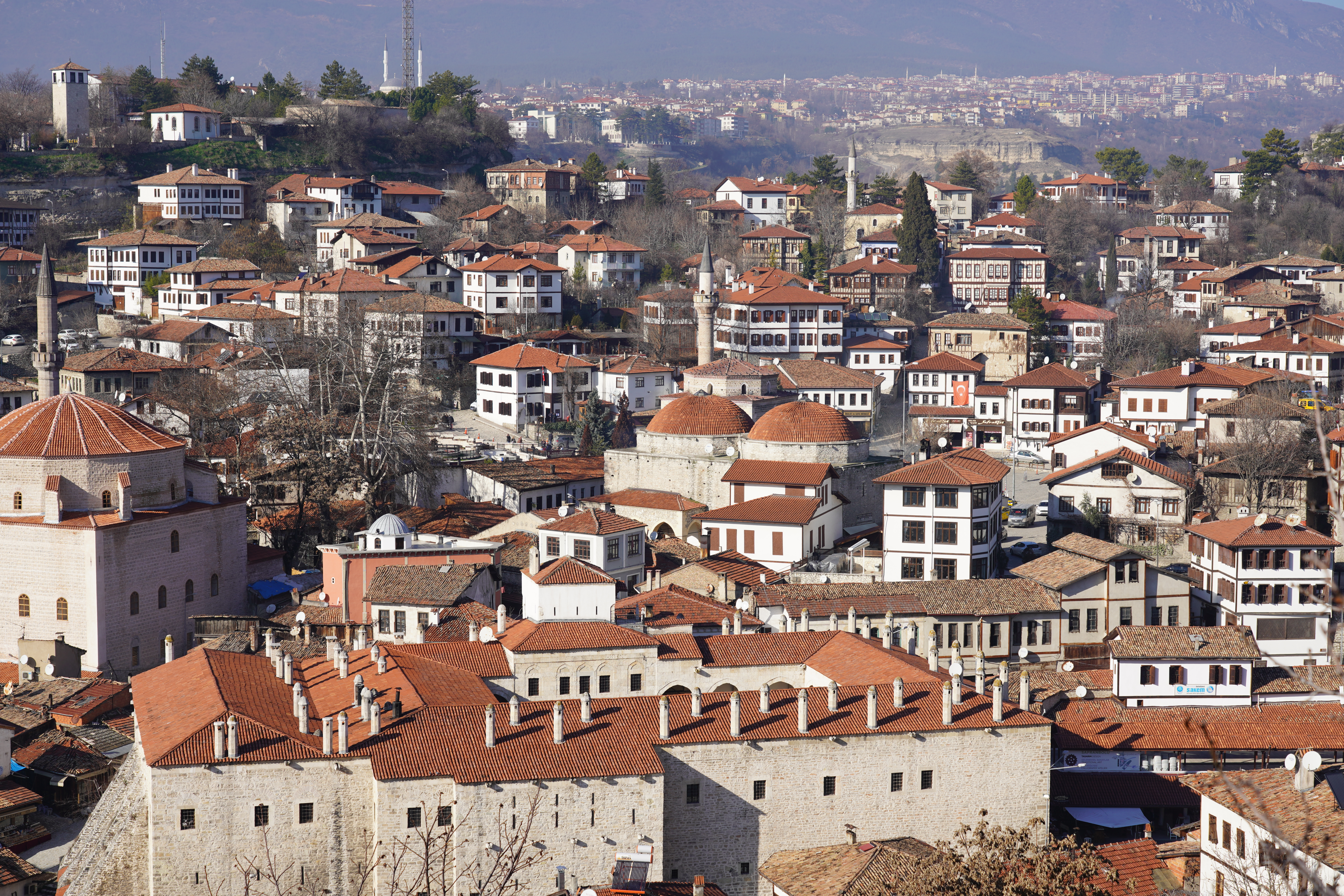
Safranbolu was added to the list of UNESCO World Heritage sites in 1994 due to its well-preserved Ottoman era houses and architecture.

As of 2023, Turkey hosts 21 UNESCO World Heritage Sites, 19 cultural and 2 mixed.

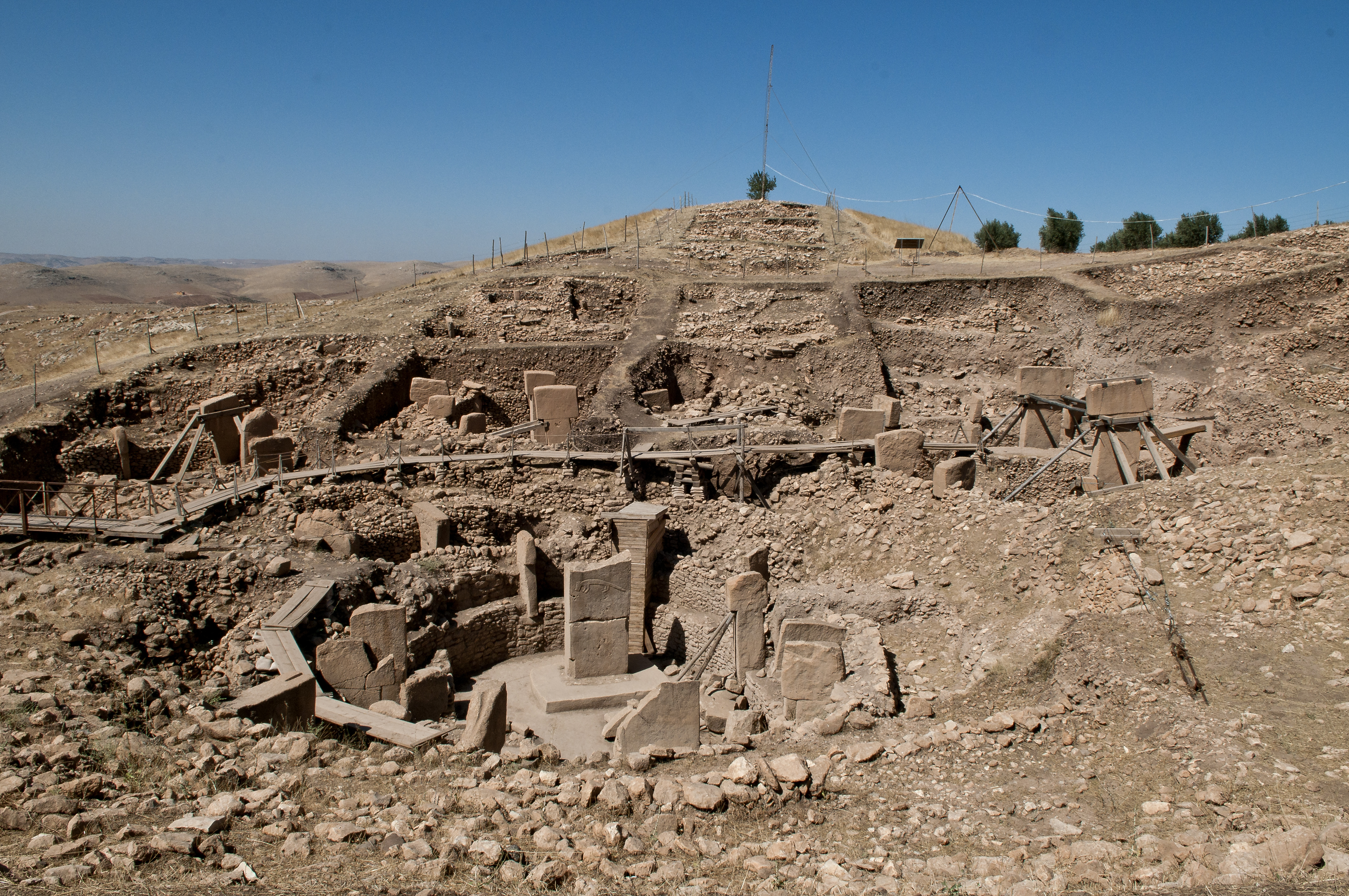
Göbeklitepe is a neolithic archaeological site from around 9500 BCE to at least 8000 BCE in Şanlıurfa

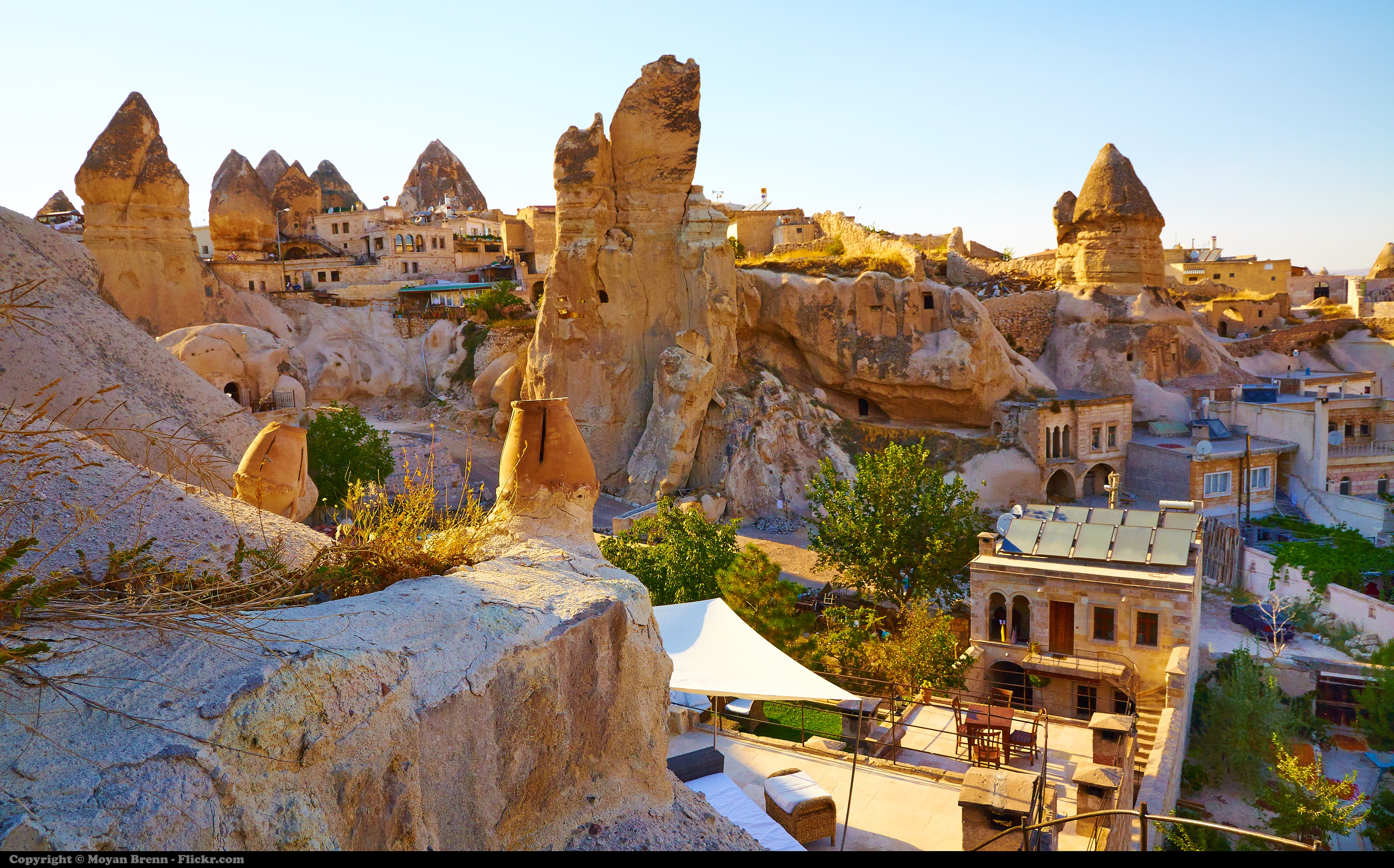
Göreme, Nevşehir

Turkey's World Heritage Sites, as per their official UNESCO names, are as follows:

1. Aphrodisias
2. Archaeological Site of Ani
3. Archaeological Site of Troy
4. Arslantepe Mound
5. Bursa and Cumalıkızık: the Birth of the Ottoman Empire
6. City of Safranbolu
7. Diyarbakır Fortress and Hevsel Gardens Cultural Landscape
8. Ephesus
9. Gordion
10. Göbekli Tepe
11. Göreme National Park and the Rock Sites of Cappadocia
12. Great Mosque and Hospital of Divriği
13. Hattusha: the Hittite Capital
14. Hierapolis-Pamukkale
15. Historic Areas of Istanbul
16. Nemrut Dağ
17. Neolithic Site of Çatalhöyük
18. Pergamon and its Multi-Layered Cultural Landscape
19. Selimiye Mosque and its Social Complex
20. Wooden Hypostyle Mosques of Medieval Anatolia
21. Xanthos-Letoon

== Medical tourism ==
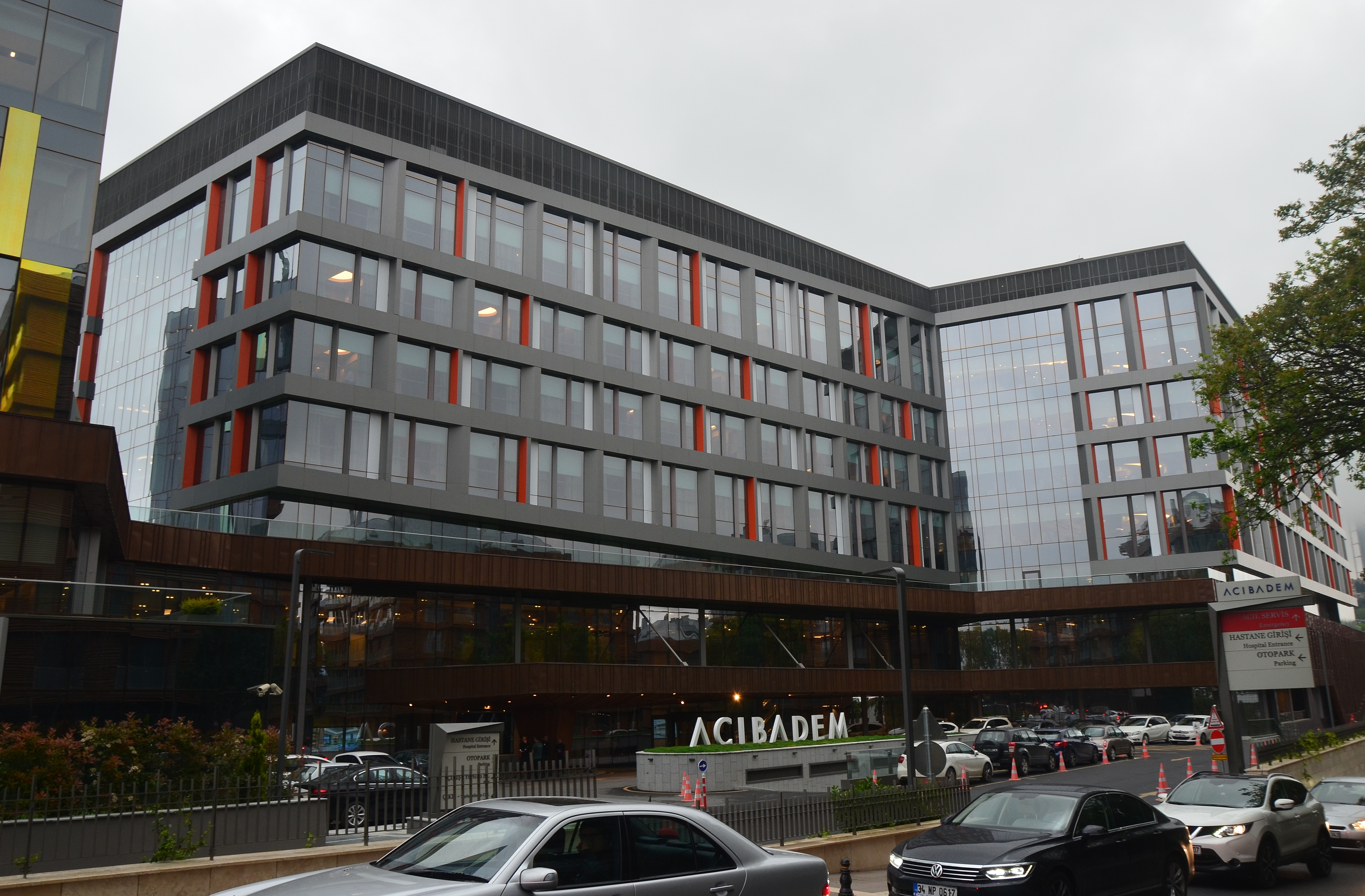
Acıbadem Hospital in Altunizade, Istanbul

An emerging branch of tourism in Turkey is medical tourism. Commonly performed medical procedures are hair transplant operations, rhinoplasty, cosmetic dentistry, bariatric surgery, buttock augmentation, mammaplasty and mastopexy as it draws in thousands of foreigner tourists every year. In 2021, the revenue generated from medical tourism was given as $1.05 billion with 642,000 people that visited for the purpose of getting medical service. This is due to Turkey offering high-quality clinics for affordable pricing compared to the rest of Europe and its central location between Asia and Europe. Other reasons for the high demand for healthcare in Turkey are foreigners having easy visa procedures and immediate scheduling for operations.

== Development of tourism ==
Turkey issued 16,199,968 electronic visas between April 2013 and 1 January 2017. The acceptance rate was 87.79% as 18,452,733 applications were filed in this period. Most visas were issued to nationals of the United Kingdom (4.6 million), Iraq (2 million) and the Netherlands (1.8 million).

Most visitors arriving in Turkey were from the following countries of nationality:

Country	2025	2024	2023	2022	2021	2020	2019	2018	2017	2016	2015	2014	2013	2012	2011	2010
Russia	6,903,981	6,710,198	6,313,675	5,232,611	4,694,422	2,128,758	7,017,657	5,964,613	4,715,438	866,256	3,649,003	4,479,049	4,269,306	3,599,925	3,468,214	3,107,043
Germany	6,745,190	6,620,612	6,193,259	5,679,194	3,085,215	1,118,932	5,027,472	4,512,360	3,584,653	3,890,074	5,580,792	5,250,036	5,041,323	5,028,745	4,826,315	4,385,263
United Kingdom	4,270,036	4,433,782	3,800,922	3,370,739	392,746	820,709	2,562,064	2,254,871	1,658,715	1,711,481	2,512,139	2,600,360	2,509,357	2,456,519	2,582,054	2,673,605
Iran	3,050,195	3,277,852	2,504,494	2,331,076	1,153,092	385,762	2,102,890	2,001,744	2,501,948	1,665,160	1,700,385	1,590,664	1,196,801	1,186,343	1,879,304	1,885,097
Bulgaria	2,808,357	2,918,581	2,893,092	2,882,512	1,402,795	1,242,961	2,713,464	2,386,885	1,852,867	1,690,766	1,821,480	1,693,591	1,582,912	1,492,073	1,491,561	1,433,970
Poland	1,914,958	1,866,986	1,539,123	1,135,903	585,076	145,908	880,839	646,365	296,120	205,701	500,779	510,569	423,129	428,440	486,319	428,275
United States	1,584,725	1,442,191	1,334,337	1,013,478	371,759	148,937	578,074	448,327	329,257	459,493	798,787	784,917	785,971	771,837	757,143	642,768
Georgia	1,327,884	1,466,188	1,633,977	1,514,813	291,852	410,501	1,995,254	2,069,392	2,438,730	2,206,266	1,911,832	1,755,289	1,769,447	1,404,882	1,152,661	1,112,193
Netherlands	1,275,577	1,303,262	1,232,220	1,244,756	645,601	271,526	1,117,290	1,013,642	799,006	906,336	1,232,487	1,303,730	1,312,466	1,273,593	1,222,823	1,073,064
Romania	1,174,607	1,173,358	990,005	886,555	496,178	269,076	763,320	641,484	423,868	357,473	441,097	426,585	395,214	385,055	390,248	355,144
France	1,100,603	1,088,380	1,031,824	986,090	621,493	311,708	875,957	731,379	578,524	555,151	847,259	1,037,152	1,046,010	1,032,565	1,140,459	928,376
Iraq	1,031,257	968,834	1,051,721	1,208,895	836,624	387,587	1,374,896	1,172,896	896,876	420,831	1,094,144	857,246	730,639	533,149	369,033	280,328
Ukraine	1,026,603	941,614	839,729	675,467	2,060,008	997,652	1,547,996	1,386,934	1,284,735	1,045,043	706,551	657,051	756,187	634,663	602,404	568,227
Azerbaijan	927,067	956,178	855,445	683,834	470,618	236,797	901,723	858,506	765,514	606,223	602,488	657,684	630,754	593,238	578,685	486,381
Saudi Arabia	921,726	869,453	820,683	497,914	10,083	67,490	564,816	747,233	651,170	530,410	450,674	341,786	234,220	175,467	116,711	84,934
Italy	810,998	719,668	602,176	420,661	116,806	72,619	377,011	284,195	205,788	213,227	507,897	697,360	731,784	714,041	752,238	671,060
Kazakhstan	762,747	863,542	826,319	712,136	366,076	137,213	455,724	426,916	402,830	240,188	423,744	437,971	425,773	380,046	315,907	247,784
Uzbekistan	649,719	569,818	470,644	419,673	272,604	102,598	252,138	241,235	195,745	134,330	143,331	143,354	129,292	105,976	85,011	68,124
Greece	621,595	707,133	686,480	569,795	157,723	136,305	836,882	686,891	623,705	593,150	755,414	830,841	703,168	669,823	702,017	670,297
Belgium	613,176	625,263	596,355	596,173	339,529	138,729	557,435	511,559	419,998	413,614	617,406	660,857	651,596	608,071	585,860	543,003
Austria	563,035	548,794	496,482	454,638	284,095	112,126	401,475	353,628	287,746	310,946	486,044	512,339	518,273	505,560	528,966	500,321
Spain	452,790	382,896	324,690	298,165	104,848	54,381	257,342	178,018	106,757	106,582	236,063	283,926	290,422	278,164	300,084	321,325
China	425,348	409,733	248,119	89,515	33,641	40,264	426,344	394,109	247,277	167,570	313,704	199,746	138,876	114,582	96,701	77,142
Switzerland	414,635	406,357	390,044	382,835	219,591	127,643	311,107	269,649	206,479	215,194	380,338	394,458	379,344	354,461	328,825	271,139
Sweden	406,422	397,201	364,984	415,696	192,872	93,703	444,285	384,397	289,134	320,580	624,649	667,551	692,186	617,811	571,917	447,270
Czech Republic	403,517	410,280	384,158	295,454	89,734	15,642	311,359	228,251	126,567	87,328	212,464	226,189	217,254	223,986	223,369	174,426
Algeria	343,592	324,042	292,505	210,478	48,827	50,121	295,512	288,207	213,333	176,233	171,873	160,052	118,189	104,489	84,844	67,954
Moldova	340,685	329,796	288,377	274,257	192,441	109,137	198,867	194,268	171,538	140,117	149,800	132,338	111,915	108,032	101,124	96,196
Denmark	336,097	345,198	319,835	356,127	111,499	44,694	335,877	326,278	269,026	329,618	408,841	408,287	402,818	391,312	369,867	314,446
Belarus	323,441	334,796	309,216	239,966	220,932	106,426	258,419	245,254	229,229	113,793	204,355	223,975	200,659	138,007	123,607	152,421
Canada	321,271	302,728	248,868	197,416	72,034	34,210	139,164	108,272	81,196	106,285	187,615	190,116	199,497	182,252	191,903	152,556
Serbia	318,512	342,002	311,738	357,787	238,852	129,284	282,347	225,312	146,852	110,594	178,997	189,396	169,988	157,568	137,934	113,465
Lithuania	306,952	285,026	277,810	251,619	114,227	14,194	229,704	199,371	134,264	109,749	112,654	106,469	90,180	69,520	76,036	71,992
Northern Cyprus	293,277	261,608	200,905	171,691	65,882	57,601	255,986	256,343	245,858	222,839	233,278	227,612	216,881	211,828	203,272	191,993
Jordan	281,071	301,641	384,680	494,629	326,633	93,750	474,874	406,469	277,729	203,179	162,866	131,329	102,871	102,154	94,914	96,562
Slovakia	267,778	274,047	235,303	196,462	37,963	8,648	207,108	157,003	97,967	61,477	151,514	136,899	127,455	126,974	122,088	91,765
Hungary	267,017	252,066	222,327	165,842	76,257	16,563	149,523	123,448	79,899	64,737	140,197	119,977	97,074	94,409	103,918	90,944
India	250,751	330,985	274,159	231,579	52,651	44,707	230,131	147,127	86,996	79,316	131,869	119,503	95,014	90,934	73,731	63,406
Lebanon	245,292	261,713	257,781	272,844	191,768	89,337	376,721	338,837	237,476	191,642	197,552	161,274	143,629	144,491	137,110	134,554
North Macedonia	242,520	246,626	251,066	266,184	182,045	115,483	222,862	209,519	172,851	146,008	167,428	156,138	140,793	137,579	130,648	115,541
Syria	232,859	257,324	384,958	370,877	404,064	211,914	571,976	477,439	404,203	291,754	847,275	1,176,490	1,252,826	730,039	974,054	899,494
Morocco	228,863	236,764	262,124	251,708	121,333	67,775	234,264	176,538	114,155	87,660	109,775	89,562	82,579	77,884	68,645	57,447
South Korea	226,434	206,931	159,039	99,869	15,206	36,636	212,970	159,354	120,622	106,904	228,694	248,910	187,040	159,084	149,943	123,315
Egypt	220,911	231,097	187,053	227,850	124,483	68,936	177,655	148,943	100,971	94,871	100,040	108,762	107,437	112,025	79,665	61,560
Ireland	220,021	195,899	163,165	136,608	36,947	26,176	96,886	71,221	50,102	54,221	101,379	105,001	112,665	110,863	118,620	111,065
Australia	219,696	205,874	192,770	118,847	15,674	15,109	120,837	96,488	77,153	97,626	225,762	200,730	190,457	164,899	156,009	131,685
Norway	211,552	222,994	203,325	191,789	54,633	25,100	208,330	161,789	116,180	156,215	282,210	326,292	412,870	406,879	375,502	299,405
Kuwait	209,921	264,440	363,070	480,123	246,249	120,221	374,191	298,620	255,644	179,938	174,486	133,128	88,238	65,167	41,617	27,281
Kosovo	209,671	209,853	174,681	193,823	145,931	70,462	152,048	139,500	116,049	100,022	97,818	86,272	78,825	70,156	56,411	46,228
Indonesia	207,080	202,456	178,800	152,995	49,319	39,690	127,149	119,337	85,031	47,232	56,867	59,486	57,385	56,113	40,282	24,349
Turkmenistan	199,988	153,688	120,928	45,249	18,979	43,236	297,706	252,911	230,881	165,762	174,330	180,395	148,709	135,168	137,476	114,390
Kyrgyzstan	199,280	184,174	169,906	147,487	102,840	52,142	121,364	114,926	104,911	88,877	88,369	81,941	64,905	42,866	41,197	35,665
Libya	192,126	220,497	194,351	220,179	197,983	107,251	259,243	188,312	99,395	72,014	234,762	267,501	264,266	213,890	53,562	60,917
Bosnia and Herzegovina	187,015	197,388	177,893	200,698	131,347	61,651	144,445	120,480	90,378	66,177	85,434	83,258	72,086	61,851	56,522	47,361
Japan	161,103	134,697	78,782	30,610	7,153	19,122	103,320	81,931	49,323	44,695	104,847	170,550	174,150	203,592	188,312	195,404
Tunisia	160,583	182,053	176,547	206,714	126,970	57,563	172,587	142,372	111,627	100,185	102,341	100,612	91,683	86,595	63,176	57,855
Albania	159,240	159,828	142,482	145,032	89,748	49,667	134,869	125,935	103,593	83,029	80,032	76,273	65,113	59,565	53,141	49,954
Pakistan	145,935	135,653	140,388	173,621	90,681	51,326	130,736	113,579	77,464	52,023	59,700	48,420	34,170	28,394	26,735	22,540
Mexico	139,411	142,963	155,155	114,267	34,705	12,775	66,557	36,737	19,632	20,958	45,902	42,663	36,617	31,576	29,606	22,908
Latvia	136,128	124,732	117,936	97,240	44,760	9,392	86,051	65,868	46,536	34,861	60,485	58,981	55,058	45,725	45,074	39,102
Philippines	127,064	129,071	120,347	97,954	55,397	48,440	139,126	95,068	63,244	59,015	83,515	69,229	59,734	65,272	51,610	31,658
Finland	125,834	123,414	117,123	117,281	32,809	15,003	135,192	128,860	97,112	122,185	213,803	228,138	219,044	195,083	186,562	143,204
Portugal	122,992	112,371	92,901	74,812	26,379	12,893	54,130	39,948	26,727	27,015	56,312	52,851	45,928	46,606	52,319	53,373
Israel	120,960	85,949	765,776	843,028	225,238	129,677	569,368	443,732	380,415	293,988	224,568	188,608	164,917	83,740	79,140	109,559
Brazil	119,501	120,201	106,717	84,582	17,788	22,722	101,164	78,691	49,754	42,530	85,473	91,627	113,433	88,903	89,442	65,246
Estonia	114,600	103,956	96,227	93,209	47,597	5,113	77,041	61,707	48,024	35,549	63,363	55,649	48,537	35,459	34,921	35,136
Malaysia	109,379	93,132	95,444	89,766	9,618	17,892	114,214	95,591	61,166	49,255	69,616	69,968	55,139	41,169	36,222	32,458
United Arab Emirates	101,460	99,992	120,819	146,438	52,587	3,772	37,500	43,292	49,360	38,315	51,600	53,736	52,424	48,071	35,579	30,480
Colombia	89,098	72,376	69,257	77,863	30,094	10,601	70,974	56,031	29,650	19,416	26,046	23,378	21,979	12,987	9,853	7,129
Taiwan	84,403	75,833	49,890	11,341	2,290	13,118	107,592	98,097	61,318	46,035	40,029	38,509	31,019	21,569	19,636	17,820
Croatia	78,844	77,003	66,948	61,327	29,464	16,566	56,465	44,188	23,630	21,346	38,598	45,297	44,058	47,144	41,959	33,563
Oman	76,051	86,661	95,895	130,160	61,058	14,294	88,378	53,230	25,234	13,891	18,787	14,283	8,956	7,959	5,998	5,408
Argentina	73,456	56,784	48,383	41,708	6,992	7,228	64,483	68,668	48,280	62,394	82,977	44,407	46,729	28,559	27,136	22,255
South Africa	70,698	70,231	67,647	71,636	6,088	12,251	74,652	53,544	34,487	29,316	47,679	43,049	44,798	40,771	34,394	27,177
Afghanistan	62,840	61,425	63,708	57,241	56,300	30,020	68,681	56,543	48,668	50,197	31,983	22,599	19,704	15,373	16,395	12,511
Slovenia	57,047	58,884	53,600	48,622	18,580	8,108	50,414	40,716	25,105	18,863	39,734	41,799	37,692	39,899	41,870	38,597
Bahrain	53,445	64,472	64,771	98,147	62,730	17,852	90,299	77,075	59,442	41,505	32,476	24,305	16,230	13,342	9,712	9,375
Qatar	50,794	57,813	70,090	92,439	83,831	31,956	108,496	96,327	48,764	32,681	35,832	29,743	18,630	13,971	7,661	6,043
Thailand	50,708	47,362	39,051	29,814	6,687	8,163	62,192	54,098	30,721	12,483	22,125	26,219	20,783	12,211	11,067	9,282
State of Palestine	49,751	49,015	73,430	97,011	64,073	17,181	72,760	56,816	32,339	19,353	16,218	11,435	7,971	6,327	5,447	4,685
Stateless (Haymatlos)	47,755	52,572	68,908	89,322	62,423	29,681	96,424	77,689	54,296	38,447	54,434	45,466	35,501	31,736	26,495	22,897
New Zealand	40,641	35,631	31,007	15,448	2,746	2,879	20,912	16,174	11,362	15,287	36,915	32,933	30,667	28,278	26,709	24,636
Singapore	40,197	39,134	38,932	30,602	2,951	4,912	34,930	28,382	17,561	15,962	26,892	29,449	22,403	22,206	20,957	18,994
Chile	33,581	24,746	25,713	17,333	3,815	3,320	18,509	14,609	8,645	10,421	24,307	17,451	15,905	12,765	11,964	8,183
Mongolia	32,611	36,148	36,162	43,764	12,883	6,314	17,910	15,876	13,174	10,929	11,231	10,723	10,179	8,154	5,357	4,776
Montenegro	32,248	34,274	29,844	29,417	20,812	11,441	27,639	24,183	19,555	16,709	19,768	20,423	18,838	16,559	13,793	11,610
Yemen	30,203	32,017	35,911	34,599	21,856	13,354	41,673	39,545	28,491	25,325	24,237	26,033	17,354	11,826	8,066	6,344
Armenia	29,879	31,587	31,950	36,445	10,178	9,309	66,882	51,880	48,320	39,063	48,522	67,198	73,365	70,956	72,393	69,323
Bangladesh	29,558	27,519	23,651	24,335	8,226	5,634	20,605	17,932	11,346	8,951	12,212	12,706	8,856	6,652	6,168	2,190
Venezuela	29,436	27,451	22,753	18,395	11,446	3,473	11,738	9,246	6,956	5,035	6,435	6,975	11,271	9,600	8,557	6,769
Peru	29,122	25,207	19,620	13,487	3,642	1,889	11,430	8,674	5,085	4,667	7,281	5,733	4,393	2,952	2,697	2,016
Hong Kong	26,436	23,849	17,642	5,435	1,043	4,053	30,092	18,683	6,994	6,399	19,074	20,217	12,650	13,138	10,666	6,442
Tajikistan	22,560	32,785	78,185	74,101	41,440	16,972	44,155	40,879	30,532	24,768	31,917	34,678	27,174	22,823	16,822	17,737
Nigeria	22,488	26,937	26,125	38,566	26,508	17,493	39,885	28,510	25,760	25,264	27,711	28,387	22,869	19,897	14,564	9,172
Ethiopia	20,723	23,267	26,382	25,619	45,230	14,356	20,714	9,137	6,078	5,408	5,095	4,480	3,488	2,826	1,912	1,479
Luxembourg	19,309	17,228	15,633	13,186	8,499	2,228	10,957	7,716	4,922	4,831	12,764	15,310	15,733	14,034	13,286	11,262
Ecuador	17,215	15,418	15,770	15,807	4,833	1,558	8,416	8,423	5,548	4,323	6,791	5,093	4,780	4,433	3,892	2,704
Malta	16,096	15,239	14,356	16,321	7,163	3,258	8,739	8,287	5,523	5,849	9,210	7,430	6,769	6,397	5,974	3,361
Sudan	15,416	15,093	19,913	43,192	25,965	10,555	17,863	15,661	12,162	10,562	11,434	10,714	9,319	8,161	7,458	6,634
Cyprus	15,271	16,762	14,232	11,254	2,471	2,207	12,355	10,516	10,201	10,342	12,967	15,943	14,265	18,924	16,749	15,421
Mauritius	14,099	13,258	11,859	13,836	2,831	2,306	10,714	6,137	5,485	2,499	4,078	4,046	2,648	4,088	3,255	2,117
Vietnam	13,965	10,711	7,474	6,247	1,811	1,819	13,194	9,622	4,947	3,293	6,399	5,679	4,618	3,674	5,266	3,428
Sri Lanka	12,995	11,483	9,182	6,630	2,149	1,602	7,530	5,100	3,219	2,405	3,519	3,141	3,268	2,431	1,769	1,408
Nepal	12,847	10,051	6,663	5,382	2,310	2,446	8,271	7,788	5,904	3,425	3,795	1,880	1,155	1,277	915	634
Senegal	12,335	13,751	14,390	16,282	12,641	5,376	10,290	7,546	6,170	5,705	5,483	5,133	4,811	5,650	5,579	4,755
Eritrea	10,944	10,783	11,607	11,032	5,409	2,225	10,004	6,741	2,982	1,447	1,608	1,237	584	546	382	561
Total	52,775,055	52,629,283	49,209,180	44,564,395	24,712,266	12,734,213	45,058,286	39,488,401	32,410,034	25,352,213	36,244,632	36,837,900	34,910,098	31,782,832	31,456,076	28,632,204

=== Explain ===
Foreign tourist arrivals increased substantially in Turkey between 2000 and 2005, from 8 million to 25 million, which made Turkey a top-10 destination in the world for foreign visitors. 2005 revenues were US$20.3 billion which also made Turkey one of the top-10 biggest revenue owners in the world. In 2011, Turkey ranked as the 6th most popular tourist destination in the world and 4th in Europe, according to UNWTO World Tourism barometer. See World Tourism rankings. At its height in 2014, Turkey attracted around 42 million foreign tourists, still ranking as the 6th most popular tourist destination in the world. From 2015, tourism to Turkey entered a steep decline. In 2016, only around 30 million people visited Turkey. 2016 is described as the second year of huge losses on both visitor numbers and income, a "year of devastating losses", with Turkish tourism businesses stating that they "cannot remember a worse time in the sector". The number of foreign visitors started recovering in 2017 with 37.9 million visitors being recorded. The recovery was partly due to intense security campaigns and advertising. The number of Russian tourists increased by 444% after the recovery of bilateral relations, resulting in Russia becoming the top tourism market for Turkey once again. Increases were also recorded in the British, Dutch and Belgian markets.

In early 2017, the Turkish government urged Turkish citizens living abroad to take their vacations in Turkey, attempting to revive the struggling tourism sector of an economy that went into contraction from late 2016. After the April 2017 constitutional referendum, another sharp drop in tourist bookings from Germany was recorded. In 2018, however, the German Tourism Industry Association recorded a growth in German tourist bookings for Turkey, with a 70% increase being recorded by the TUI Group alone.

== Gallery ==
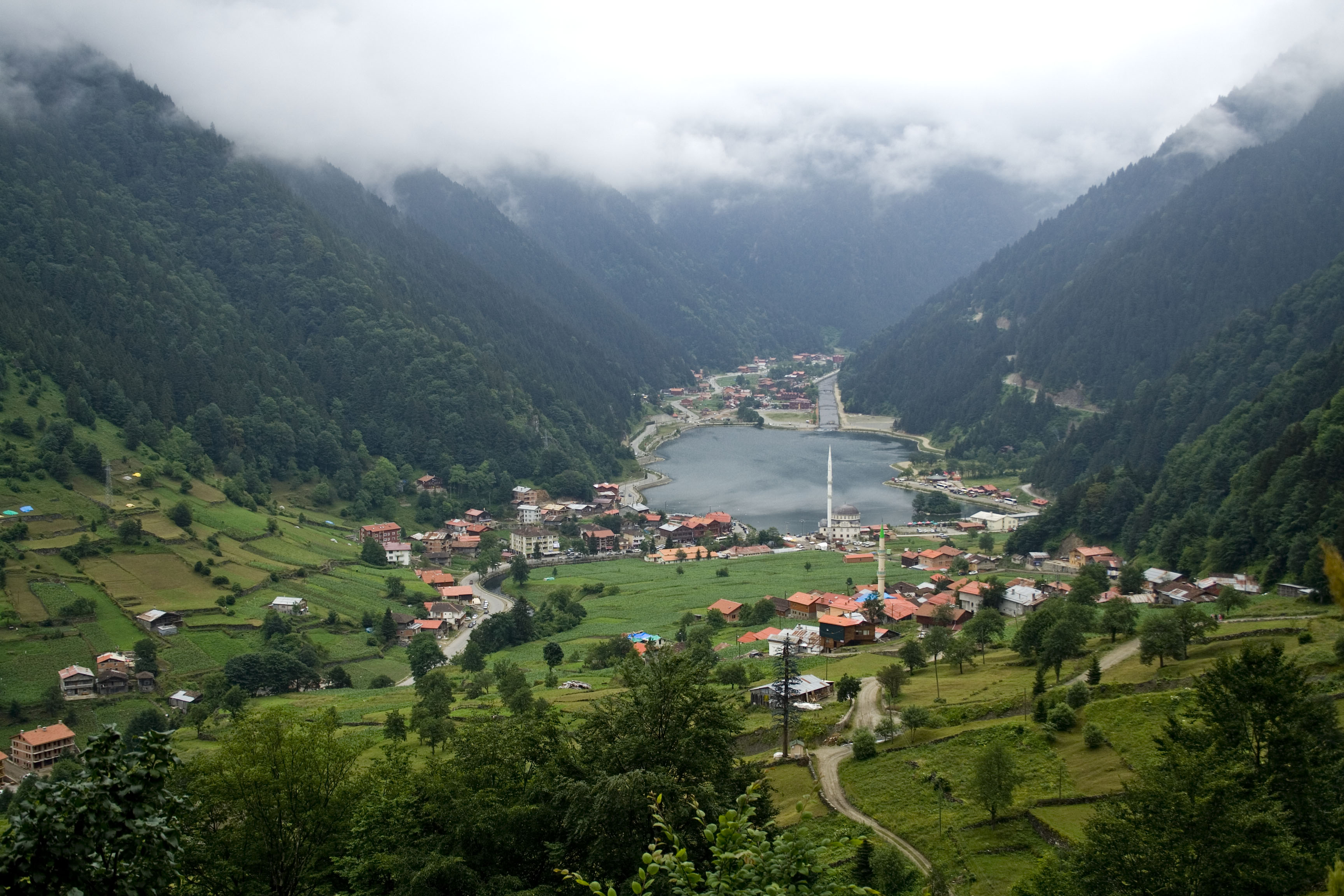
Uzungöl lake and town in Black Sea region

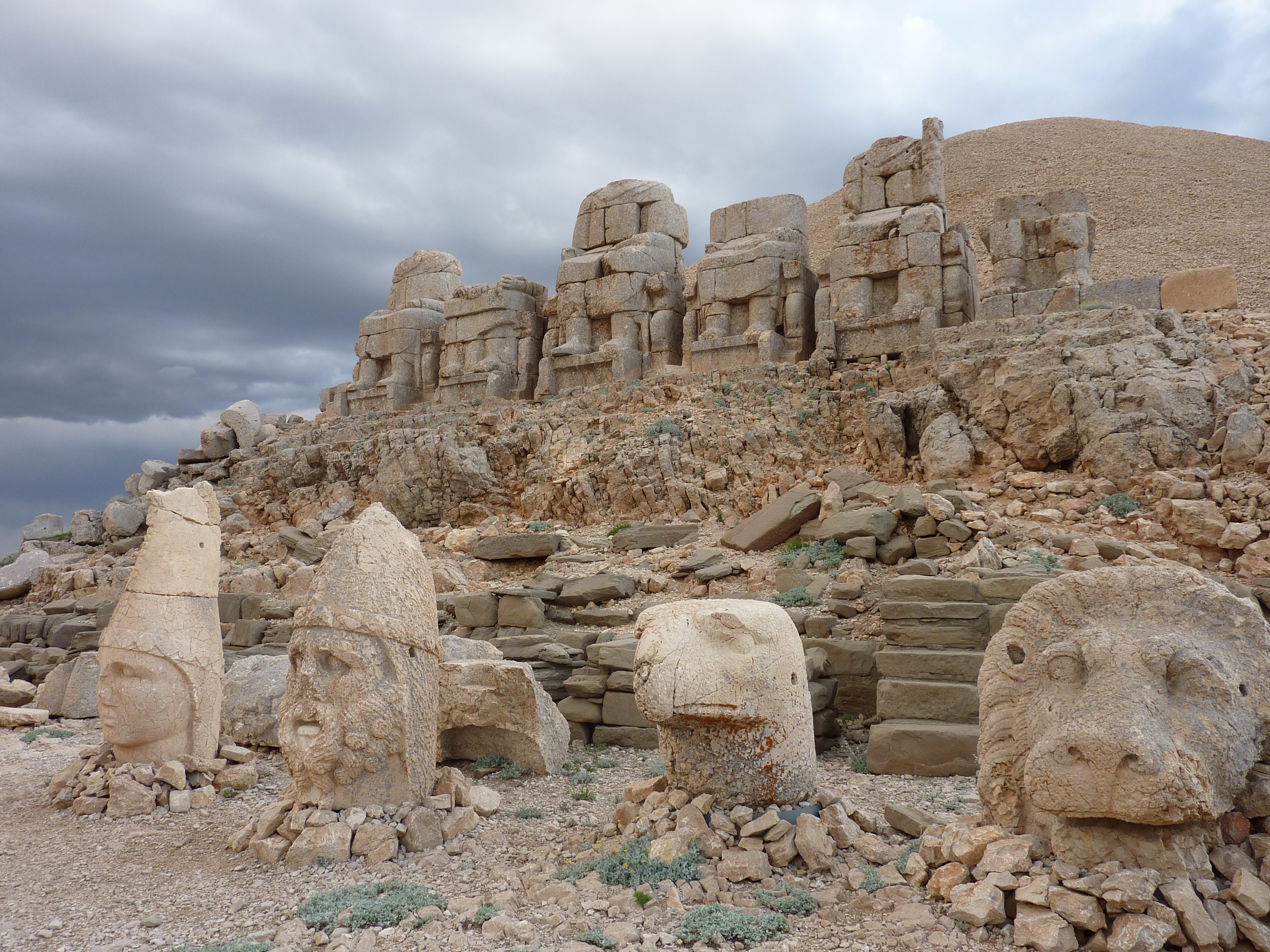
Statues of Mount Nemrut in Eastern Turkey

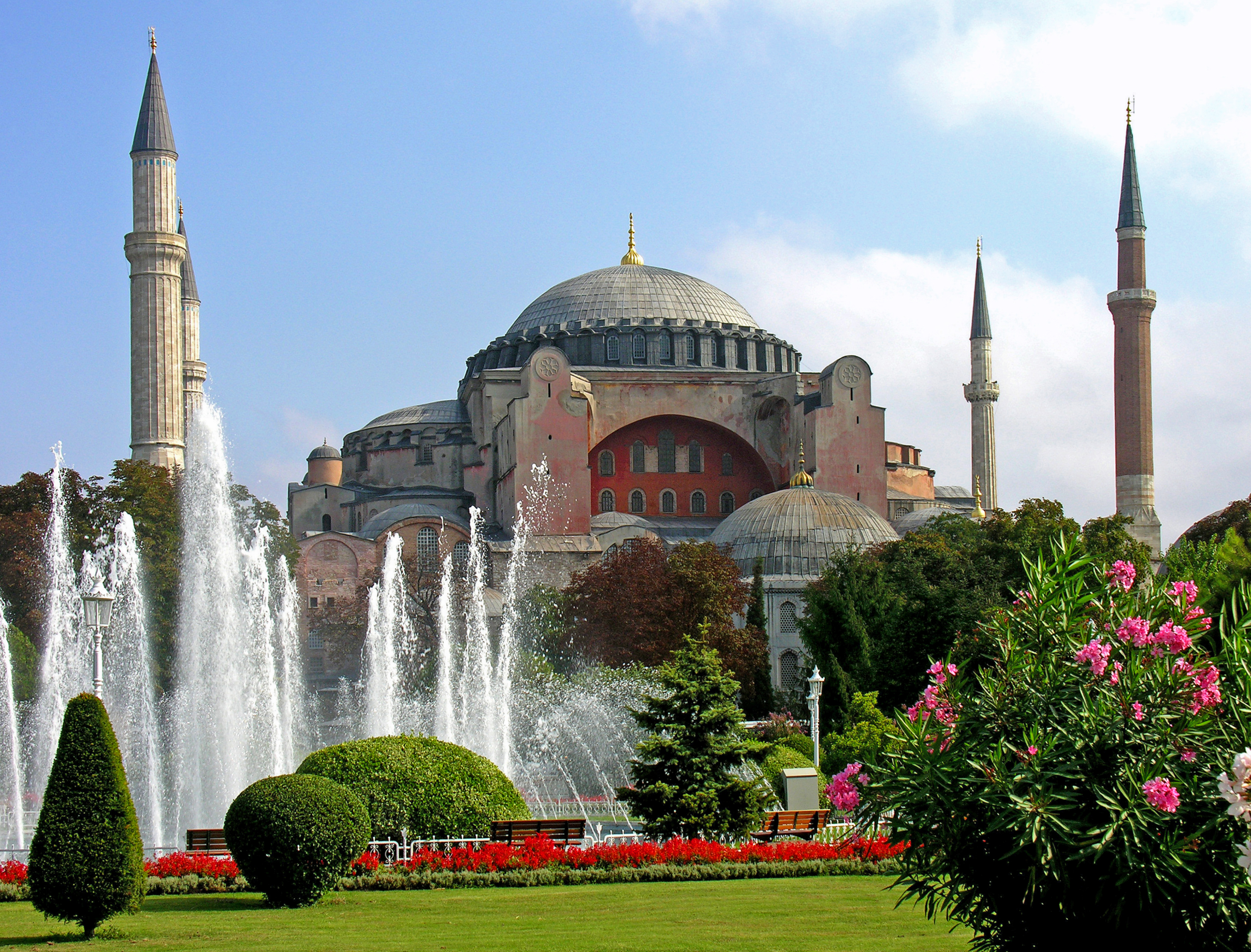
Hagia Sophia in Istanbul attracts around 3 million tourists each year.

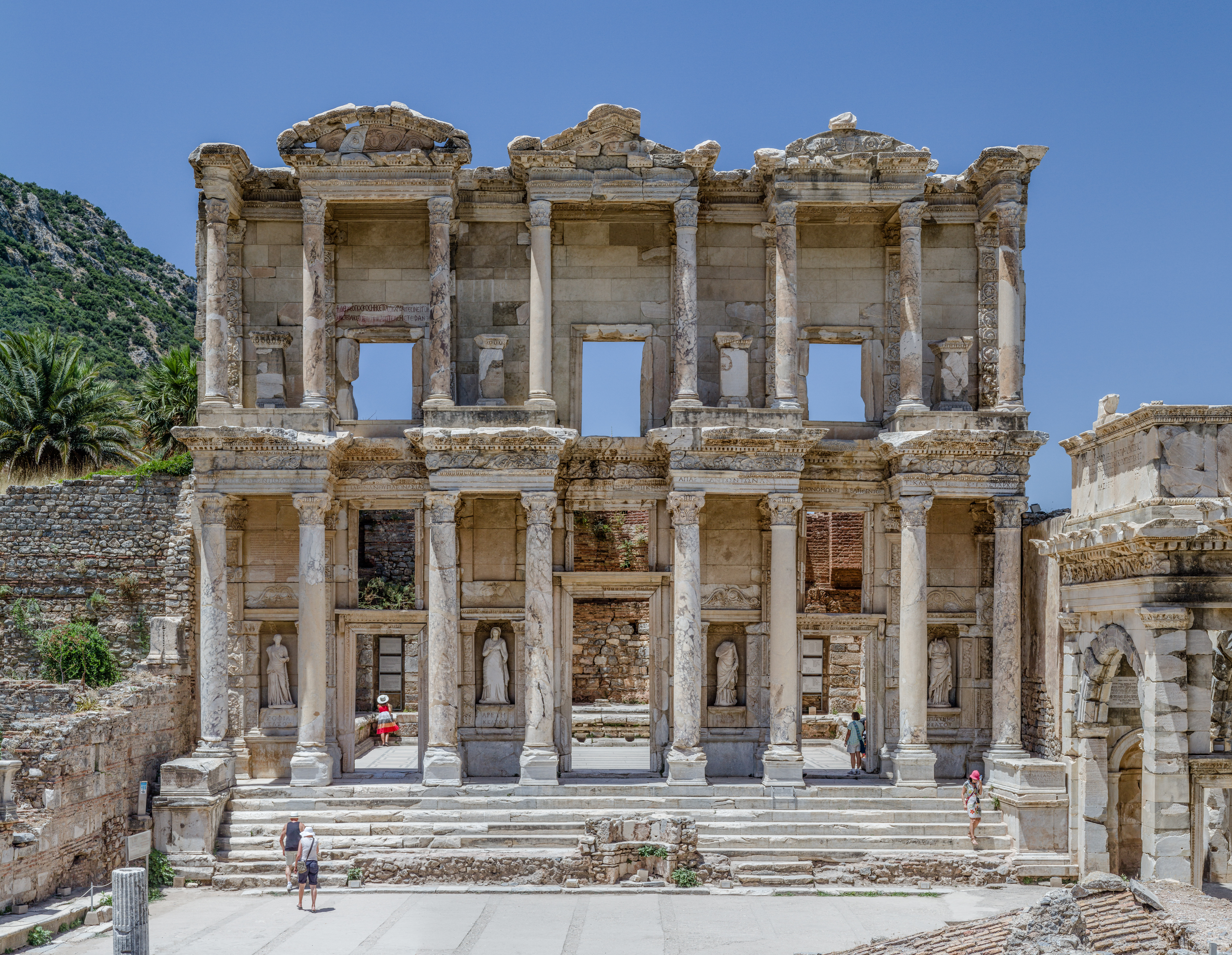
Library of Celsus in Ephesus

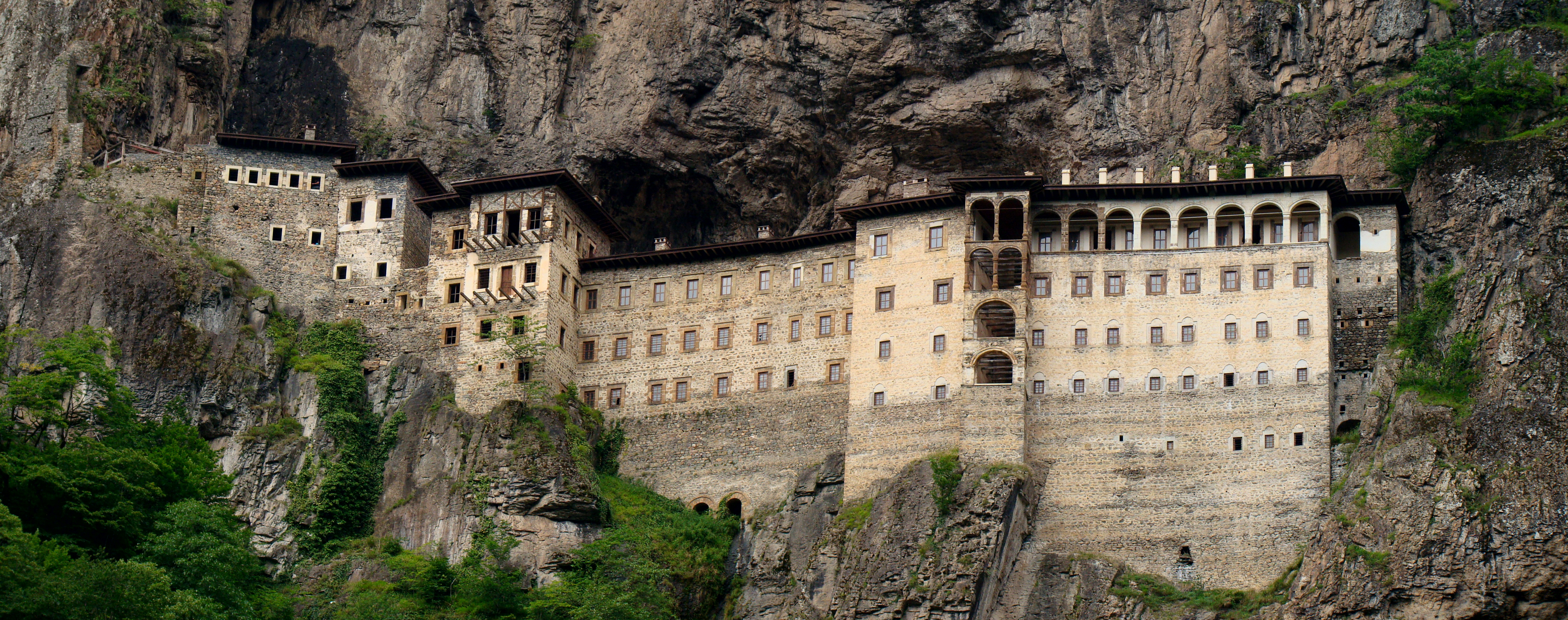
Sumela Monastery in Trabzon

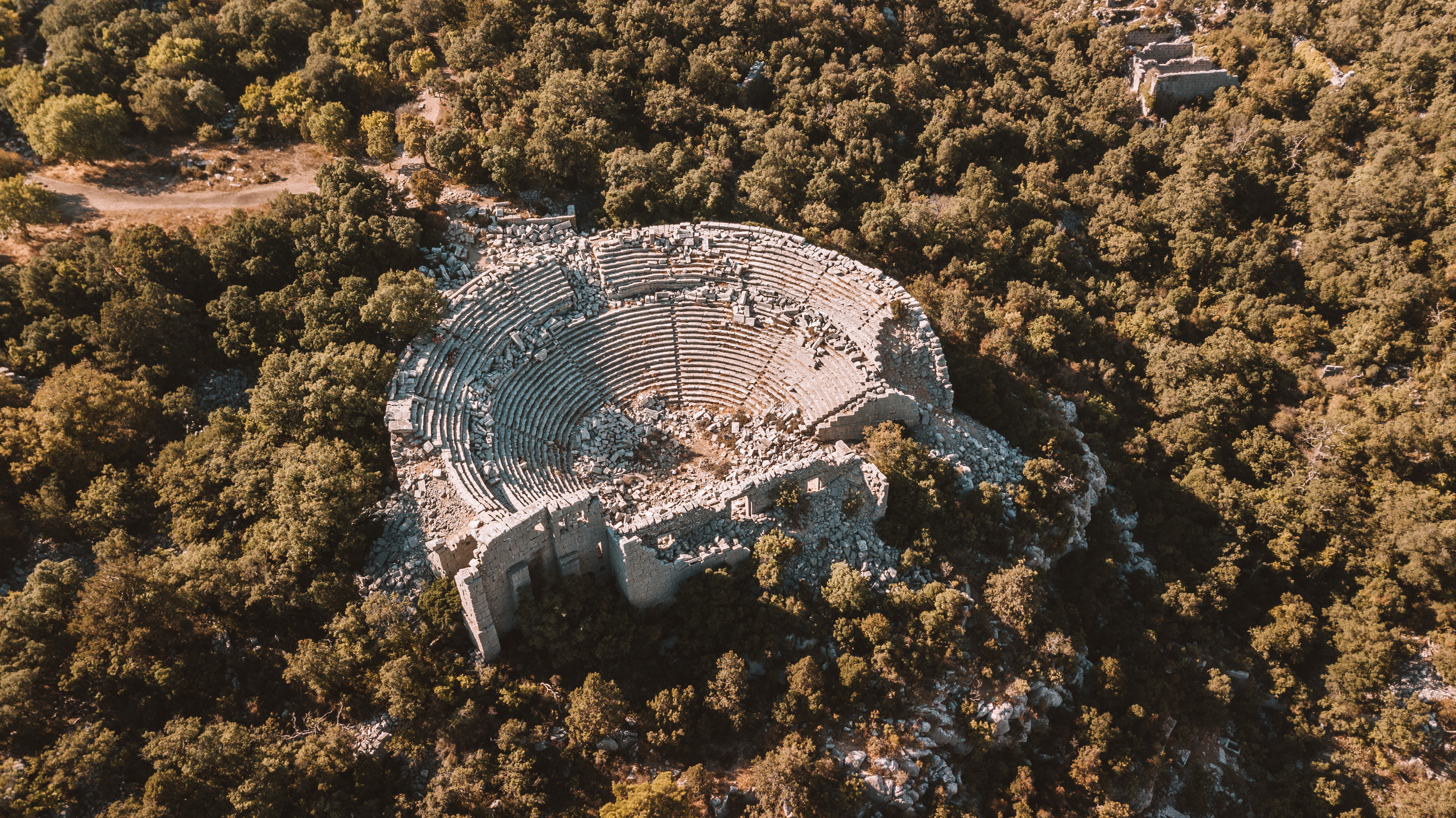
Mount Güllük-Termessos National Park in Antalya

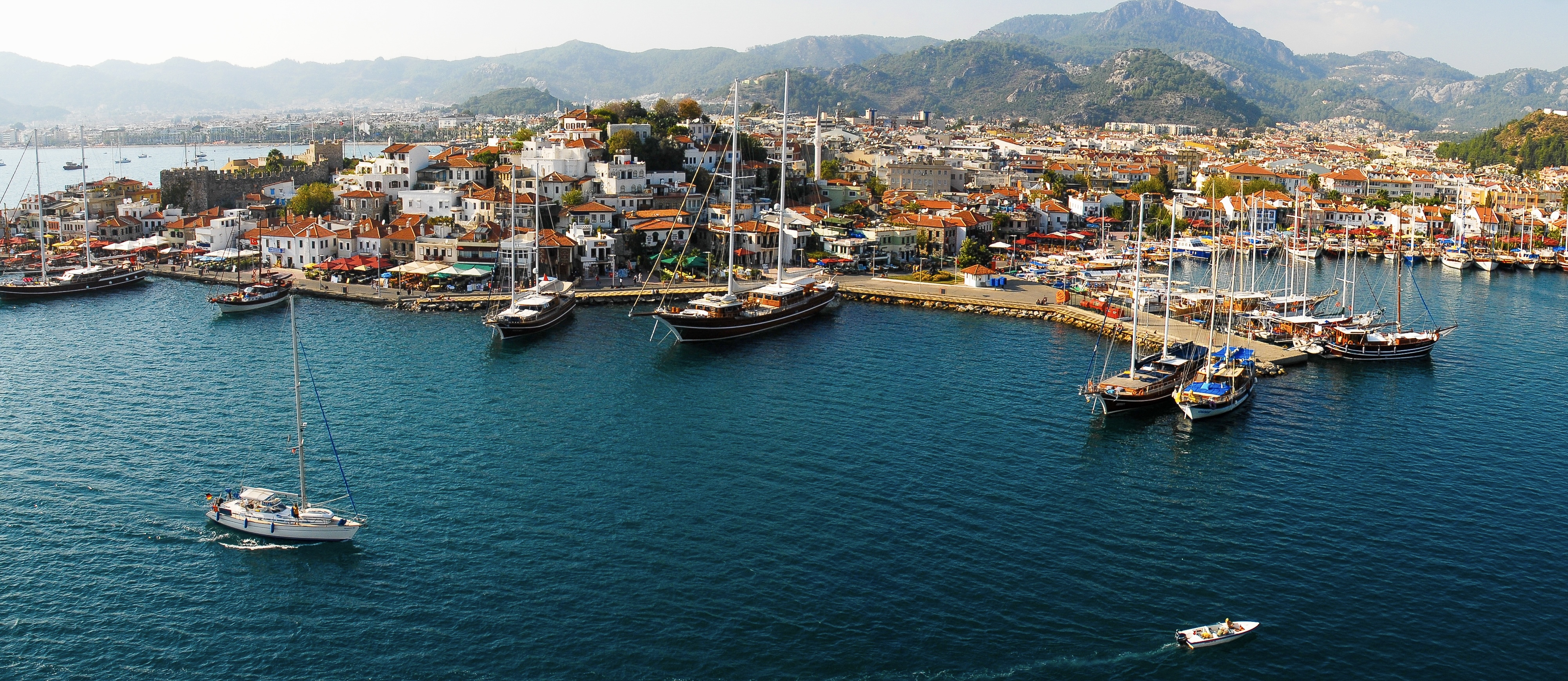
Marmaris in Turkey is a popular summer tourism destination.

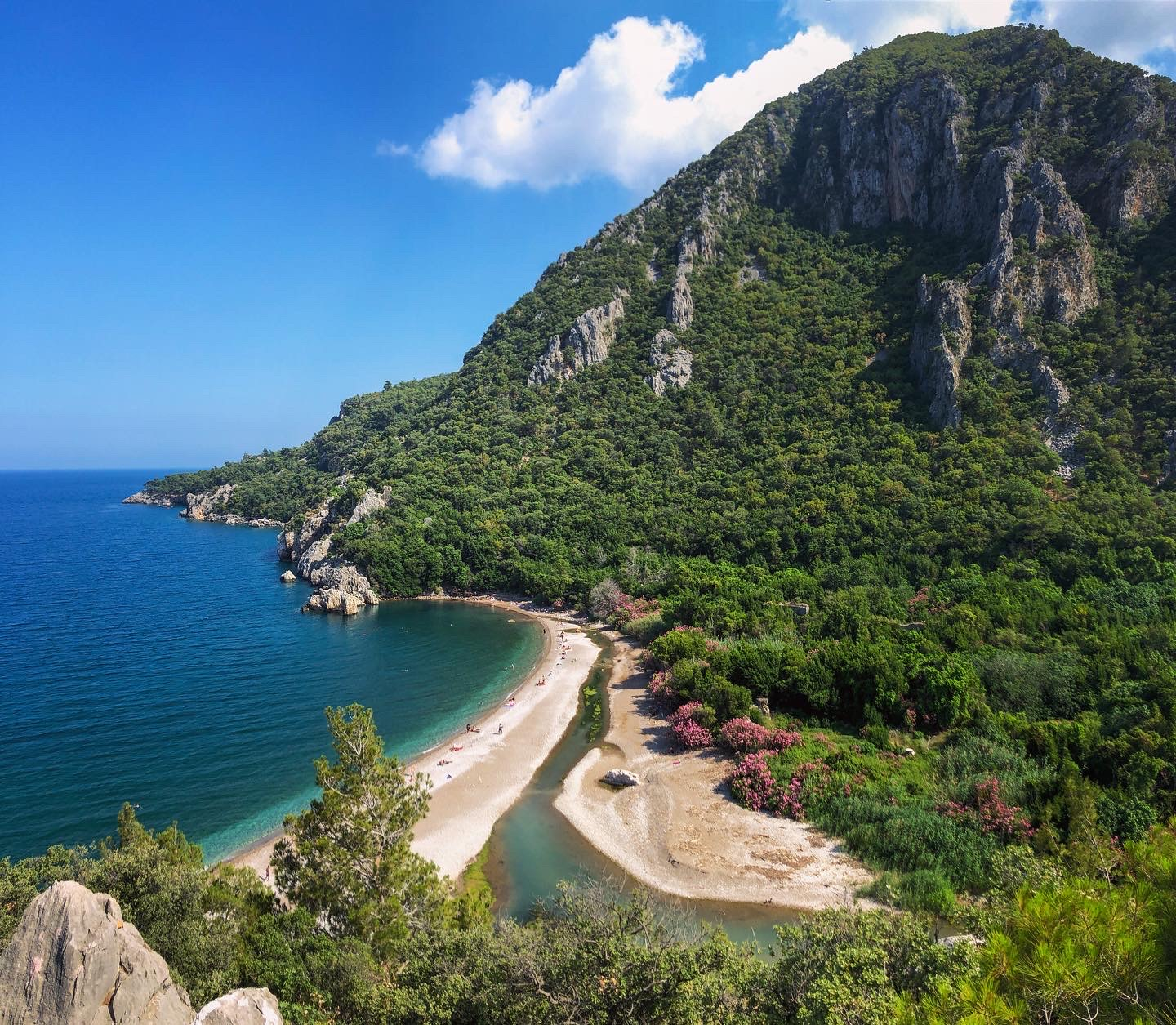
Beydağları Coastal National Park in Antalya, Turkey

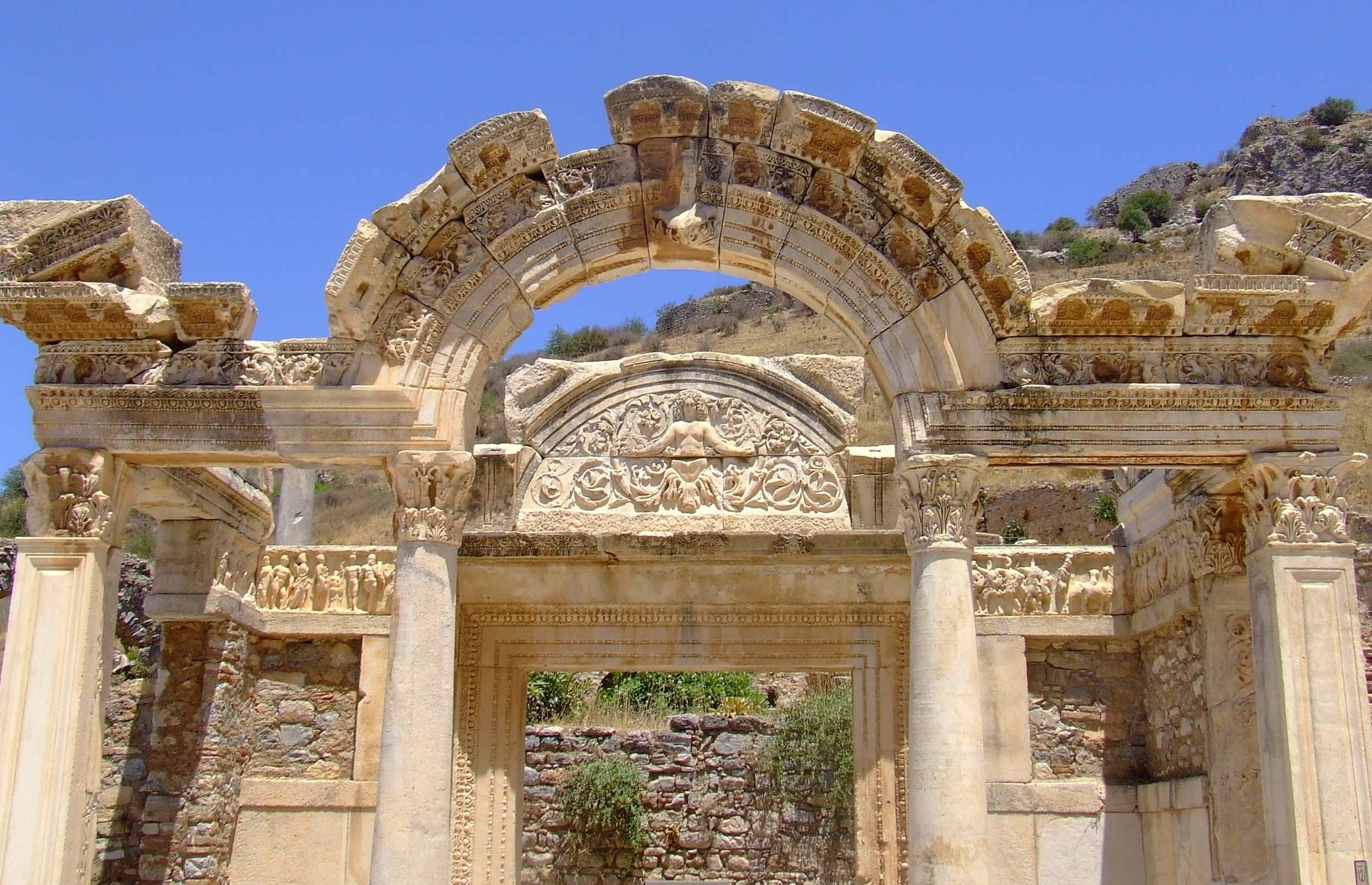
Temple of Hadrian in Ephesus

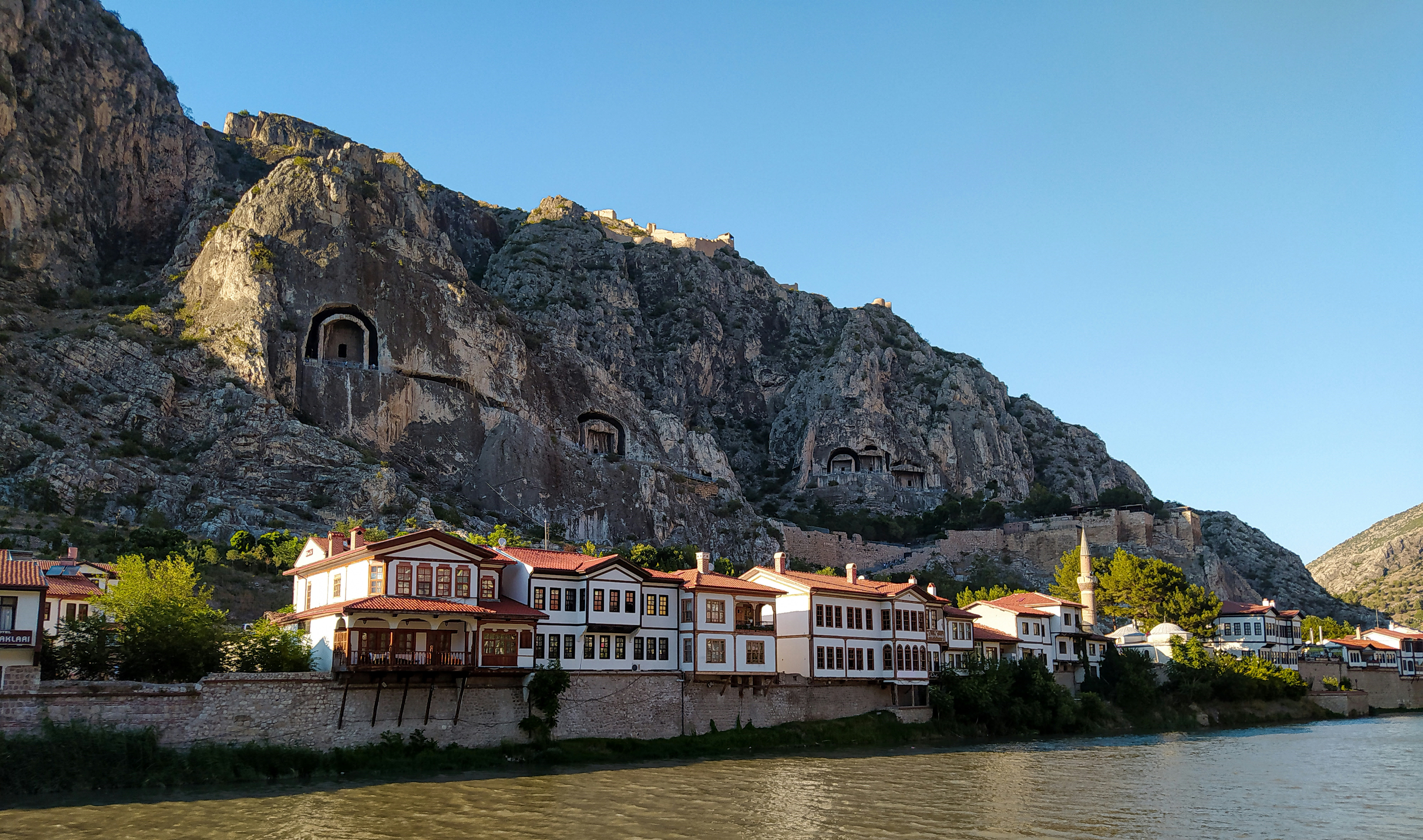
Amasya

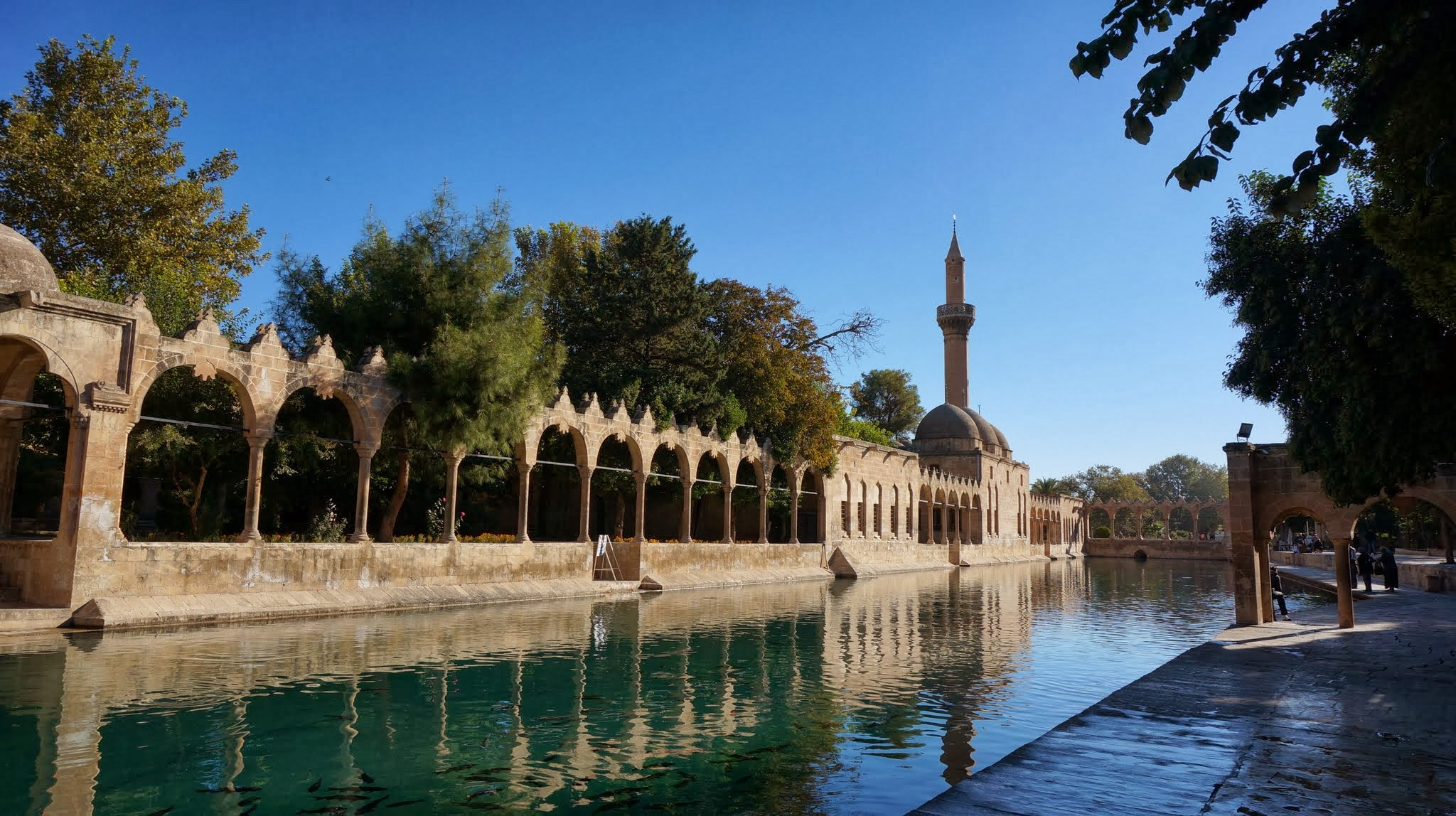
Balıklıgöl (pool of Abraham) in Şanlıurfa

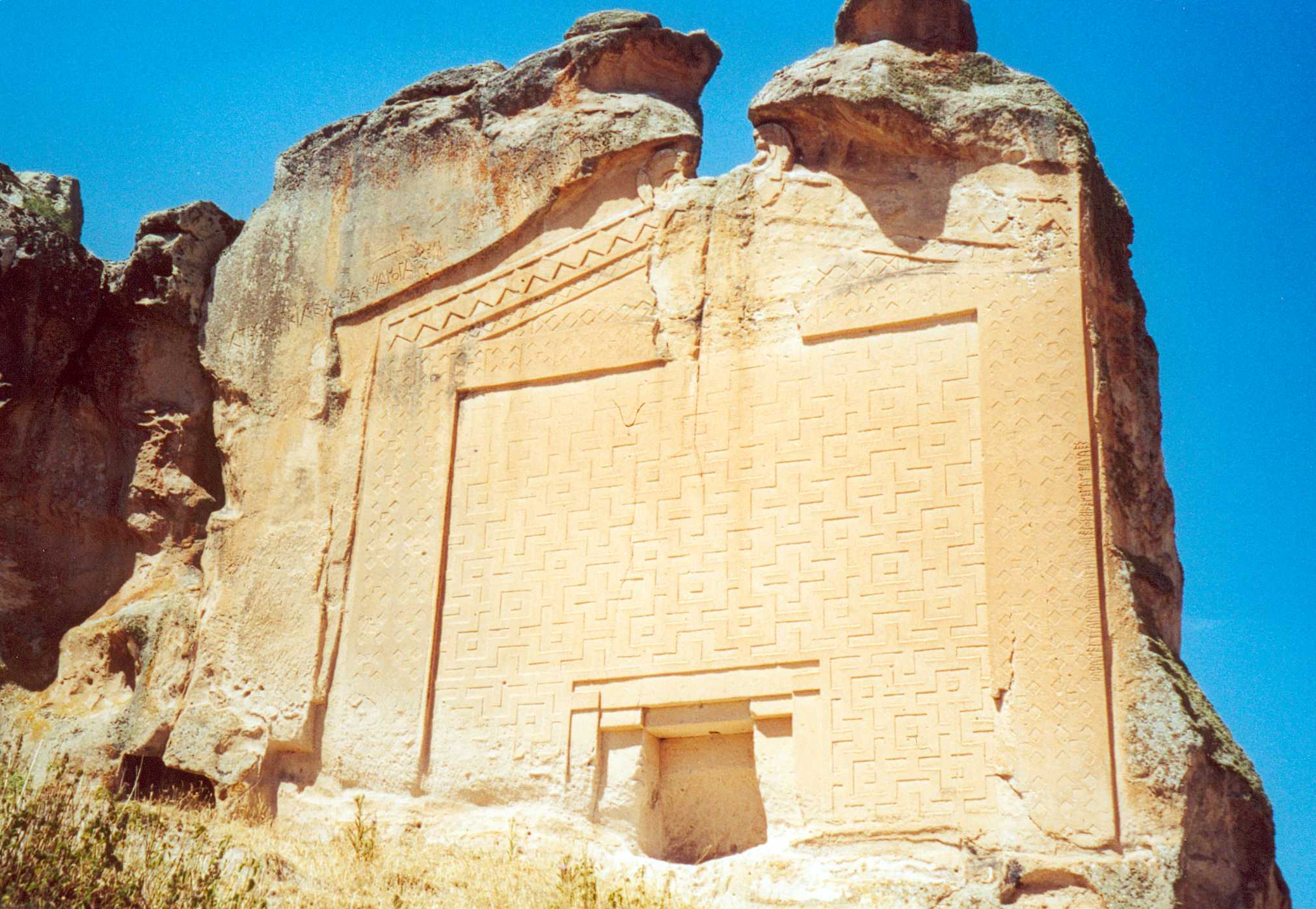
Midas monument, Eskişehir

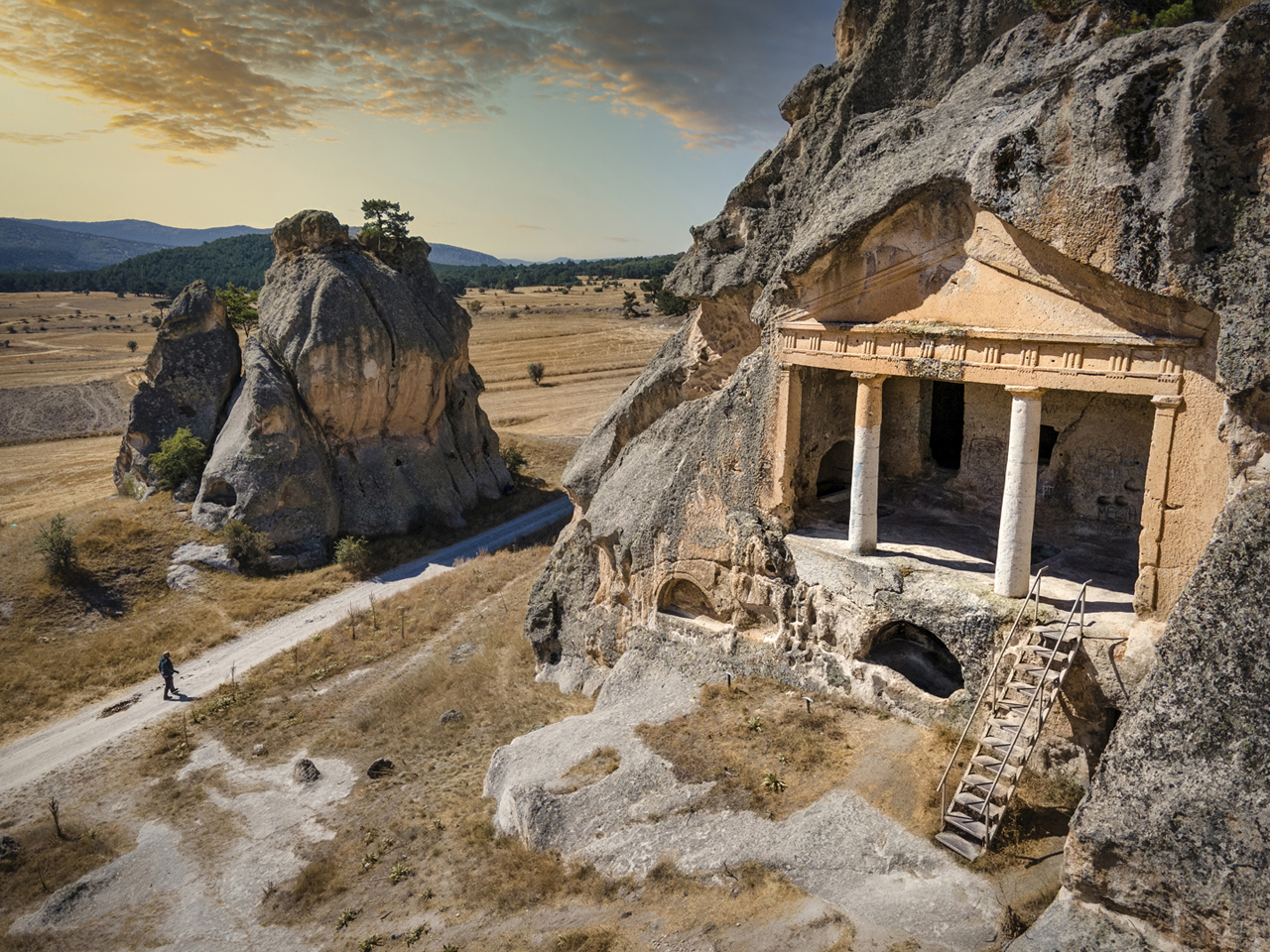
Phrygia, Afyonkarahisar

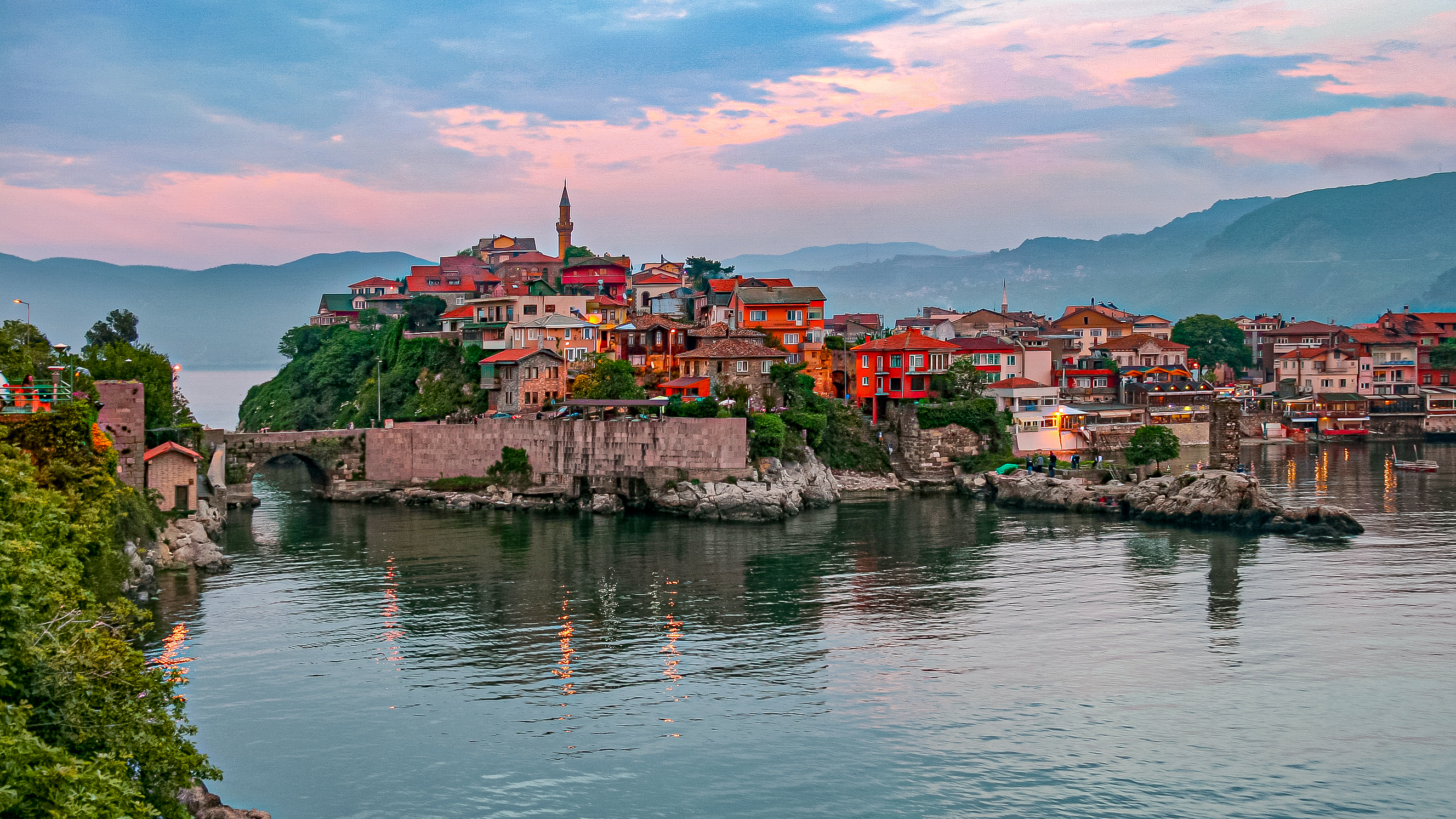
Amasra, Bartın

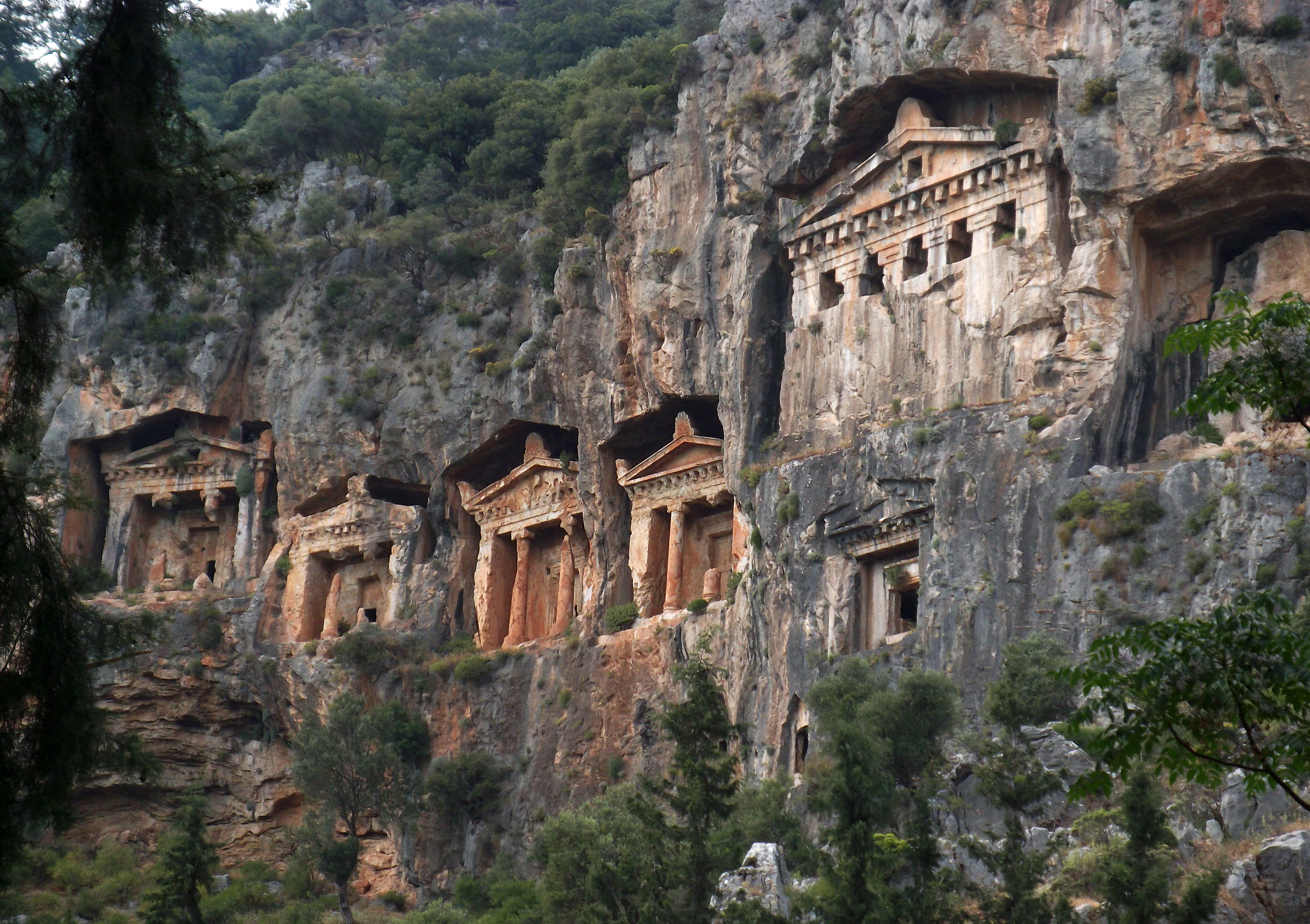
Kaunos Rock Tomb in Dalyan, Muğla

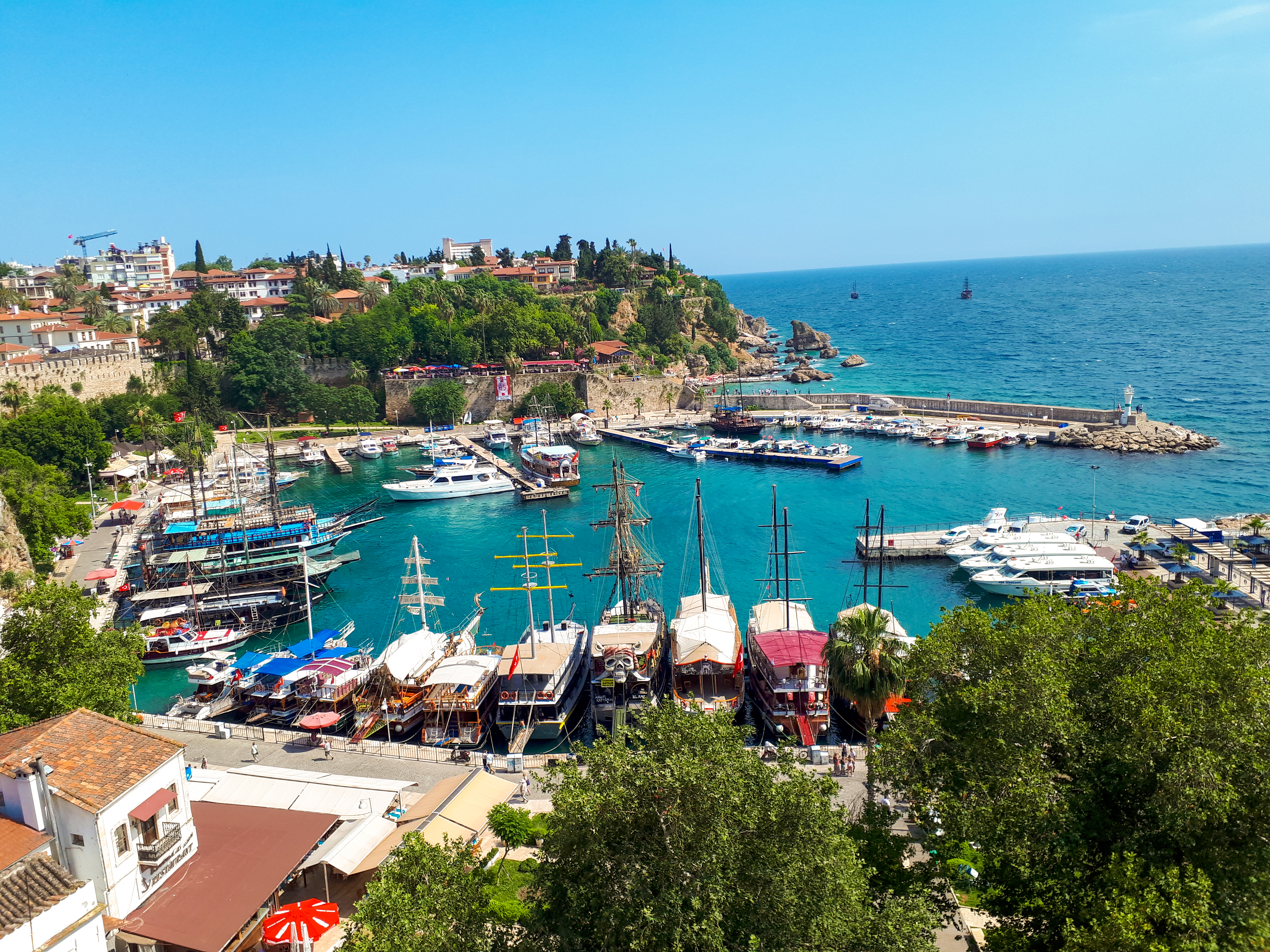
Kaleiçi, Antalya

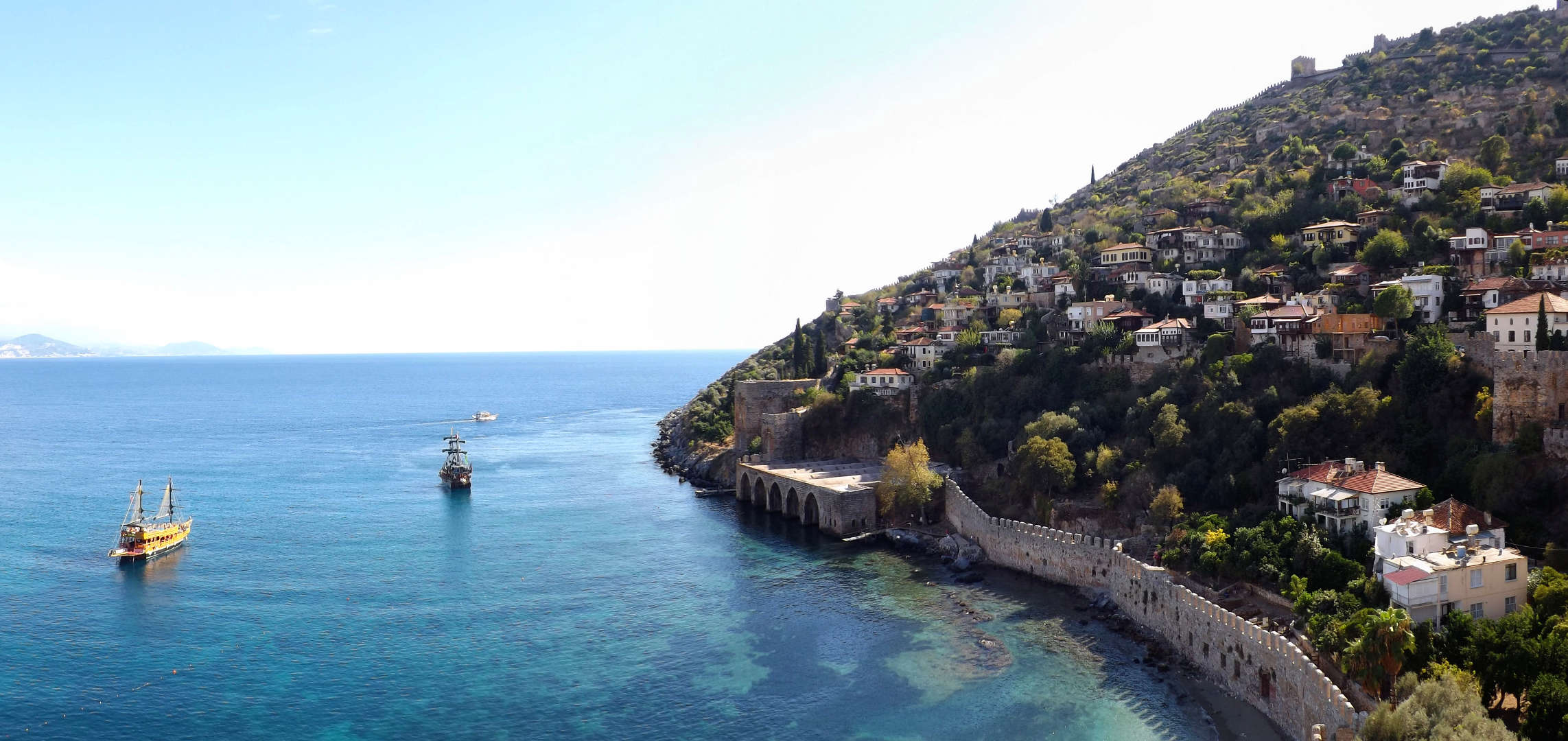
Dockyard from Seljuk era in Alanya

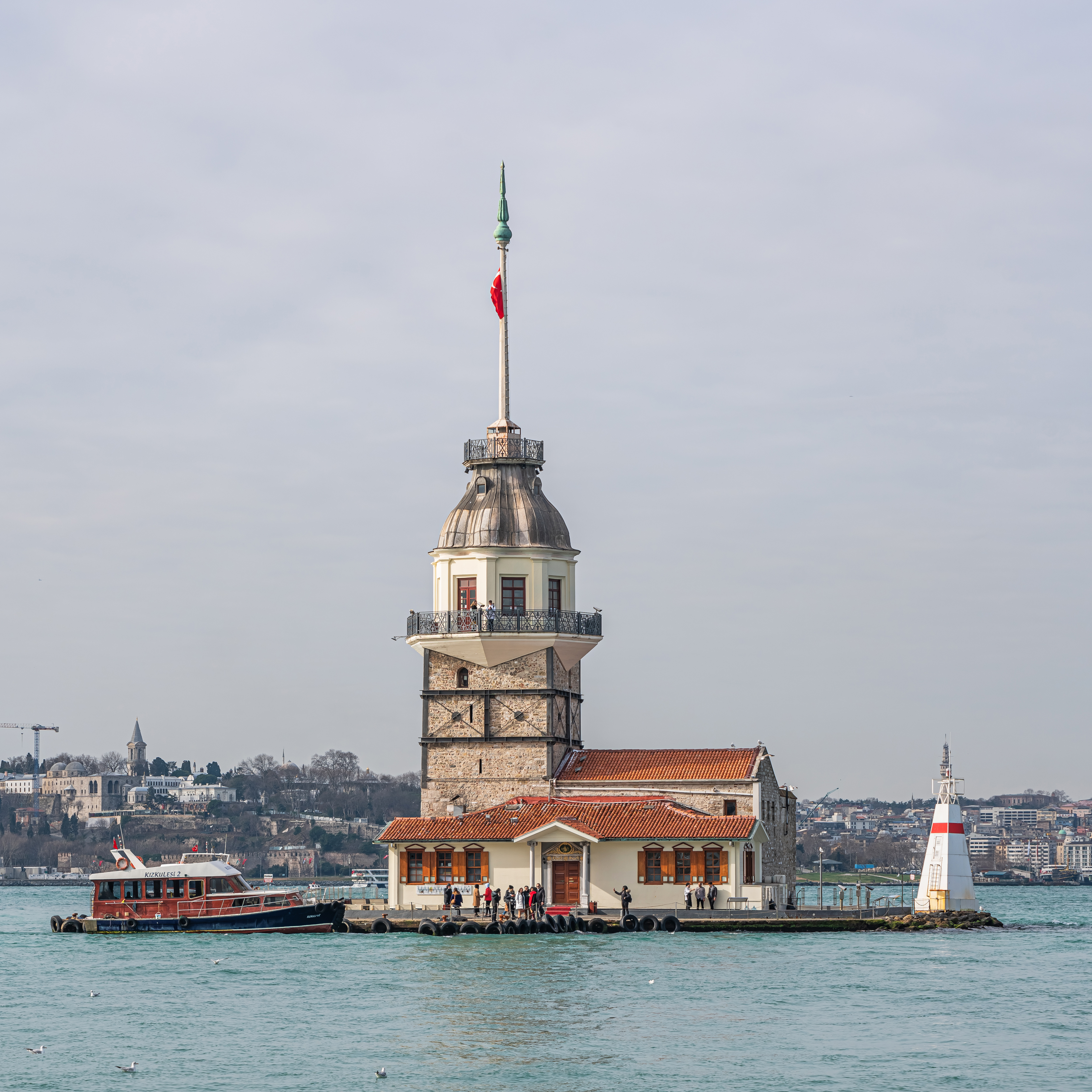
Maiden's Tower in Istanbul

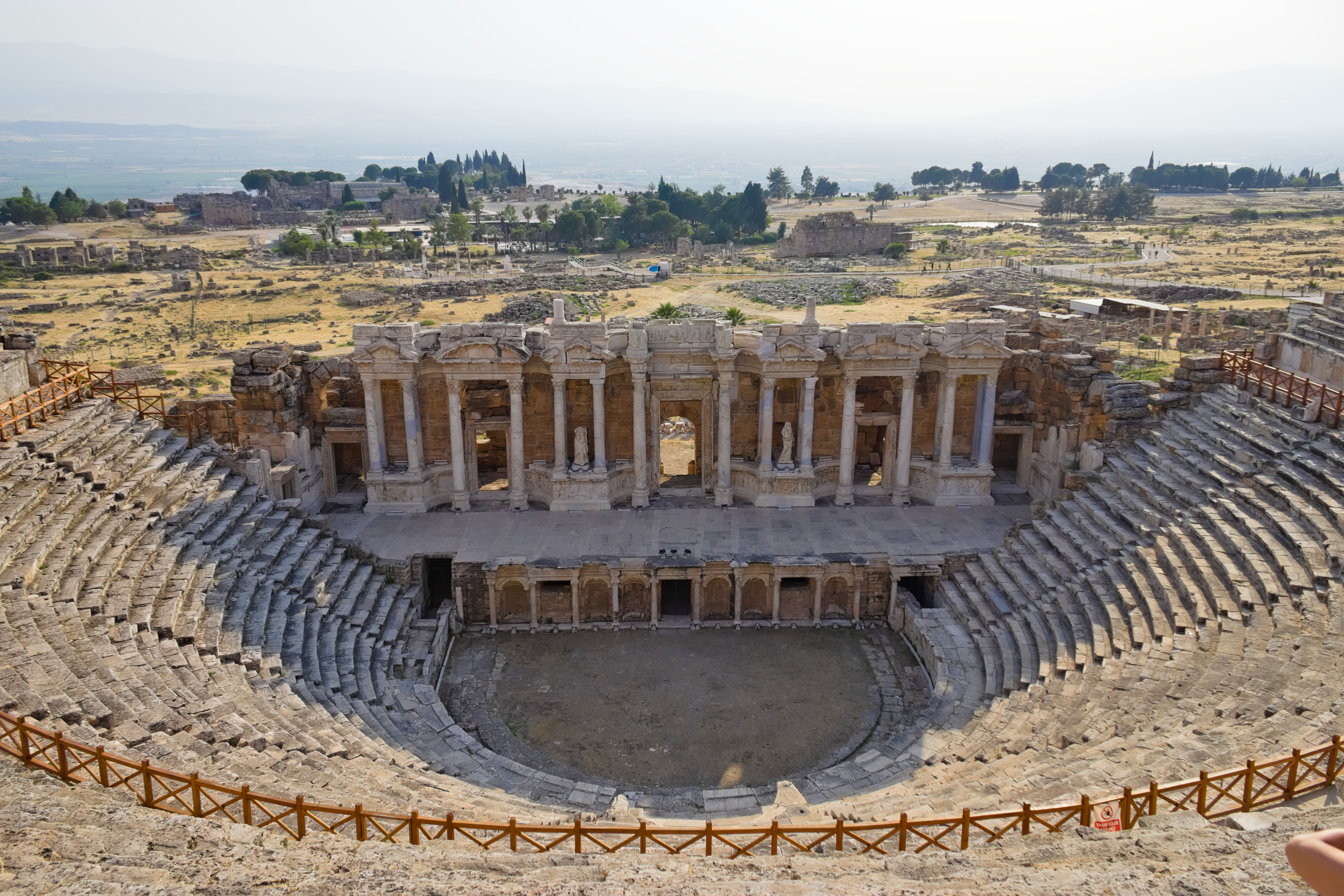
Theatre of Hierapolis in Denizli

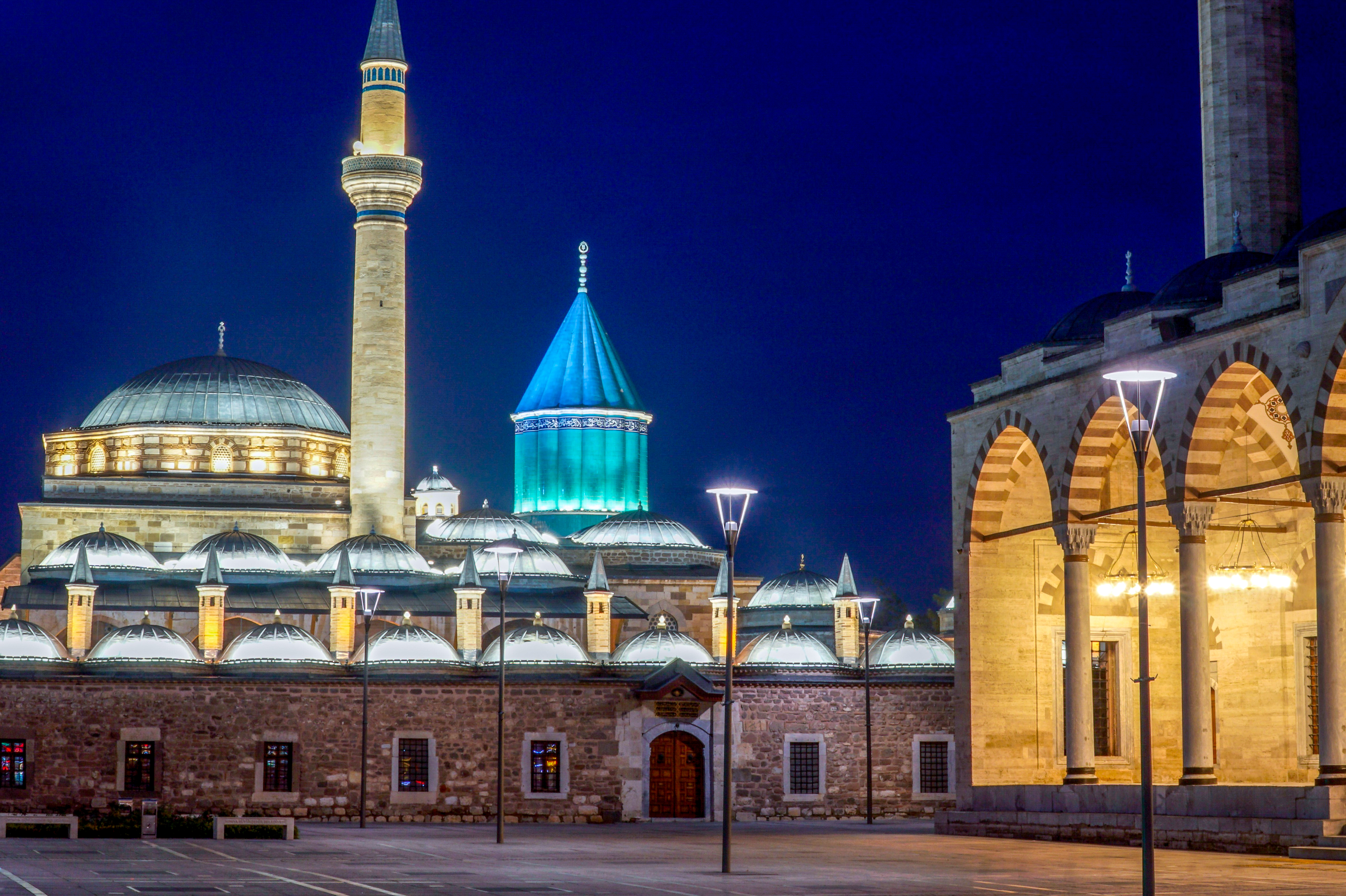
Tomb of Rumi (Mevlana Museum) in Konya

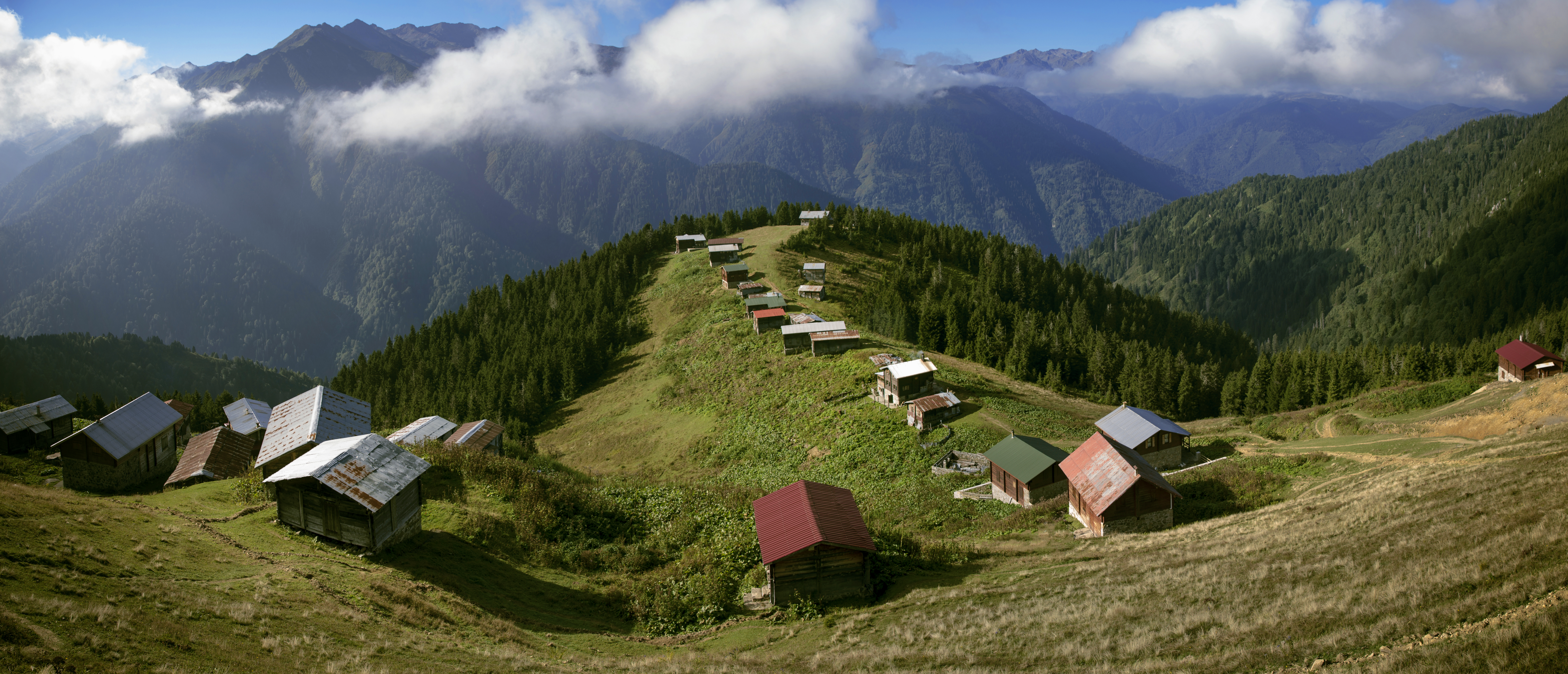
Pokut plateau, Rize

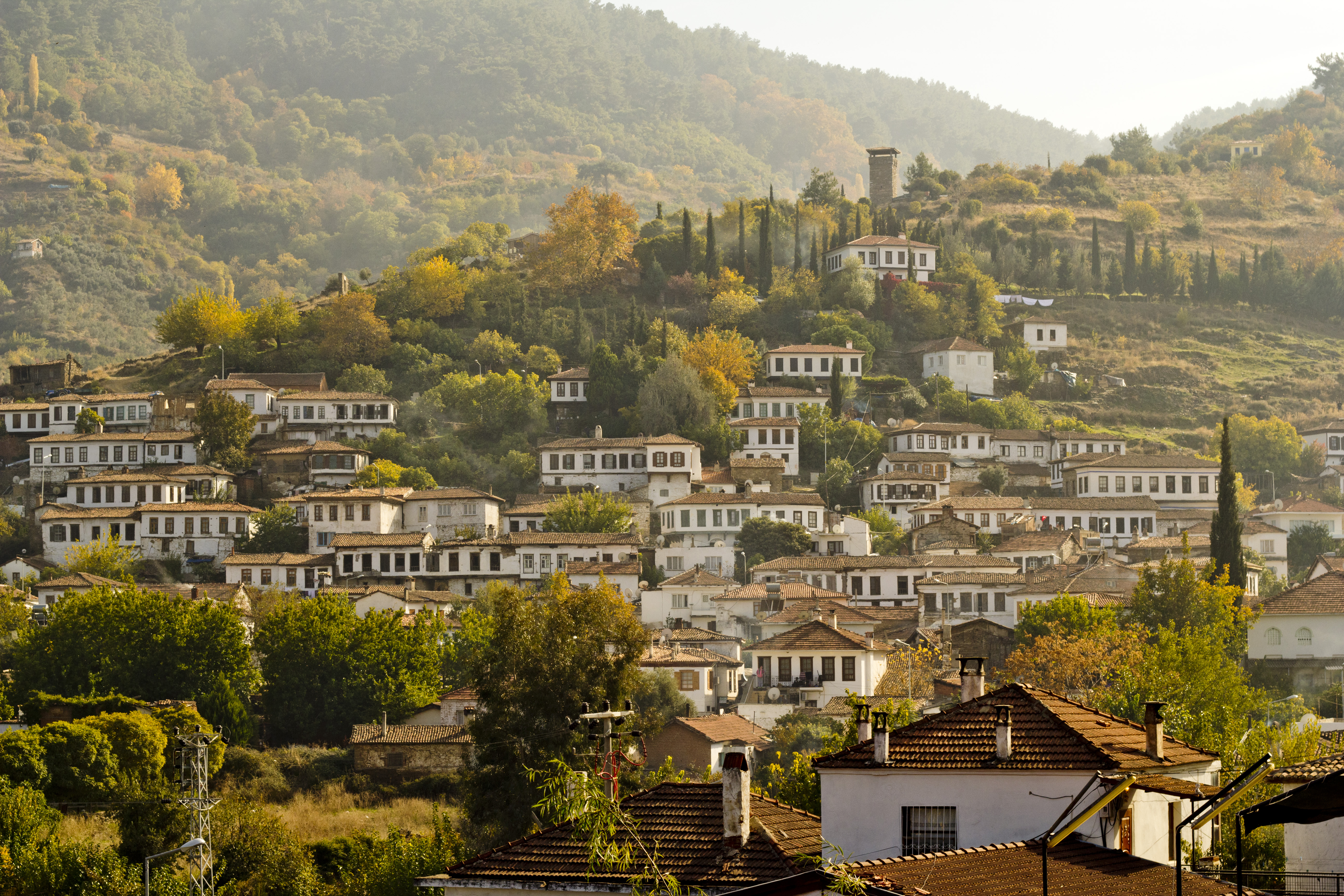
Şirince is an old neighbourhood in Selçuk, İzmir

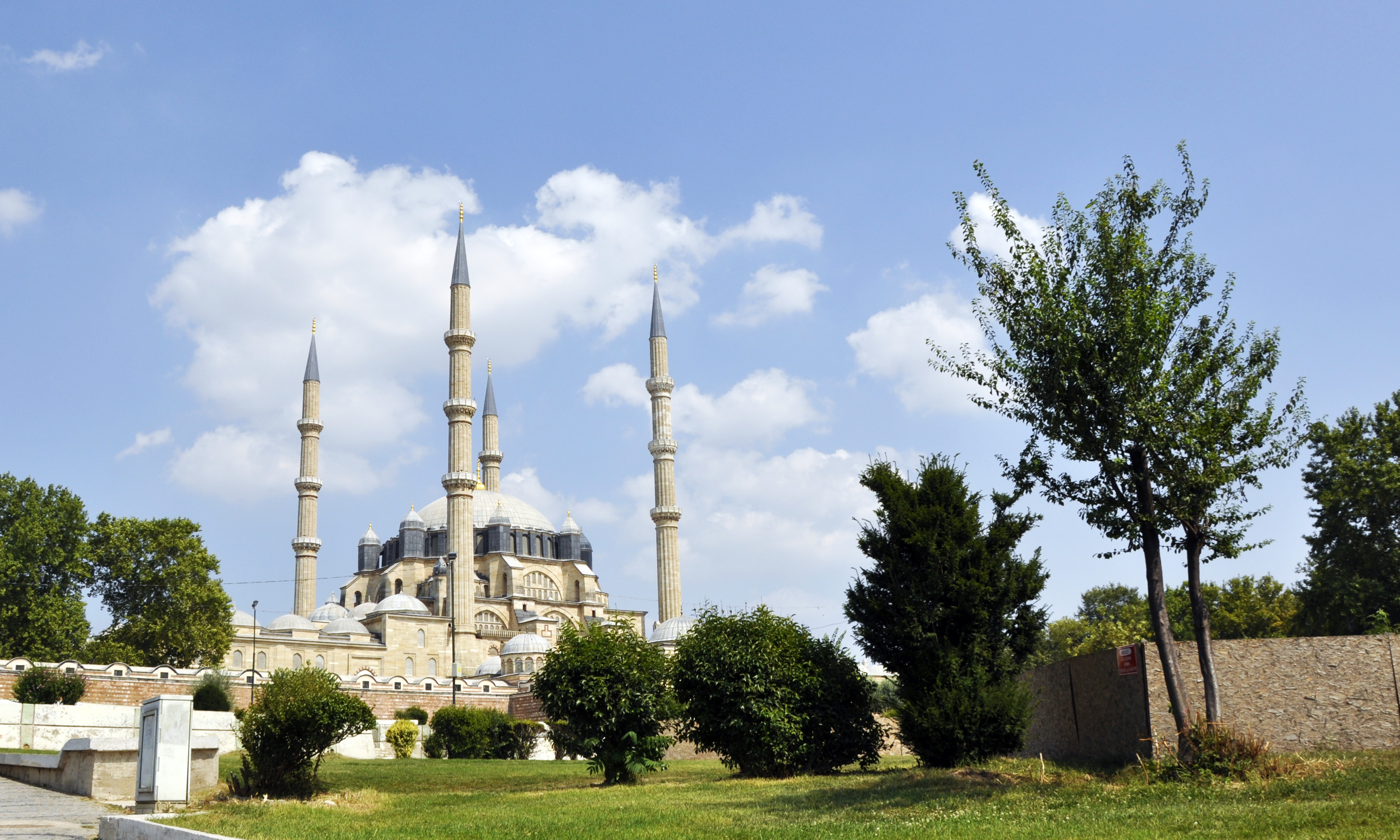
Selimiye Ottoman imperial mosque built by the imperial architect Mimar Sinan in Edirne

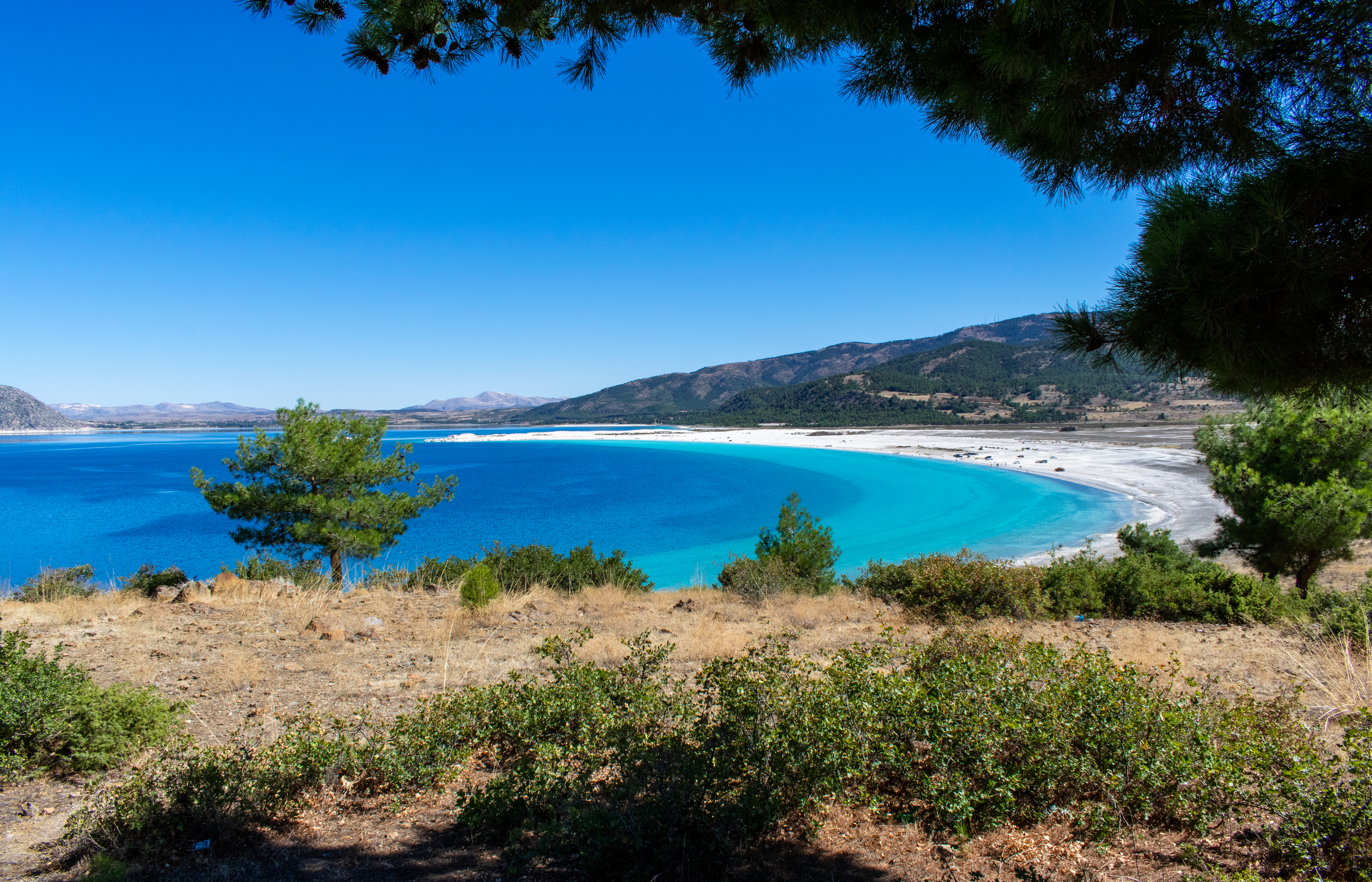
Lake Salda in Burdur

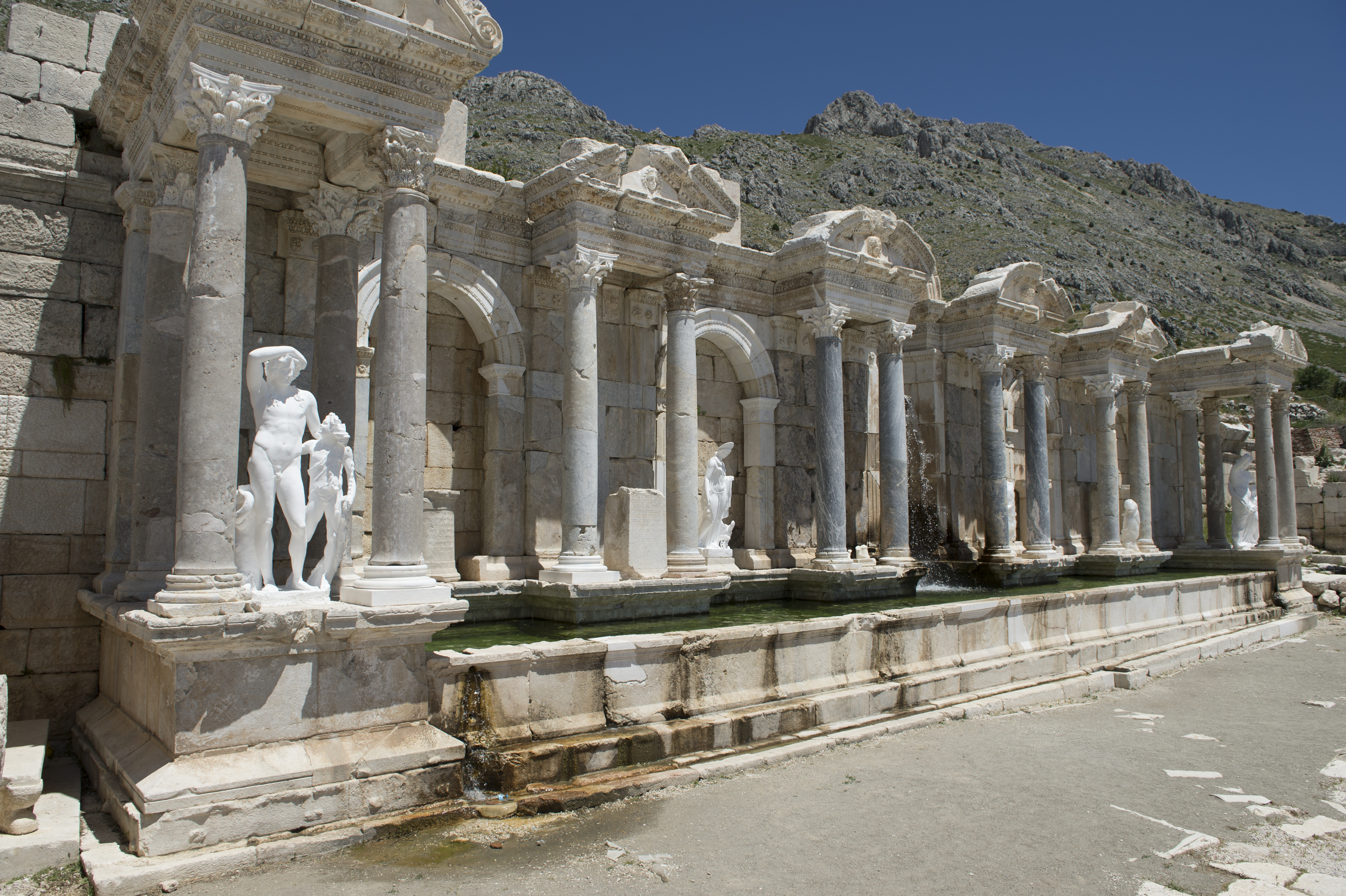
Sagalassos ancient city in Burdur

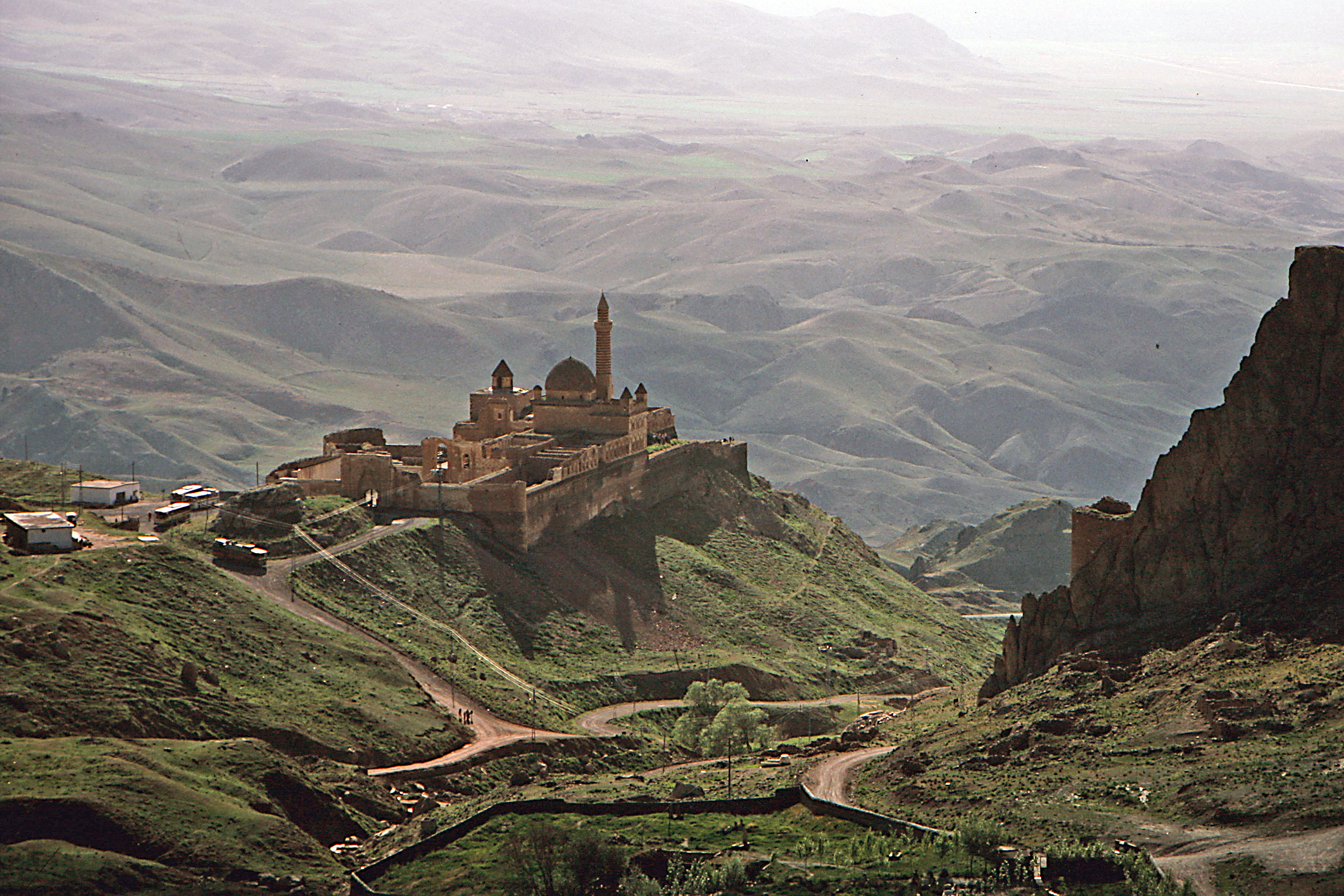
Ishak Pasha Palace in the Doğubeyazıt district of Ağrı

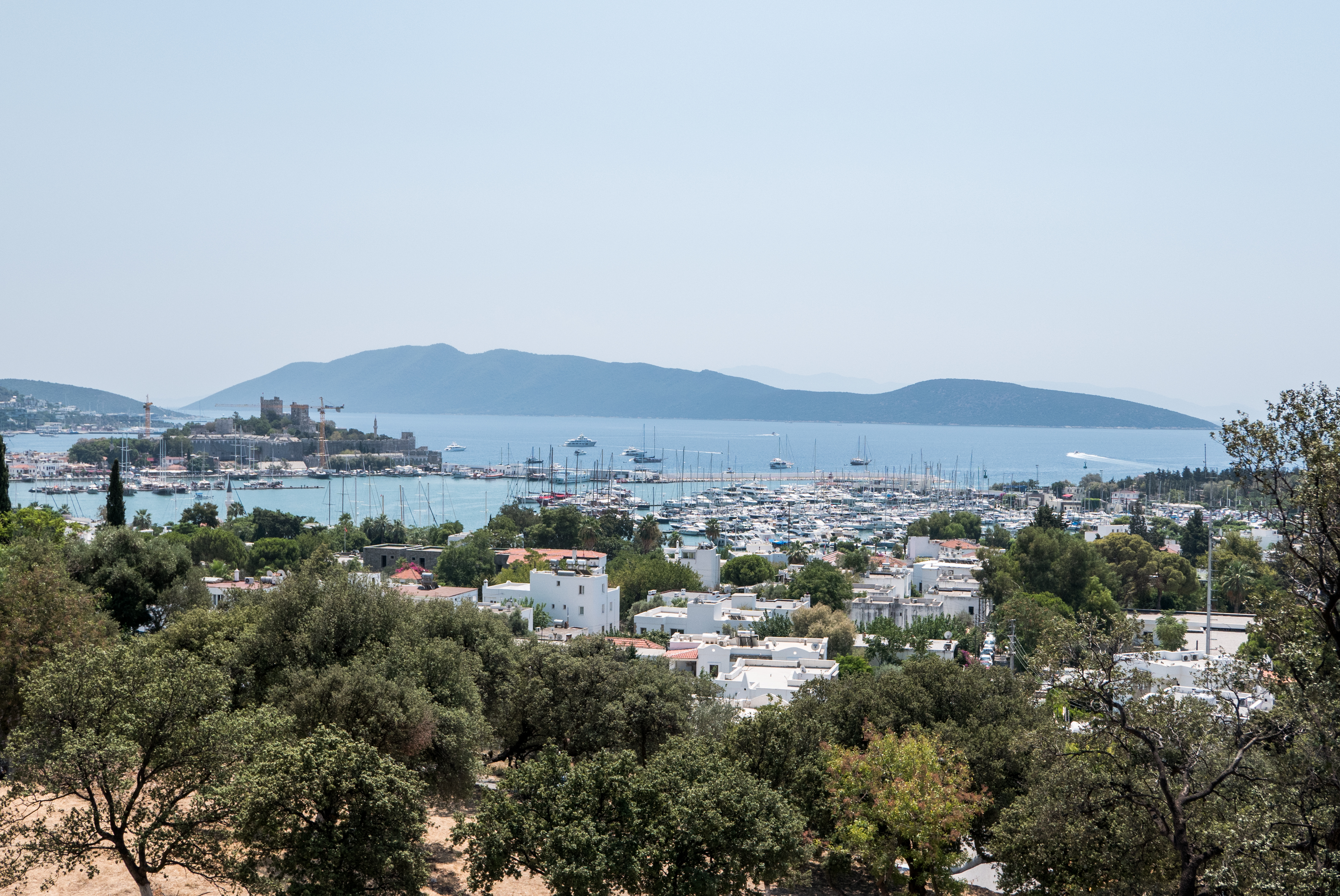
Bodrum, Muğla

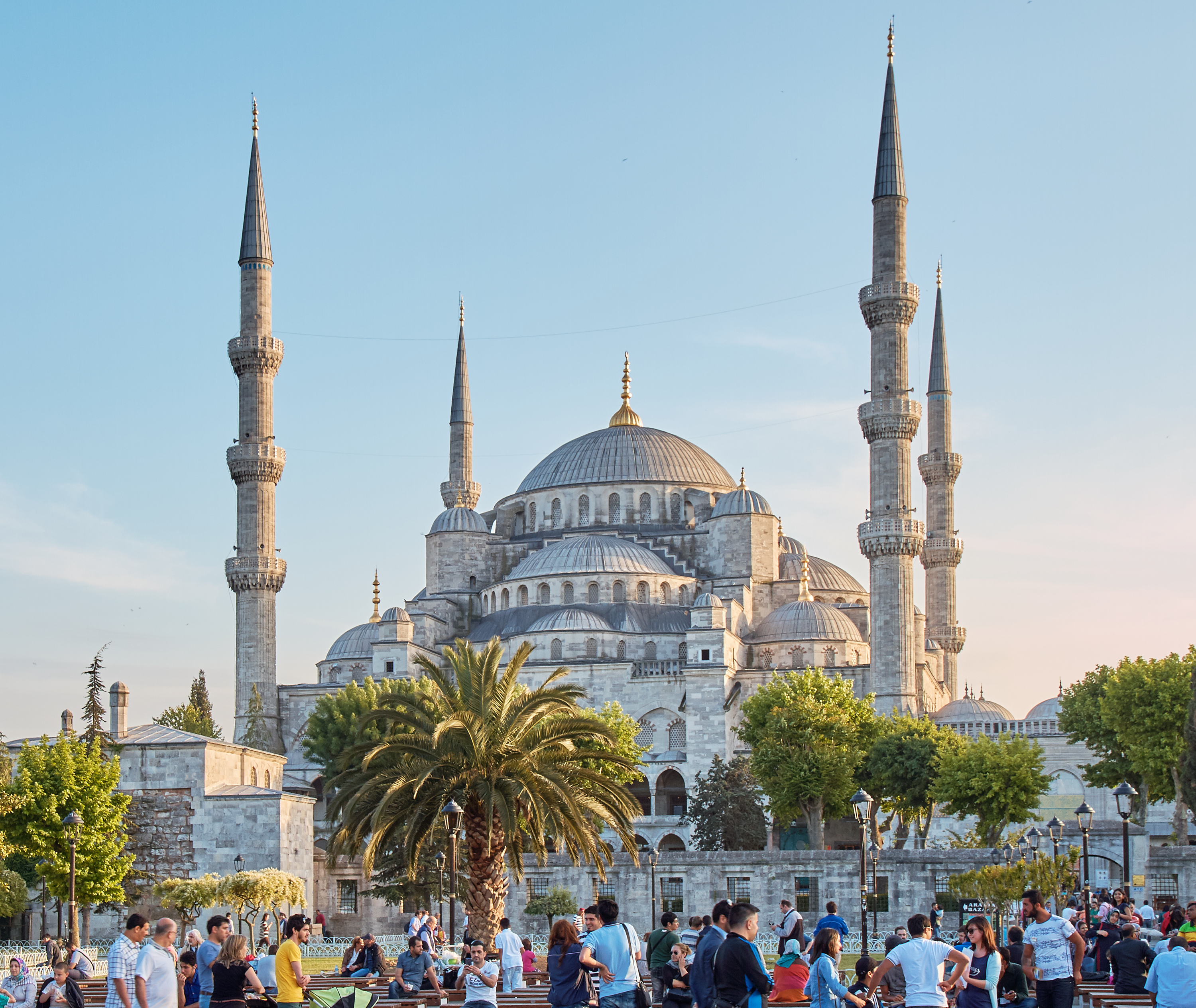
Blue Mosque, Istanbul

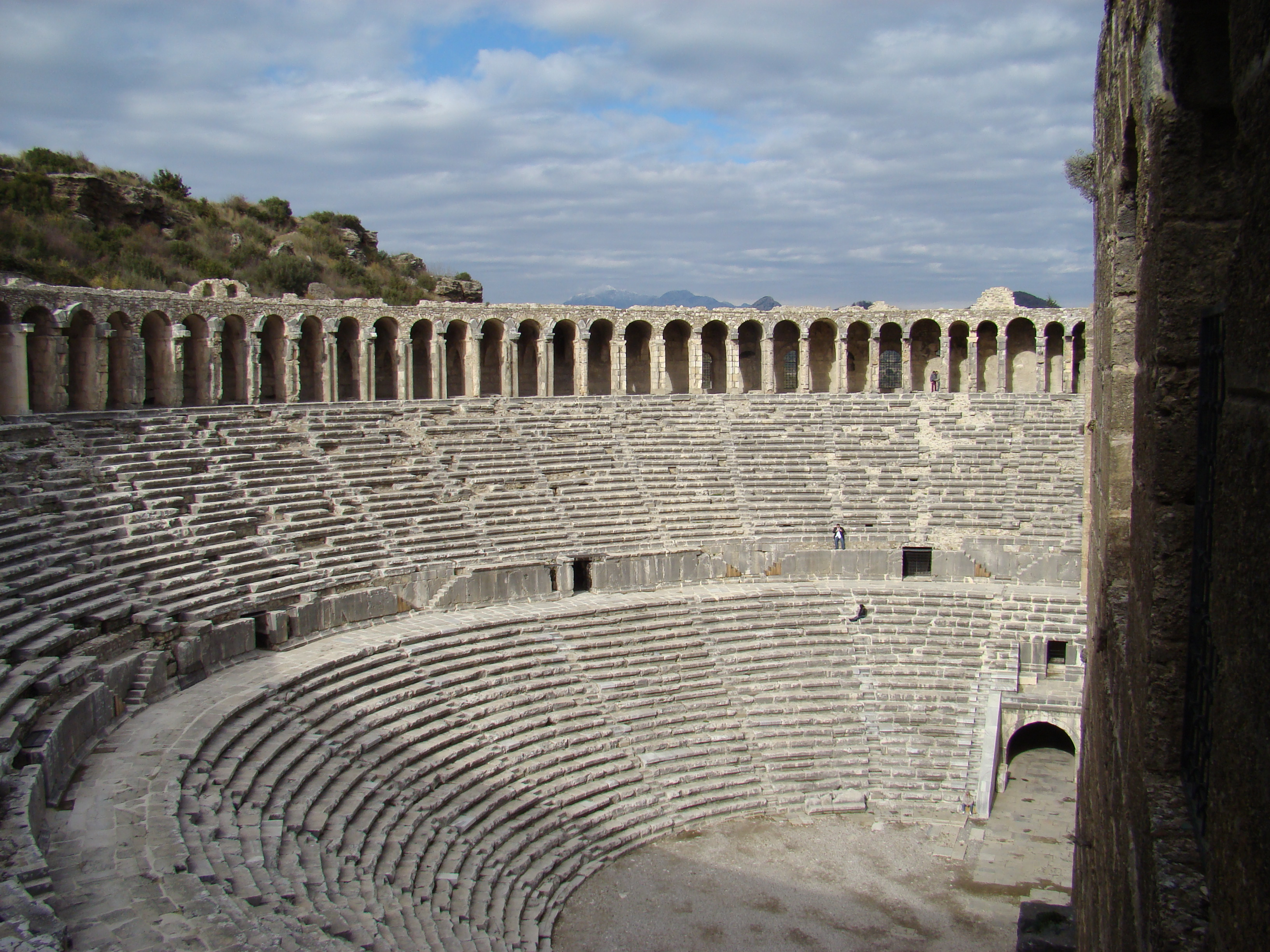
Roman Theatre of Aspendos in Antalya

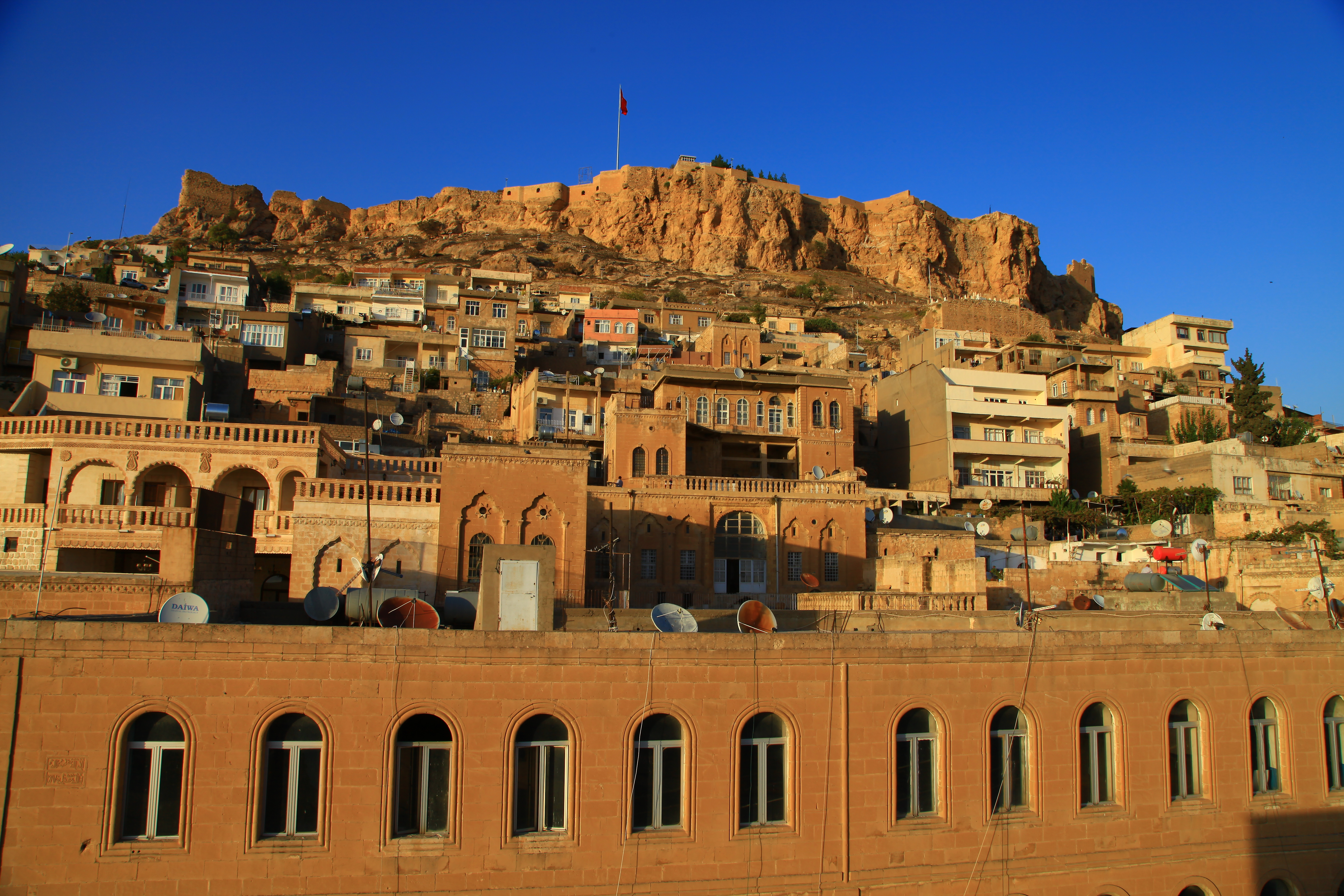
Mardin

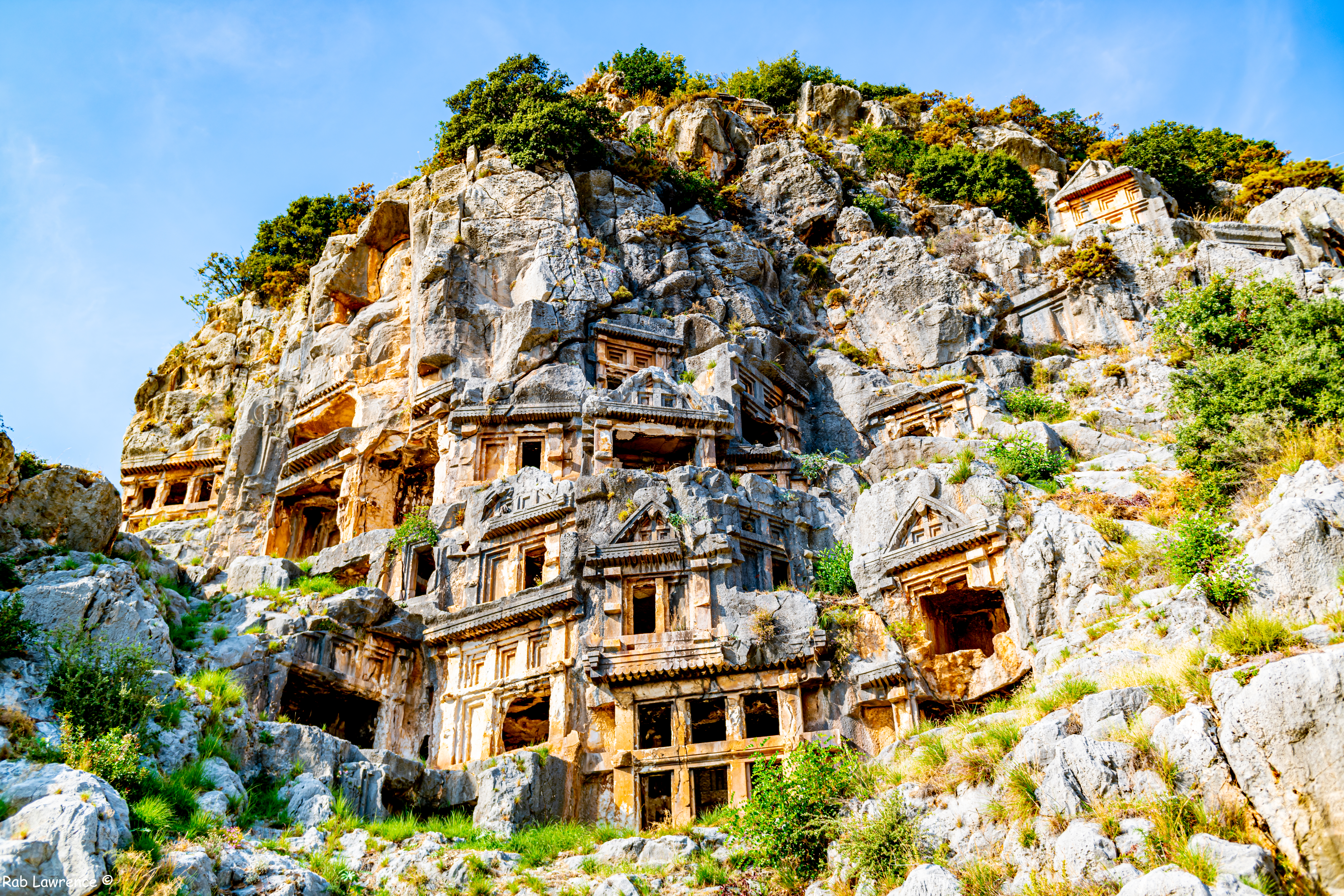
Myra Rock Tombs in Lycia, Antalya

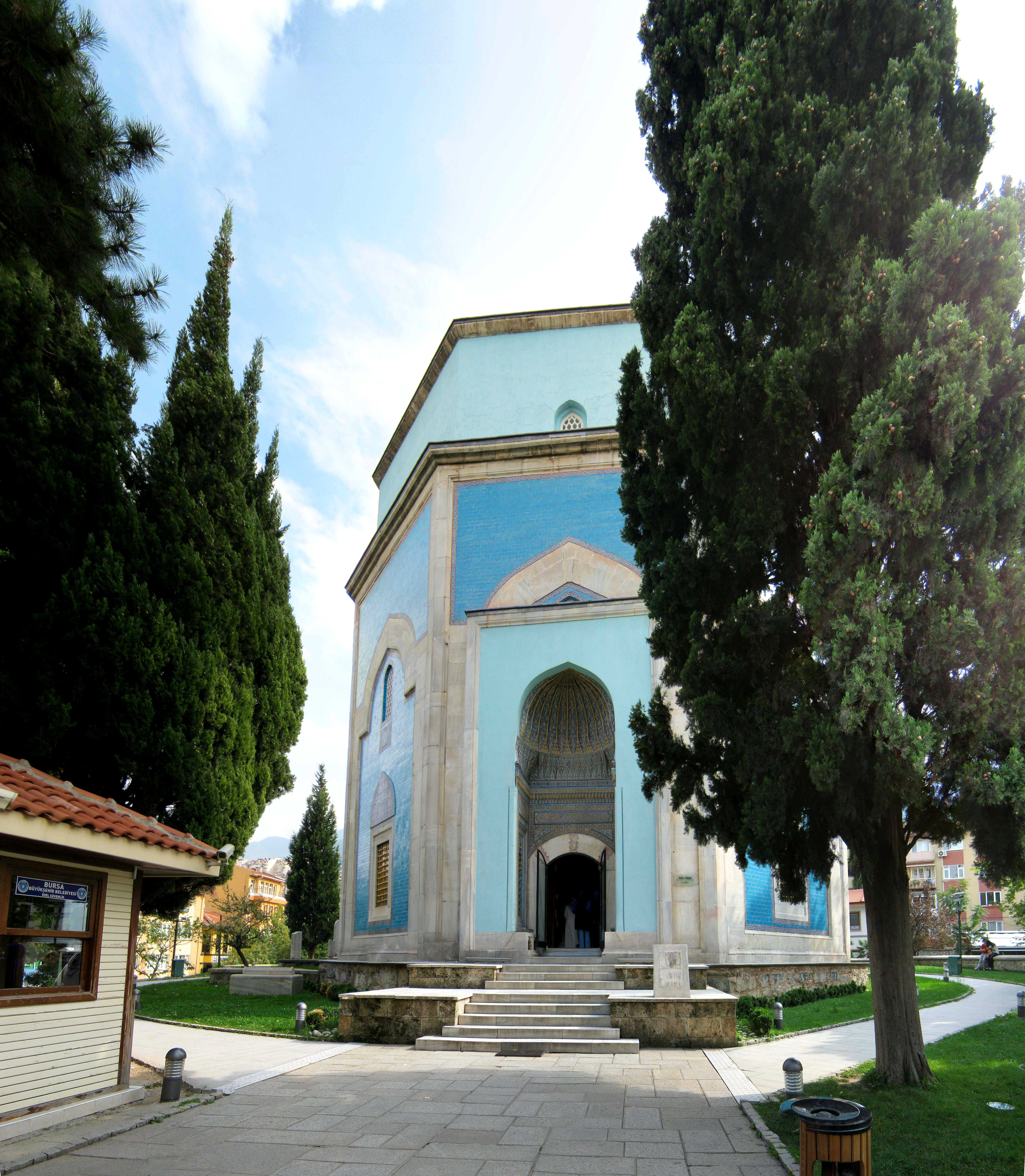
Green Tomb, Bursa

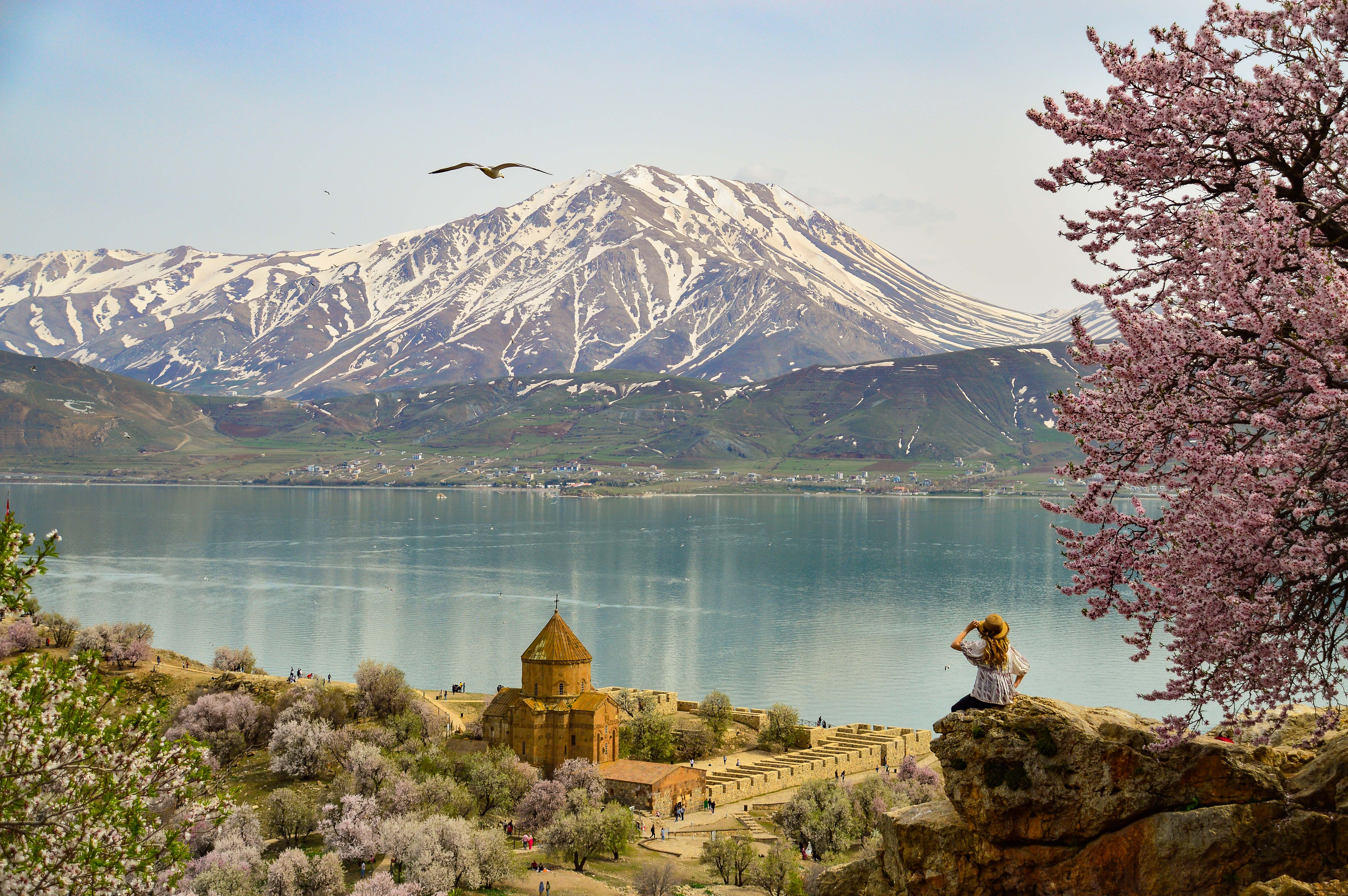
Akdamar Island in Lake Van

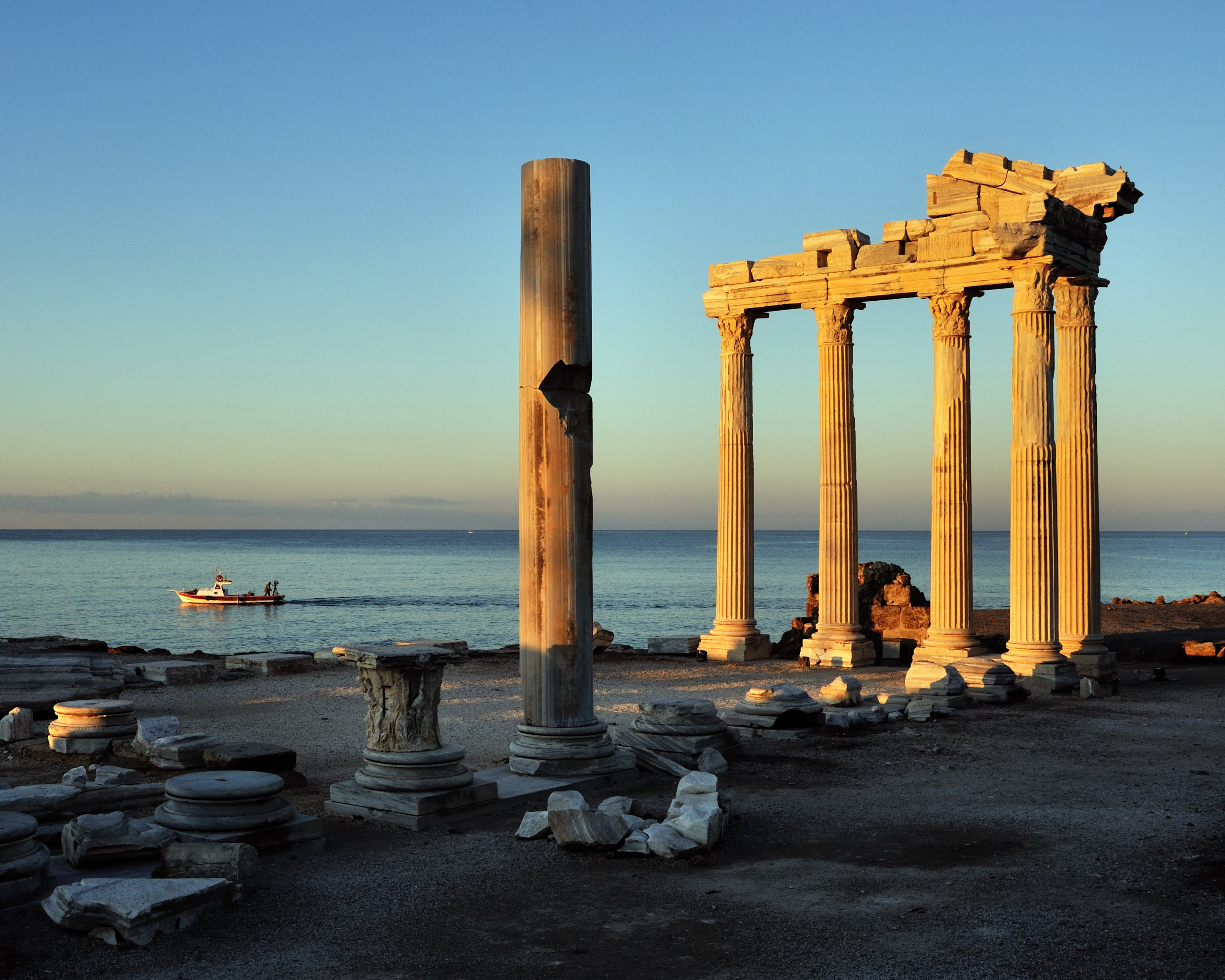
Temple of Apollo, Side

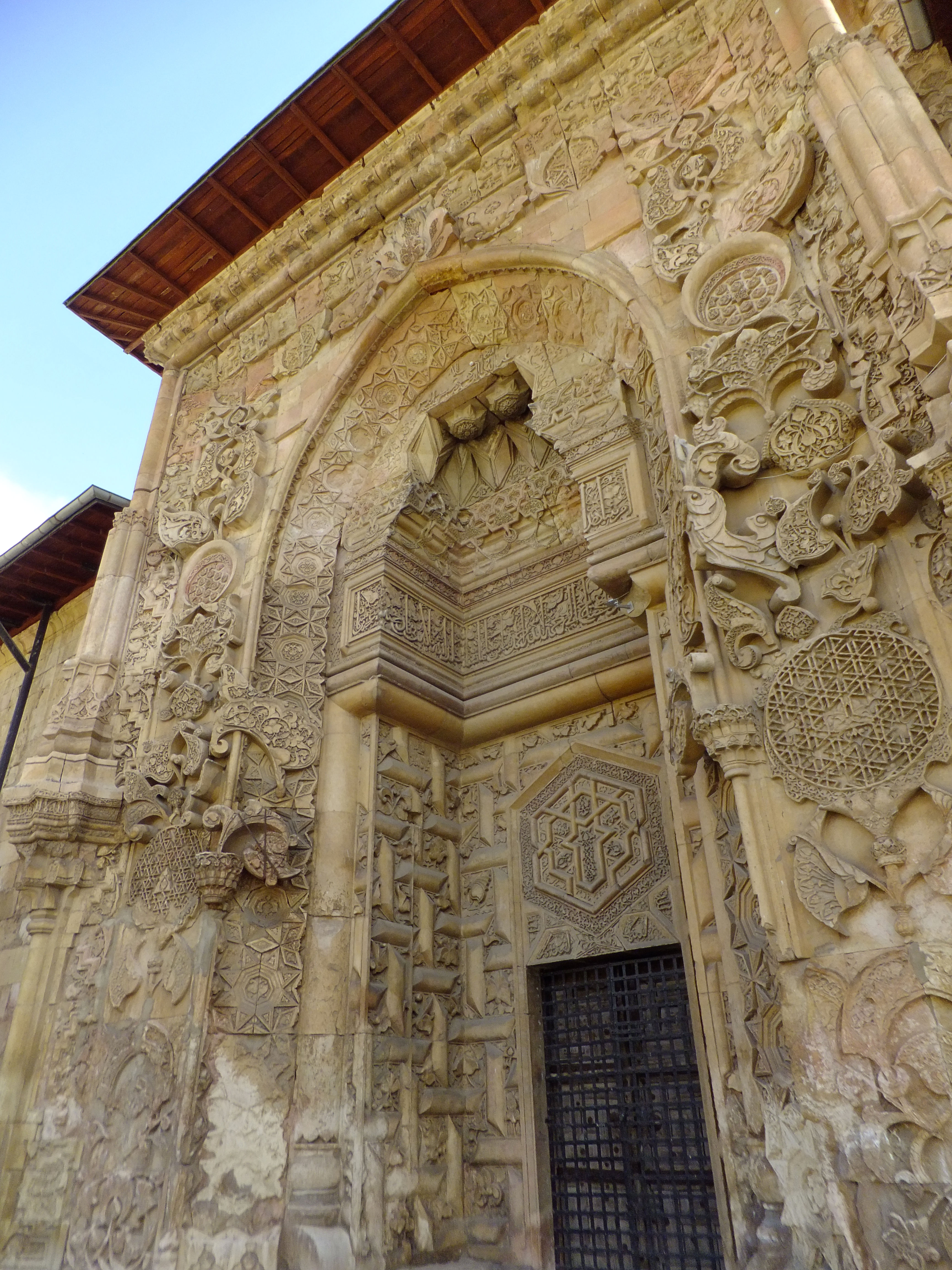
Divriği Great Mosque in Sivas

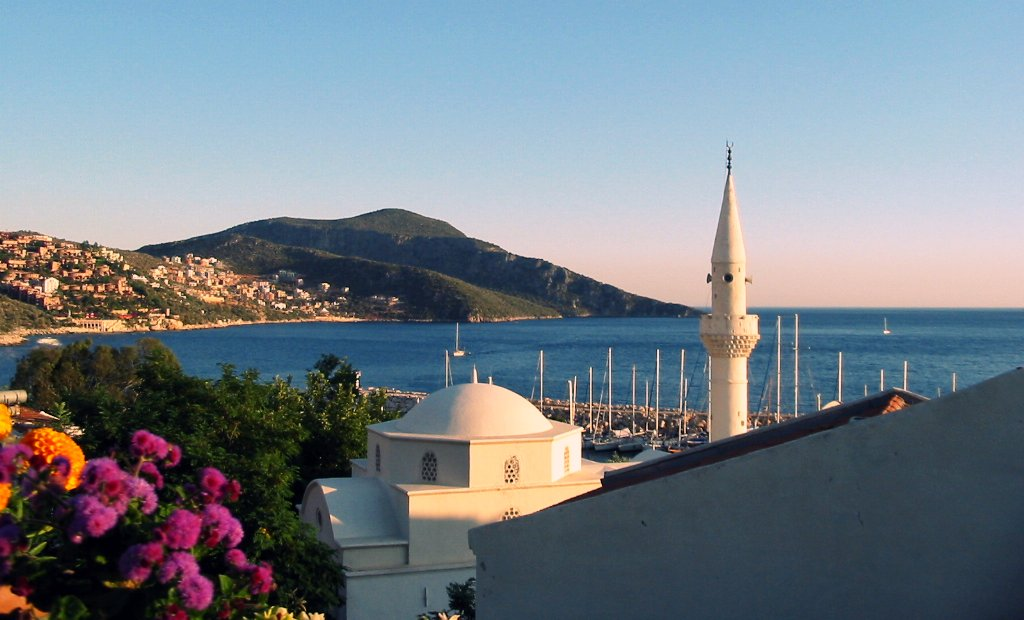
Kalkan, Antalya

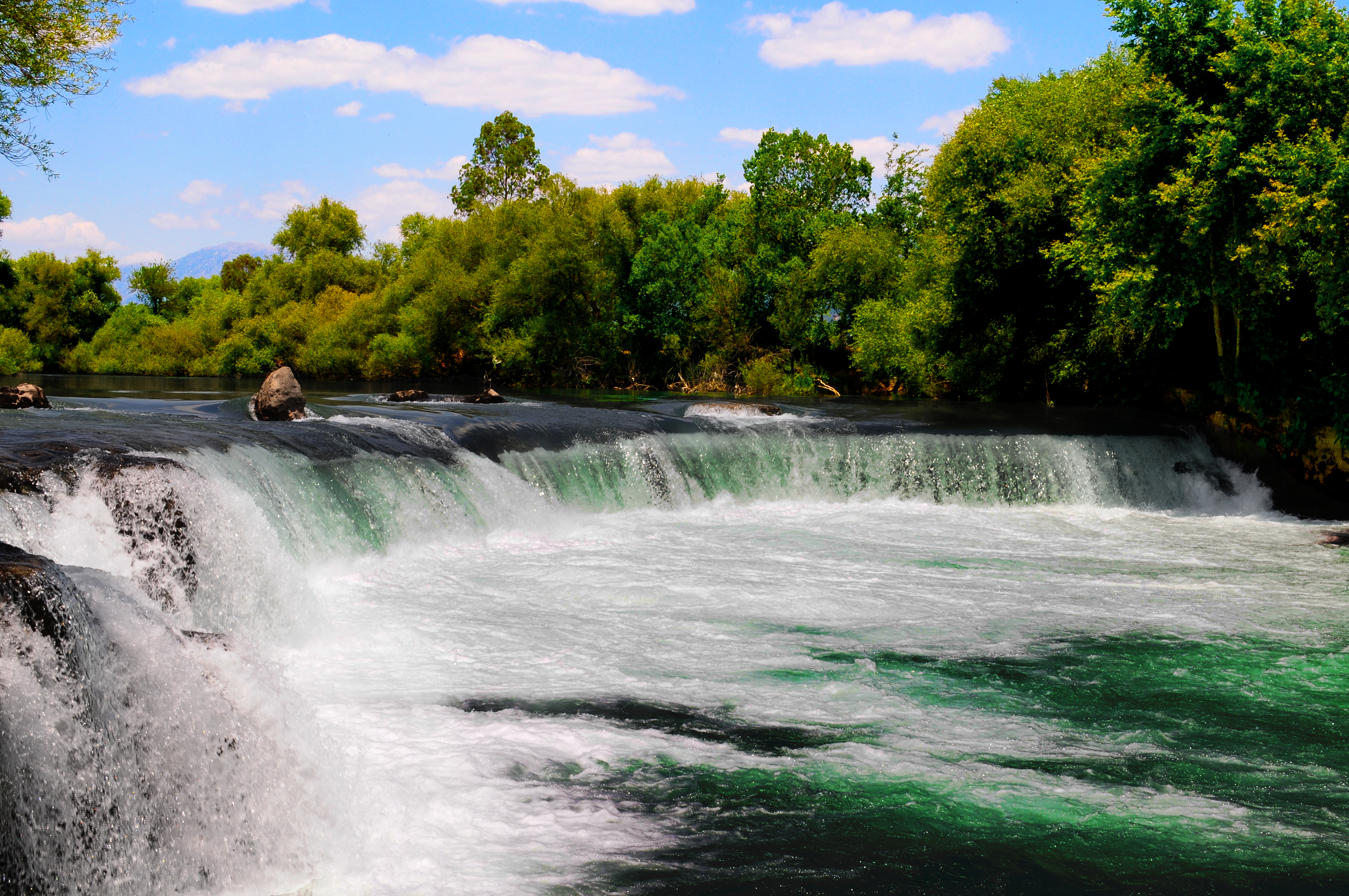
Manavgat Waterfall

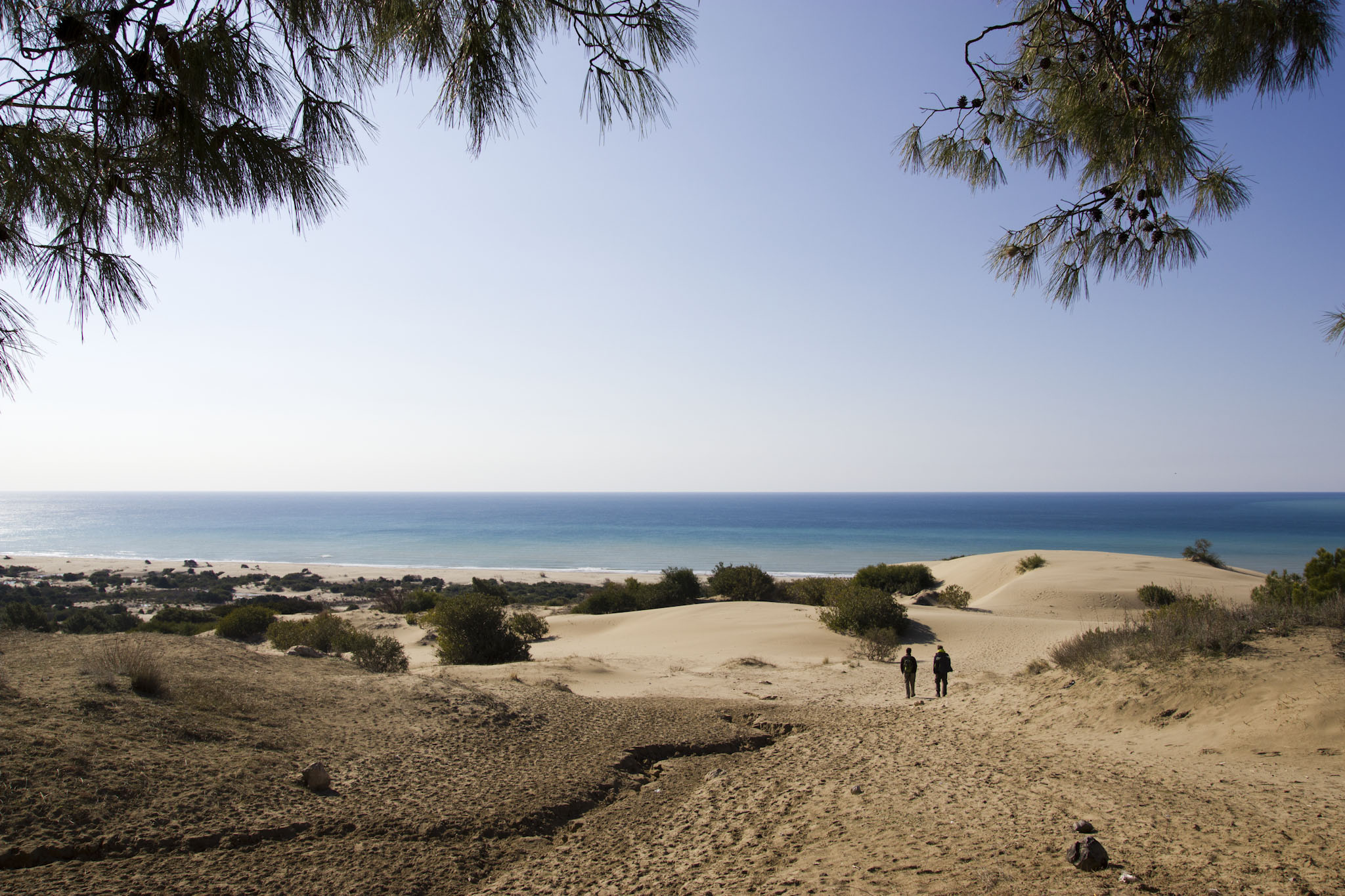
Patara beach on Turkish Riviera

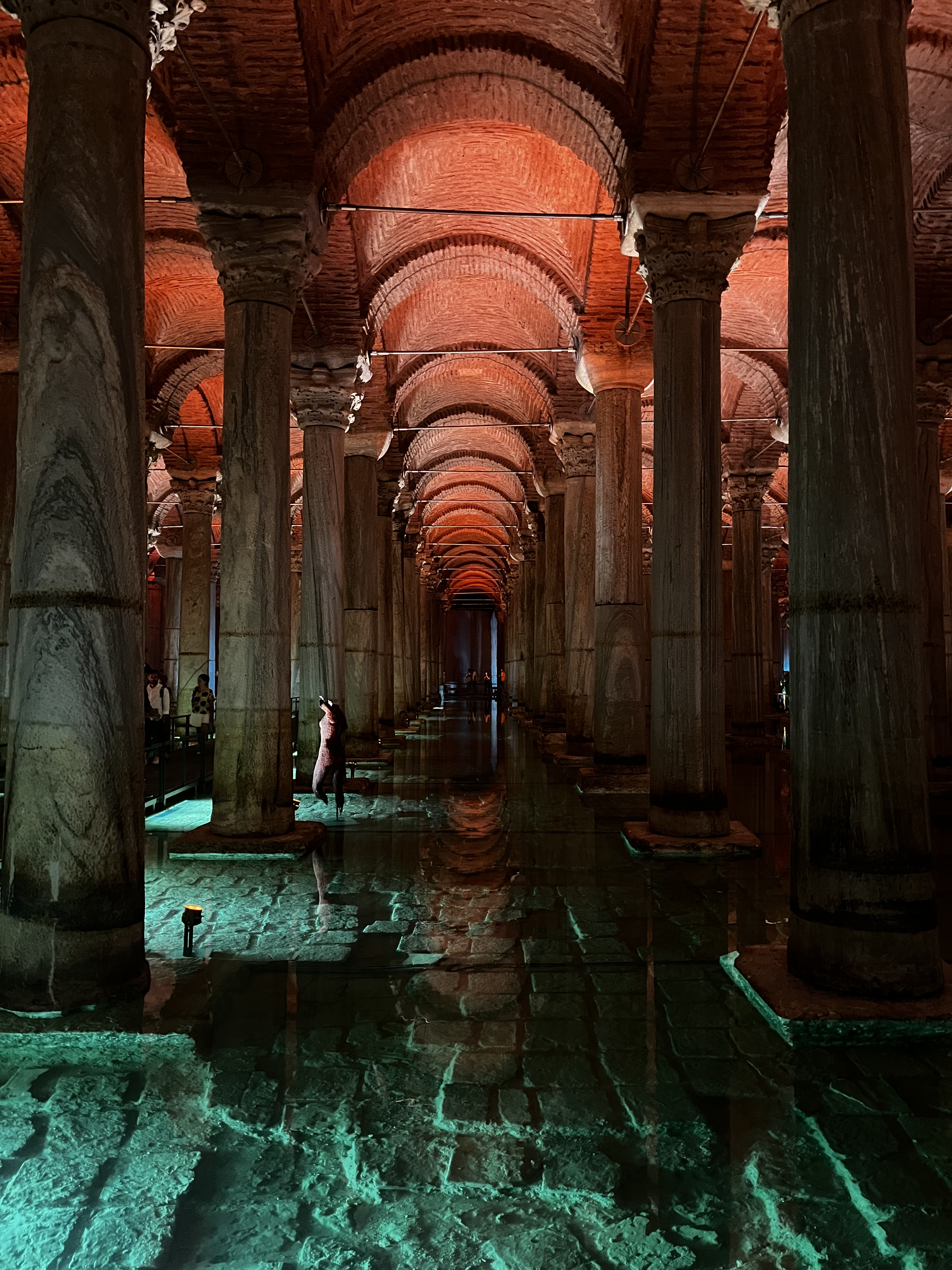
Basilica Cistern

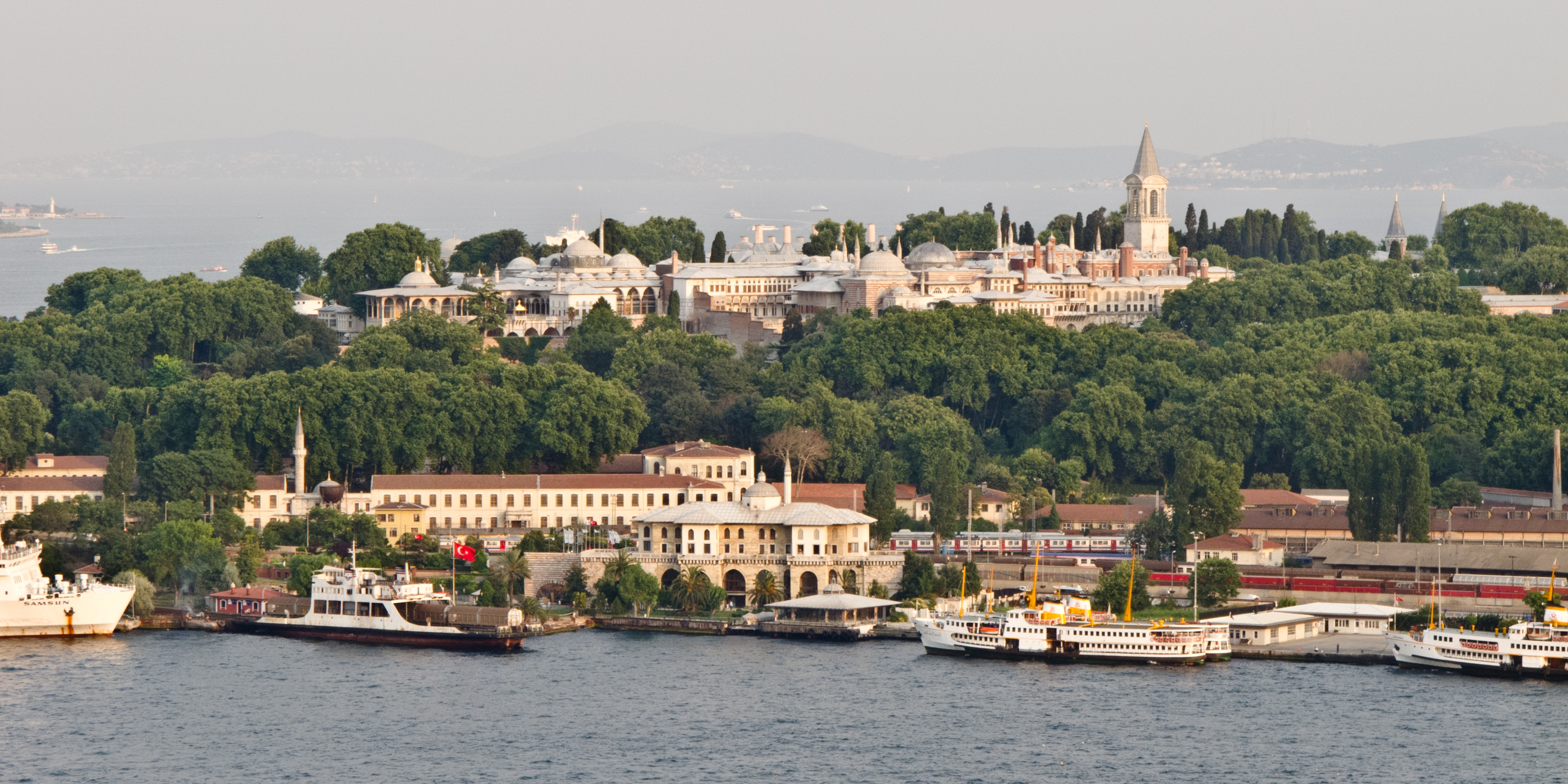
Topkapi Palace

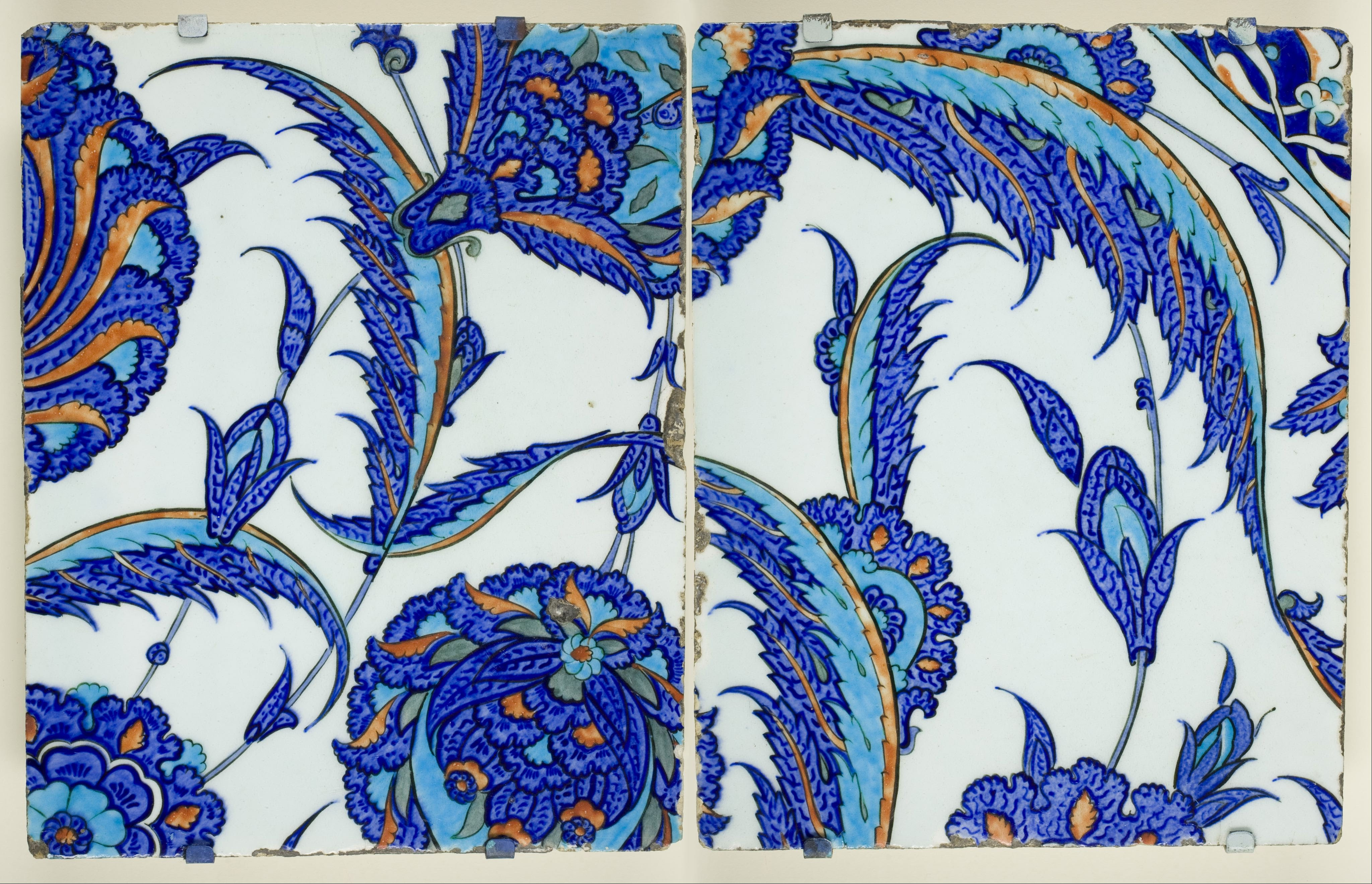
Iznik Pottery is a decorated ceramic and UNESCO intangible Cultural Element of Turkey

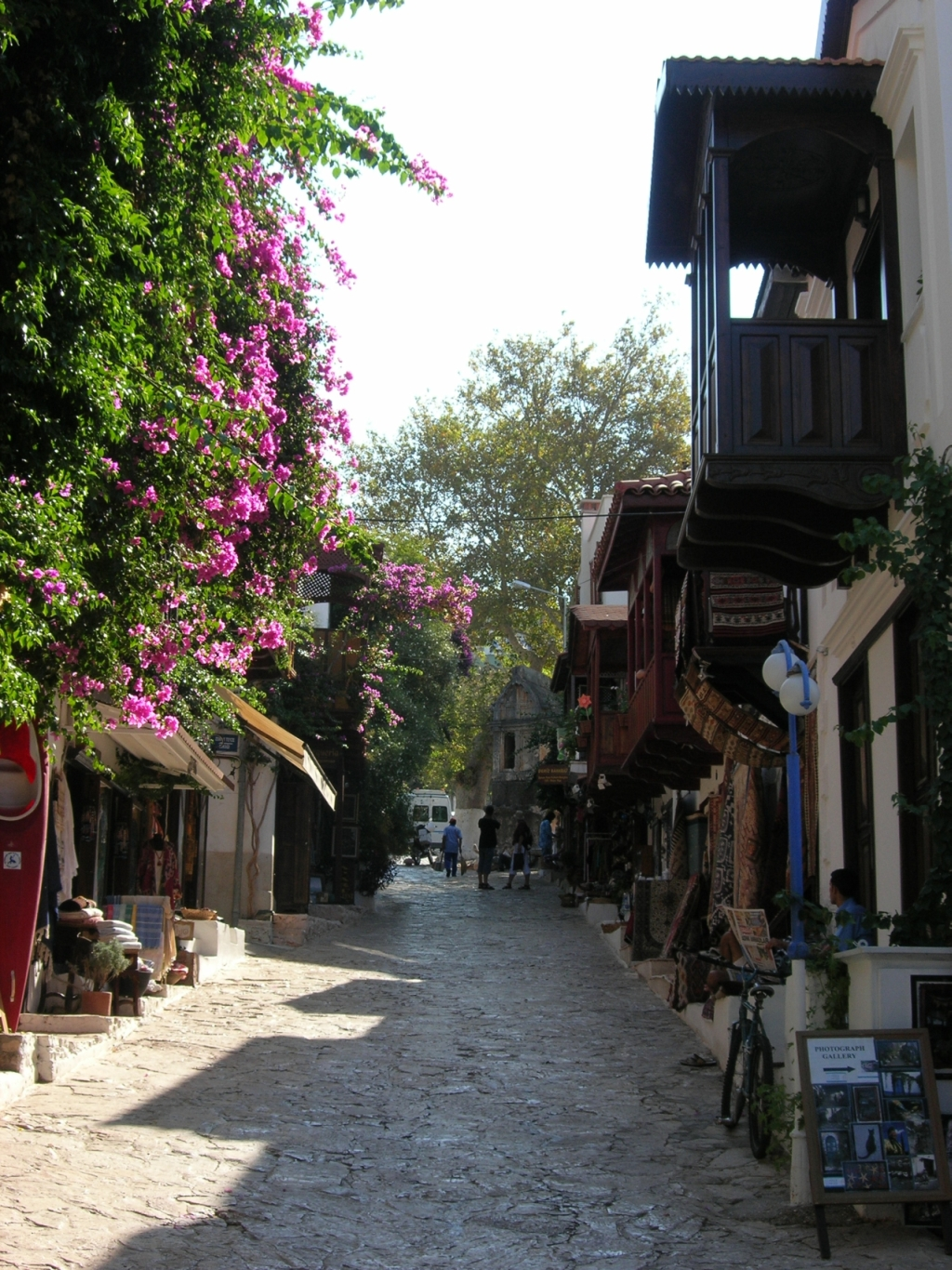
Kaş, Antalya

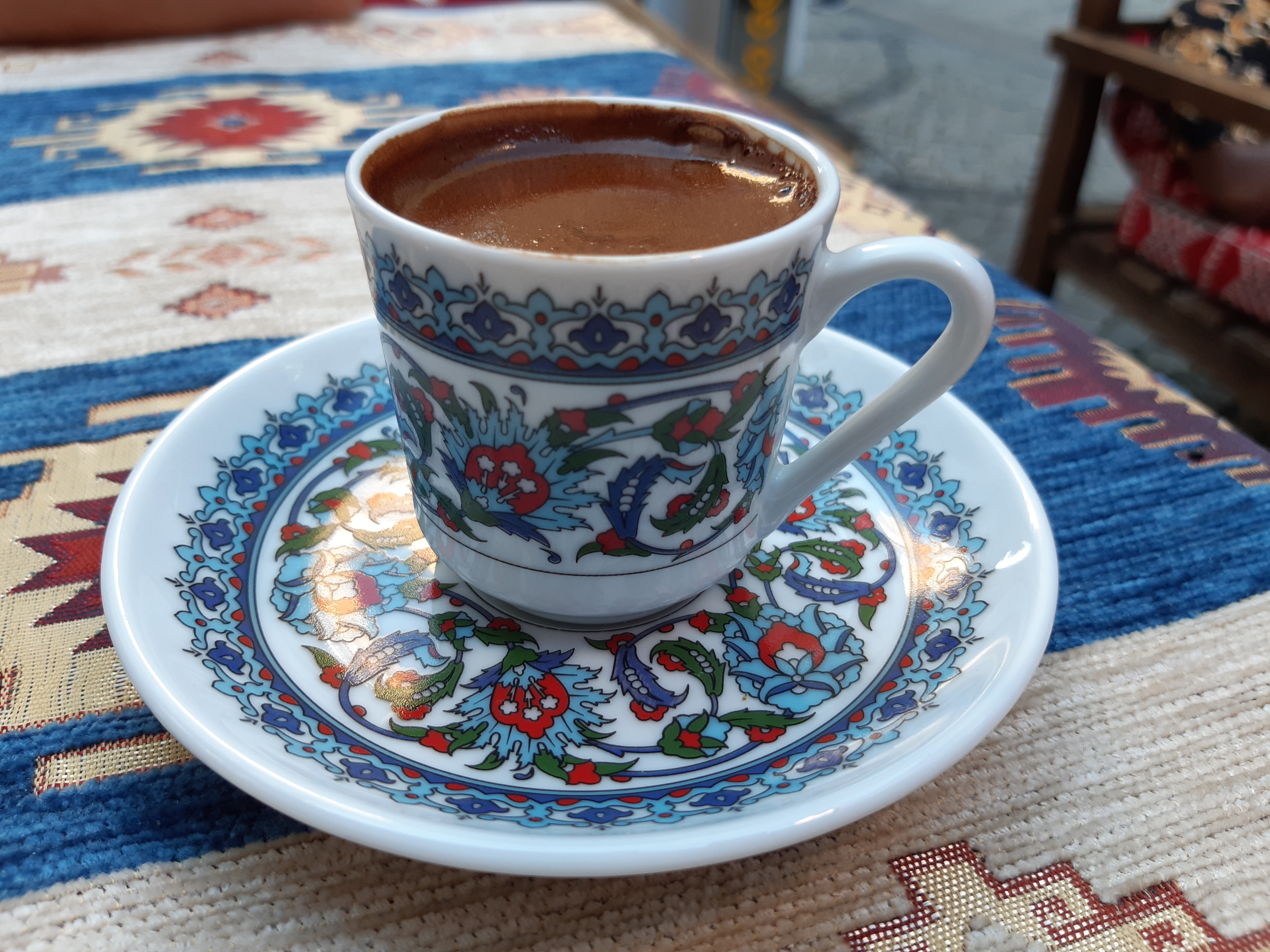
Turkish Coffee is an intangible heritage of Turkey

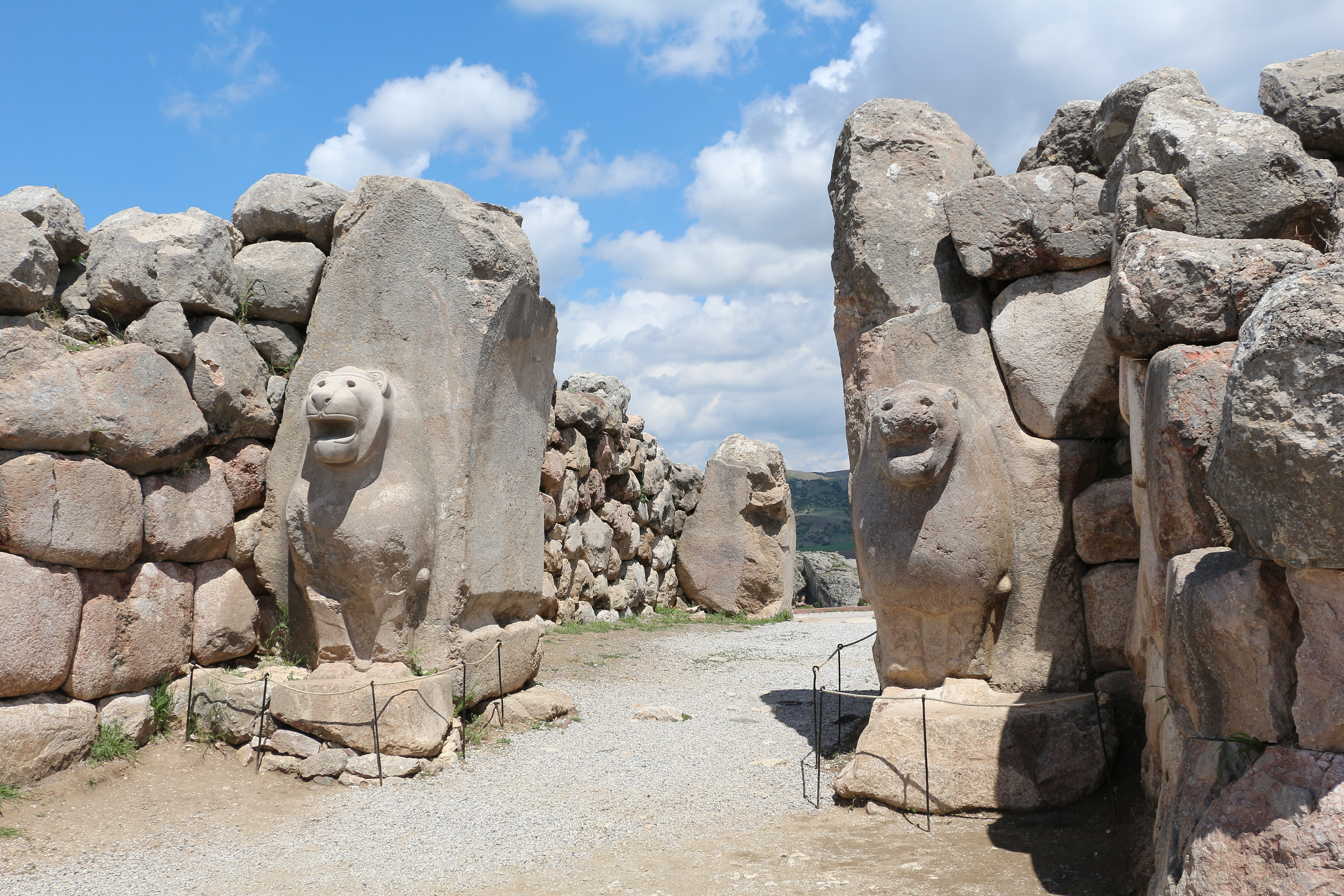
Hattusa, Çorum was a capital city of Hittites Empire

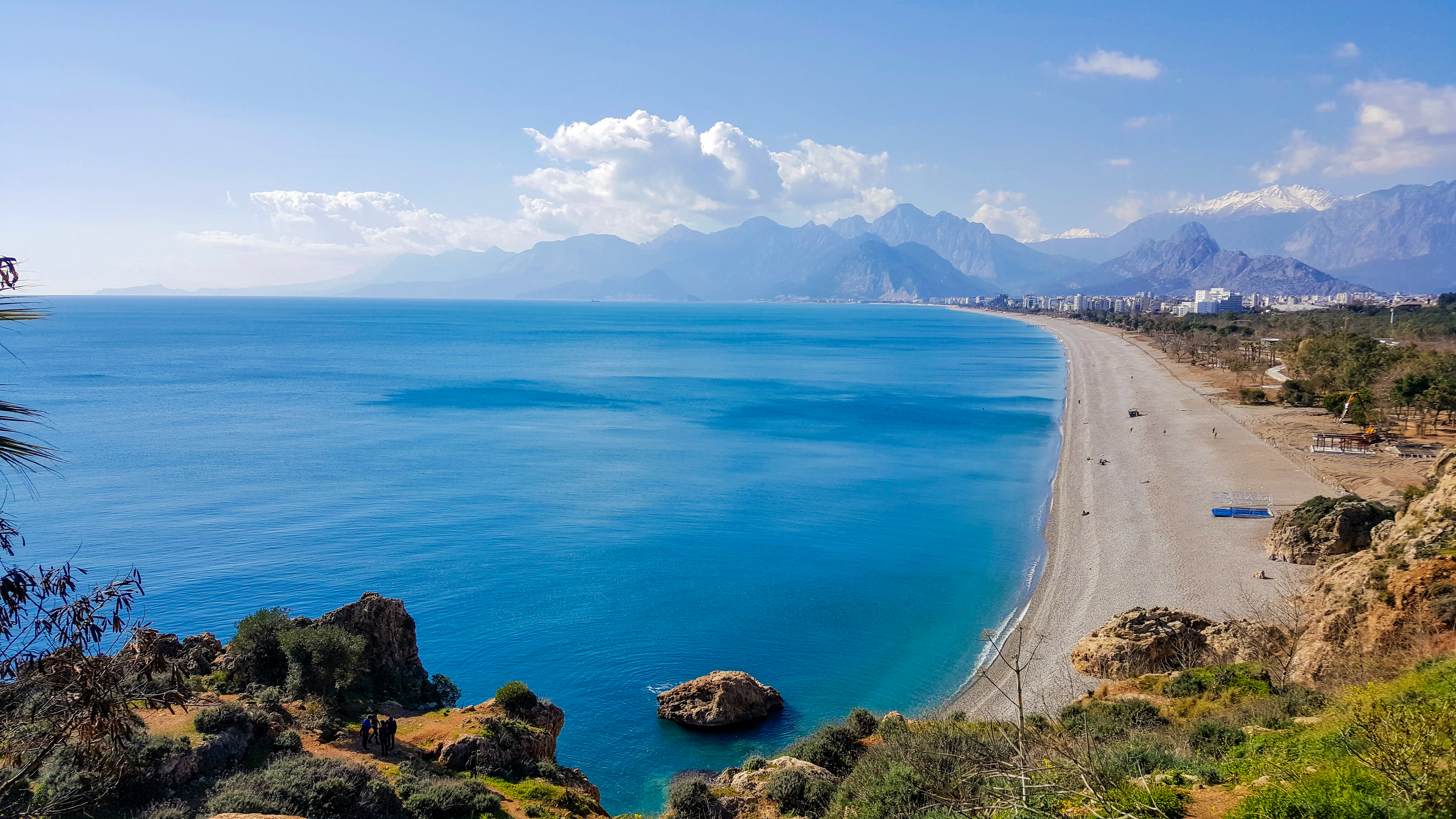
Antalya is famous for turquiose coasts and 232 blue flags

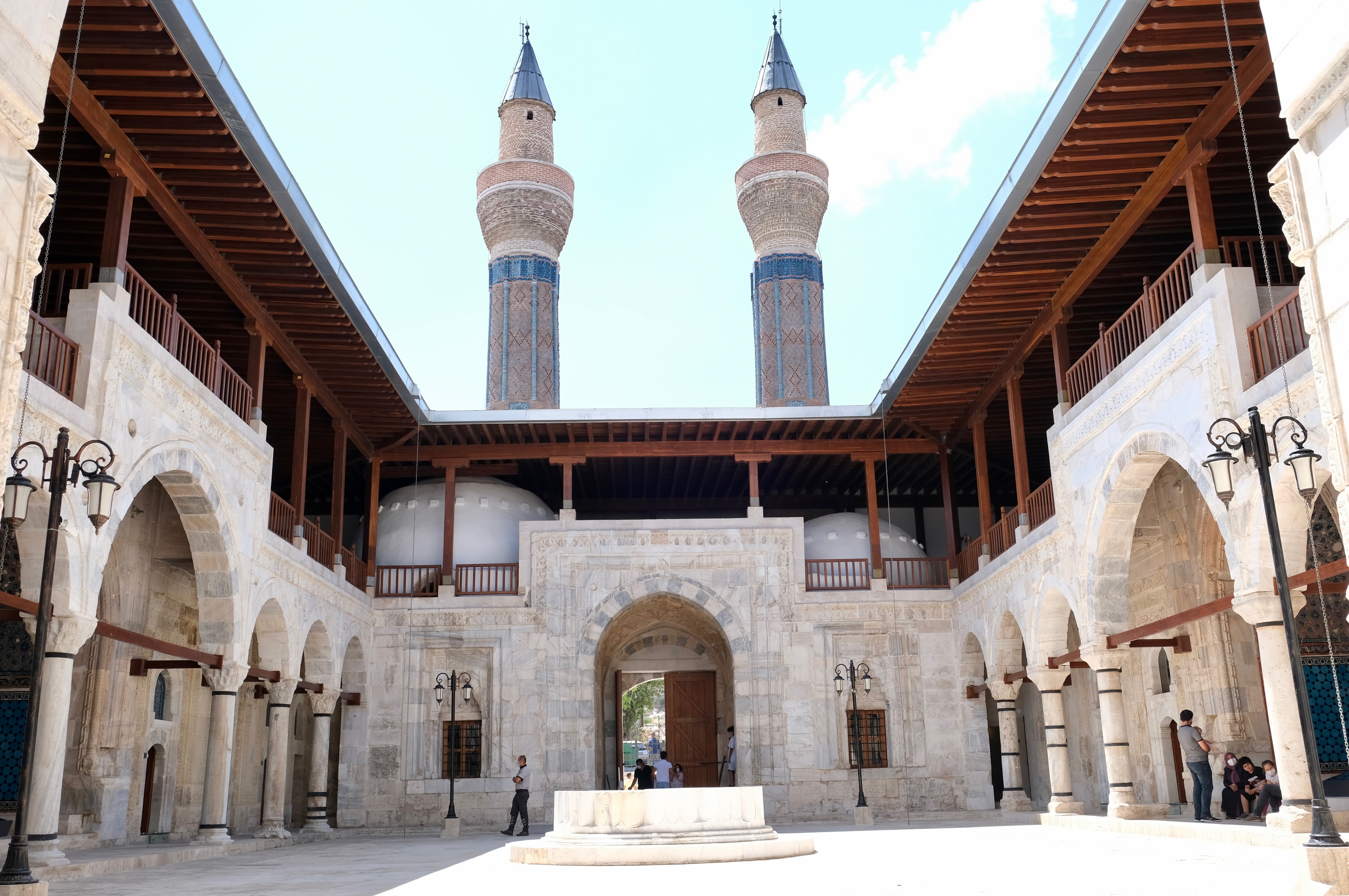
Gök Medrese, Sivas

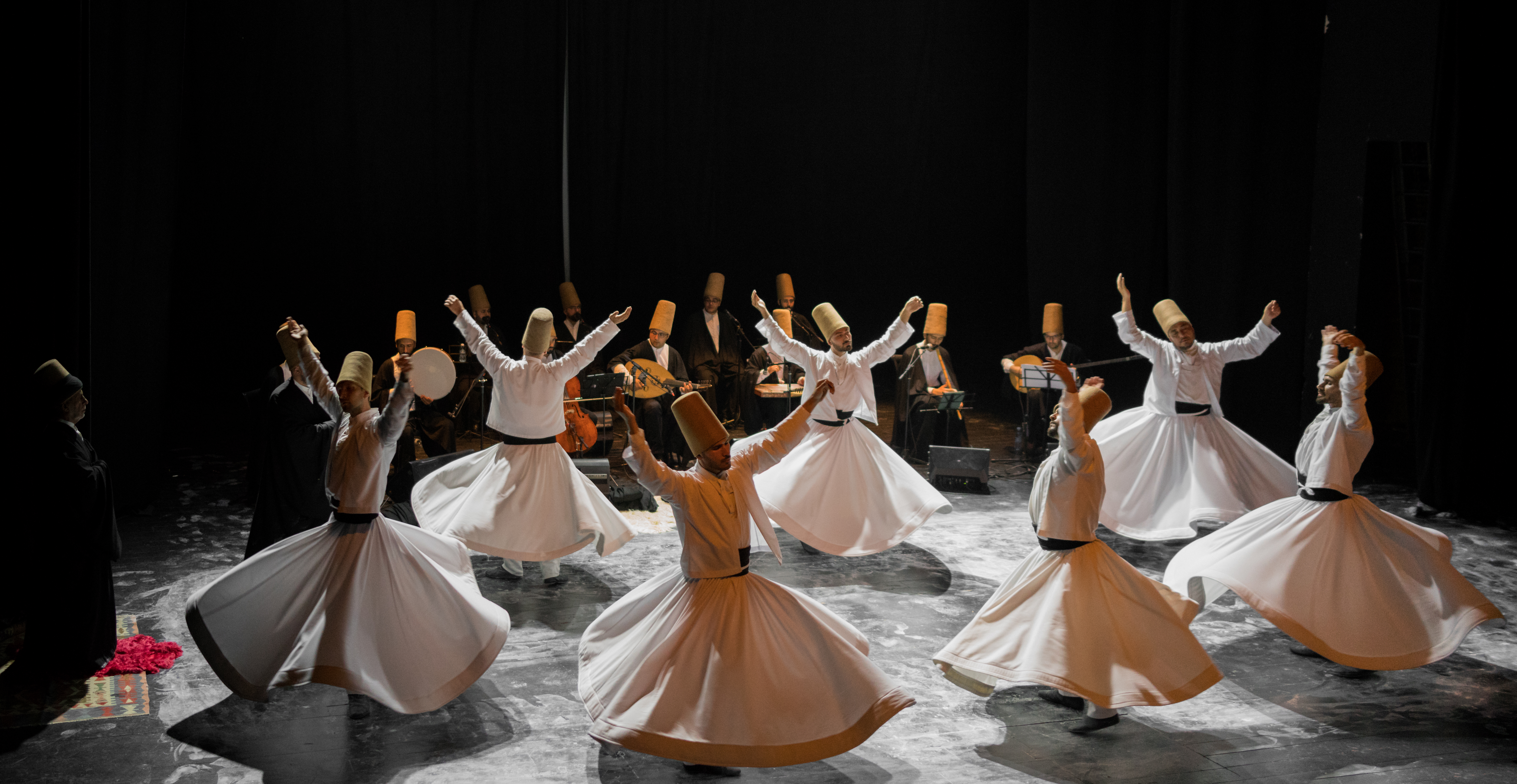
Whirling dervishes of Mevlevi Order, Sufi order from Konya

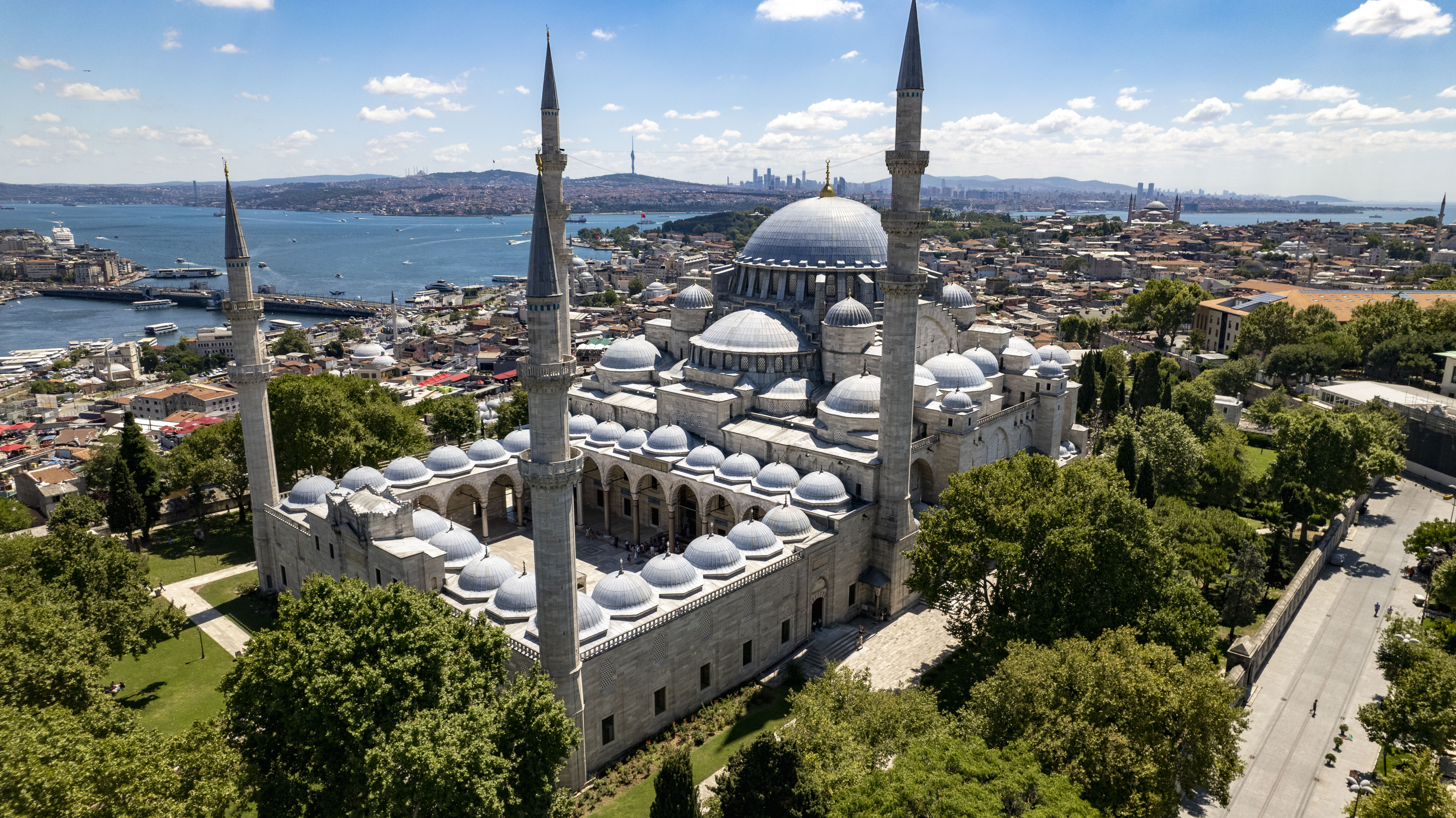
Süleymaniye Mosque, Istanbul

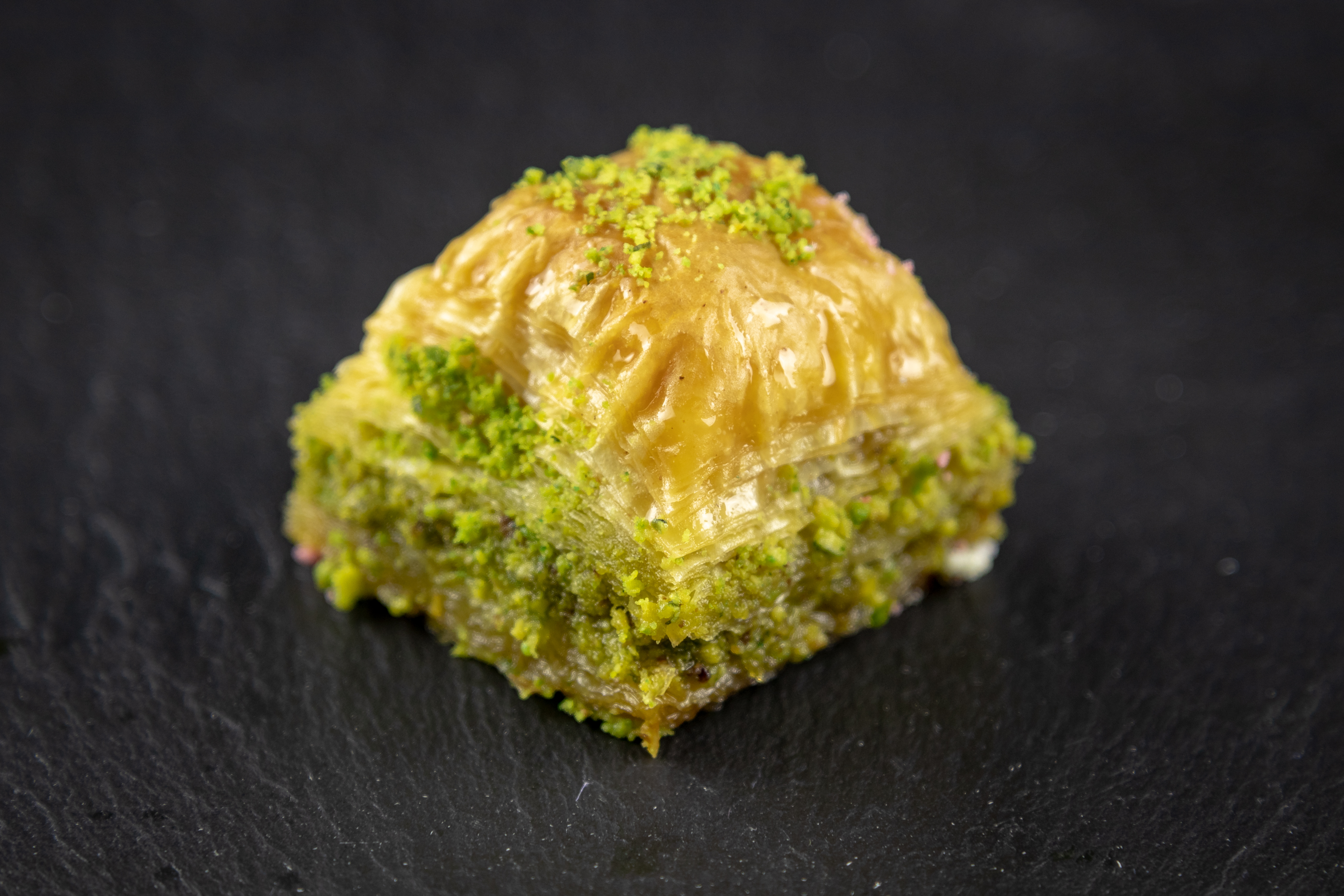
Baklava

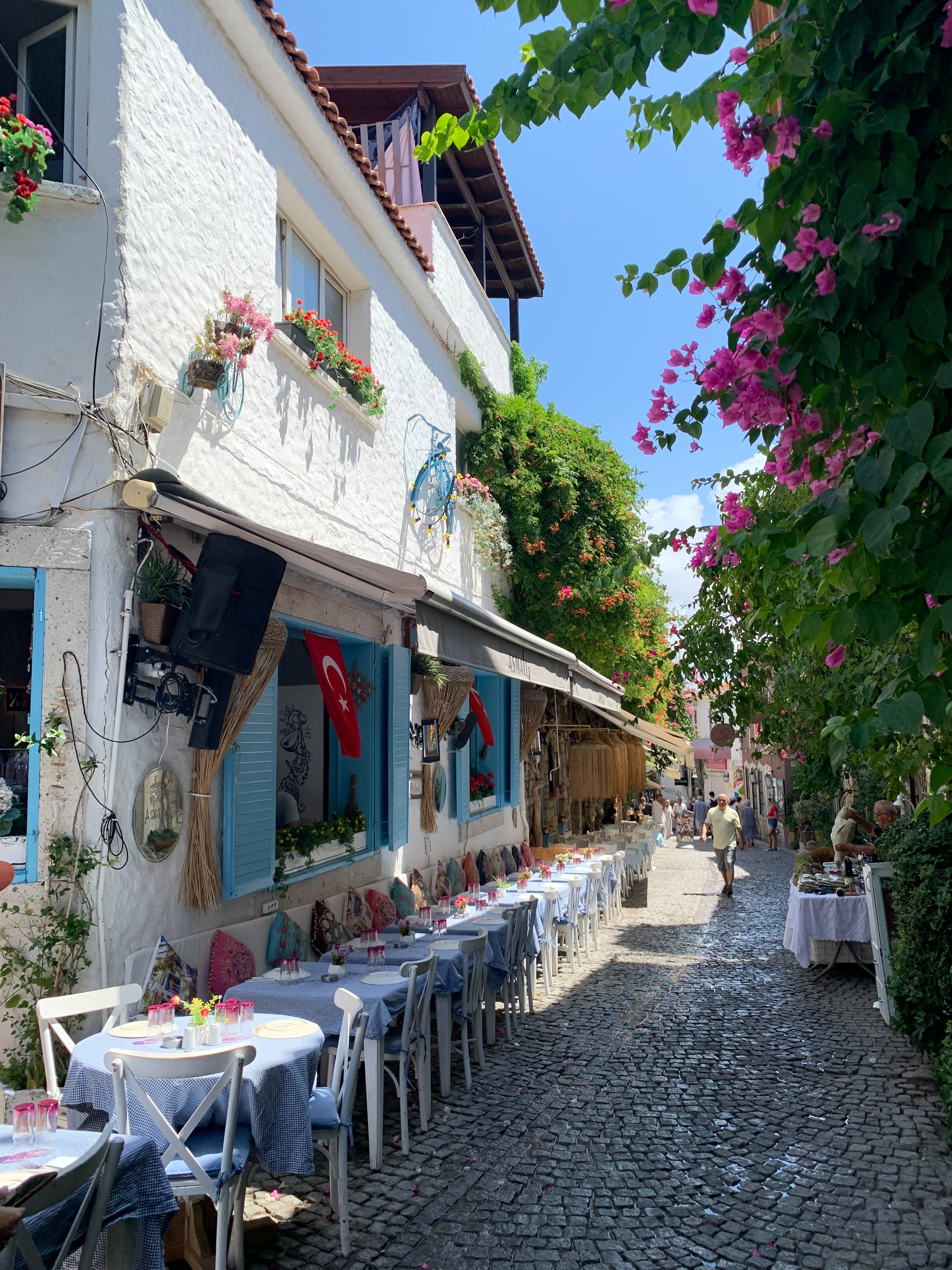
Alaçatı, Izmir

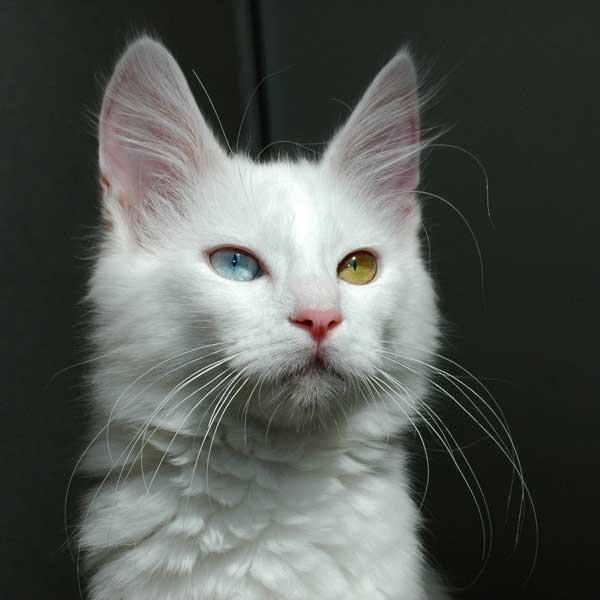
Angora Cat

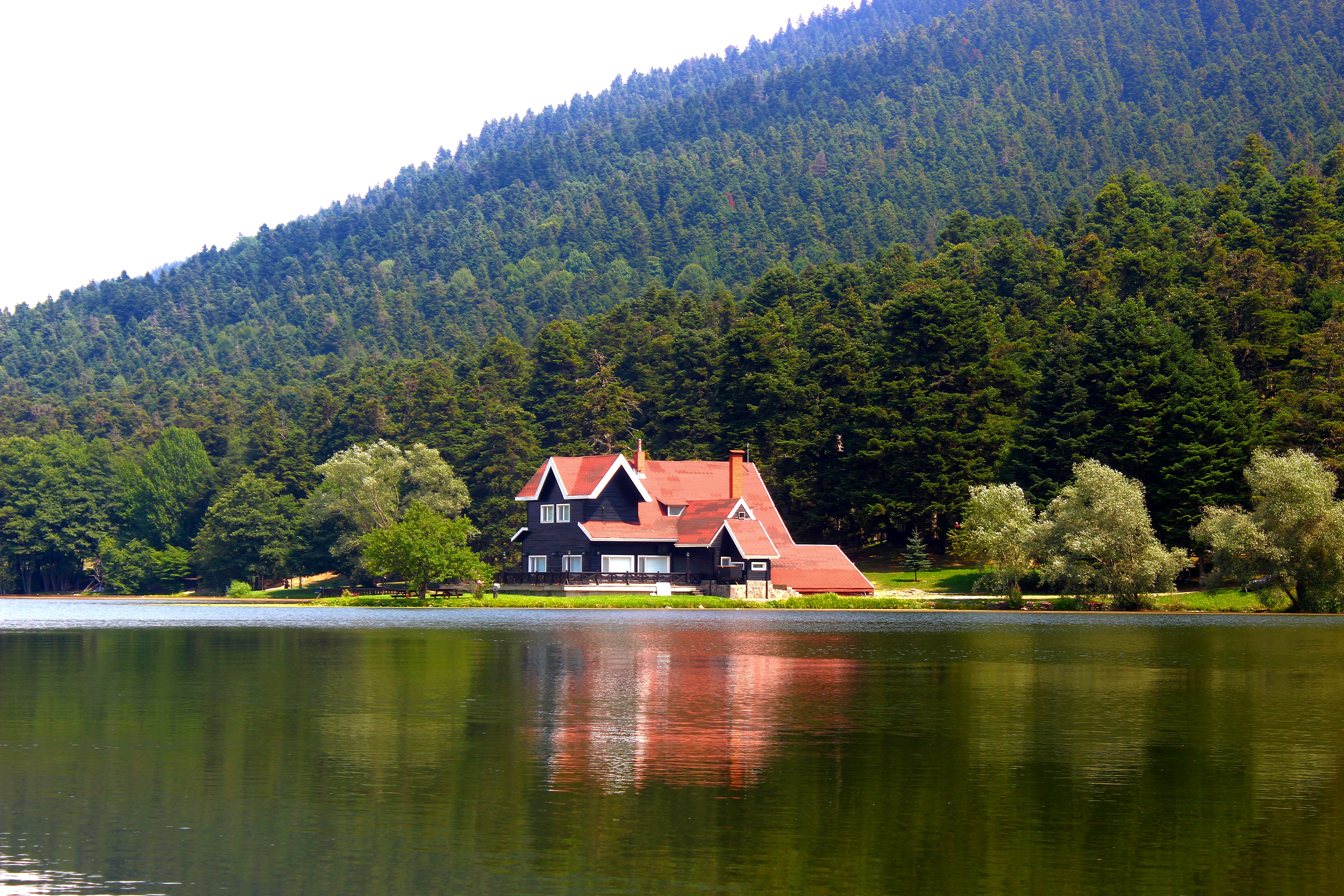
Gölcük, Bolu

== Government policy and regulation ==
Tourism policy and official promotion in Turkey are handled largely through the Ministry of Culture and Tourism and related public bodies. Travel agencies operate under Law No. 1618 on Travel Agencies and the Association of Travel Agencies, which regulates agency establishment, licensing, services, inspection and consumer-related obligations. A travel agency operating licence is issued by the Ministry of Culture and Tourism, while agencies become members of the Association of Turkish Travel Agencies (TÜRSAB).

The Türkiye Tourism Promotion and Development Agency (TGA), established in 2019 as a related entity of the Ministry of Culture and Tourism, carries out national tourism promotion, destination development and communication activities in line with government tourism policy. Turkey has also introduced an Environmental and Cultural Sustainability Program for the tourism industry. Its criteria apply to accommodation facilities and tour operators, and are aligned with Global Sustainable Tourism Council standards.

The AKP government has been promoting "halal tourism" for years, politically reaffirming this stance over the course of 2016. In March 2017, a Turkish court banned global travel fare aggregator website Booking.com from offering services to Turkish tourists for lack of a national licence, while the Hoteliers Association of Turkey campaigns for the lifting of the ban on the enterprise on which its members relied for up to 90 percent of their turnover. In April 2017, the police department of the prime resort city of Antalya issued a directive banning the consumption of alcohol outside of buildings.

== COVID-19 pandemic ==
During the COVID-19 pandemic, the number of tourists arriving in Turkey declined to around 16 million in 2020. This was the lowest number of tourists in the last decade. The revenue from international travel was reduced to $13.7 billion which only made up 1.91% of the total economy in 2020. In 2021, Turkey's tourism recovered from the pandemic as it contributed $59.3 billion to the GDP, which made up 7.3% of the total economy.

== Travel advisories by foreign governments ==
A number of foreign governments warn travelers about risks related to human rights in Turkey. The United States, Germany, Austria, Sweden, the Netherlands, and Belgium warn of arbitrary detention, arrest, prosecution, or exit bans, while France, the United Kingdom, Denmark, Switzerland, Finland, Norway, and Australia also caution that political statements or social-media activity (including "likes") can result in criminal penalties. Germany specifically warns that participation in Kurdish-related demonstrations, petitions, or legally registered associations in Germany can lead to arrest, exit bans, or refusal of entry in Turkey.

The Government of Canada similarly warns that Turkish authorities have detained or prosecuted people for critical political expression, including social-media posts made outside Turkey or years earlier, and advises travelers to "Avoid discussions (including on social media) on historical and religious issues as well as on politics." On 23 November 2024, Canadian journalist Neil Hauer was refused entry to Turkey, told he was on a blacklist and detained for about 16 hours; Turkish authorities did not publicly disclose why he had been blacklisted. Hauer suggested that the ban may have resulted either from his critical reporting on Azerbaijan and Nagorno-Karabakh or from his posts about the Armenian genocide.

== See also ==
- List of archaeological sites by country § Turkey
- Ministry of Culture and Tourism (Turkey)
- Museums in Turkey
- Visa policy of Turkey
- List of national parks of Turkey
