= Antalya =

City in Turkey

- Metropolitan municipality
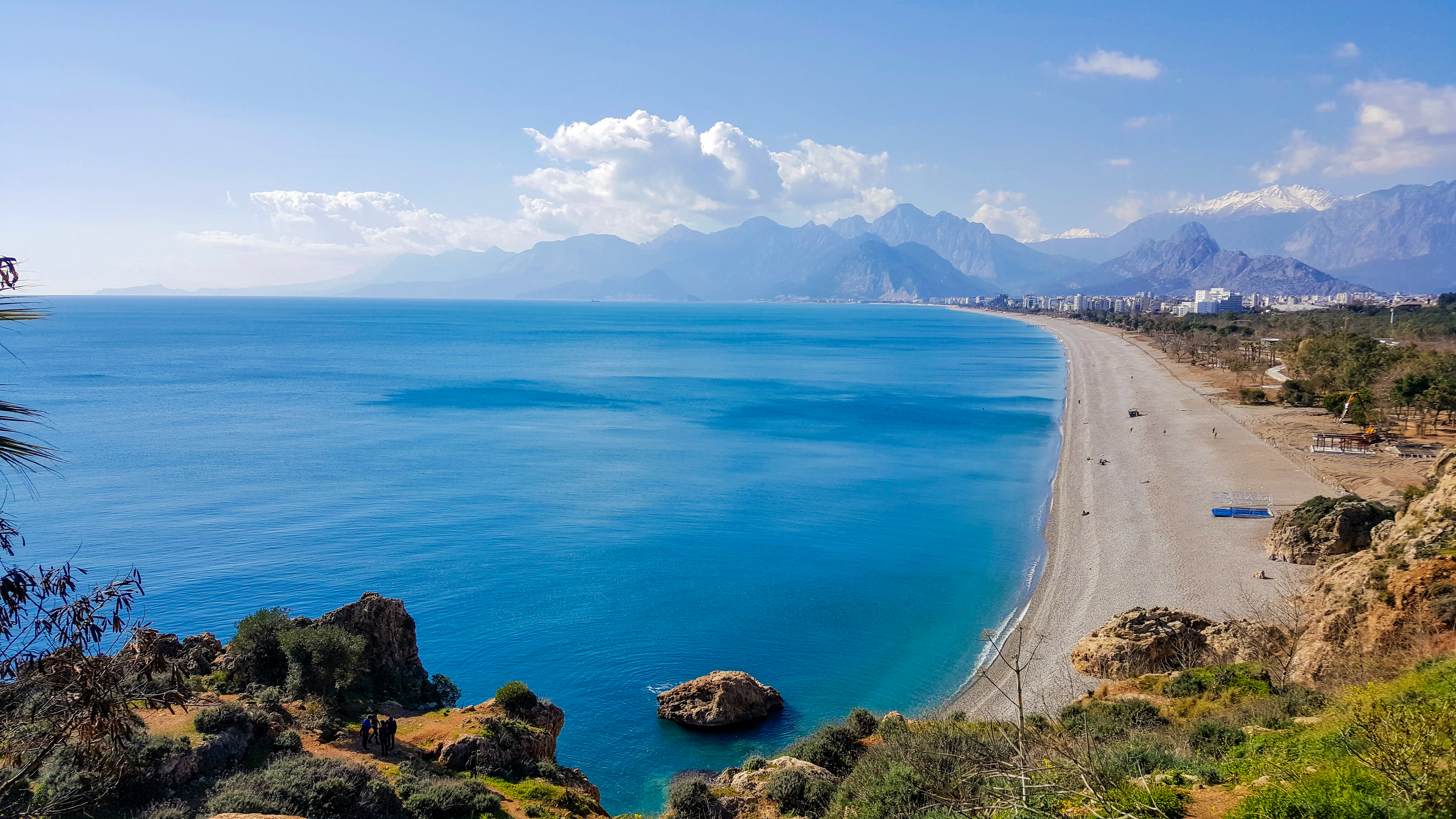
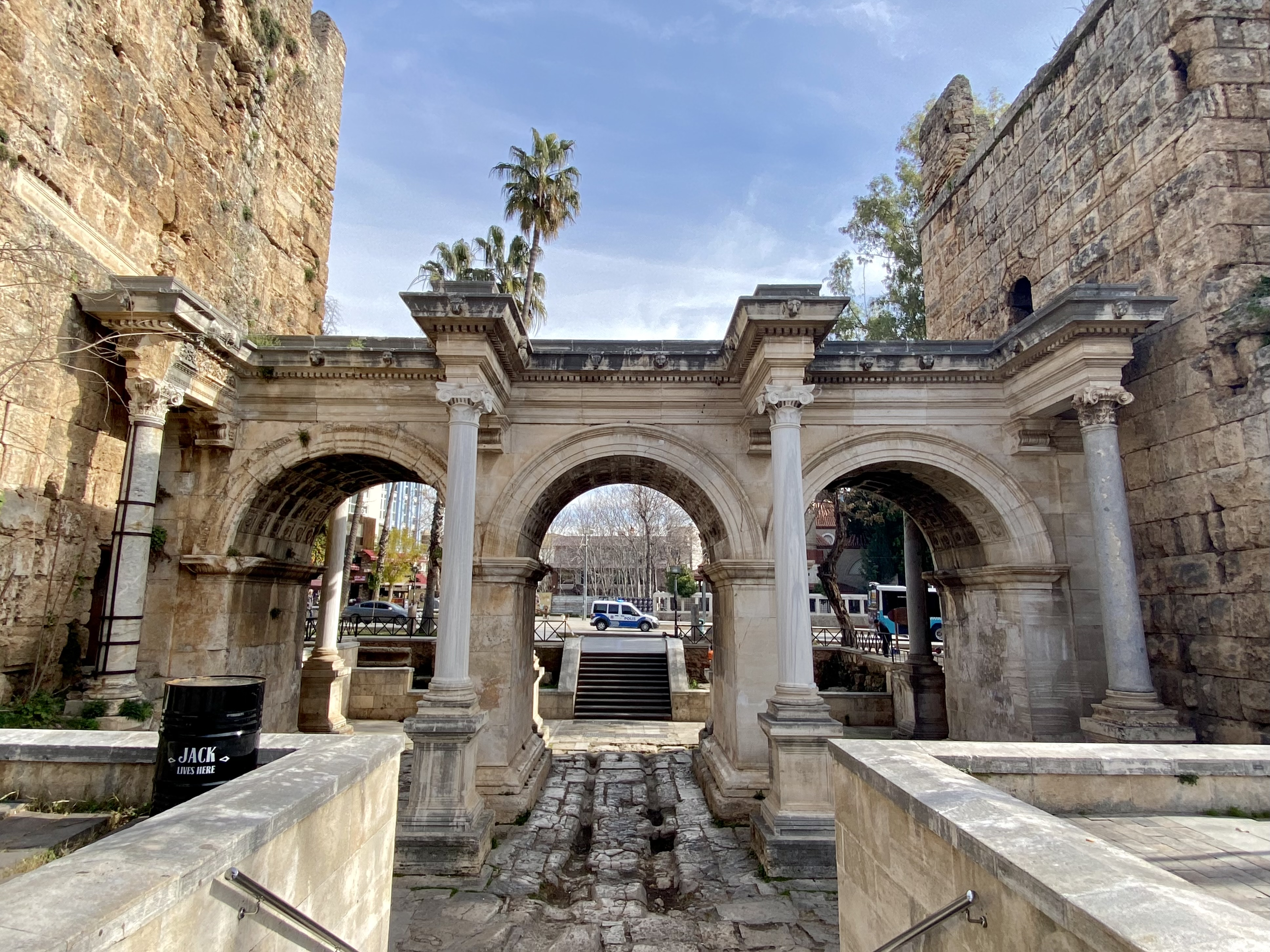
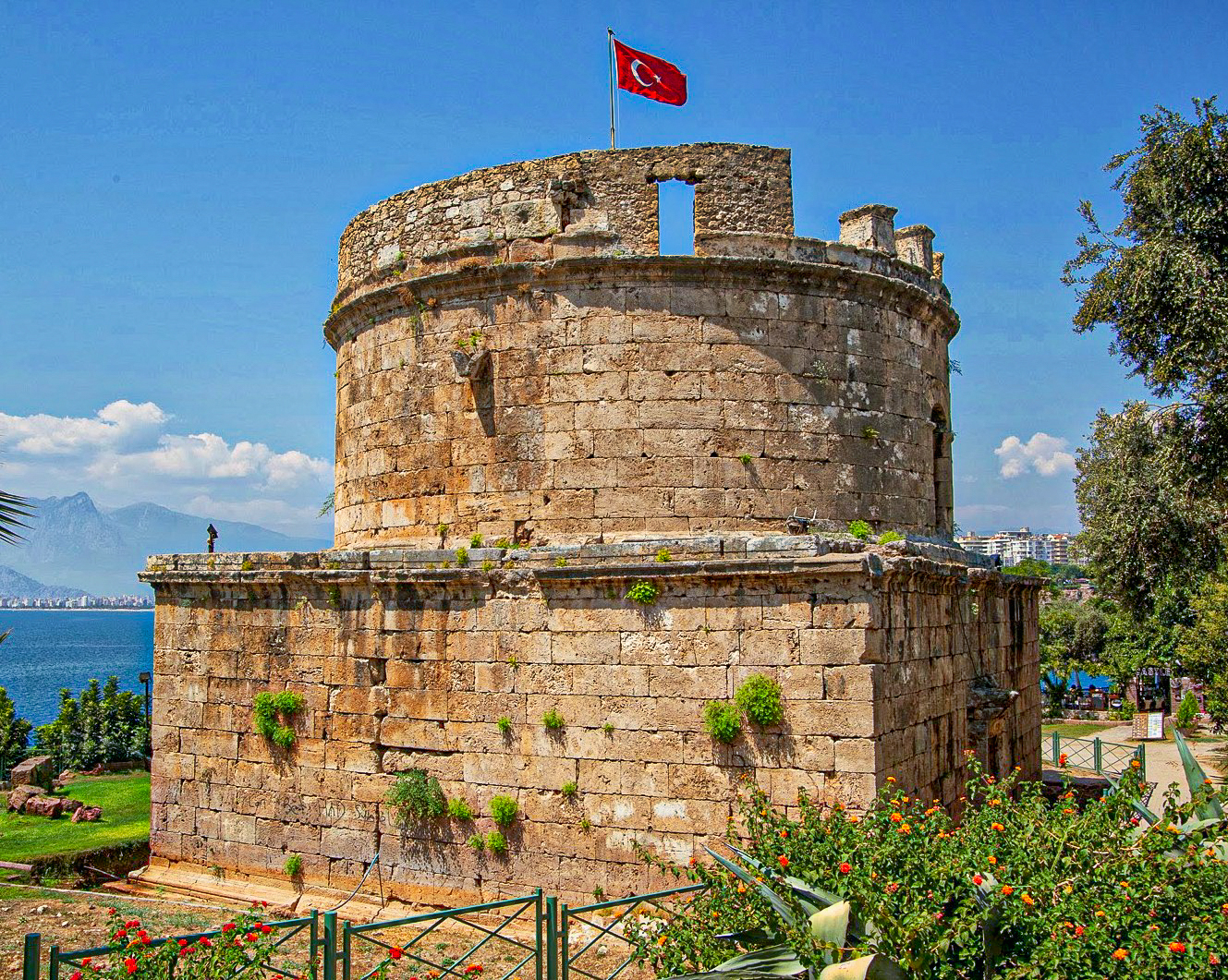
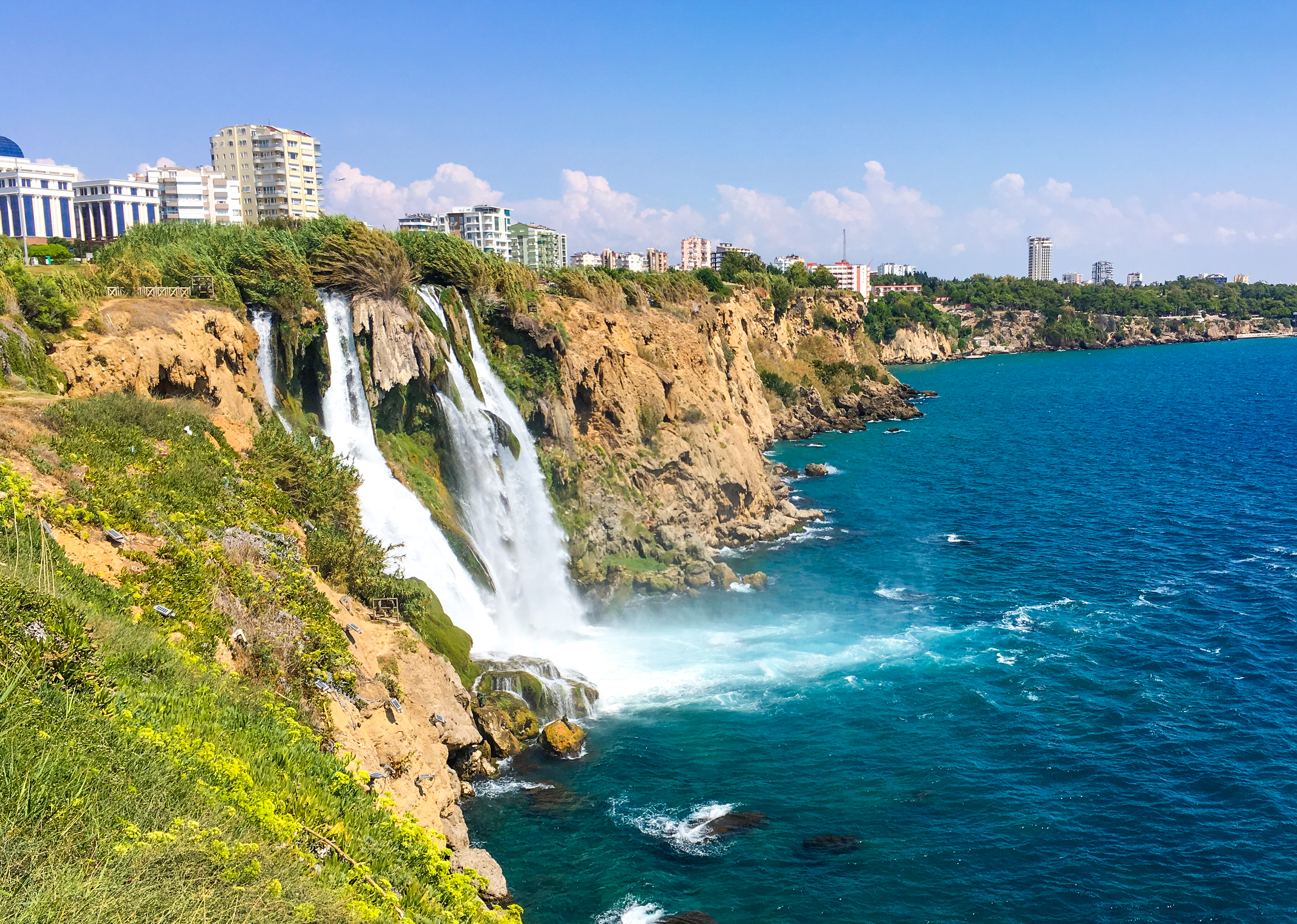
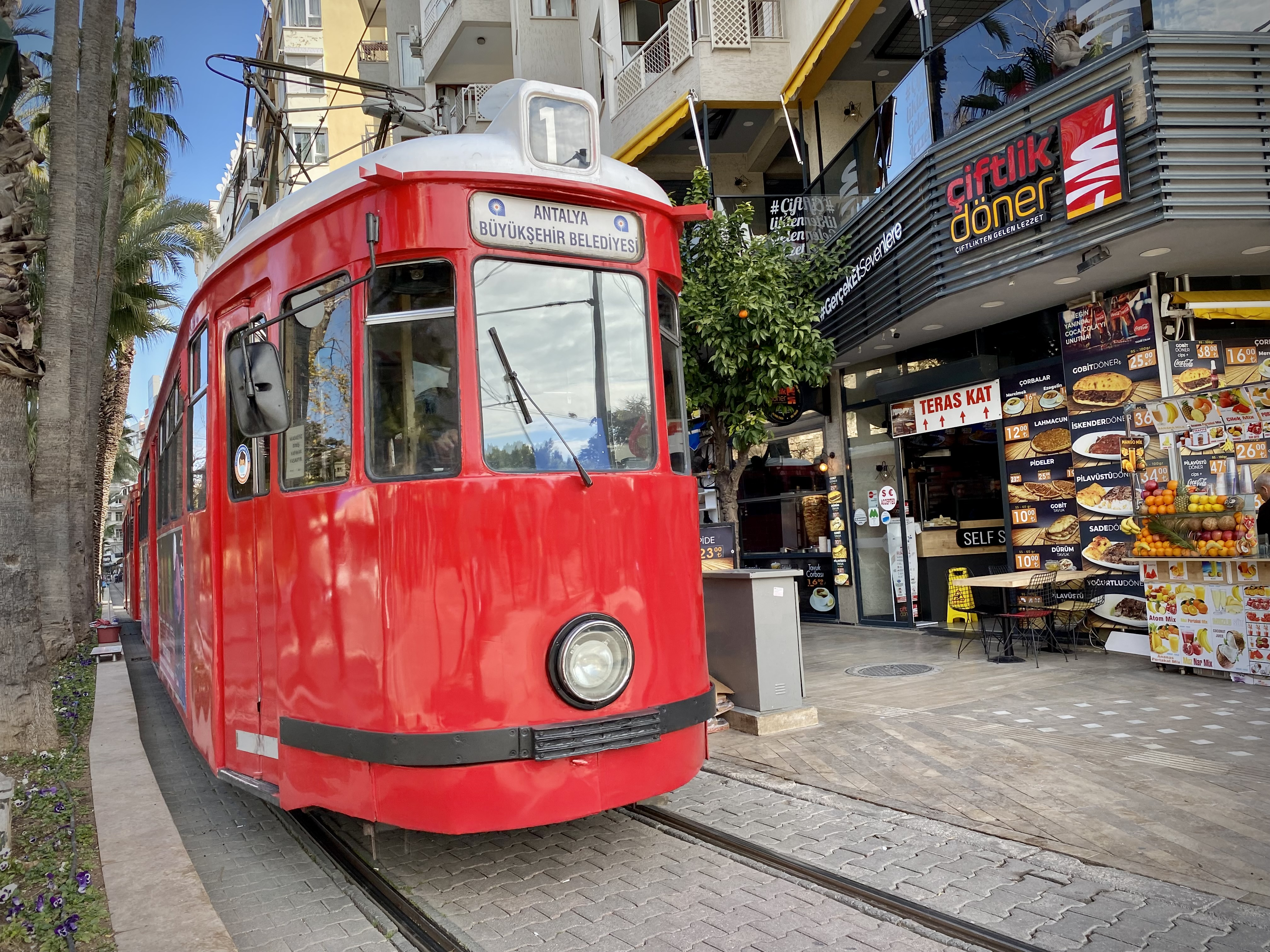
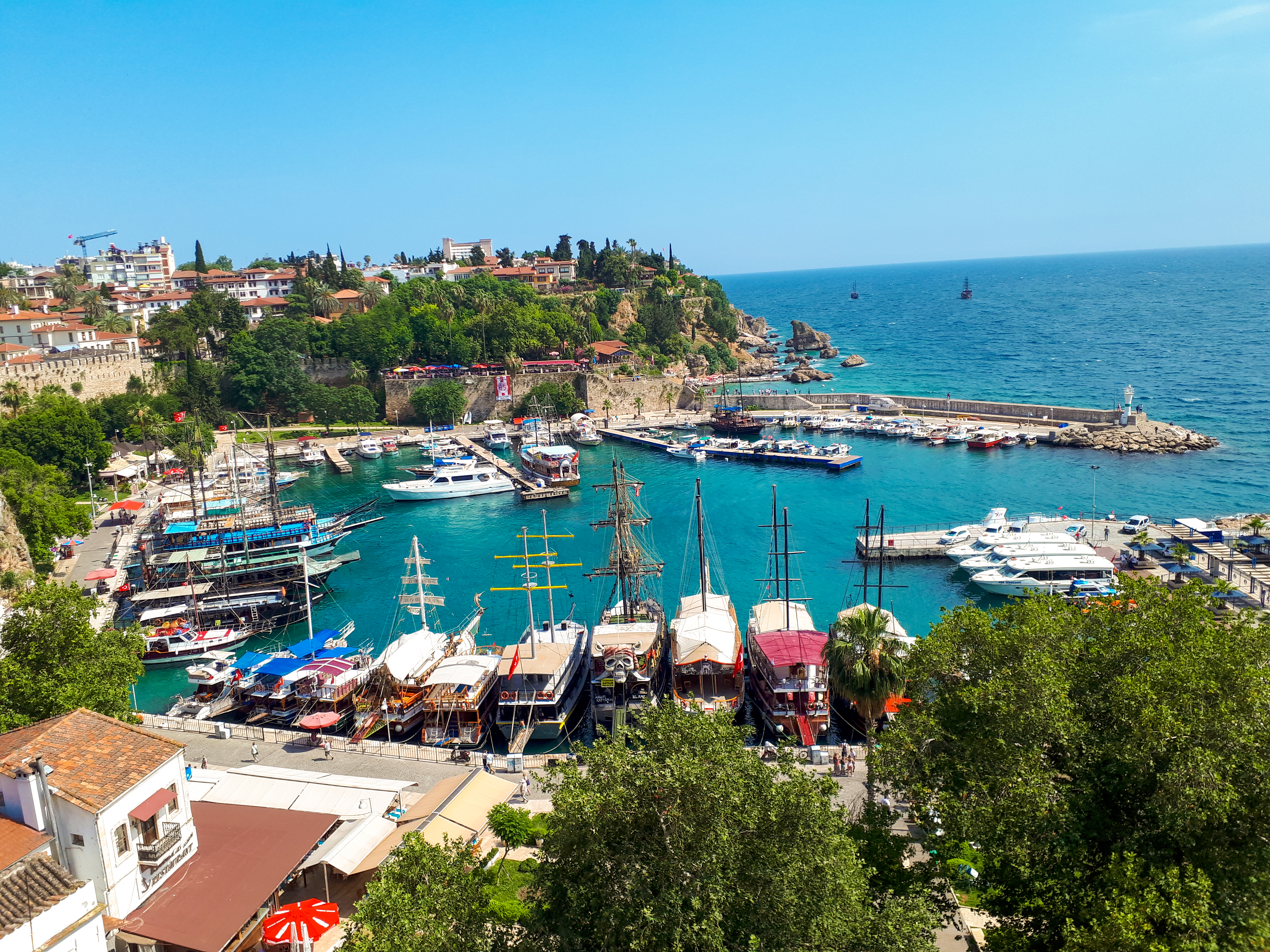
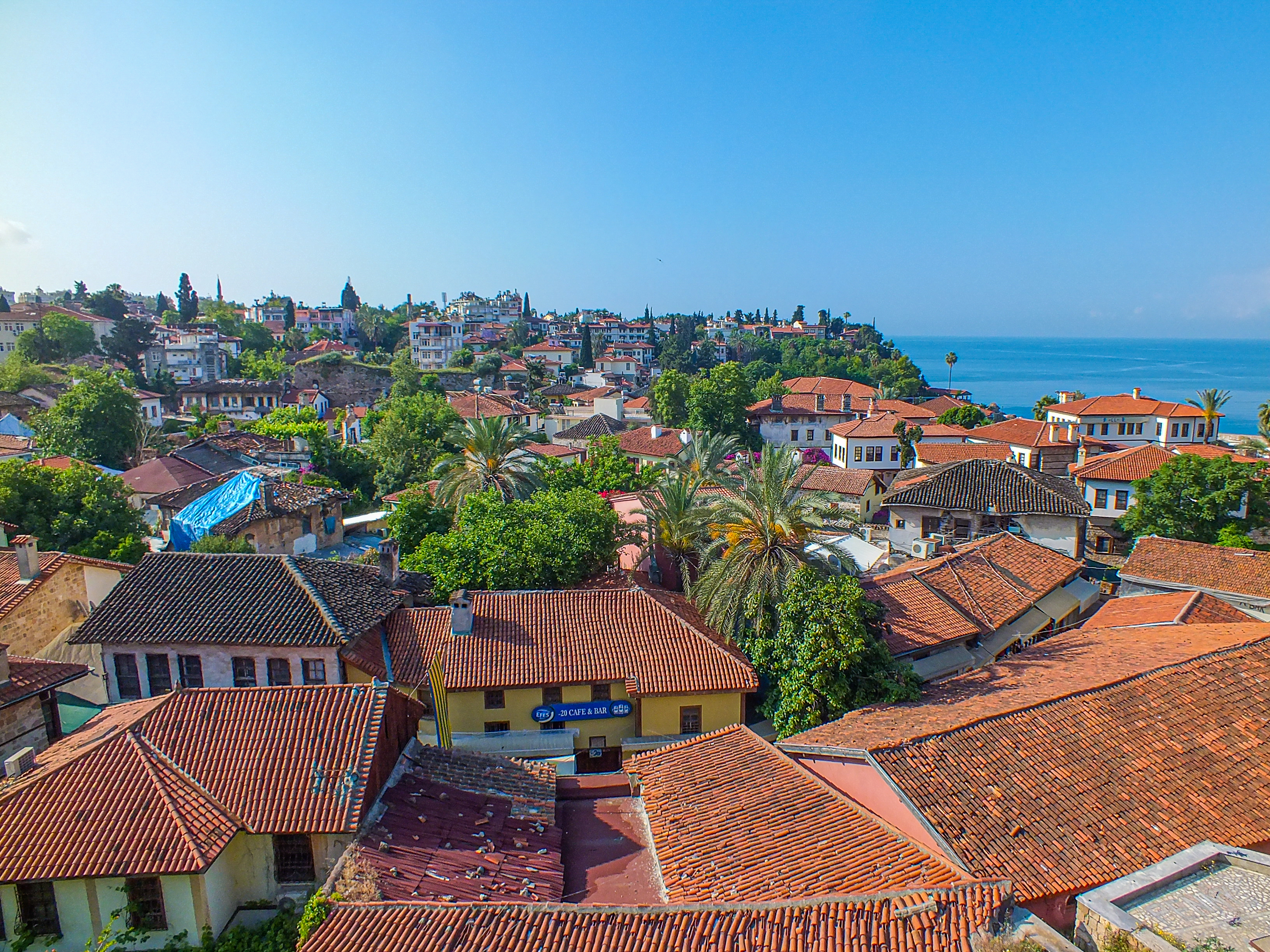
- Konyaaltı Beach Hadrian's Gate Hıdırlık Tower Düden Waterfalls Antalya Tram Antalya Harbour Kaleiçi

- Seal of Antalya Metropolitan Municipality
- Nickname: Capital of Tourism (Turkish: Turizmin Başkenti)
- Location of Antalya Antalya (Mediterranean) Antalya (Europe)
- Coordinates: 36°53′13″N 30°42′12″E
- Country: Turkey
- Region: Mediterranean
- Province: Antalya

Government
  - Type: Metropolitan municipality
  - Mayor: Büşra Özdemir (AKP)

Area
  - Metropolitan municipality: 20,591 km^{2} (7,950 sq mi)
  - Urban: 1,417 km^{2} (547 sq mi)
- Elevation: 30 m (98 ft)

Population (2024)
  - Metropolitan municipality: 2,722,103
  - Urban: 1,335,002
  - Metro density: 122/km^{2} (320/sq mi)
- Demonym: Antalyalı

GDP (nominal, 2024)
  - Metropolitan municipality: ₺1.524 trillion (US$46.482 billion)
  - Per capita: ₺561,429 (US$17,124)
- Time zone: UTC+3 (TRT)
- Postal code: 07010 to 07320
- Area code: (+90) 242
- Vehicle registration: 07
- Website: www.antalya.bel.tr www.antalya.gov.tr

Antalya (Note: English pronunciation: UK: /ænˈtæljə/ an-TAL-yə, US: /ˌɑːntəlˈjɑː, ˌæn-/ A(H)N-təl-YAH; Turkish pronunciation: [anˈtalja].) is one of the largest cities in Turkey and the capital of Antalya Province, the fifth-most populous province. Recognized as the "capital of tourism" in Turkey and a pivotal part of the Turkish Riviera, Antalya sits on Anatolia's southwest coast, flanked by the Taurus Mountains. The urban (Note: Namely the districts of Konyaalti, Kepez, Muratpasa, Döşemealtı, and Aksu.) population of the city is around 1.5 million, with a provincial population of 2,722,103.

The city was formerly known as Attaleia, founded around 200 BC by King Attalus II of Pergamon. Attaleia was soon conquered by the Romans. Roman rule saw the city thrive, including the construction of several new monuments, such as Hadrian's Gate, and the flourishing of nearby ancient cities such as Patara, Xanthos and Myra in the Lycia region; Perga, Aspendos and Side in Pamphylia; and Sagalassos, Antioch and Termessos in Pisidia. These cities were already significant centers before Roman influence. Antalya has changed hands in history several times, including the Seljuk Empire in 1207 and the Ottoman Empire in 1391. Ottoman rule brought relative peace and stability for the next five hundred years. The city was occupied by Italy for three years in the aftermath of World War I, but was returned to Turkey during the Turkish War of Independence.

While the city itself only has modest elevation changes, Antalya has high mountains in all directions to its interior. With moisture being trapped, the local climate thus has high winter rainfall, while the interior bay setting results in very hot summers for a coastal city.

The city is Turkey's biggest international sea resort on the Turkish Riviera. Large-scale development and governmental funding has made it a prime destination for tourists. In 2023, Euromonitor International ranked Antalya as the fourth-most visited city in the world, attracting more than 16.5 million foreign visitors in that year. In 2025, the number of visitors had gone up to 18.6 million, though it had fallen to the eighth-most visited city.

== Etymology ==
The city was founded as "Attaleia" (Ancient Greek: Ἀττάλεια), named after its founder Attalos II, king of Pergamon. This name, still in use in Greek, was later evolved in Turkish as Adalia and then Antalya.

Attaleia was also the name of a festival at Delphi and Attalis (Greek: Ἀτταλίς) was the name of an old Greek tribe at Athens. Despite the close similarity, there is no connection with the name Anatolia.

== History ==
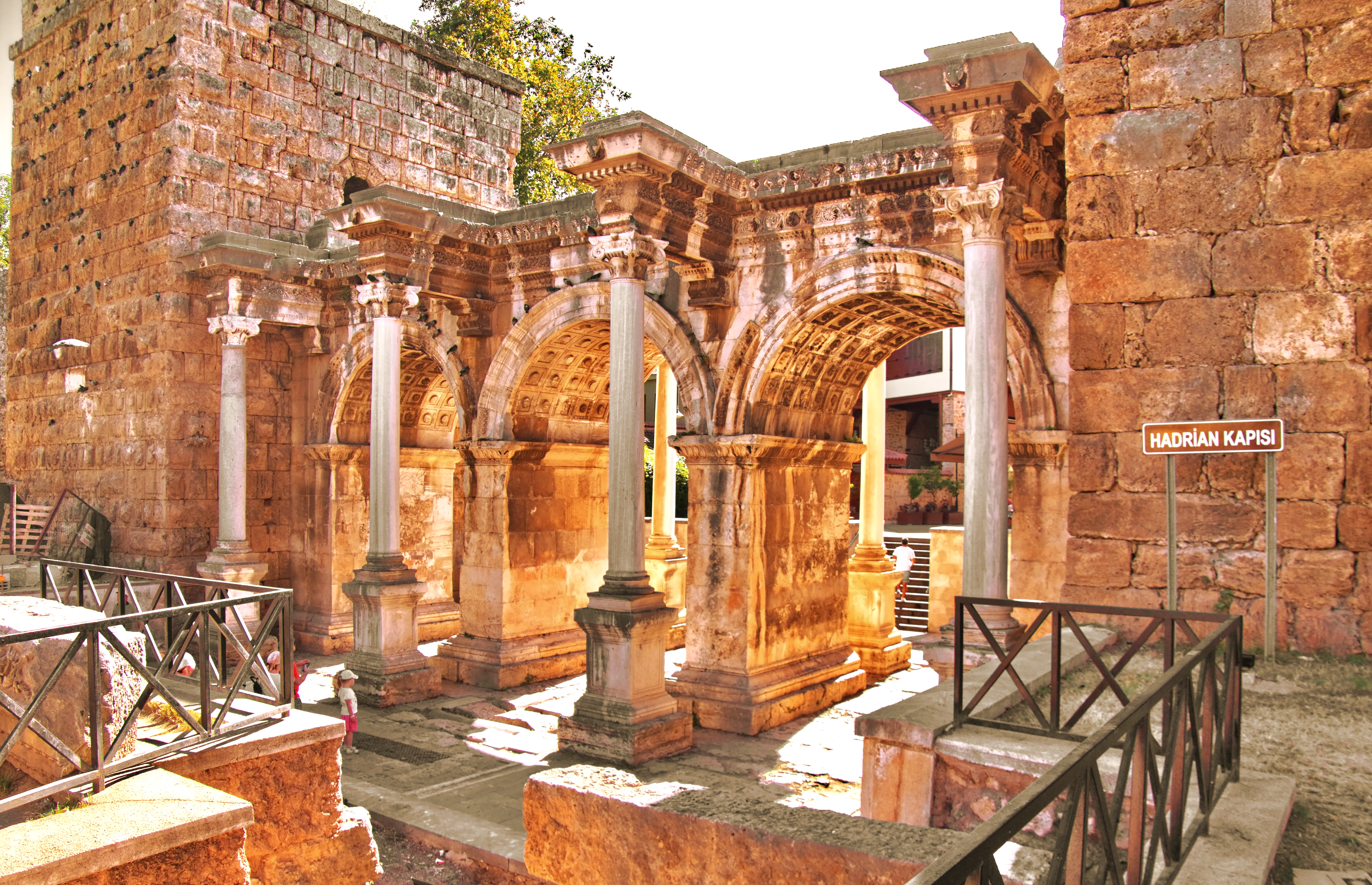
Hadrian's Gate, built in the honor of the Roman emperor Hadrian, who visited Attaleia in 130 CE

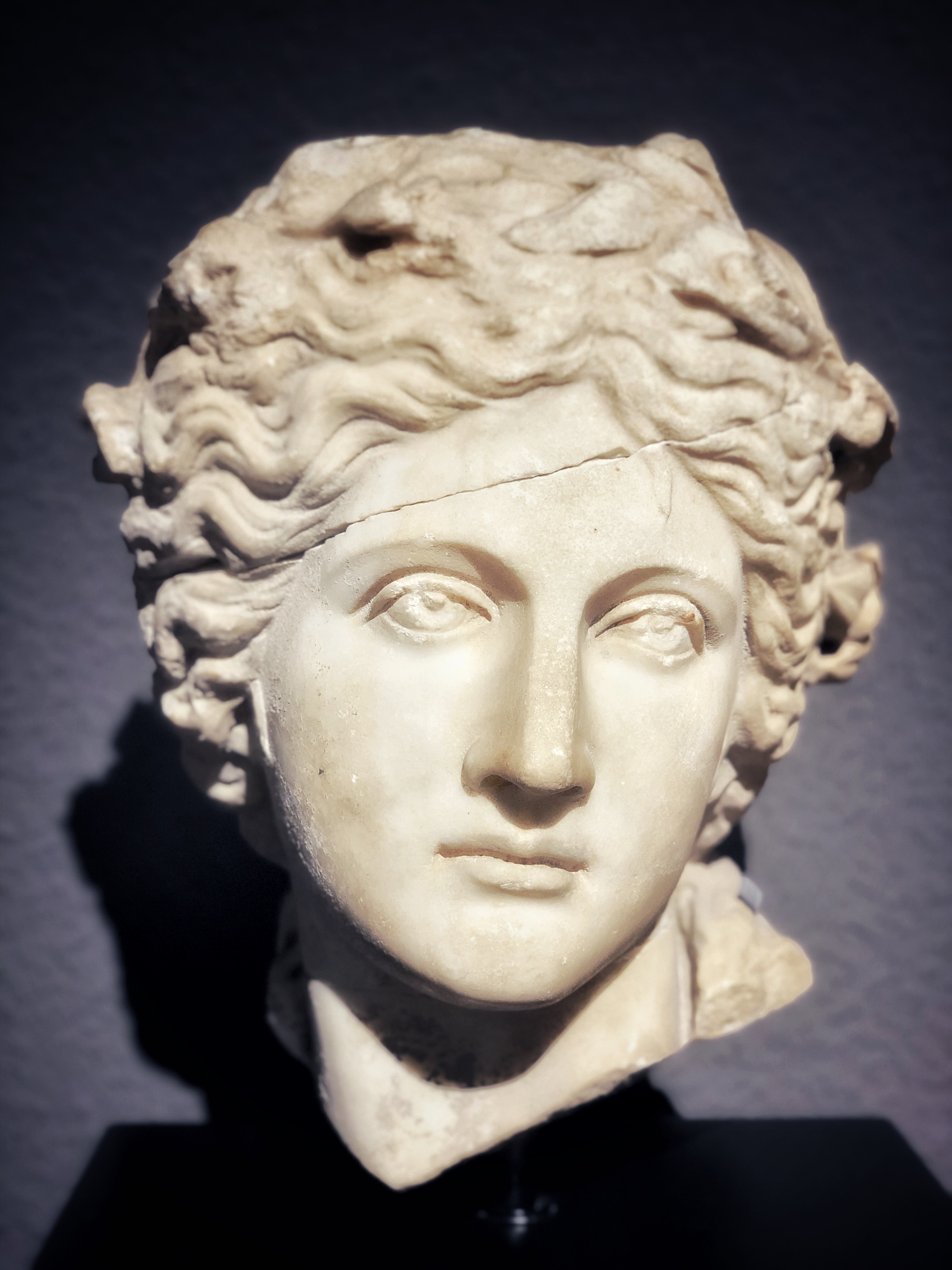
Statue of Apollo's head in the Antalya Museum

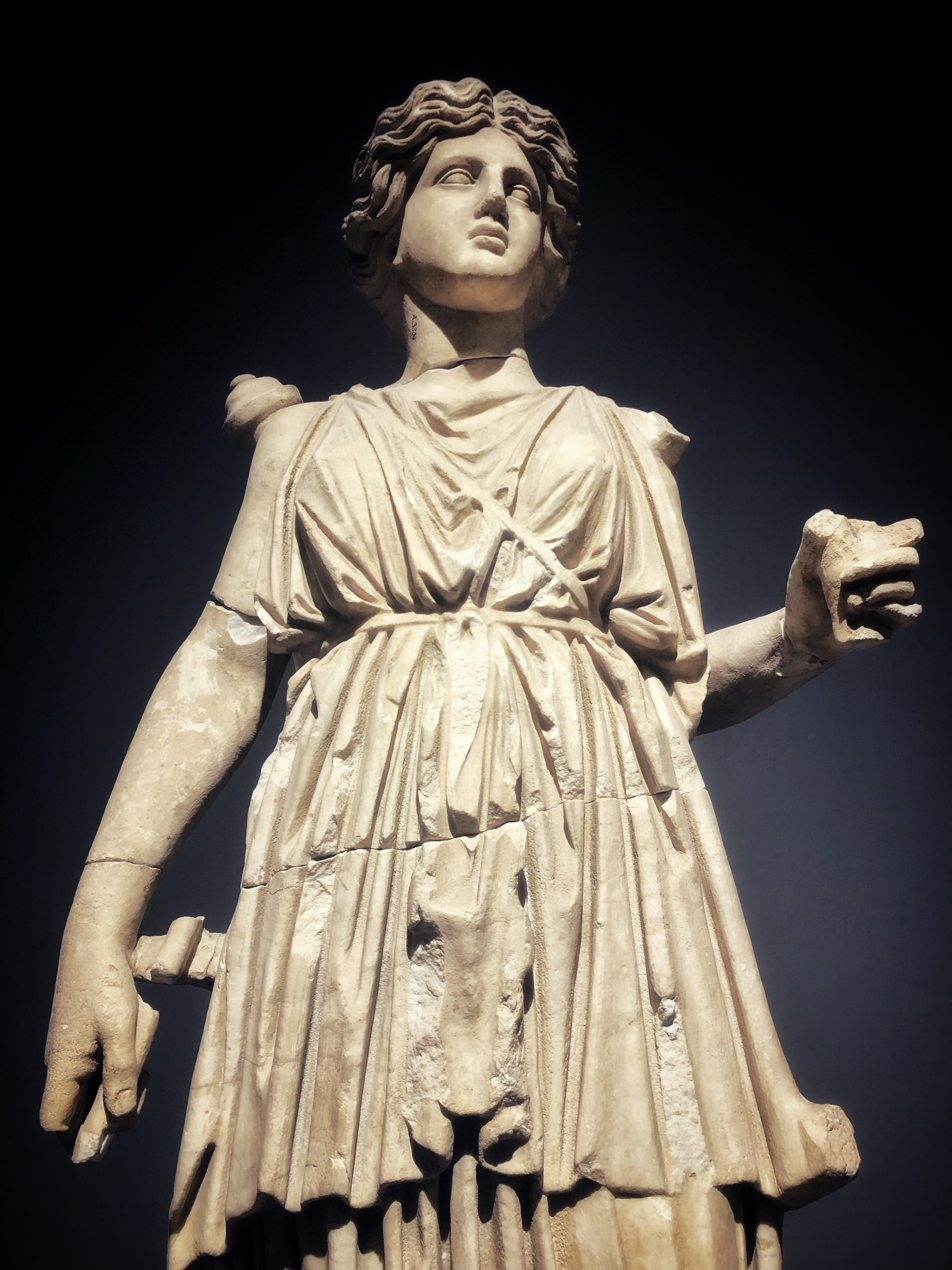
Statue of Artemis in the Antalya Museum

King Attalus II of Pergamon is looked on as founder of the city in about 150 BC, during the Hellenistic period. It was named Attaleia or Attalia (Ancient Greek: Ἀττάλεια) in his honour. The city served as a naval base for Attalus's powerful fleet. Excavations in 2008, in the Doğu Garajı plot, uncovered remains dating to the 3rd century BC, suggesting that Attaleia was a rebuilding and expansion of an earlier town.

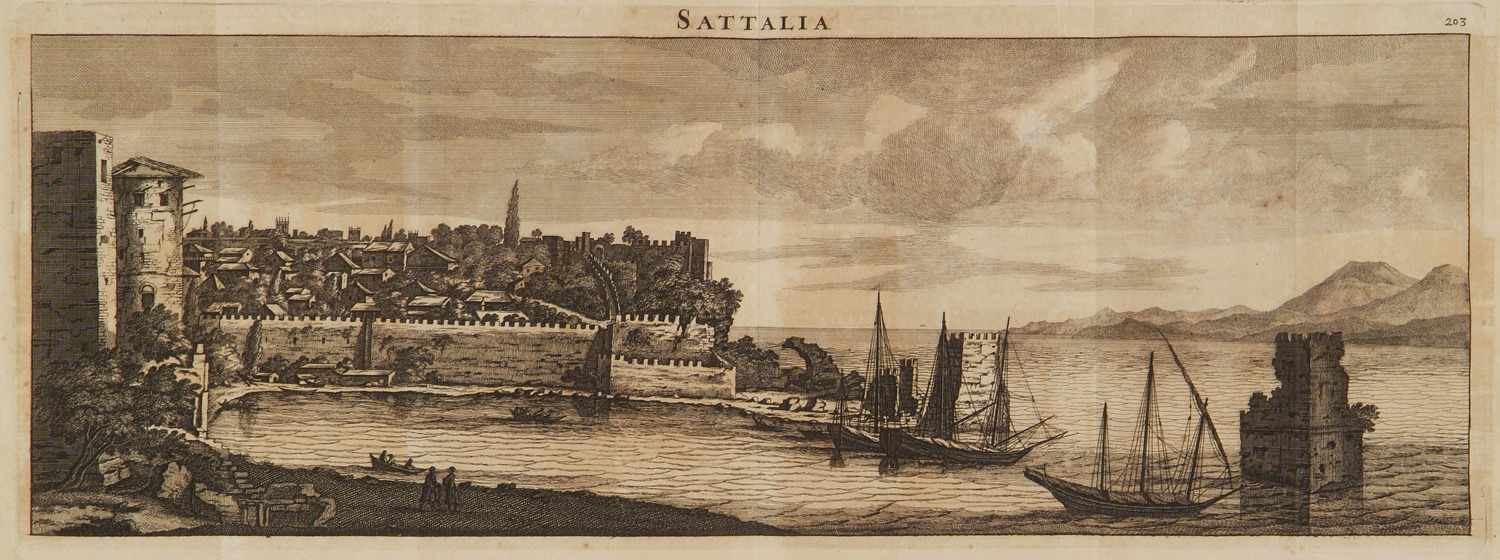
Harbour of Antalya (Sattalia), Turkey, 1698, by Cornelis de Bruyn. Voyage to the Levant, that is to say, in the principal places of Asia Minor, in the islands of Chios, Rhodes, and Cyprus etc., Paris, Guillaume Cavelier, 1714.

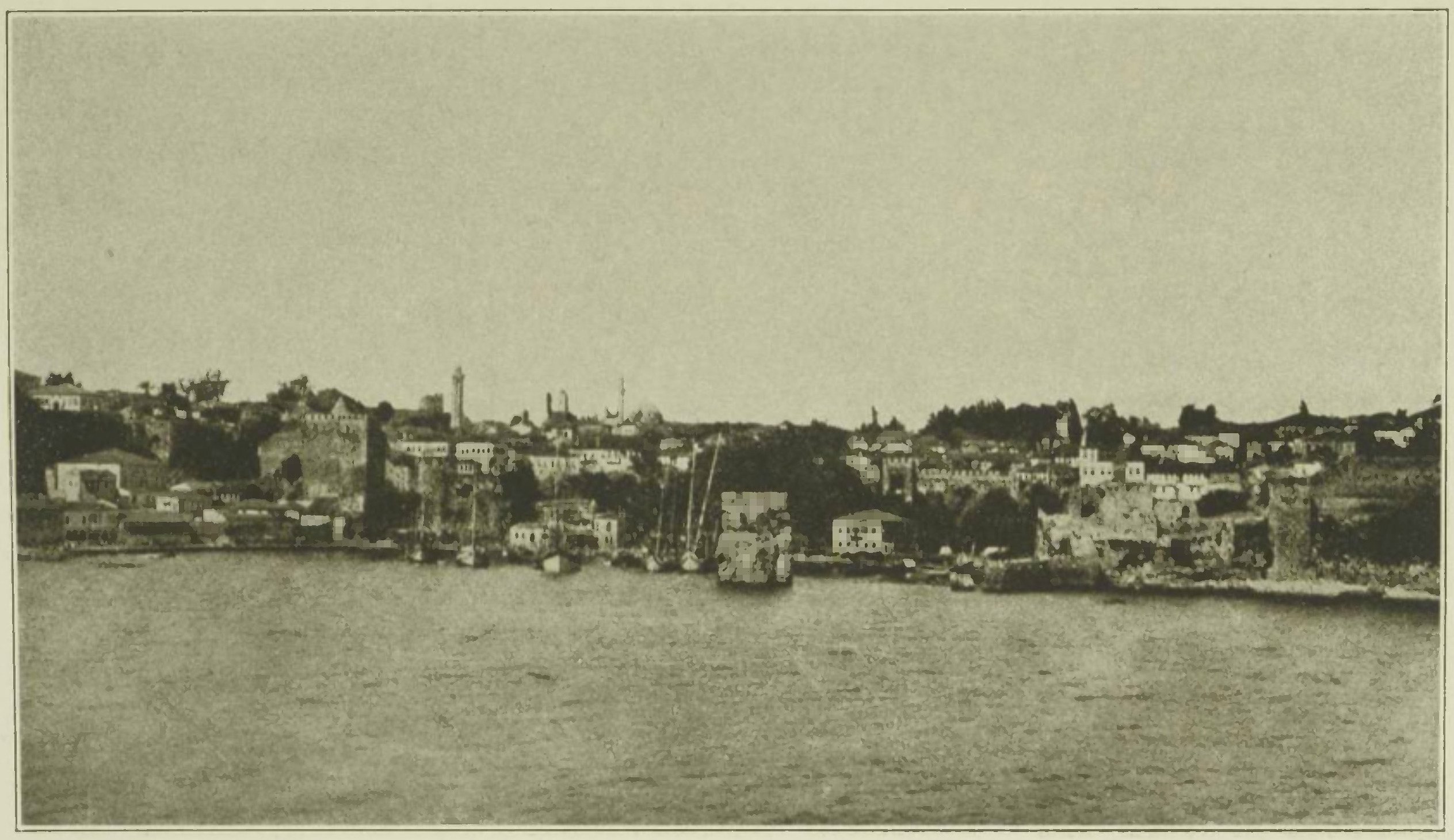
Old photo of Antalya harbour, Wilson - Voyage around the world, 1923.

Attaleia became part of the Roman Empire in 133 BC when Attalus III, a nephew of Attalus II, bequeathed his kingdom to Rome at his death in 133 BC. The city grew and prospered during the Ancient Roman period and was part of the Roman province of Pamphylia Secunda, whose capital was Perga. Christianity started to spread to the region even in the 1st century: Attaleia was visited by Paul of Tarsus and Barnabas, as recorded in the Acts of the Apostles: "Then they passed through Pisidia and came to Pamphylia. And when they had spoken the word in Perga, they went down to Attaleia, and from there they sailed to Antioch". Some of the bishops attributed to the episcopal see of Attaleia in Pamphylia may instead have been bishops of Attalea in Lydia (Yanantepe), since Le Quien lists them under both sees. No longer a residential bishopric, Attalea in Pamphylia is today listed by the Catholic Church as a titular see.

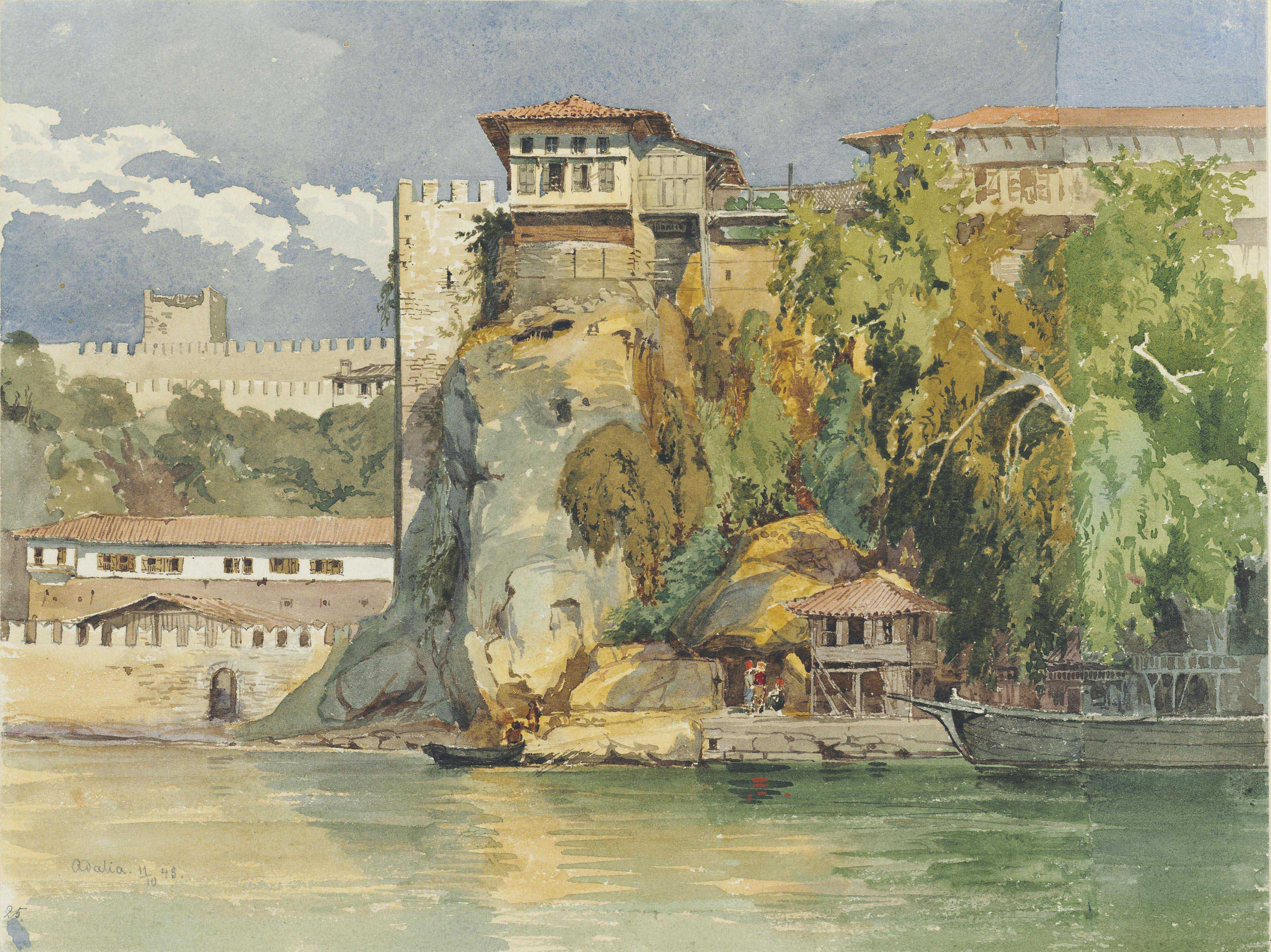
Max Schmidt – Antaliiskaya fortress, Antalya (1843)

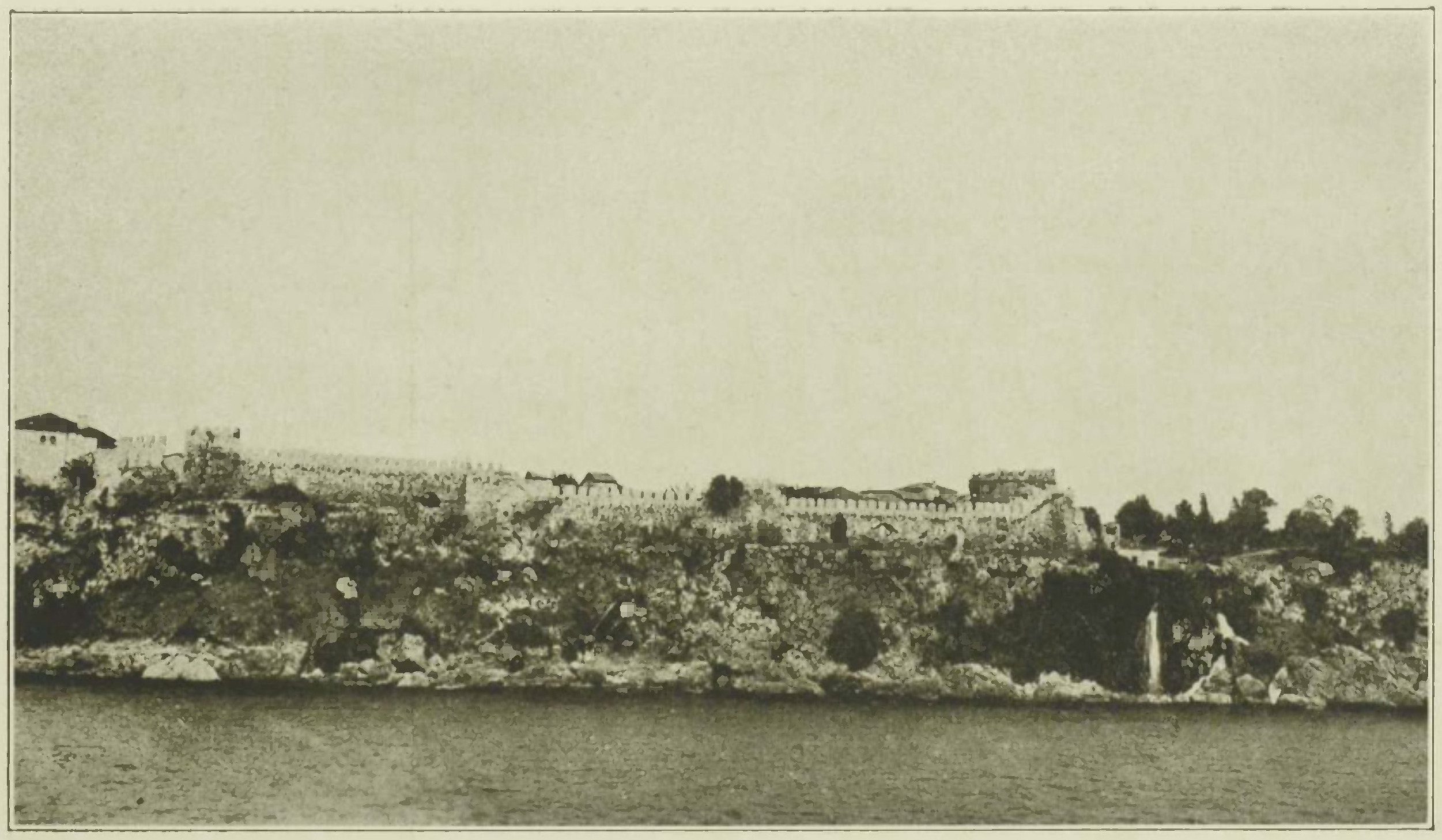
Ruins of Antalya castle, Charles A WIlson – Voyage around the world, 1923

The 13th-century Seljuk mosque at Attaleia, now in ruins, had been a Christian Byzantine basilica from the 7th century. The Great Mosque had also been a Christian basilica and the Kesik Minare Mosque had been the 5th-century Christian Church of the Panaghia or Virgin and was decorated with finely carved marble. The archaeological museum at Attaleia houses some sarcophagi and mosaics from nearby Perga and a casket of bones reputed to be those of St. Nicholas, the bishop of Myra, further down the Turquoise coast. The area of Antalya was subject to naval attacks by the Arabs of the Abbasid Caliphate.

Attaleia was a major city in the Byzantine Empire. It was the capital of the Byzantine Theme of the Cibyrrhaeots, which occupied the southern coasts of Anatolia. According to the research of Speros Vryonis, it was the major naval station on the southern Anatolian coast, a major commercial center, and the most convenient harbor between the Aegean Sea and Cyprus and points further east. Besides the local merchants, "one could expect to see Armenians, Saracens, Jews, and Italians."

At the time of the accession of John II Komnenos in 1118, Attaleia was an isolated outpost surrounded by Turkish beyliks, accessible only by sea, but his capture of Sozopolis in 1120 re-opened land-communication with the city once more. Upon learning of the death of emperor Manuel I Komnenos in 1180, the Seljuk sultan Kilij Arslan II subjected the city to a long siege, but failed to take it. Following the Sack of Constantinople by the Crusaders in 1204, Niketas Choniates records that Attaleia was the personal fiefdom of a certain Aldebrandus, "an Italian by birth who was strictly raised according to Roman tradition". When Kaykhusraw, sultan of the Seljuk Turks attempted to capture the city in 1206, Aldebrandus called Cyprus for help and received 200 infantry from the Latins. The attackers were defeated after a siege of less than 16 days. Kaykhusraw would take Attaleia the following year and build its first mosque. Local Christians rebelled and captured Attaleia with aid of Walter of Montbéliard in 1212. Briefly restored Byzantine rule in Attaleia was ended by Kaykaus I in 1216.

The city and the surrounding region were conquered by the Seljuk Turks in the early 13th century. Attaleia was the capital of the Turkish beylik of Teke (1321–1423) until its conquest by the Ottoman Turks, except for a period of Cypriot rule between 1361 and 1373. The Arab traveller Ibn Battuta, who visited the city in 1335–1340, noted:

From Alanya I went to Antaliya [Adalia], a most beautiful city. It covers an immense area, and though of vast bulk is one of the most attractive towns to be seen anywhere, besides being exceedingly populous and well laid out. Each section of the inhabitants lives in a separate quarter. The Christian merchants live in a quarter of the town known as the Mina [the Port], and are surrounded by a wall, the gates of which are shut upon them from without at night and during the Friday service. The Greeks, who were its former inhabitants, live by themselves in another quarter, the Jews in another, and the king and his court and Mamluks in another, each of these quarters being walled off likewise. The rest of the Muslims live in the main city. Round the whole town and all the quarters mentioned there is another great wall. The town contains orchards and produces fine fruits, including an admirable kind of apricot, called by them Qamar ad-Din, which has a sweet almond in its kernel. This fruit is dried and exported to Egypt, where it is regarded as a great luxury.

In the second half of the 17th century, Ottoman explorer Evliya Çelebi wrote of a city of narrow streets containing 3,000 houses in 20 Turkish and four Greek neighborhoods. The town had grown beyond the city walls and the port was reported to hold up to 200 boats.

In the 19th century, in common with most of Anatolia, its sovereign was a "dere bey" (landlord or landowner). The family of Tekke Oğlu, domiciled near Perge had been reduced to submission in 1812 by Mahmut II, but continued to be a rival power to the Ottoman governor until the early 20th century, surviving by many years the fall of the other great beys of Anatolia. The records of the Levent (Turkey) Company, which maintained an agency in Antalya until 1825, documented the local dere beys.

The Antalya Museum

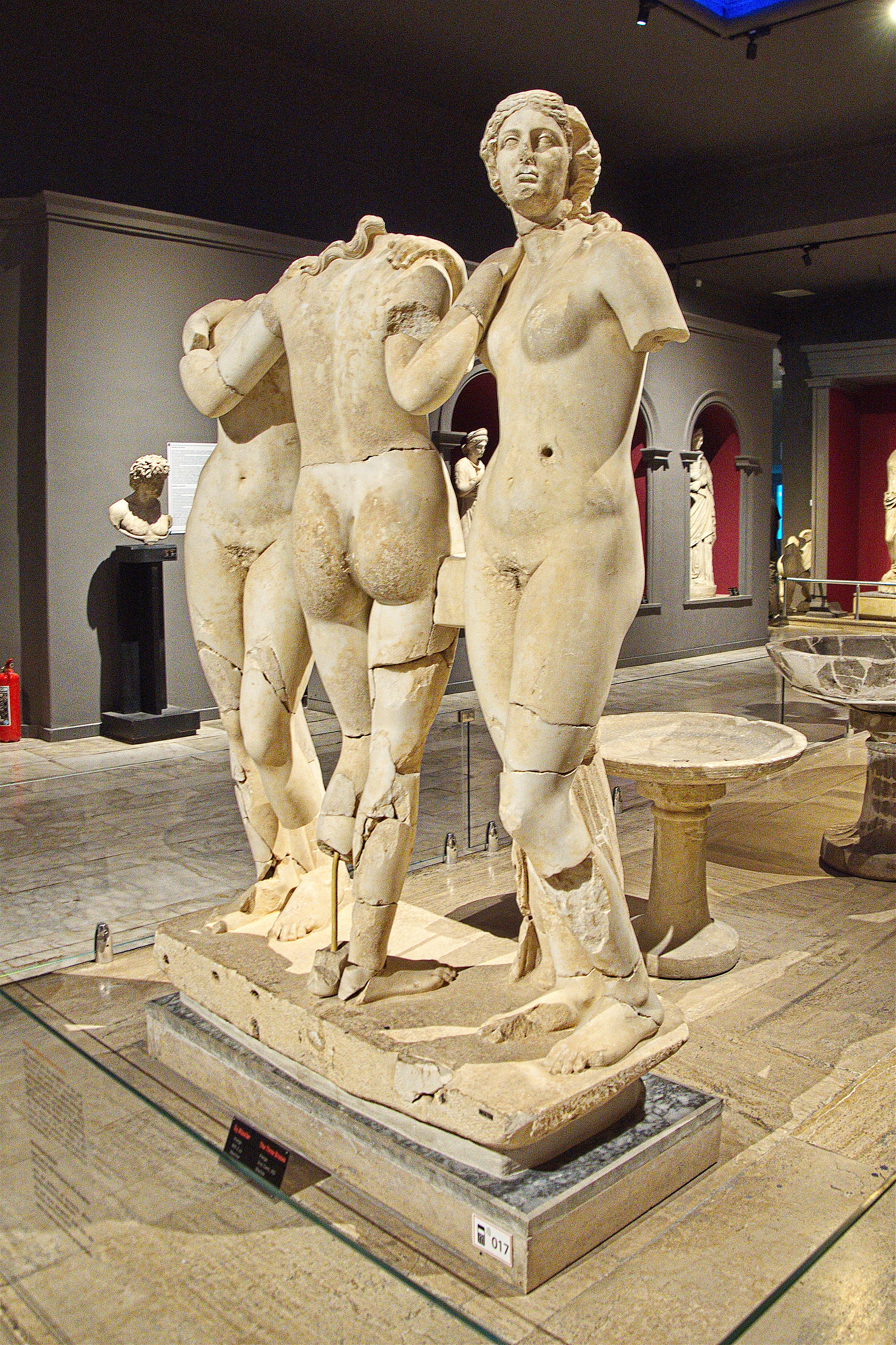
Sculpture of the Three Graces in the Antalya Museum

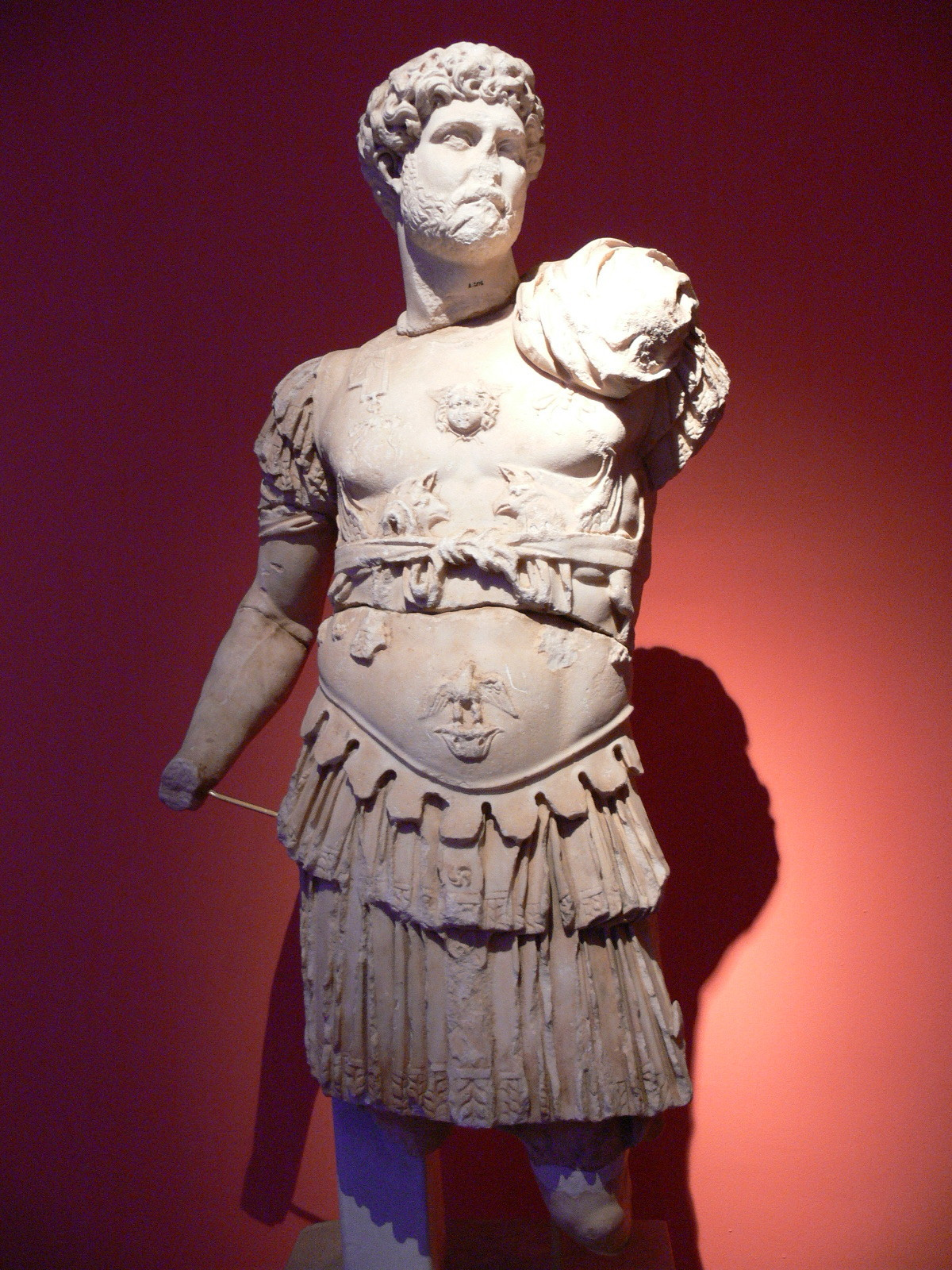
Statue of the Roman emperor Hadrian in the Antalya Museum

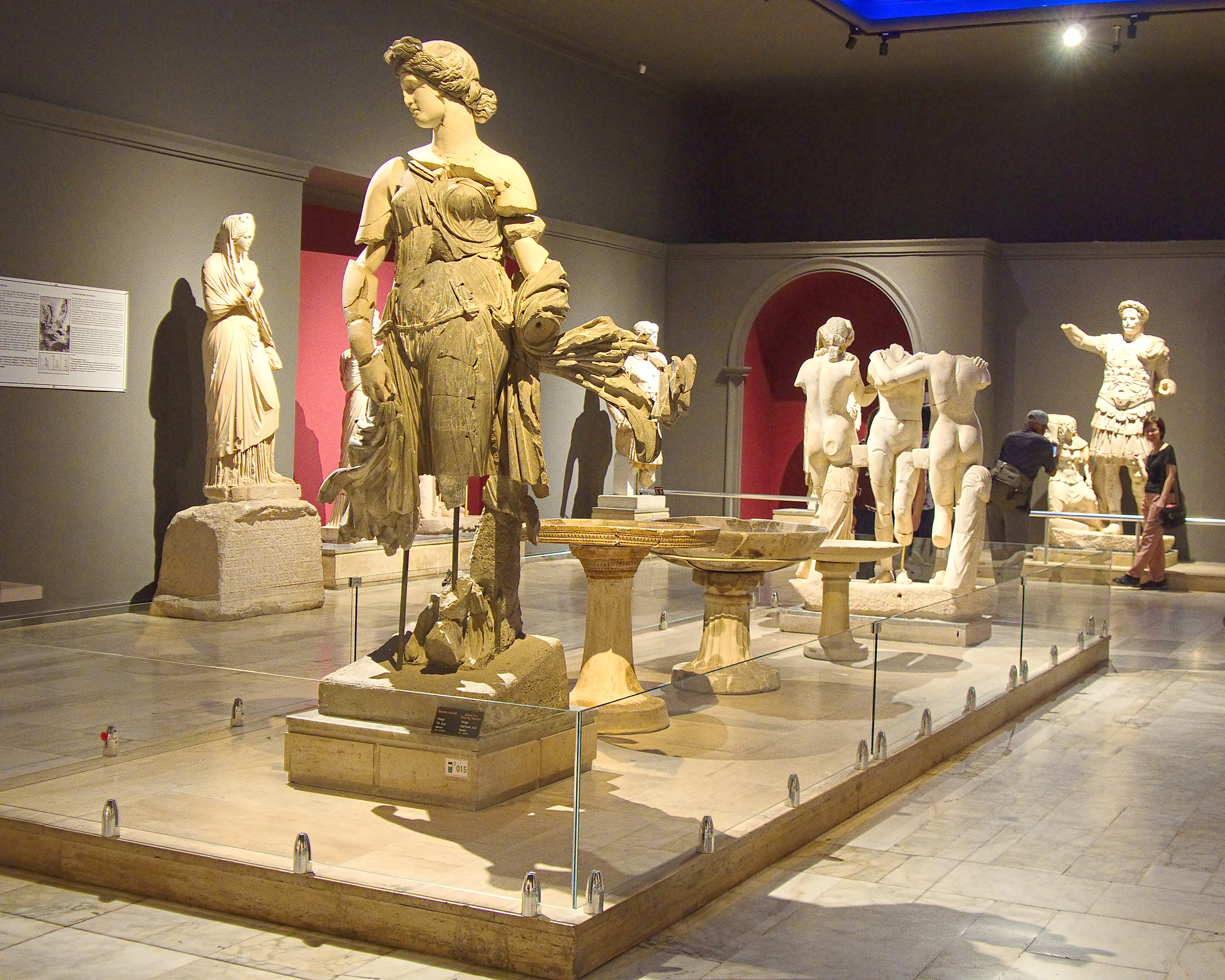
Marble statue of a dancing woman from Perge, 2nd century AD, Antalya Museum.

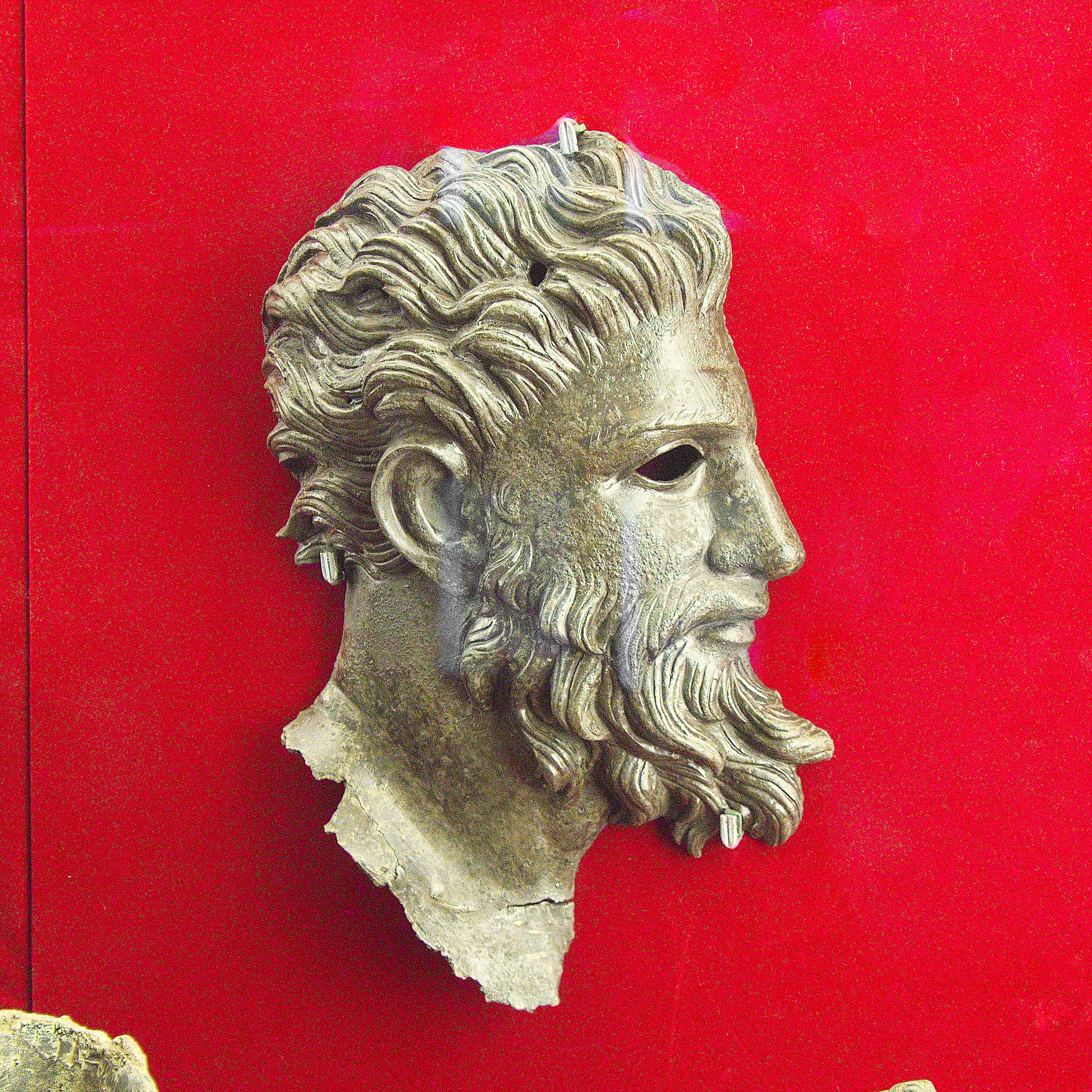
Ancient Roman theatrical mask fragment, Antalya Museum

In the 20th century, the population of Antalya increased as Muslim refugees from the Caucasus and the Balkans moved into Anatolia. The economy was centered on its port that served the inland areas, particularly Konya. Antalya (then Adalia) was picturesque rather than modern. The chief attraction for visitors was the city wall, and outside a promenade, a portion of which survives. The government offices and the houses of the higher classes were outside the walls.

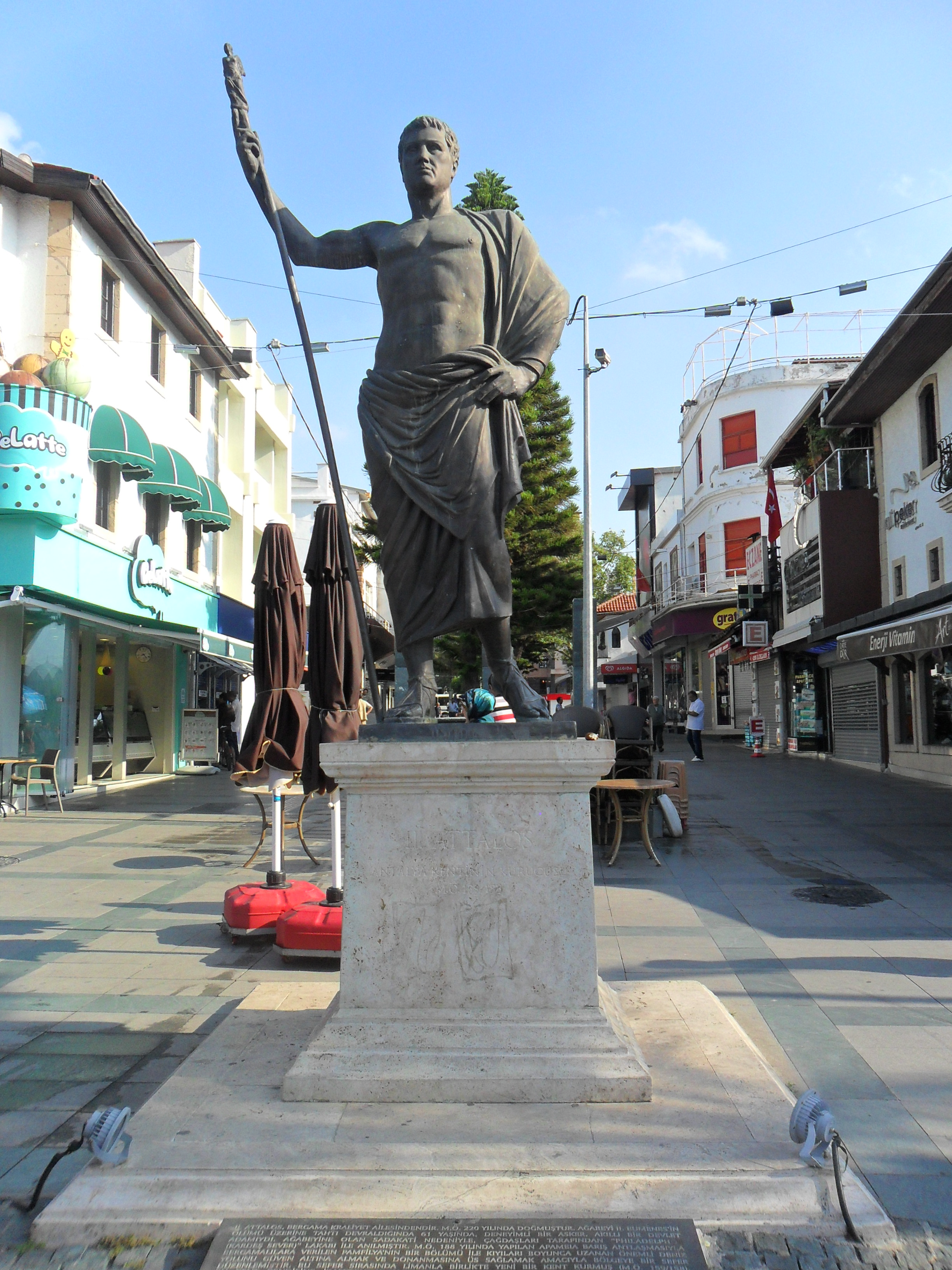
Statue of Attalus II in the city

As of 1920, Antalya was reported as having a population of approximately 30,000. The harbor was described as small, and unsafe for vessels to visit in the winter. Antalya was exporting wheat, flour, sesame seeds, livestock, timber and charcoal. The latter two were often exported to Egypt and other goods to Italy or other Greek islands, who received mainly flour. In 1920, the city had seven flour mills. Wheat was imported, and then processed in town before exportation. Antalya imported manufactured items, mainly from the United Kingdom.

The city had a Greek minority that made up 1/3 of the population until the population exchange. Antalya also had a tiny Armenian population which had a church on the street of "Hamam çikmazi" named Hovhannes Surp Garabed, which was later on demolished. Antalya also had a Jewish community which had a tiny Synagogue in the neighborhood of Balbey and a Talmud Torah. The Synagogue was closed in 1948 and its exact location is not known, and the Synagogue might not exist anymore. The Jewish community had two graveyards and one was located across "Donerciler carsisi"and was demolished when the area was opened to construction, but one marble tombstone belonging to a Jew named Raphael Moshe was transferred to the Antalya Museum where it can be seen in the museum garden.

The city was occupied by Italy for three years (1919–22) in the aftermath of World War I. Italy withdrew their troops and it was turned over to the newly independent Turkey in the Turkish War of Independence. Large-scale development beginning in the 1970s transformed Antalya from a pastoral town into one of Turkey's largest metropolitan areas. Much of this has been due to tourism, which expanded in the 21st century. In 1987 singing diva Dalida held her last concert in Antalya.

Antalya was the host city for the 2015 G-20 summit and the Expo 2016. Five countries have their consular missions in Antalya including Belgium, Germany, Russia, Serbia and the United Kingdom.

== Geography ==
=== Climate ===
Köppen map of Antalya Province and surrounding regions:
- BSk
- Csa
- Csb
- Dsa
- Dsb
- Dsc

Antalya has a hot-summer Mediterranean climate (Köppen: Csa) or a dry-summer humid subtropical climate (Trewartha: Cf or 'wet Cs'). It experiences hot, dry summers and mild, rainy winters. While rain is common and often heavy in winter, Antalya is very sunny, with nearly 3,000 hours of sunlight per year. Frost does occasionally occur at night almost every winter, but snow is a very rare phenomenon. The highest recorded air temperature was 45.4 °C (113.7 °F) on 1 July 2017 but later this record was removed and turned back to 45°C (113°F) in 6 July 2000. Record low is −4.6 °C (23.7°F) in 5 February 1950. Record snow depth is 5 cm (1.97 inches) in January 1993. The mean sea temperature ranges between 16 °C (61 °F) in winter and 27 °C (81 °F) in summer.

Climate data for Antalya (1991–2020, extremes 1930–present)
Month	Jan	Feb	Mar	Apr	May	Jun	Jul	Aug	Sep	Oct	Nov	Dec	Year
Record high °C (°F)	23.9 (75.0)	26.7 (80.1)	29.4 (84.9)	36.4 (97.5)	41.7 (107.1)	44.8 (112.6)	46.1 (115.0)	44.6 (112.3)	42.5 (108.5)	41.2 (106.2)	33.0 (91.4)	25.4 (77.7)	46.1 (115.0)
Mean daily maximum °C (°F)	15.0 (59.0)	15.9 (60.6)	18.4 (65.1)	21.8 (71.2)	26.4 (79.5)	31.6 (88.9)	34.9 (94.8)	34.9 (94.8)	31.7 (89.1)	27.3 (81.1)	21.6 (70.9)	16.7 (62.1)	24.7 (76.5)
Daily mean °C (°F)	9.8 (49.6)	10.8 (51.4)	13.1 (55.6)	16.4 (61.5)	20.9 (69.6)	25.7 (78.3)	28.9 (84.0)	29.0 (84.2)	25.6 (78.1)	20.9 (69.6)	15.3 (59.5)	11.4 (52.5)	19.0 (66.2)
Mean daily minimum °C (°F)	5.9 (42.6)	6.5 (43.7)	8.3 (46.9)	11.3 (52.3)	15.7 (60.3)	20.1 (68.2)	23.4 (74.1)	23.7 (74.7)	20.1 (68.2)	15.9 (60.6)	10.7 (51.3)	7.5 (45.5)	14.1 (57.4)
Record low °C (°F)	−4.3 (24.3)	−4.6 (23.7)	−1.6 (29.1)	1.4 (34.5)	6.7 (44.1)	11.1 (52.0)	14.8 (58.6)	13.6 (56.5)	10.3 (50.5)	4.9 (40.8)	0.0 (32.0)	−1.9 (28.6)	−4.6 (23.7)
Average precipitation mm (inches)	210.6 (8.29)	112.7 (4.44)	94.5 (3.72)	63.1 (2.48)	37.0 (1.46)	10.1 (0.40)	4.0 (0.16)	5.0 (0.20)	22.0 (0.87)	76.6 (3.02)	152.2 (5.99)	262.2 (10.32)	1,050 (41.34)
Average precipitation days	11.50	9.60	7.60	6.43	4.97	2.13	0.67	0.60	1.93	4.87	7.07	10.00	67.4
Average snowy days	0.13	0.38	0	0	0	0	0	0	0	0	0	0.13	0.64
Average relative humidity (%)	65.8	64.8	65.4	67.4	66.8	59.6	58.0	59.7	59.7	60.4	63.6	68.0	63.3
Mean monthly sunshine hours	151.9	161.0	201.5	231.0	291.4	330.0	344.1	325.5	273.0	232.5	177.0	145.7	2,864.6
Mean daily sunshine hours	4.9	5.7	6.5	7.7	9.4	11.0	11.1	10.5	9.1	7.5	5.9	4.7	7.8
Percentage possible sunshine	44	49	54	58	66	77	81	80	76	67	56	42	64
Source 1: Turkish State Meteorological Service
Source 2: NOAA (humidity, 1991-2020), Meteomanz(snow days 2000-2023)

Climate data for Antalya
Month	Jan	Feb	Mar	Apr	May	Jun	Jul	Aug	Sep	Oct	Nov	Dec	Year
Average sea temperature °C (°F)	17.7 (63.9)	16.8 (62.2)	17.2 (63.0)	17.9 (64.2)	21.1 (70.0)	25.1 (77.2)	27.8 (82.0)	28.8 (83.8)	27.4 (81.3)	24.7 (76.5)	21.1 (70.0)	18.8 (65.8)	22.0 (71.7)
Average Wind Speed m/sec (Kph)	3.5; 13	3.4; 12	3.3; 12	2.8; 10	2.6; 9.4	2.9; 10	2.8; 10	2.6; 9.4	2.7; 9.7	2.7; 9.7	2.7; 9.7	3.1; 11	2.9; 10
Mean daily daylight hours	10.0	11.0	12.0	13.0	14.0	15.0	14.0	14.0	12.0	11.0	10.0	10.0	12.2
Average Ultraviolet index	2	3	5	7	8	10	10	9	7	5	3	2	5.9
Source #1: NCEI(Wind speed)
Source #2: Weather Atlas
Source #3: Average sea temperature:

== Demographics ==
In 2010, the Address-Based Birth Recording System showed a metropolitan population of 1,001,318 (502,491 male; 498,827 female). Source for 1530–1889. According to the TÜİK Institute of Statistics, as of October 2022, 120,000 foreigners live in the city.

=== Ethnic and religious groups ===
Despite being a coastal trade hub, Antalya wasn't a cosmopolitan town until contemporary times. During the late Ottoman rule, the Turks made up the vast majority of the city, followed by a Greek minority. Armenian and Jewish populations were almost non-existent. In the 1920s, as part of the population exchange, Greeks left the city and they were replaced by the Turks from Western Thrace.

Historical population
Year	Pop.	±%
1530	3,450	—
1811	8,000	+131.9%
1870	11,000	+37.5%
1889	25,000	+127.3%
1911	25,000	+0.0%
1927	17,000	−32.0%
1935	23,000	+35.3%
1940	25,000	+8.7%
1945	26,000	+4.0%
1950	28,000	+7.7%
1955	36,000	+28.6%
1960	51,000	+41.7%
1965	72,000	+41.2%
1970	95,000	+31.9%
1985	258,139	+171.7%
1990	378,208	+46.5%
2000	603,190	+59.5%
2007	775,157	+28.5%
2010	1,001,318	+29.2%
2024	1,508,134	+50.6%

== Economy ==
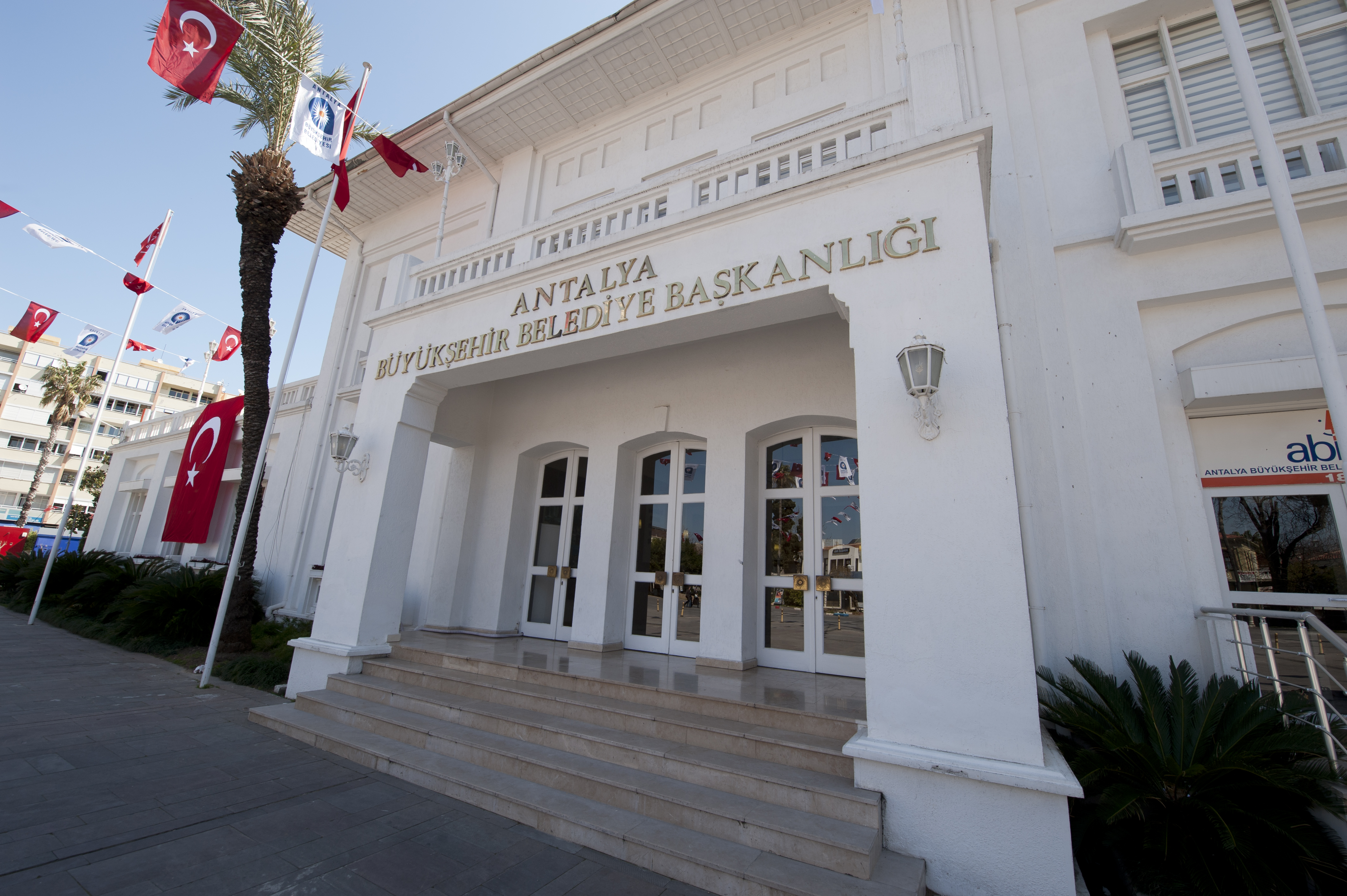
Antalya Metropolitan city building

Agricultural production includes citrus fruits, cotton, cut flowers, olives, olive oil and bananas. Antalya Metropolitan Municipality's covered wholesale food market complex meets 65% of the fresh fruit and vegetable demand of the province.

Since 2000, shipyards have been opened in Antalya Free Zone, specialized in building pleasure yachts. Some of these yards have advanced in composites boat building technology.

Corendon Airlines, Mavi Gök Airlines, Southwind Airlines and SunExpress are headquartered in Antalya.

Antalya is one of the Mediterranean's leading tourism destinations, the city being home to an array of famous attractions. In 2012, it was reported it attracted 30% of foreign tourists visiting Turkey.

In 2022, Antalya received 13.4 million foreign tourists by air.

== Cityscape ==
Despite having architectural heritage dating back up to Hellenistic times, most historical architecture in Antalya date to the medieval Seljuk period, with a number of mosques, madrasahs, masjids, caravanserais, hamams and tombs giving the city a Turkish-Islamic character. Historical architecture is concentrated in the walled city, Kaleiçi; ancient structures are not well-preserved in the rest of the city of Antalya as the modern city was built on the ancient city. Kaleiçi, with its narrow cobbled streets of historic Ottoman era houses, is the old center of Antalya. With its hotels, bars, clubs, restaurants, and shopping, it has been restored to retain much of its historical character. It is surrounded by two walls in the shape of a horsenail, one of which is along the seafront, built in a continuous process from Hellenistic to Ottoman times. The historical harbour is located in this part of the city; narrow streets extend from the harbour and branch off into the old city, surrounded by wooden historical houses. Cumhuriyet Square, the main square of the city and a spot very popular for tourists and locals, is surrounded by shopping and business centres and public buildings. There are sites with traces of Hellenistic, Roman, Byzantine, and Seljuk architecture and cultures. There are also examples of the local Greek architecture in the city, with five Greek Orthodox churches in the old city.

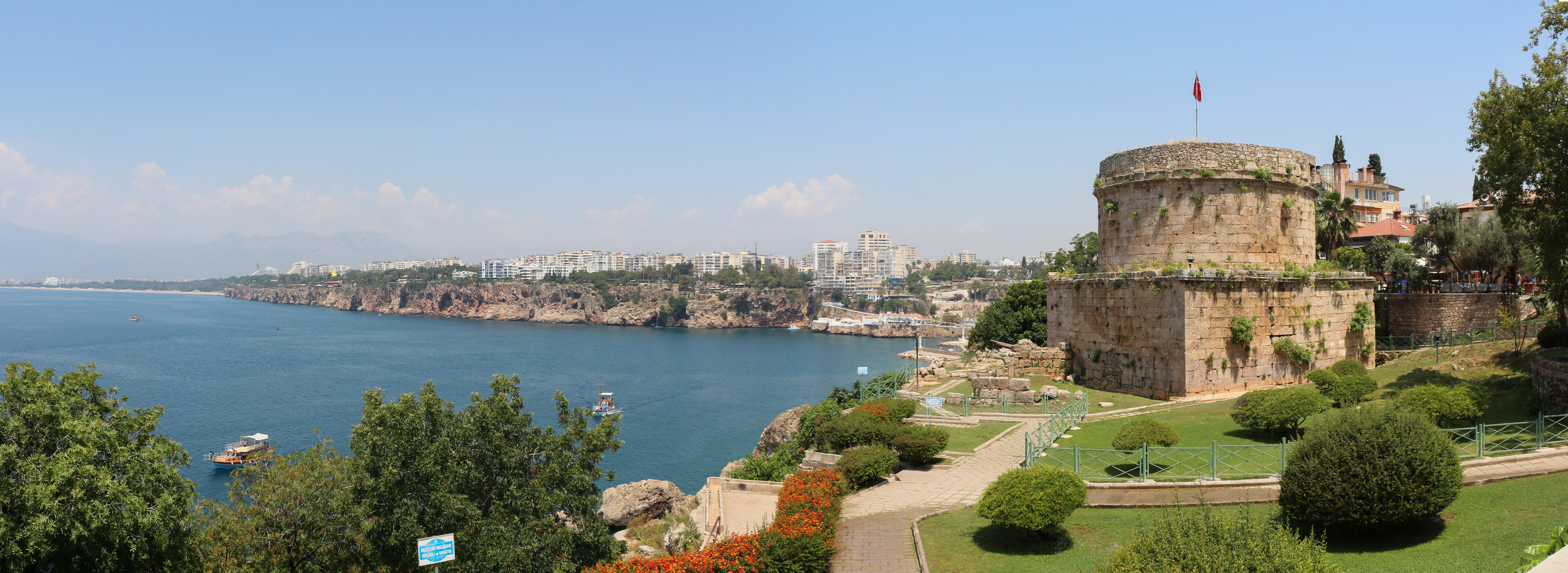
A panoramic view from Karaalioğlu Park with Historic Hıdırlık Tower

The walled city is surrounded by a large metropolitan area. With high rates of immigration since the 1970s, this area contains large gecekondu neighborhoods that are not well-integrated into the fabric of the city and suffer from poor economic conditions and insufficient education. Gecekondu areas are concentrated in the Kepez district, where an estimated 70% of the houses were gecekondus in 2008. In 2011, it was estimated that there were 50–60,000 gecekondus in Antalya, housing around 250,000 people.

Antalya has beaches including Konyaaltı, Lara and Karpuzkaldıran. Beydağları and Saklikent are used for winter sports.

=== Historic sites in the city center ===
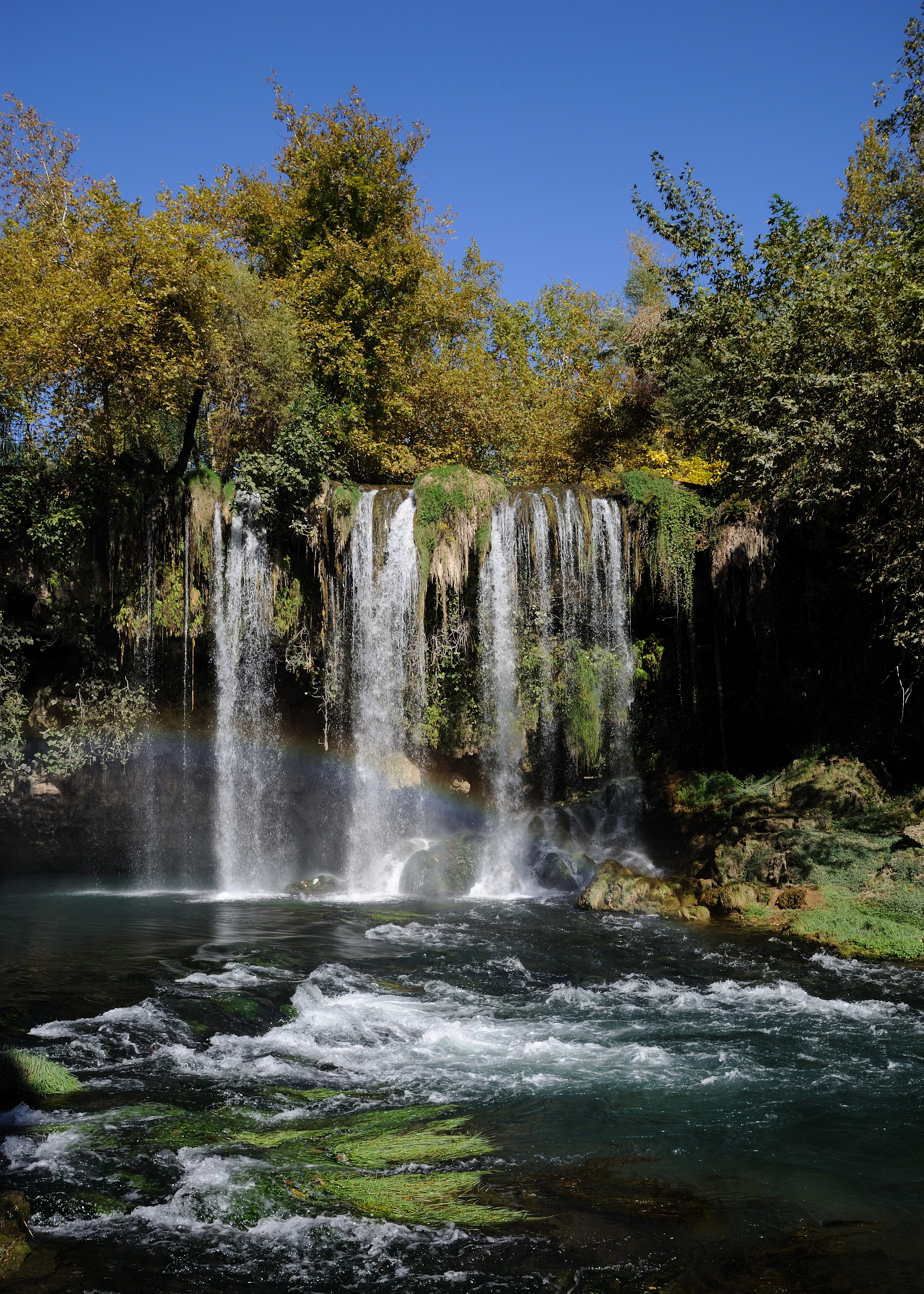
- The city is popular for its waterfalls.
  Ancient monuments include the City Walls, Hıdırlık Tower, Hadrian's Gate (also known as Triple Gate), and the Clock Tower.
- Hadrian's Gate: constructed in the 2nd century by the Romans in honor of the Emperor Hadrian.
- İskele Mosque: A 19th-century Mosque near the marina.
- Karatay Medrese: A Medrese (Islamic theological seminary) built in 1250 by Emir Celaleddin Karatay.
- Kesik Minare (Broken Minaret) Mosque: Once a Roman temple then converted to a Byzantine Panayia church and finally into a mosque.
- Tekeli Mehmet Paşa Mosque: An 18th-century Mosque built in honor of Tekeli Mehmet Paşa.
- Yat Limanı: the harbour dating to Roman era.
- Yivli Minare (Fluted Minaret) Mosque: Built by the Seljuks and decorated with dark blue and turquoise tiles. This minaret eventually became the symbol of the city.
- Murat Pasha Mosque: A historic Ottoman mosque located in the city center.
- Aya Yorgi Church (Saint George Church): A historic church built by the Greeks of Antalya which is currently used as a museum housing exhibitions of historical artifacts.
- Saint Alypius Church: A tiny historic Greek Orthodox church which is still currently a functioning Orthodox Church.
- Sultan Aladdin Mosque: A historic building built as a Greek Orthodox church in 1834 and converted into a mosque in the 1950s and currently used as a Mosque.
- Ahi Yusuf Mosque: A historic mosque built in the year of 1249 and is possibly one of the oldest mosques in Antalya or even the oldest.
- Ahi Kizi Masjid: Historic masjid located in the old town.
- Kara Molla Masjid: Tiny historic masjid built in the 14th century.
- Balibey Mosque: A historic mosque built by the vizier Bali Pasha.
- Müsellim Mosque: A small historic mosque built by Hacı Osmanoğlu Mehmed Ağa in 1796.
- Antalya Synagogue: A historic Synagogue used as house currently in the Balbey neighborhood between Kavakli Masjid and the Balbey Kesik Minaret Mosque.
- Mevlevihane (Dervish lodge museum): A former Dervish lodge housing a museum about Dervishes and Sufism.
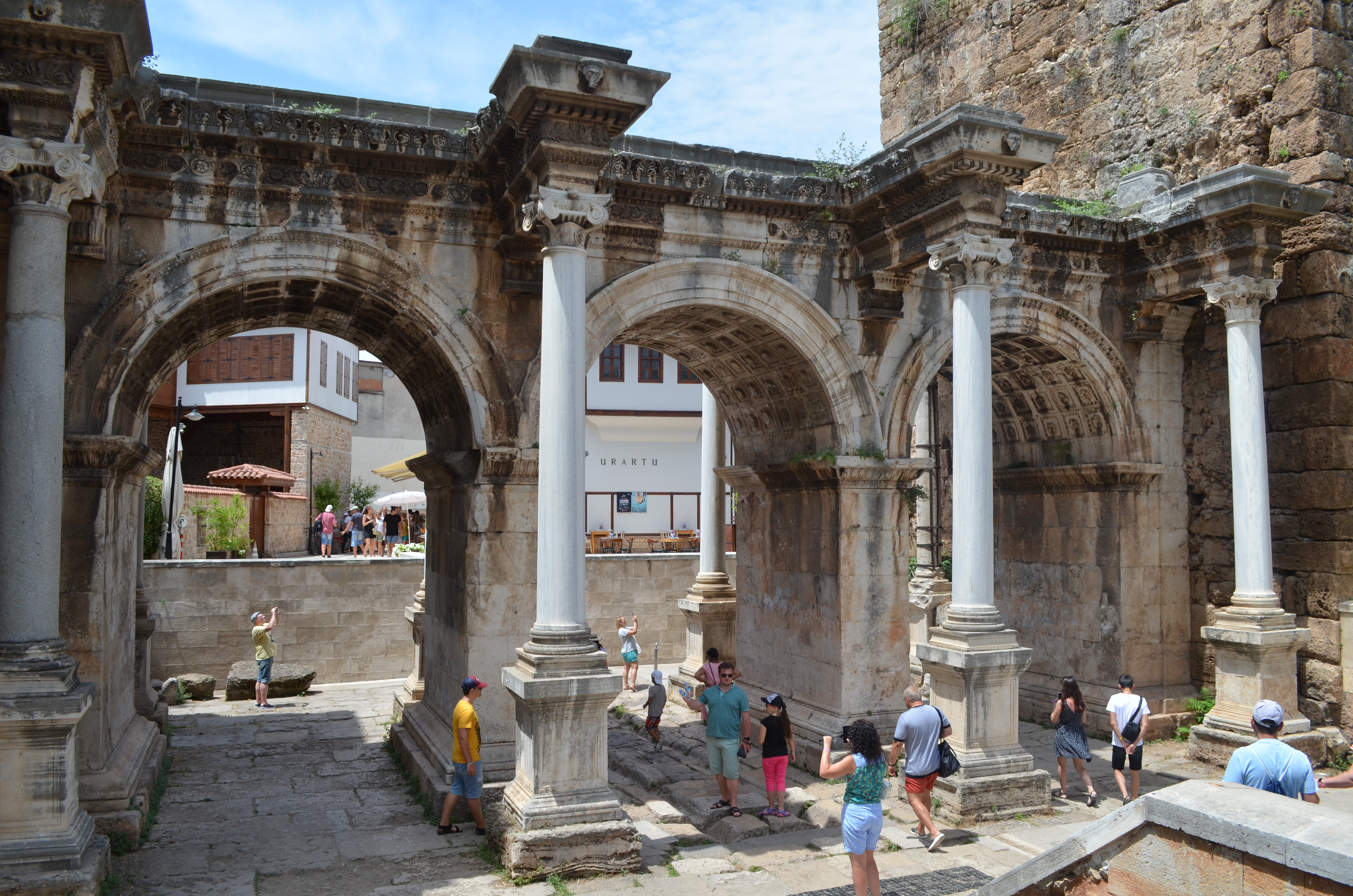
Hadrian's Gate

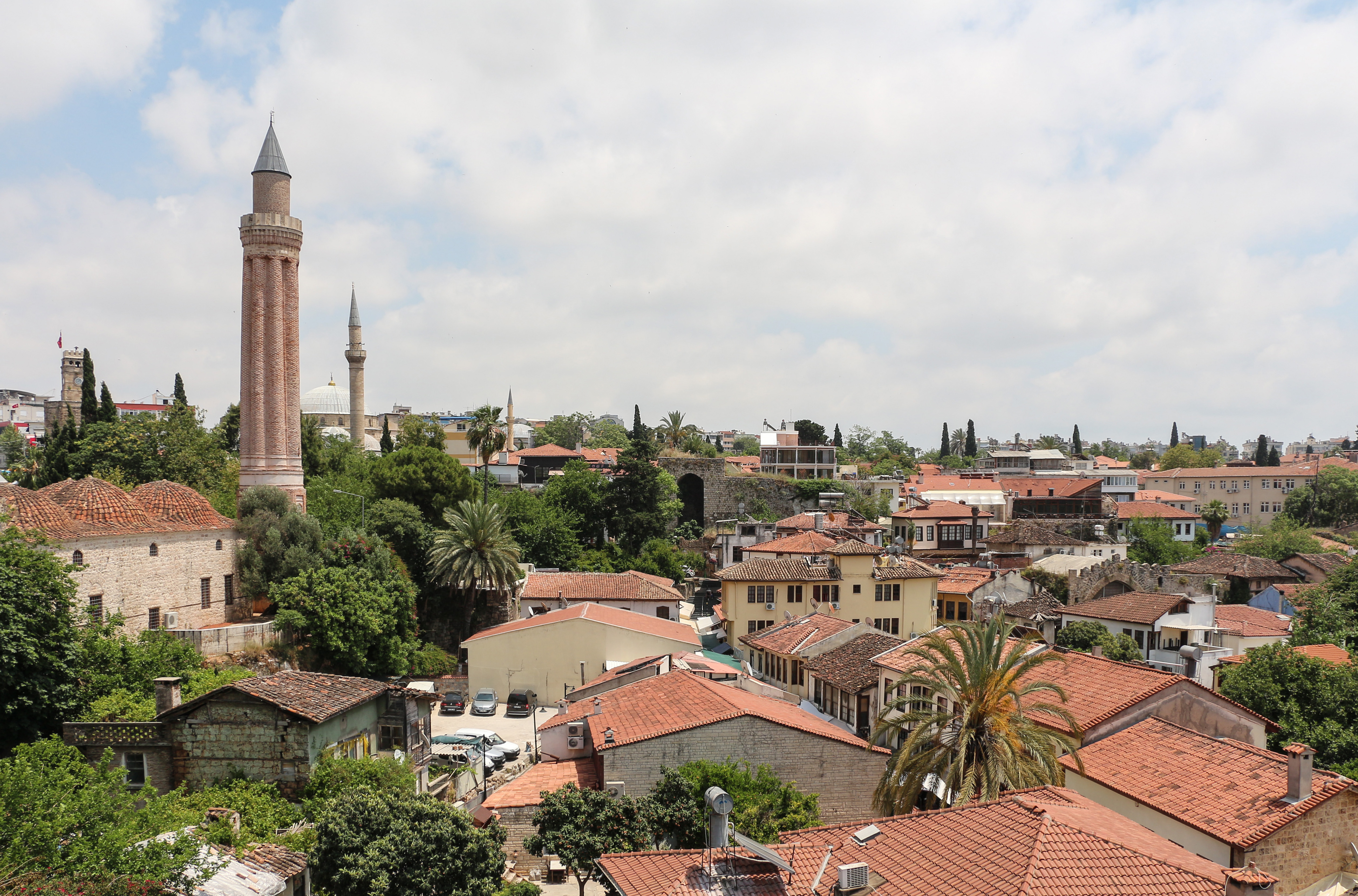
Yivli Minare

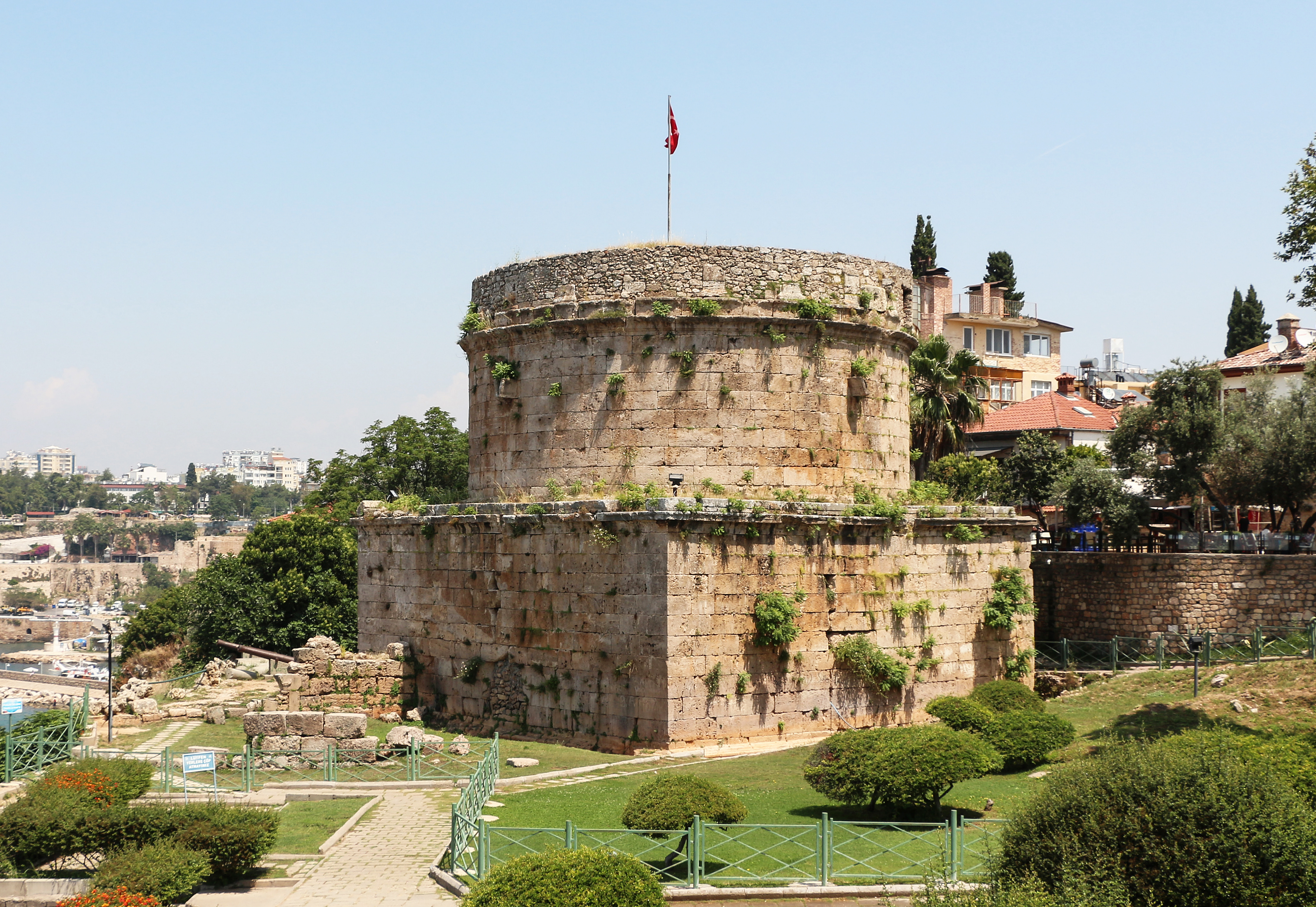
Hıdırlık Tower

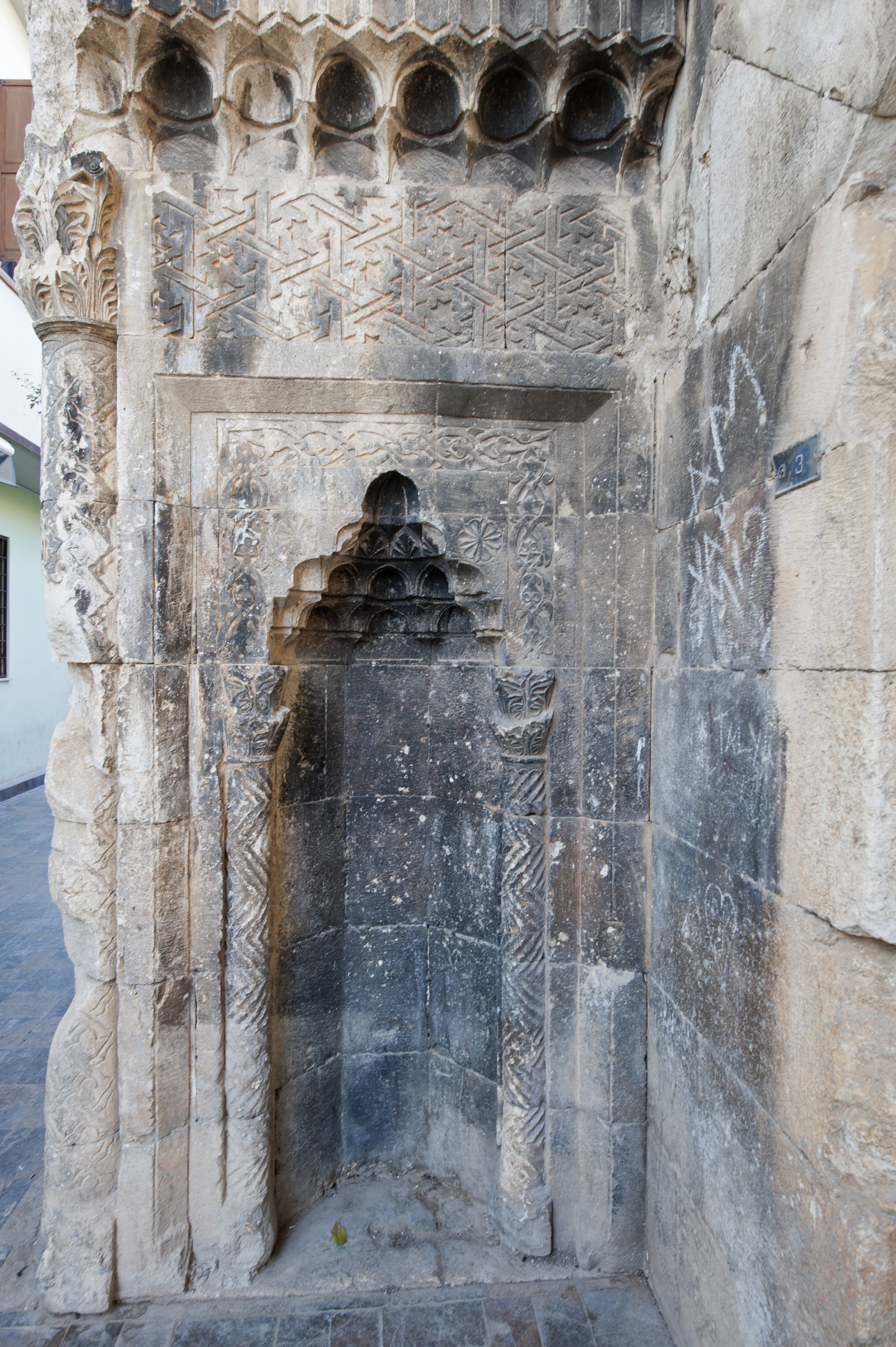
Antalya Karatay Medrese

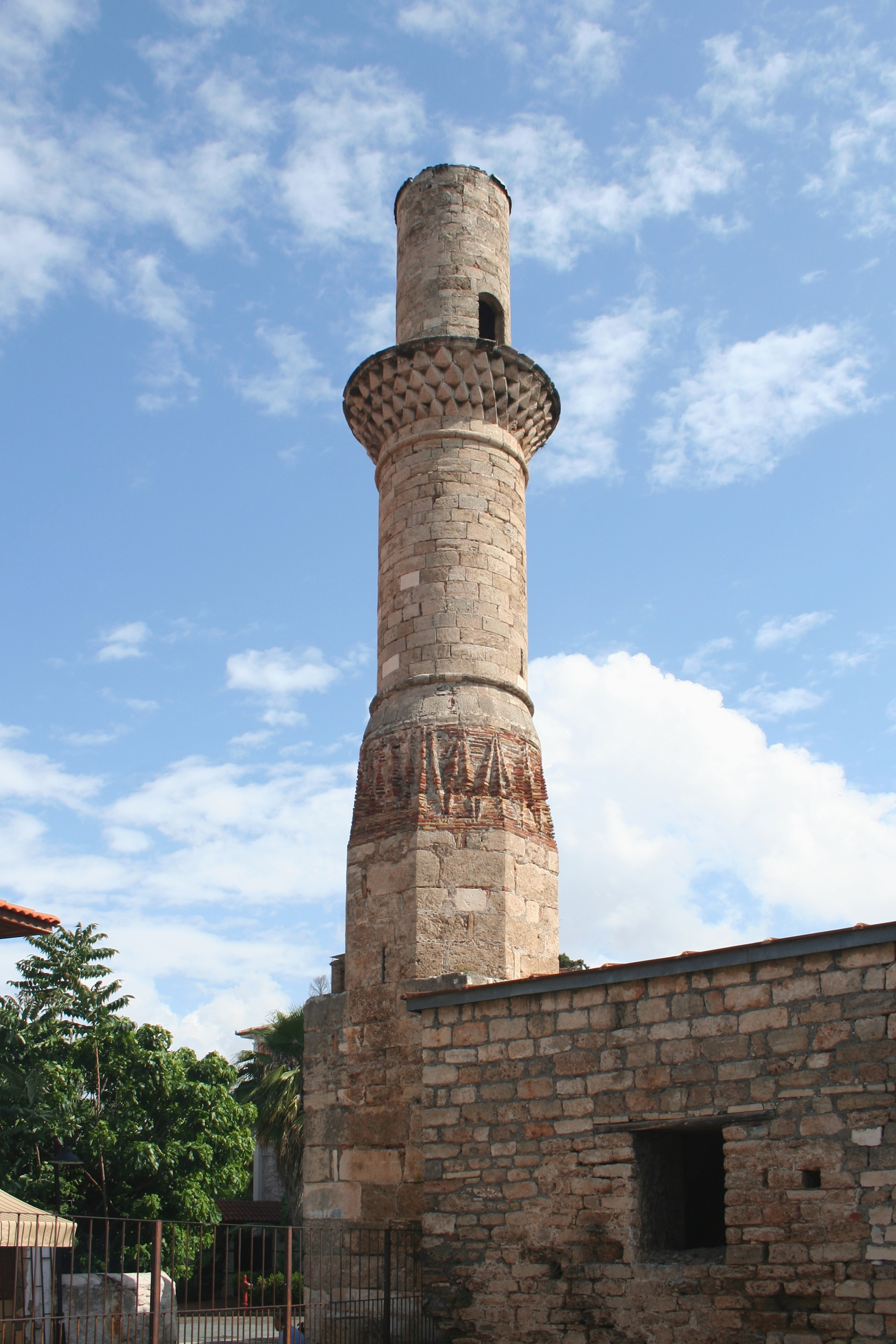
Kesik Minare

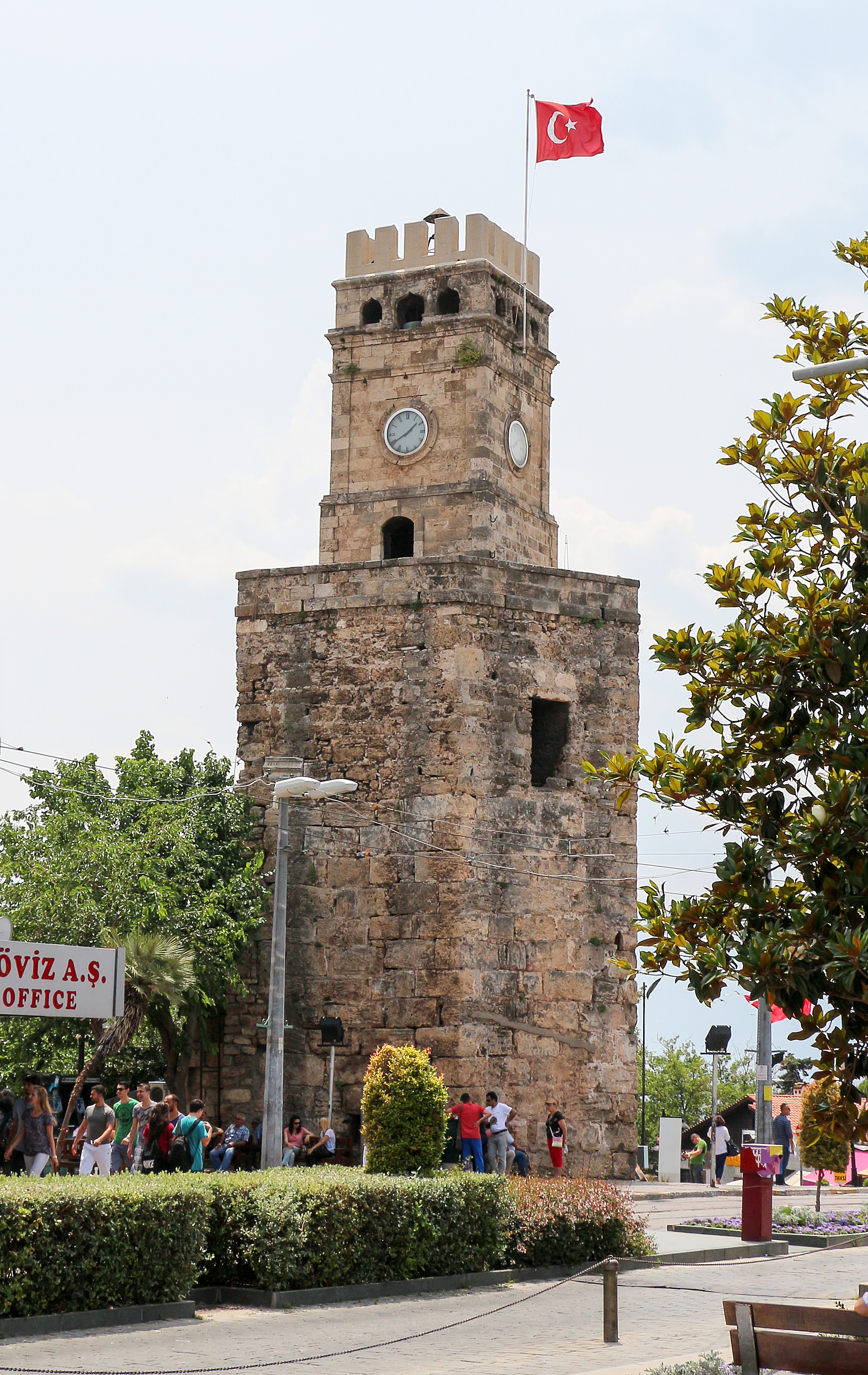
Antalya Clock Tower

=== Main sights ===
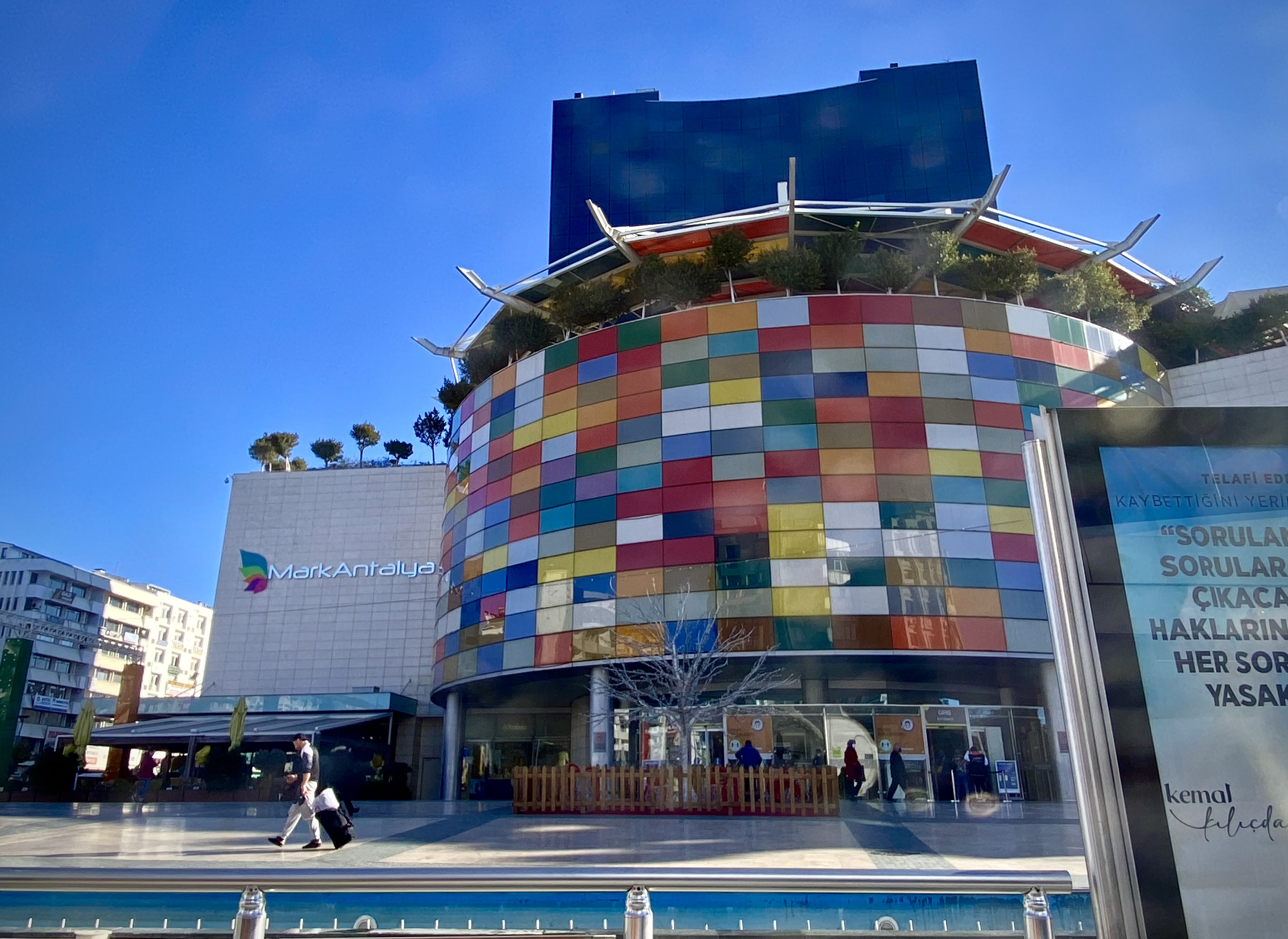
Mark Antalya shopping center

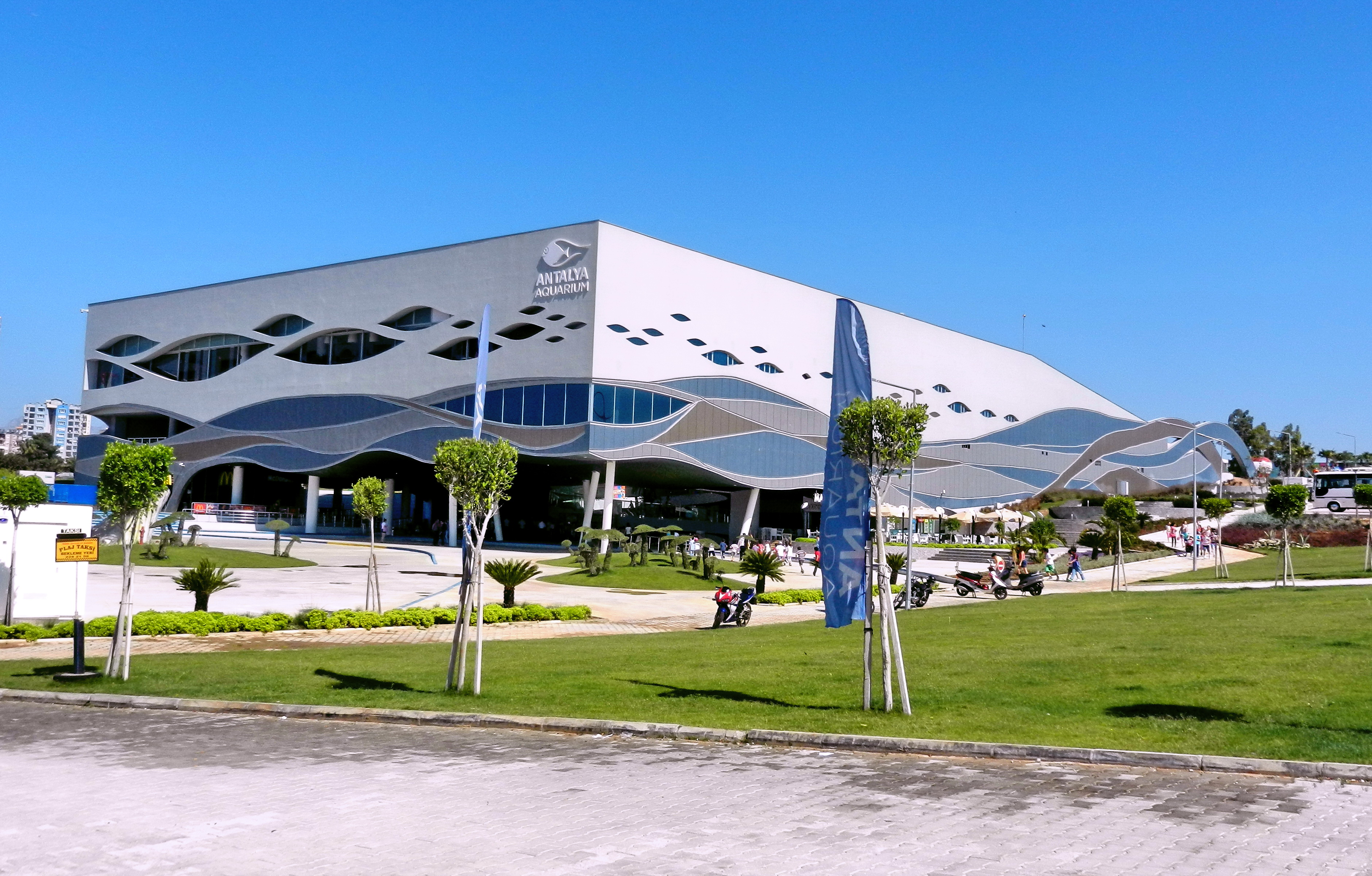
Antalya Aquarium

- Akdeniz Kent Parkı
- Antalya Aquarium
- Arapsu Bridge
- Atatürk Culture Park (formerly named after Hasan Subaşı)
- Düden Waterfalls
- Heart of Antalya
- Karaalioglu Park
- Konyaaltı Beach
- Tünektepe

=== Green areas, recreation places ===
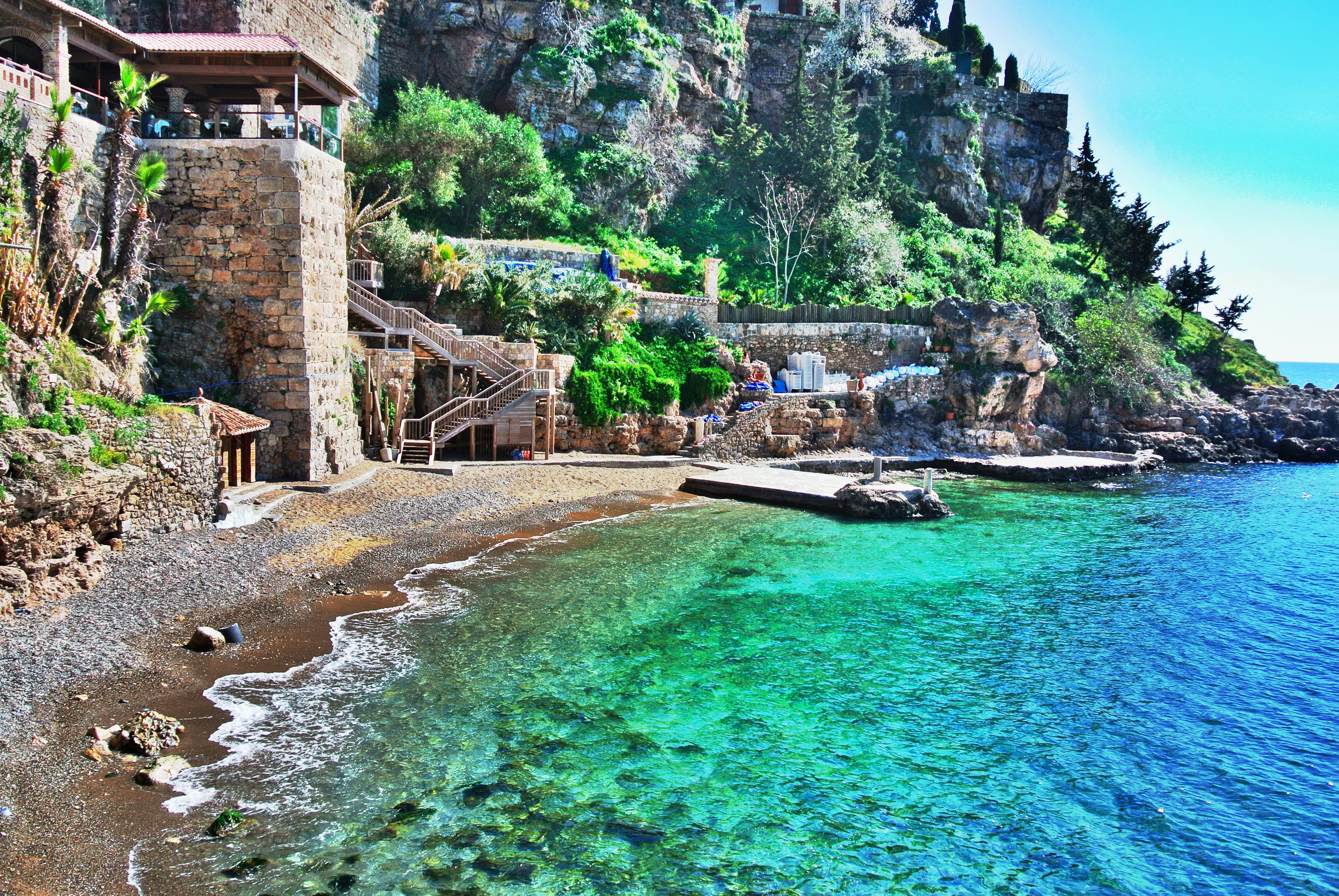
Antalya is the most popular summer tourism destination in Turkey.

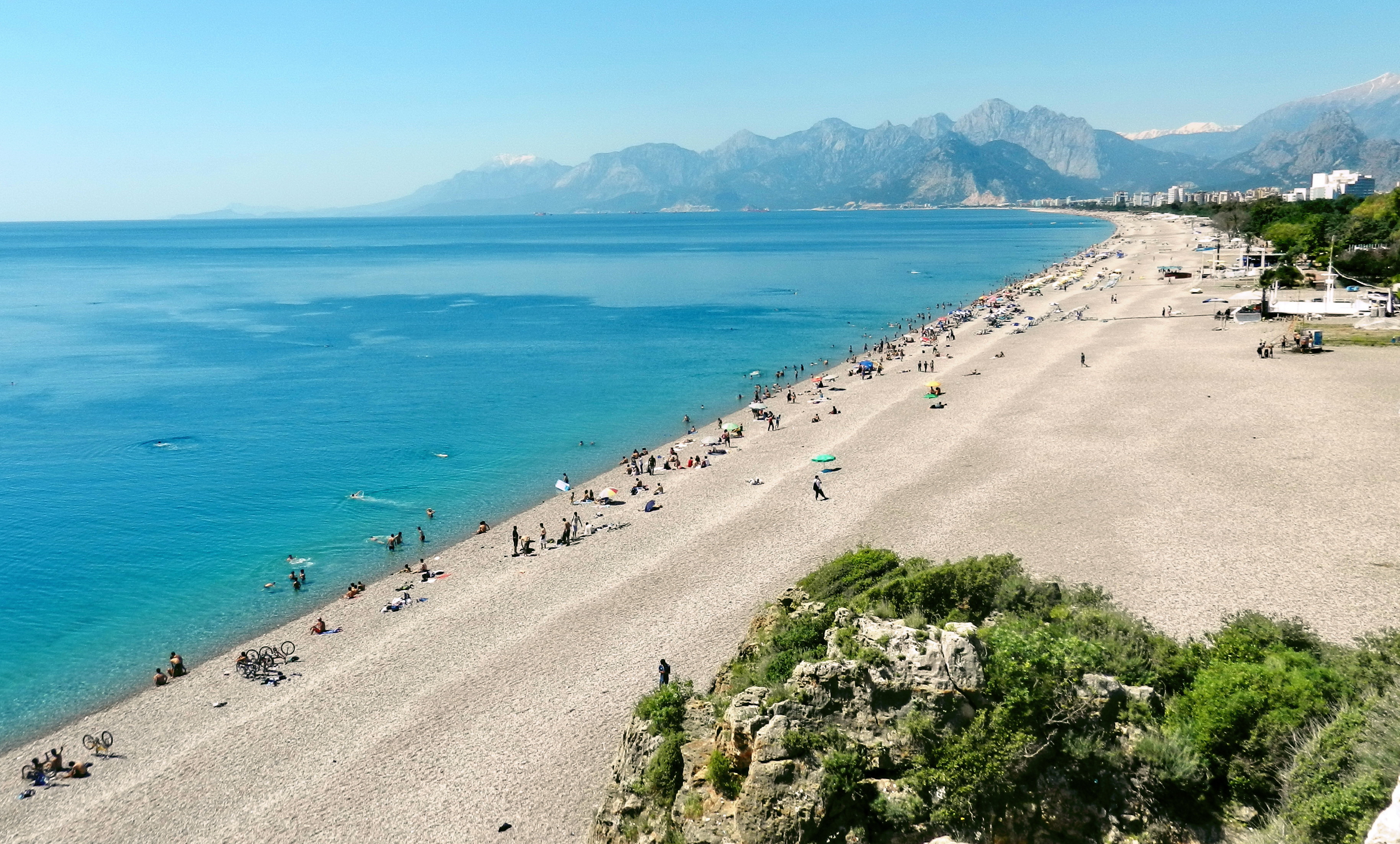
Antalya beach

There are urban parks and protected natural areas located outside the cities, allowing the people to have fun, rest and get closer to nature. Some of them are green areas around lake, pond and dam lakes, and some are highland and forest areas.

The prime urban green areas include Antalya City Forest, Atatürk Park, Kepez City Forest.

The largest amusement park in Antalya is the Aktur Park. Other modern recreational areas include 3 aquaparks in the city, Konyaaltı, Lara beaches, Beachpark especially for summer holidays, while Saklıkent also has facilities for skiing in the winter months.

The preserved nature areas include Güllük Mountain National Park in Antalya-Korkuteli highway, Mount Olympus National Park in Kemer and Düden and Kurşunlu Waterfalls. Other protected areas include the Damlataş and the Karain Cave and the Guver Cliff.

It offers picnic and recreation facilities in various parts of the city. Picnic areas, rafting facilities in Köprülü Kanyon in Manavgat. The part of Korkuteli-Antalya border in western part of Antalya is covered with forests. In these areas, picnic areas, playground, restaurant and similar facilities are provided. There are lake and forest views on the promenade at Feslikan Plateau to the west of the city center where visitors can also enjoy nature sports and nature walks. The oil wrestling competition festival organized in summer, what accompanied with concerts. The pond in Doyran town, located to the west of city is very suitable for picnic and fishing.

In addition to the open air recreation areas, the number of shopping centers, which have increased rapidly in recent years, can also be classified as a rest area with the facilities they offer. The shopping centers in the city are gathered in the center. Among the leading shopping centers in the city are Antalya 5M Migros, Antalya Kipa, Terra City, Deepo, Agora, and Mall of Antalya.

== Government ==
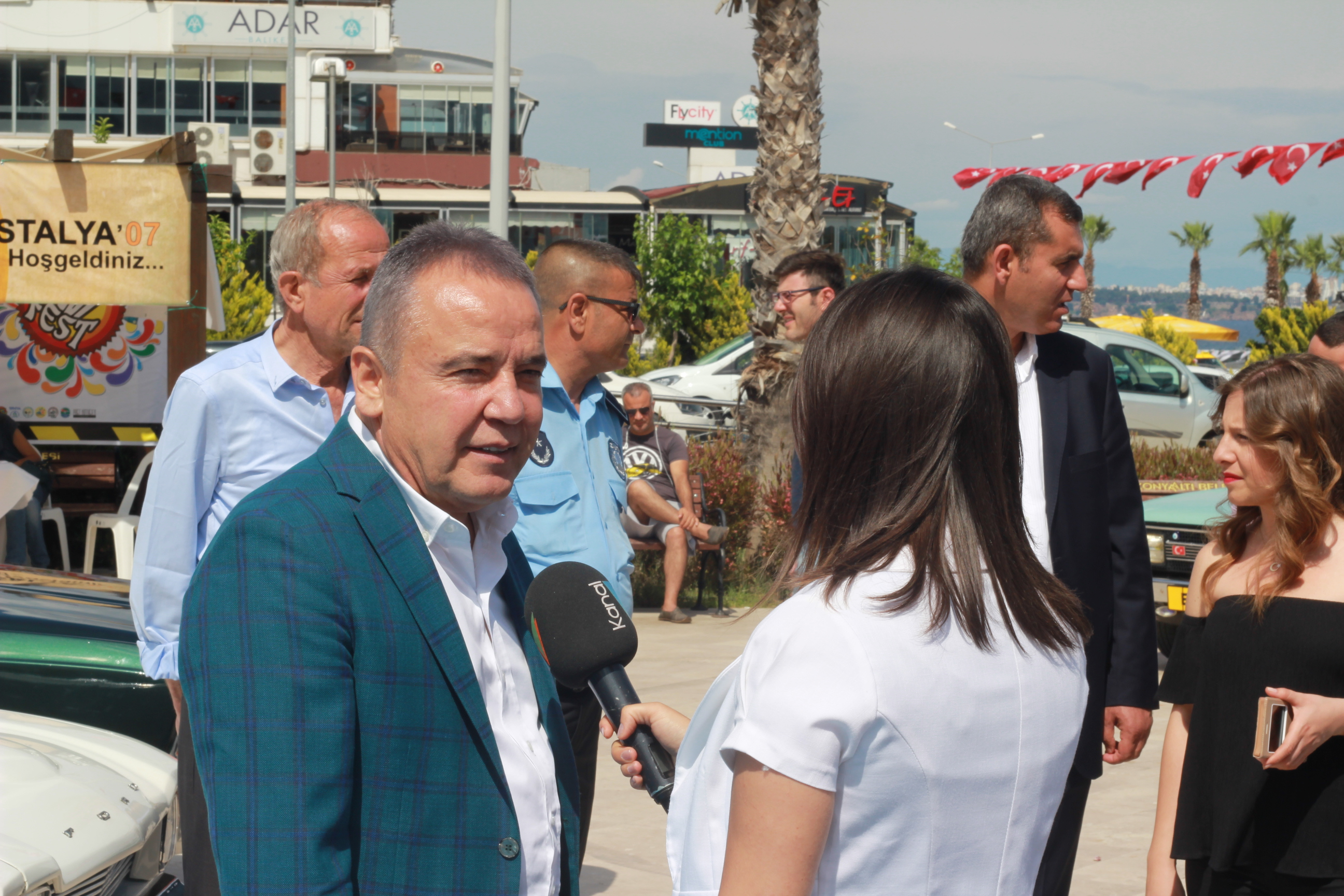
Muhittin Böcek, current mayor of Metropolitan Municipality

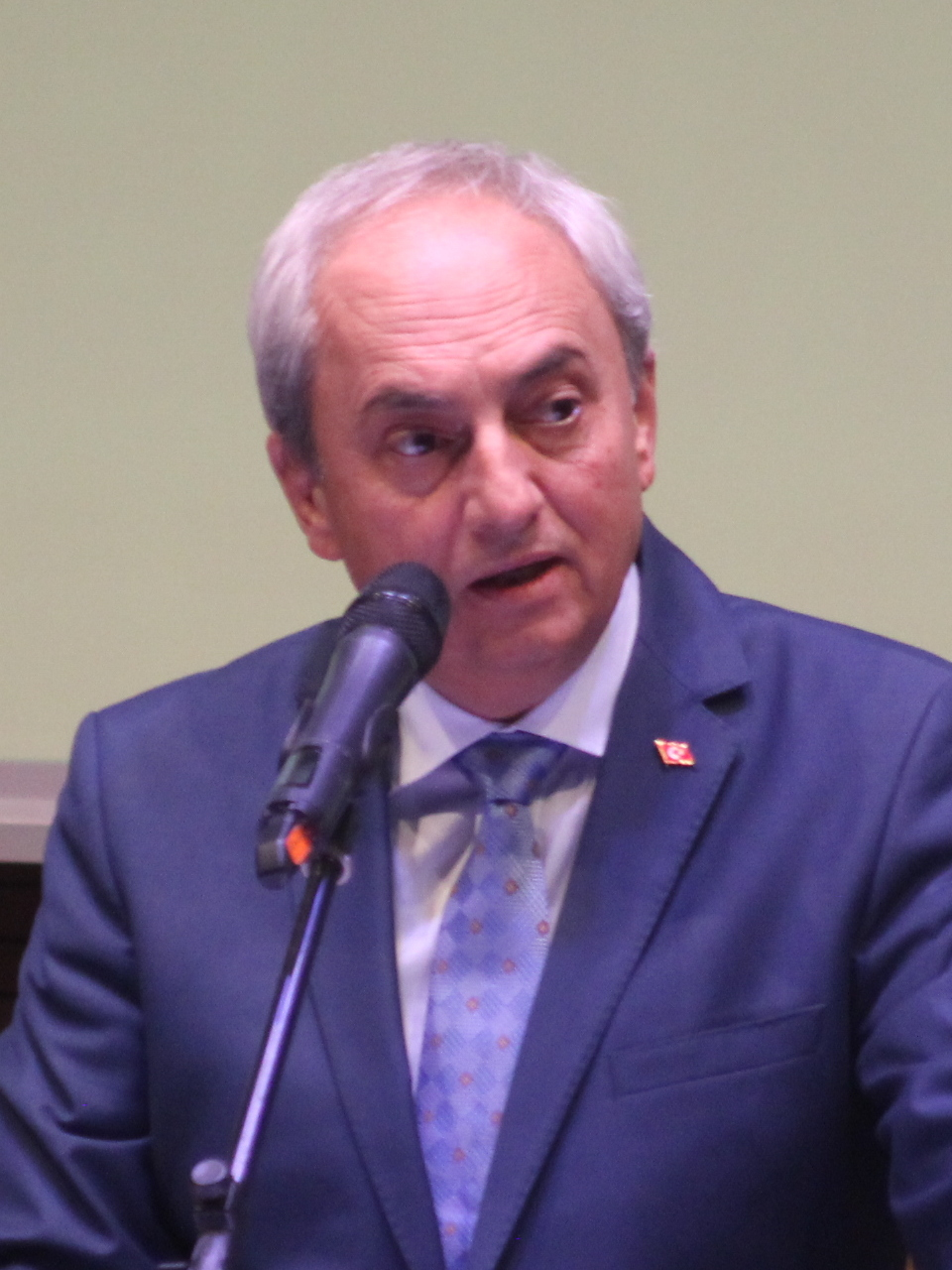
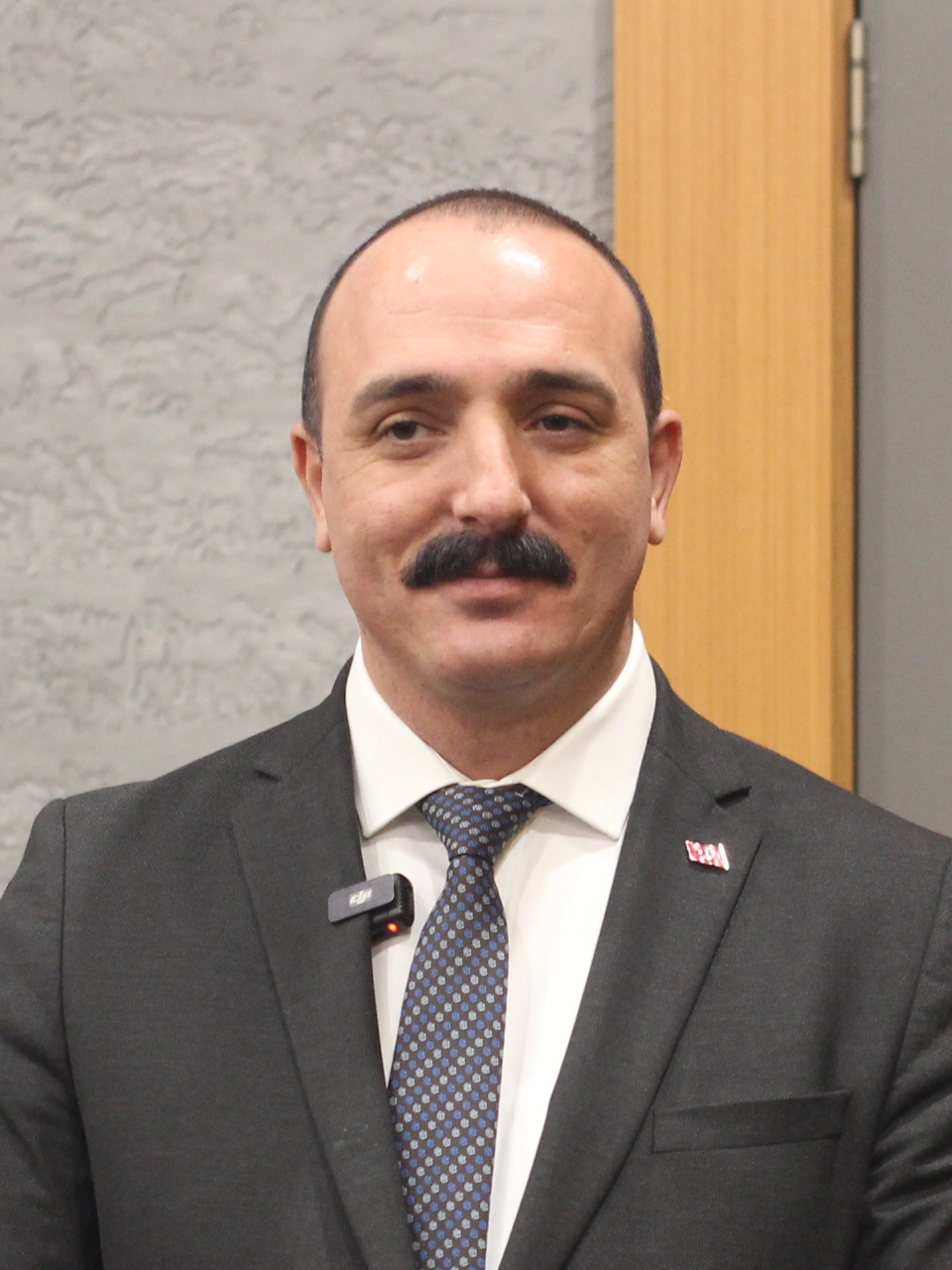
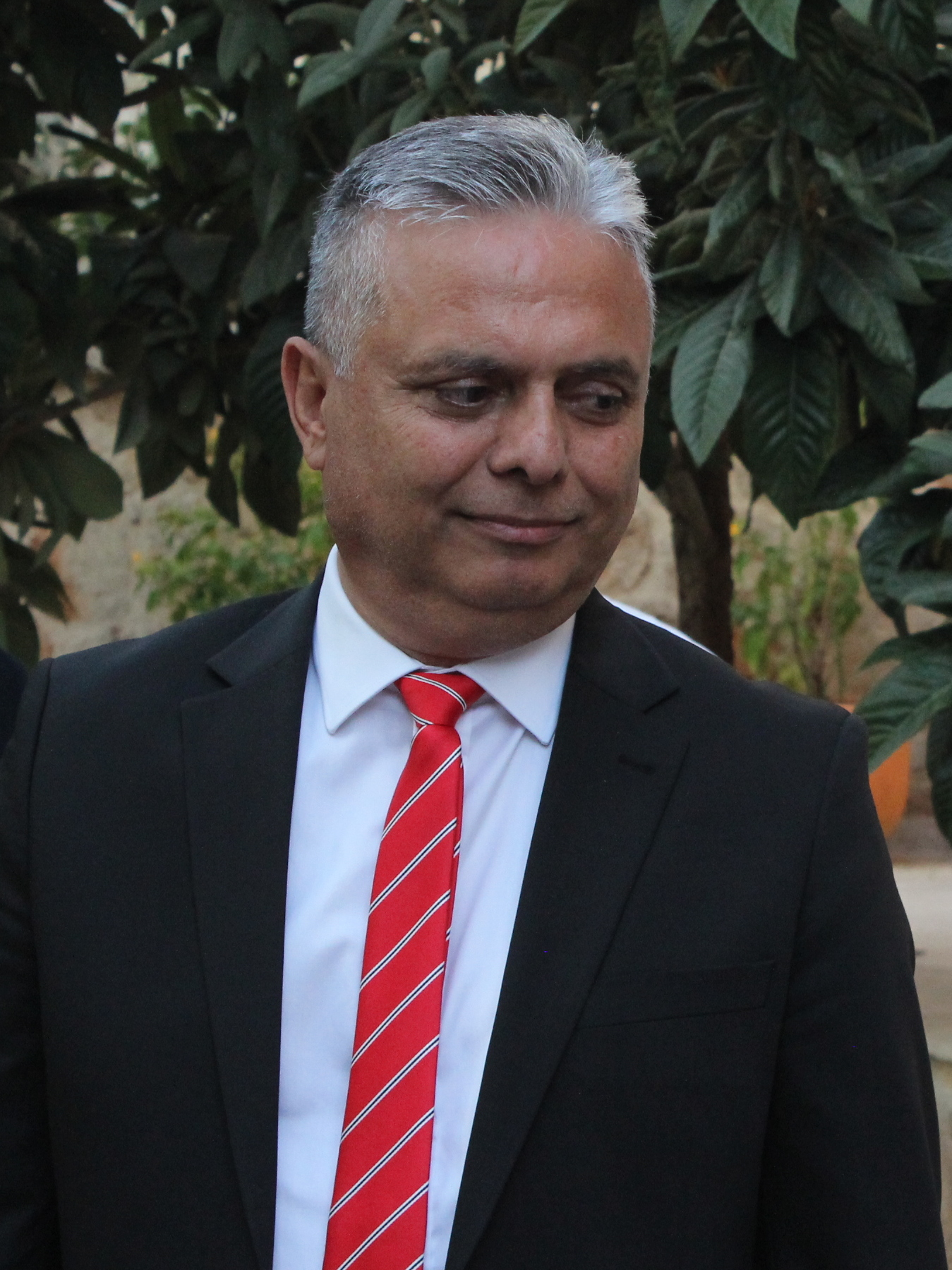
Mesut Kocagöz, Cem Kotan, and Ümit Uysal, mayors of core districts Kepez, Konyaaltı, and Muratpaşa respectively.

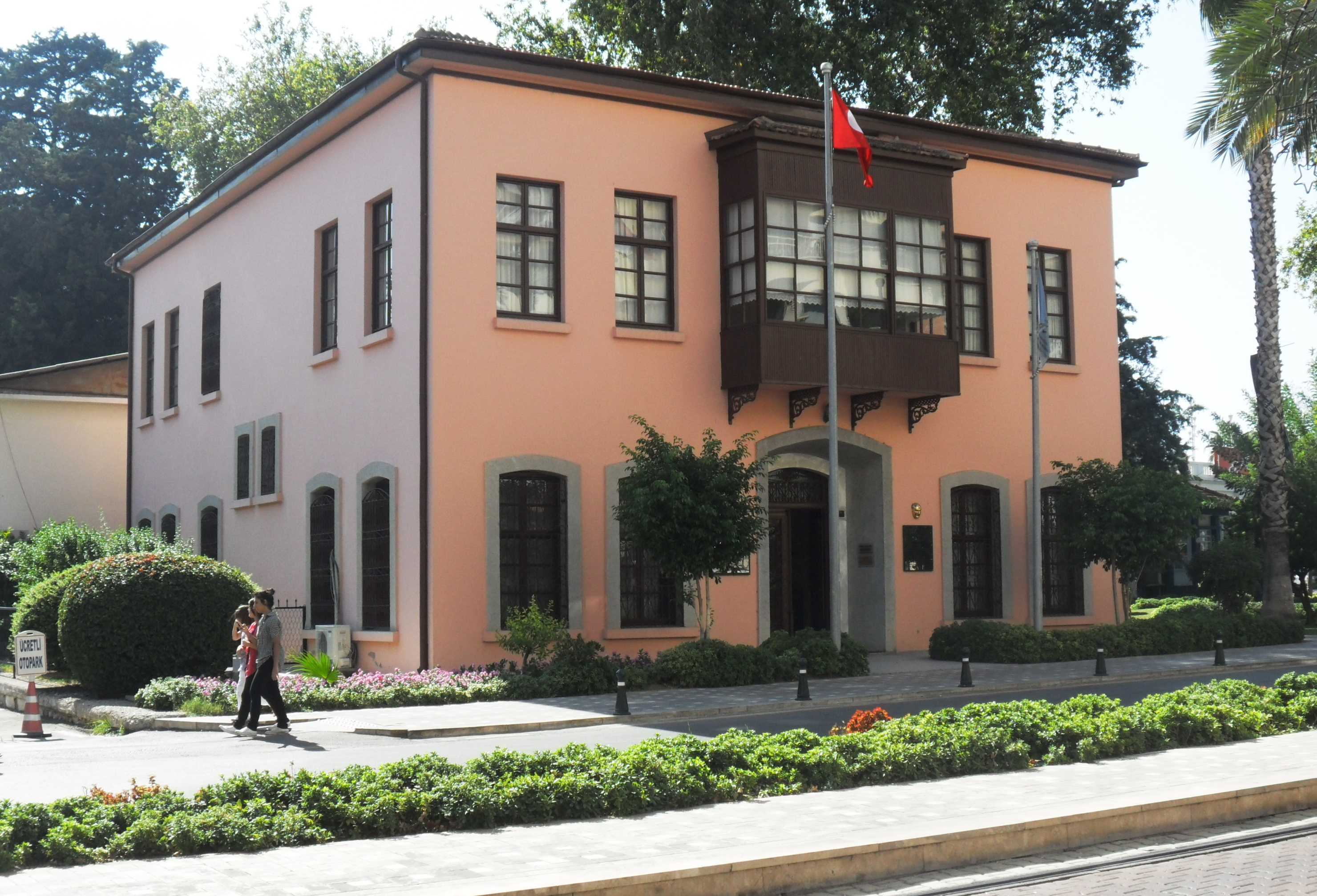
An old building of Atatürk's House Museum (Antalya)

Antalya has had a Metropolitan Municipality since 1993, with its borders being expanded multiple times until 2013, when it was given control of the whole province. In 2008, Antalya's central district was divided into five districts and some belde municipalities were abolished. As part of the 2013 Turkish local government reorganisation, all remaining belde municipalities in Antalya were abolished. The mayor of the Antalya Metropolitan Municipality is Muhittin Böcek of the CHP, in office since 2019. For general elections, Antalya elects 17 Members of Parliament to the Turkish Grand National Assembly as of February 2026.

=== Elections ===
Antalya has traditionally been seen as a stronghold for the Kemalist centre-left party Republican People's Party (CHP). Being the capital of the fifth most populous province in Turkey, Antalya is politically strategic and has been a target for the governing right-wing Justice and Development Party (AKP). The AKP unexpectedly won control of the Antalya Metropolitan Municipality in the 2004 local election. The AKP won a plurality in Antalya in the 2007 general election, symbolising the city's political transformation from a CHP stronghold to a CHP-AKP marginal battleground in the 21st century. The loss of Antalya was a major political setback for the CHP not only because of its significance as a centre for tourism, but also because the CHP's former leader Deniz Baykal is a Member of Parliament for the province. The province is divided into 19 districts.

The CHP regained control of the Metropolitan Municipality in the 2009 local elections, though the AKP won a plurality in the 2011 general election. The Nationalist Movement Party (MHP) also have a strong political base in Antalya, winning approximately between 15 and 25% of the vote in elections since 2007. The city voted in favour of the AKP government's proposed constitutional reforms in the 2007 referendum, but voted against the reforms proposed in 2010.

In the 2014 local elections, Antalya once again voted for the AKP, with the MHP taking support away from the CHP by winning a record 24.3% of the vote. The CHP subsequently accused the AKP of systematic electoral fraud, and the presence of government minister Mevlüt Çavuşoğlu at one of the vote counting centres drew strong condemnation. In the 2014 presidential election, the CHP and MHP's joint candidate Ekmeleddin İhsanoğlu won 53.08% of the vote. The AKP's candidate Recep Tayyip Erdoğan won 41.63% of the vote, and the HDP democratic socialist candidate Selahattin Demirtaş won 5.30% of the vote. Antalya was a hotspot for the 2013–14 anti-government protests against the AKP.

The secular main opposition, CHP, regained control of the Metropolitan Municipality in the 2019 local elections.

CHP won both the presidential election and the general election in 2023.

In 2024, CHP won 11 of the 14 non-central districts, all 5 of the central districts of Antalya, as well as the Metropolitan Municipality, solidifying the city as a CHP stronghold once again.

== Sports ==
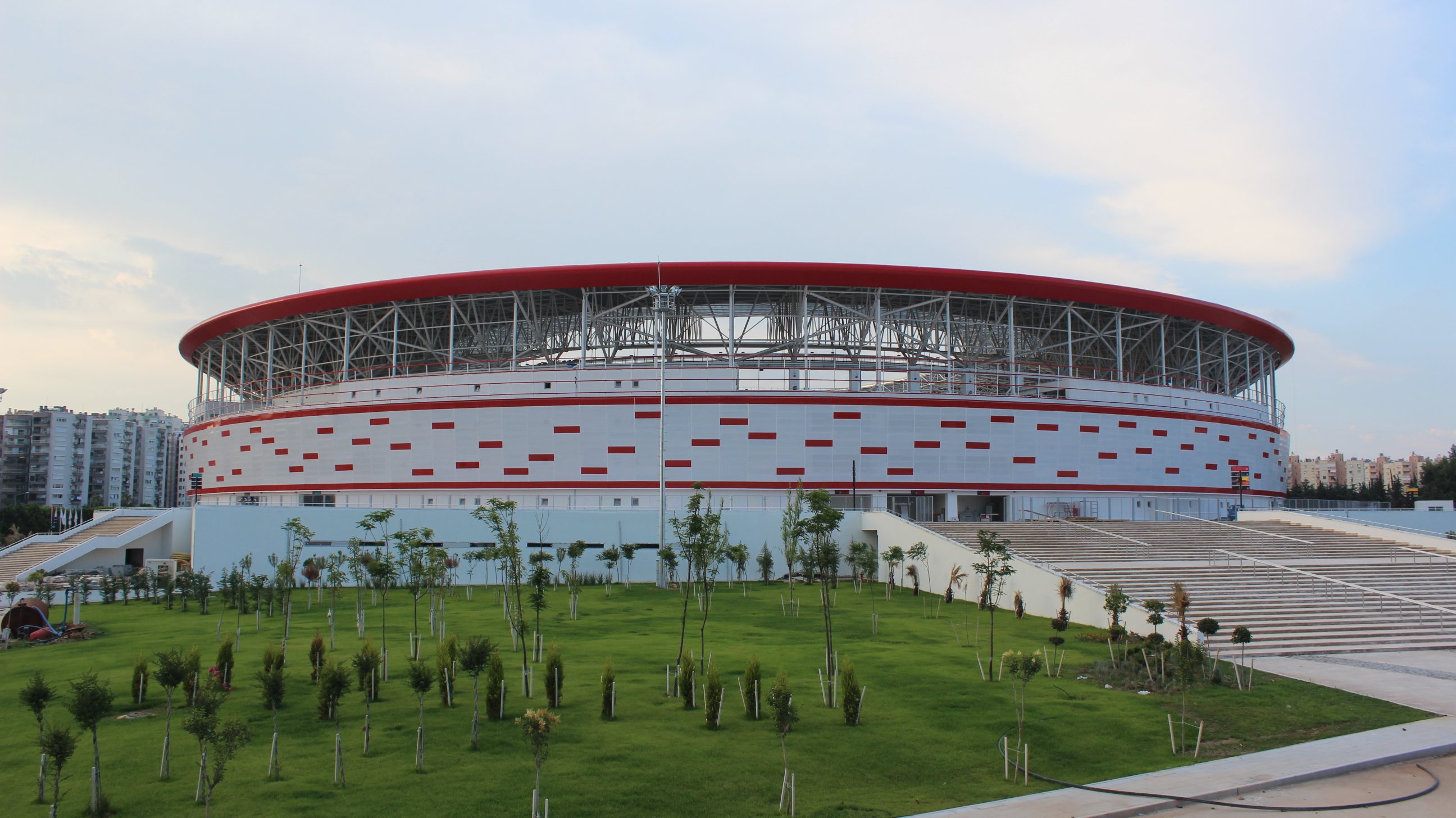
Antalya Stadium

The football club of Antalya, Antalyaspor plays in the Süper Lig. The team's home venue is Antalya Stadium, with a capacity of 33,000, which was opened in 2015. Another football venue in the city is Antalya Atatürk Stadium.

The city hosts a number of international sports competitions due to its longer lasting warm weather condition. Since 2006, one of the four stages of Archery World Cup events are held at the Antalya Centennial Archery Field. It also hosted European Weightlifting Championship in 2012, European Beach Volleyball Championship in 2003, European Triathlon Championship in 2013 and World Kickboxing Championships in 2013.

Since 2010, an international multiday trail running ultramarathon, called Lycian Way Ultramarathon, is held on the historical Lycian Way. The event runs eastward on a route of around 220–240 km (140–150 mi) from Ölüdeniz in Fethiye district of Muğla Province to Antalya in six days.

== Education ==
Akdeniz University enrolls over 60,000 students and 4,000 academic and administrative staff. Antalya Science University enrolls over 8,000 students and 300 academic and administrative staff.

== Culture ==
=== Cuisine ===
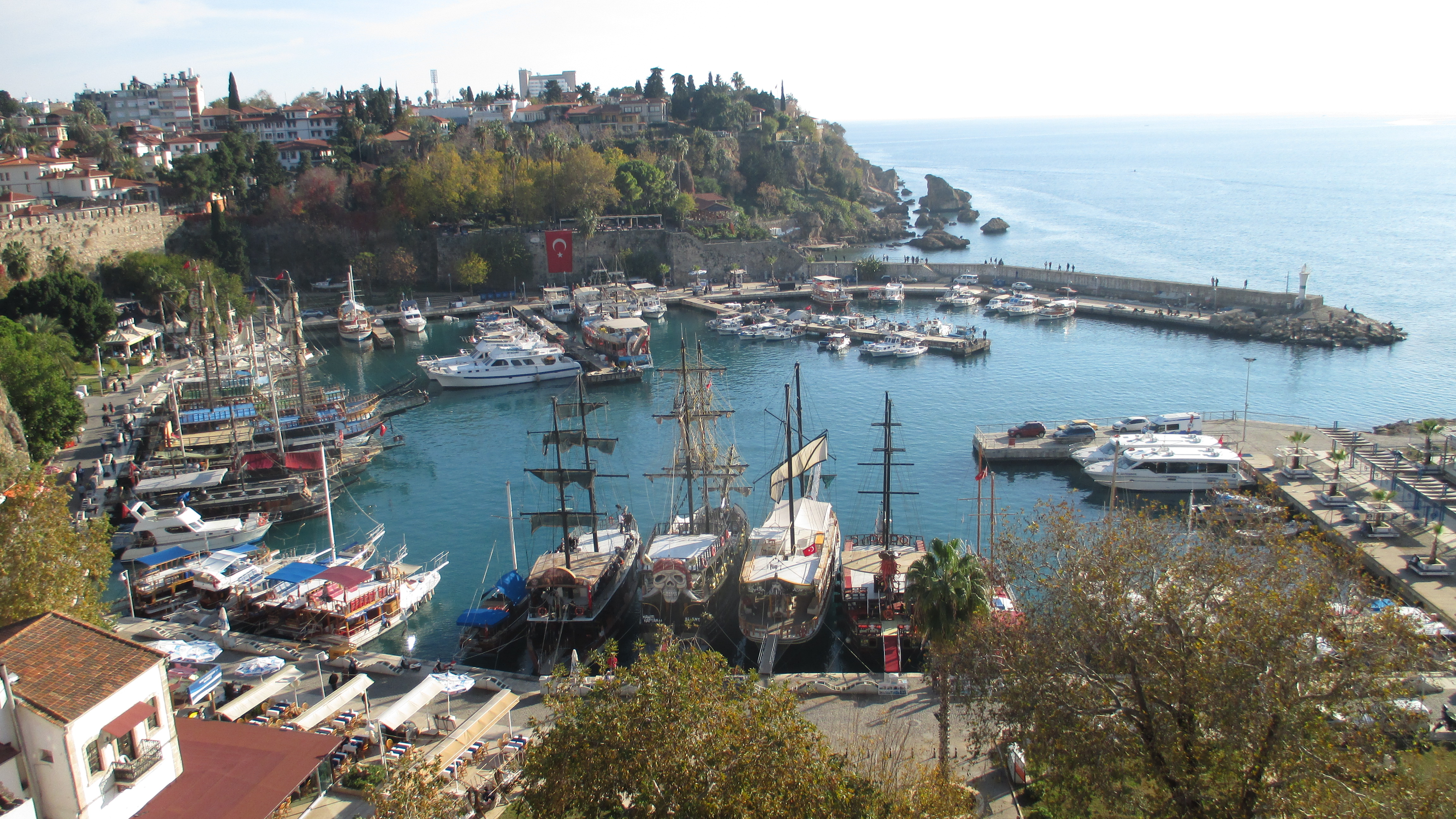
Scene around Kaleiçi, the old city center

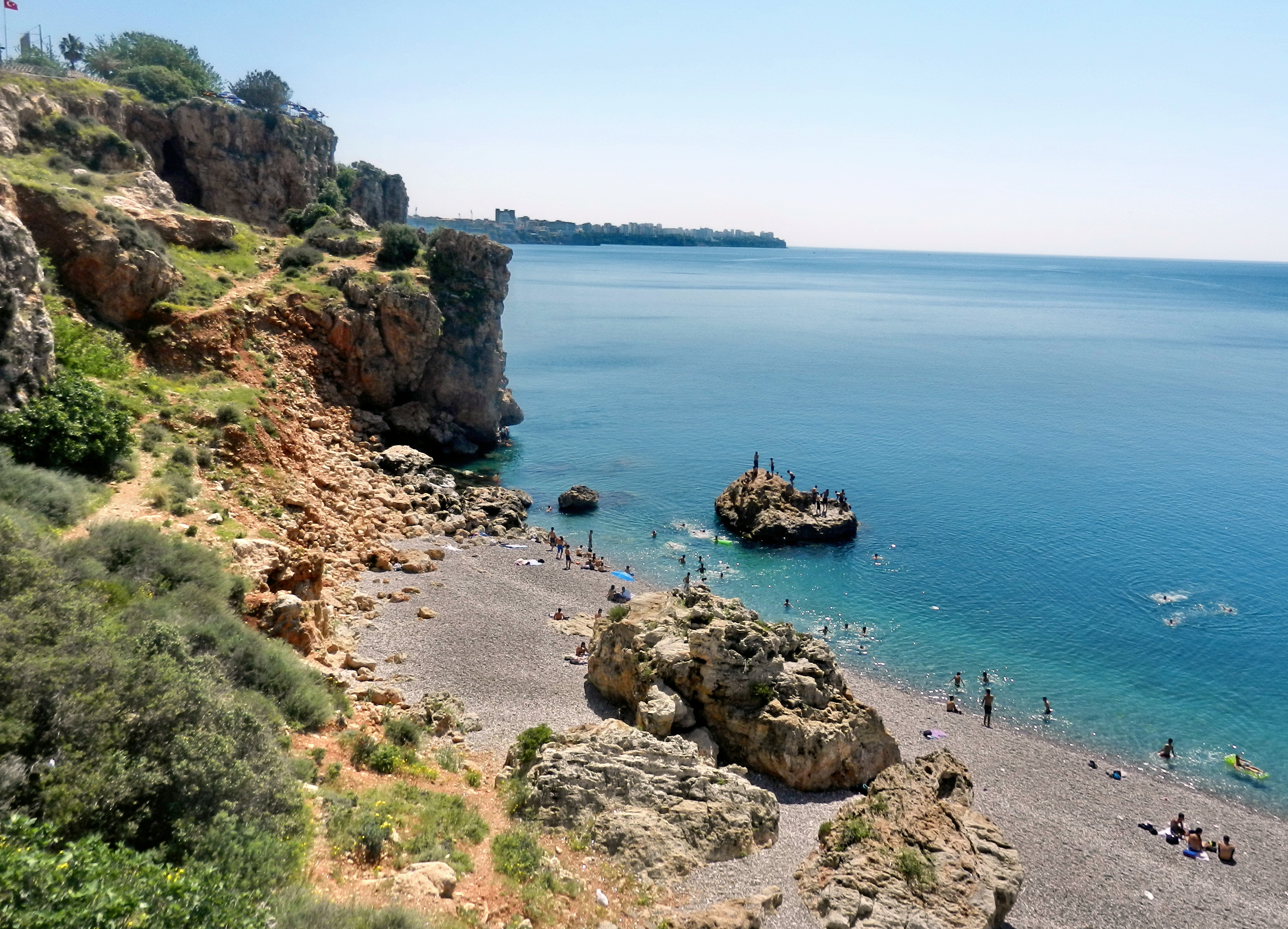
A view of Antalya's coastline

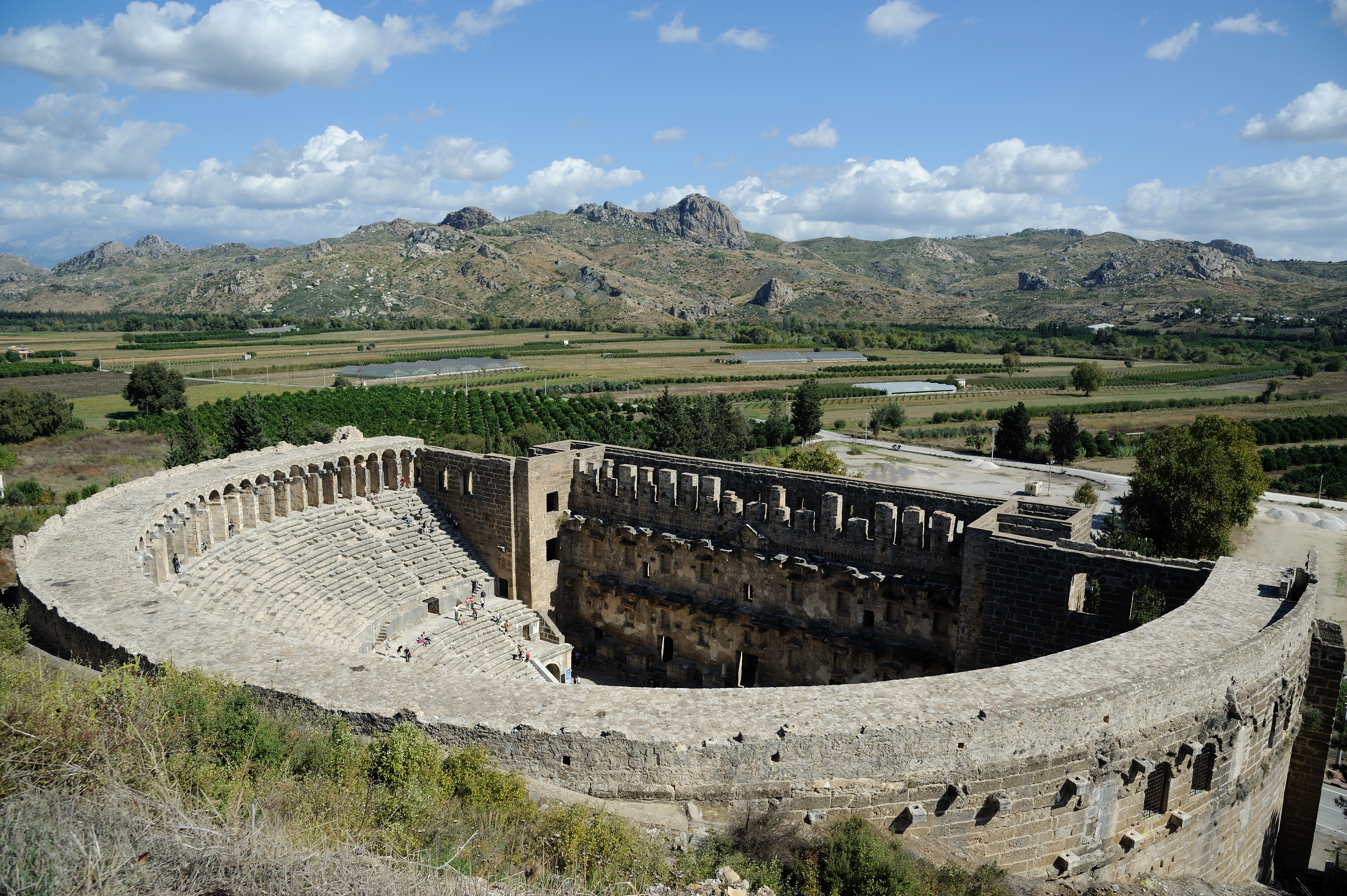
The Roman Theatre of Aspendos is one of the best preserved Roman theatres in the world.

Antalya's signature cuisine includes Piyaz (made with tahini, garlic, walnuts, and boiled beans), şiş köfte (spicy meatball which is cooked around a stick), spicy hibeş with mixed cumin and tahini, tandır kebap, domates civesi, şakşuka, and various cold Mediterranean dishes with olive oil.

Local specialties also include Bağaça (a traditional spiced tahini pastry), Yanıksı Dondurma (a distinctive burnt-milk ice cream), and tirmis (boiled seeds of the lupin, eaten as a snack). "Grida" (also known as Lagos or Mediterranean white grouper) is a fish common in local dishes.

=== Festivals and events ===
- Antalya Golden Orange Film Festival: national film festival usually held in September / October.
- Kaleiçi Old Town Festival, organized by Muratpaşa municipality, held in October.
- Sandland, sand art festival at Lara Beach

=== Museums ===
- Antalya Ethnographic Museum: Located in Kaleici housing artifacts of Antalya's culture, Regional dress, and architectural examples.
- Antalya Museum: Under reconstruction as of autumn 2025.
- Antalya Toy Museum: The Antalya Metropolitan Municipality opened the exhibition facility in 2011.
- Atatürk's House Museum
- Various museums in Dokumapark;
  - Bir Zamanlar Antalya Müzesi: Serving artifacts and documents about contemporary urban history of Antalya.
  - Kepez Vehicle Museum: Serving historical vehicles in contemporary history.
  - Kepez Open Air Museum: Serving scale models of various structures of Turkey. The models were located in Minicity park in Konyaaltı before the demolition of park in late 2010's and moving to current location.
- Mevlevihane Museum: Former dervish lodge with Sufi and Islamic cultural artifacts.
- Suna & İnan Kıraç Kaleiçi Museum: An ethnographic museum run by the Suna and İnan Kıraç Foundation. Opened in 2007 by the Mediterranean Civilizations Research Center (Akdeniz Medeniyetleri Araştırma Merkezi)

== Transportation ==
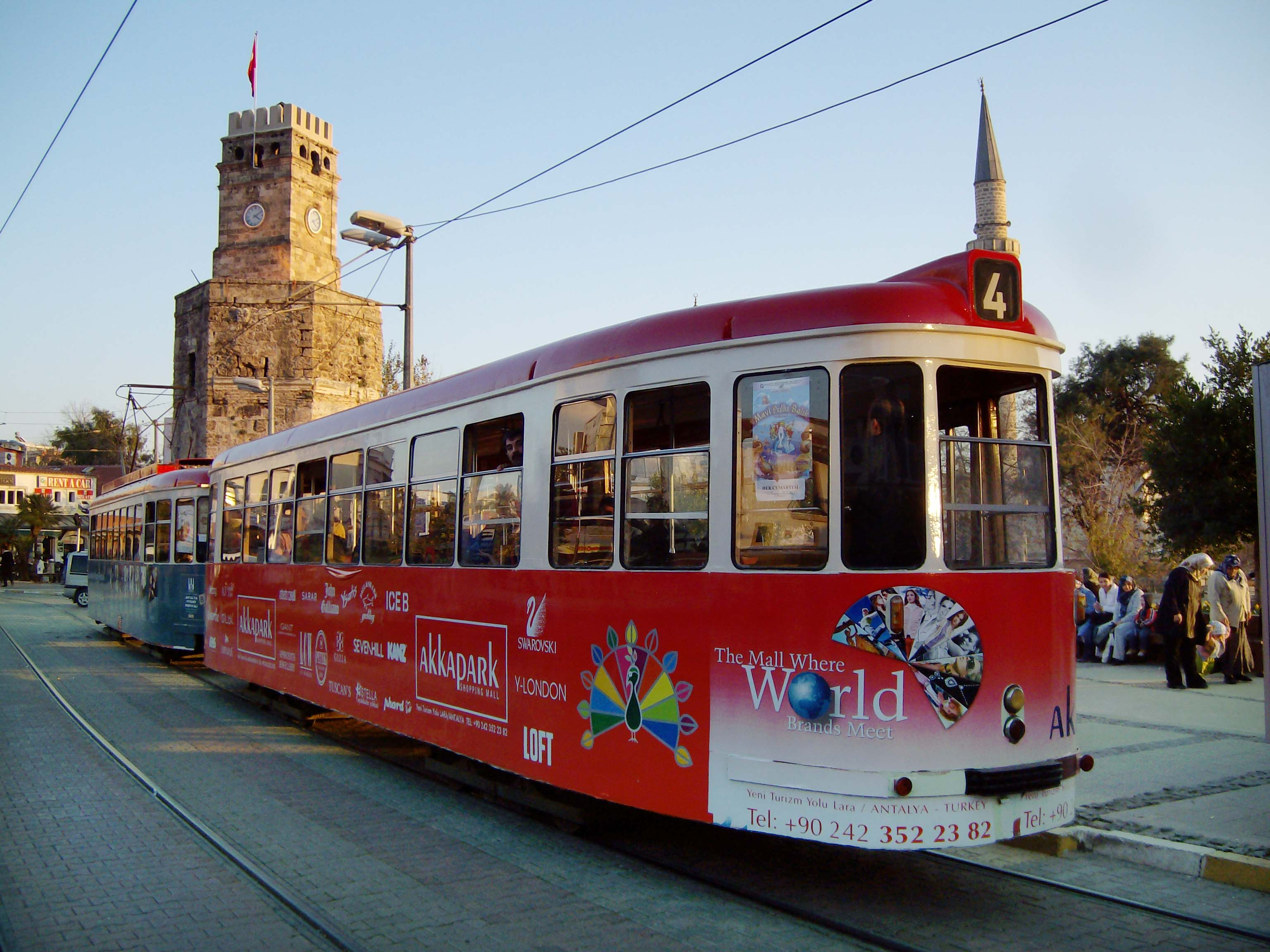
Antalya Nostalgic Trams

The main transportation to the city is by air and land. Sea routes are still under development. In 2007, the airport added a new terminal. The city has a main port at the south of the Konyaaltı.

Road transport in the city is estimated by Climate Trace to have emitted over a million tonnes of carbon dioxide in 2023.

=== Buses ===
There is a network of look-alike Dolmuşes that are privately owned and operated minibuses, under municipal government control.

Antalya Ulaşım, a municipally owned corporation, runs the public bus system. The corporation owns Antobus and Antray. Antobus was started in September 2010. In 2010, the city planned to increase from 40 to 140 more buses.

Payment for public transportation was made in cash until the launch of a public transportation card, Antkart, in late 2007. The card system met with criticism and was subsequently canceled in June 2009, returning to a cash system. Halkkart has been used for the transportation system since the summer of 2010. Halkkart is managed by A-Kent Smart City Technologies under the control of Antalya Metropolitan Municipal government. Passengers can use identified cards to take buses or trams.

=== Light Rail ===
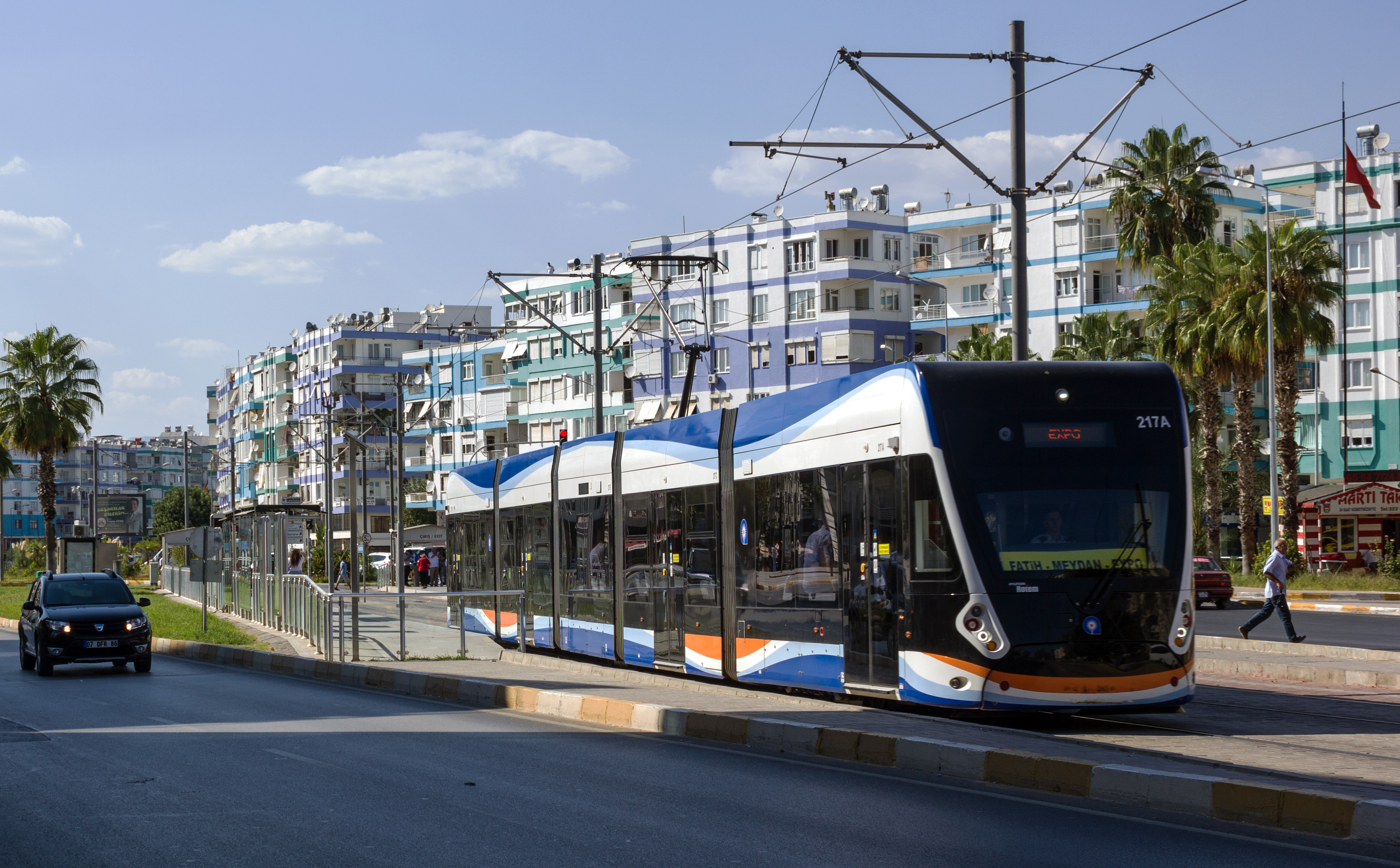
The Antray Light Rail

Transportation lines of tram system

A tram system, opened in 1999, runs from Antalya Museum, and the Sheraton Voyager and Falez hotels, along the main boulevard through the city center at Kalekapisi, Hadrian's Gate, Karaalioglu Park, and ending at Talya Oteli. Trams depart on the hour and half-hour from the terminal (east and west), and reach Kalekapisi between 10 and 15 minutes later.

In December 2009, an 11.1-kilometre (6.9 mi) light rail line Antray was opened from one of the main city public bus hubs northwest to beyond suburban areas and the zoo. An extension to Airport, Aksu and Expo 2016 site was completed in 2016.

=== Major routes ===
Antalya is the southern terminus of European route E87, which connects to Korkuteli, Denizli, İzmir, Çanakkale, Edirne in Turkey, along with Varna in Bulgaria, Constanta in Romania and Odesa in Ukraine. Antalya is also the terminus of Turkish Highway D650, which connects Burdur, Afyon, Kütahya, and Sakarya.

D400 connects with D650 in Antalya, while D650 alternative D685 connects to Isparta and provincial road 07-50 connects to Kumluca by Altınyaka, an alternative to D400.

=== Airport ===
Antalya Airport has two international terminals and one domestic terminal. In 2020, its number of passengers on international flights surpassed the total number at Istanbul Airport and Sabiha Gökçen International Airport for the first time, officially earning the title of "the capital of Turkish tourism".

== International relations ==
Antalya is twinned with:

- Austin, United States
- Famagusta, Northern Cyprus
- Haikou, China
- Jeonju, South Korea
- Kazan, Russia
- Kunming, China
- Liwan (Guangzhou), China
- Miami, United States
- Mostar, Bosnia and Herzegovina
- Nuremberg, Germany
- Omsk, Russia
- Qingdao, China
- Rostov-on-Don, Russia
- Seville, Spain
- Suncheon, South Korea
- Taldykorgan, Kazakhstan
- Ürümqi, China
- Vladimir, Russia
- Xining, China
- Yalta, Ukraine

== Notable people ==
- Tarık Akıltopu, architect, historian, poet, writer
- Cafercan Aksu, football player
- Athenaeus of Attalia, physician and founder of the Pneumatist School of Medicine, 1st century AD
- Michael Attaliates, Byzantine lawyer of the 11th century
- Attalus II Philadelphus, King of Pergamon and the founder of Attalia
- Deniz Baykal, former leader of Republican People's Party
- Yağmur Sarıgül, musician, composer of maNga
- Ahmet Sendil, music producer, remixer and DJ
- Ahmet Sonuç, video game streamer known as Jahrein
- Musa Uzunlar, actor
- Burak Yılmaz, football player
- Levent Yüksel, musician, composer
