= Muratpaşa =

- District and municipality
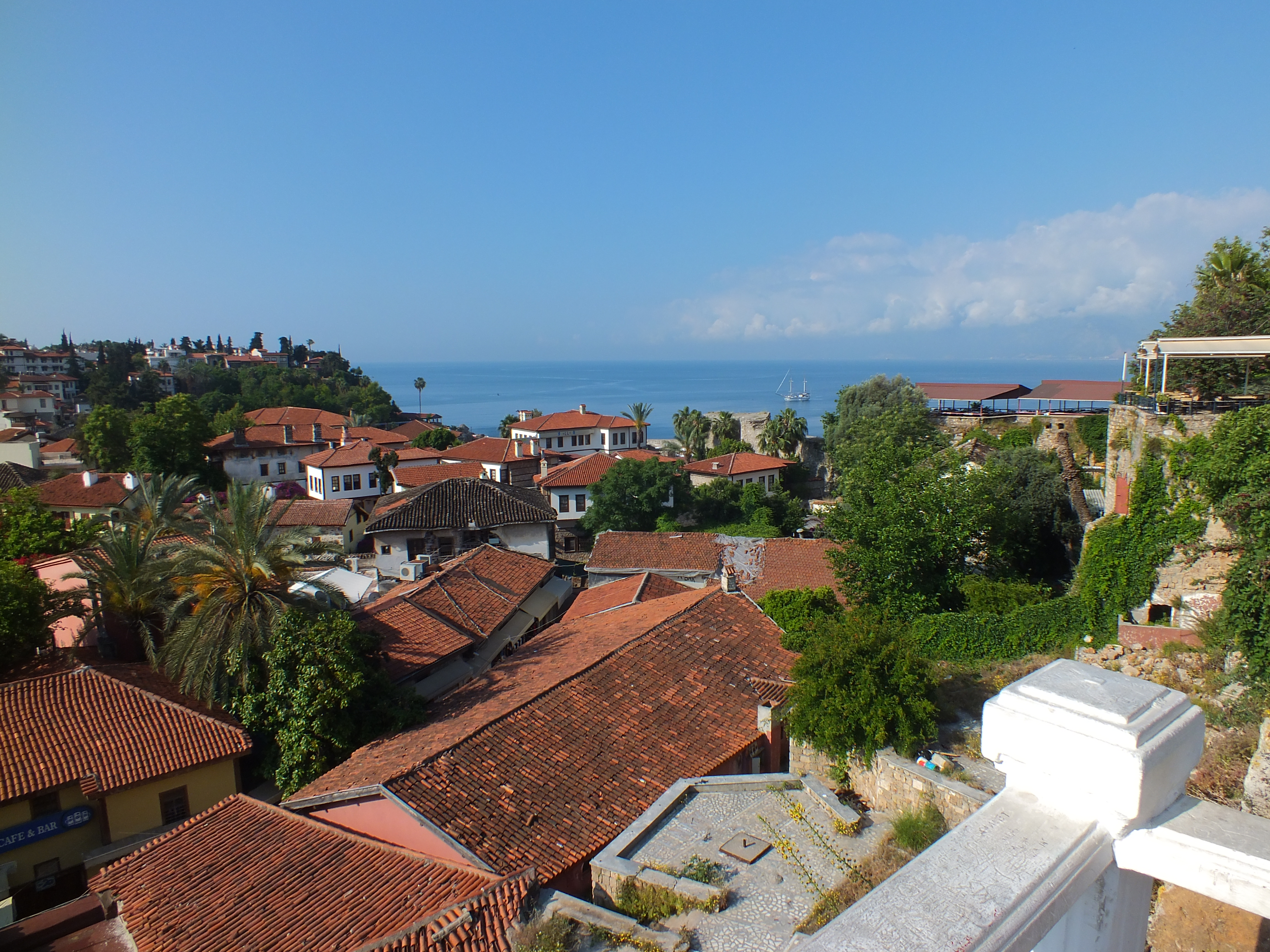
- Kaleiçi (Old Town) in Muratpaşa, Antalya

- Logo

- Map showing Muratpaşa District in Antalya Province

- Location within Turkey
- Coordinates: 36°52′57″N 30°46′09″E
- Country: Turkey
- Province: Antalya

Government
  - Mayor: Ümit Uysal (CHP)
  - Kaymakam: Orhan Burhan
- Area: 96 km^{2} (37 sq mi)
- Elevation: 39 m (128 ft)
- Population (2025): 510,887
  - Density: 5,300/km^{2} (14,000/sq mi)
- Time zone: UTC+3 (TRT)
- Postal code: 07010, 07030–07050, 07100, 07160, 07200, 07230, 07300–07310
- Area code: (+90) 242
- Website: www.muratpasa-bld.gov.tr

Muratpaşa is a municipality and district of Antalya Province, Turkey. Its area is 96 km^{2}, and its population is 510,887 (2025). The district covers part of the city centre of Antalya, and has a coastline of 20 km (12 mi). The Mediterranean Sea lies to the south of the district. Ümit Uysal is the mayor of Muratpaşa.

== History ==
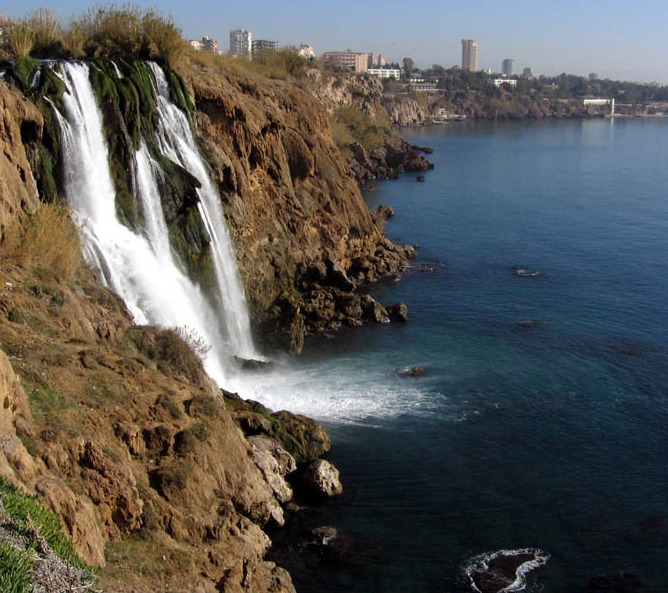
Lower Düden Waterfall in Muratpaşa, Antalya

Modern day district of Muratpaşa is home to Kaleiçi, the historic center founded by Attalus II, King of Pergamon around 150 BC. Since then, the district has been under Lydian, Roman, Persian, Byzantine, Seljuk, Cypriot, Teke, Ottoman, and —after the Italian occupation— Turkish rule.

== Population ==
Historical population
Year	Pop.	±% p.a.
2007	367,029	—
2008	377,857	+2.95%
2009	396,906	+5.04%
2010	416,576	+4.96%
2011	431,348	+3.55%
2012	442,663	+2.62%
2013	453,255	+2.39%
2014	465,927	+2.80%
2015	477,290	+2.44%
2016	486,408	+1.91%
2017	488,670	+0.47%
2018	495,688	+1.44%
2019	510,368	+2.96%
2020	513,035	+0.52%
2021	521,183	+1.59%
2022	526,293	+0.98%
2023	512,700	−2.58%
2024	509,444	−0.64%
2025	510,887	+0.28%
Source: TÜİK

== Politics ==
=== Mayors ===
No.	Mayor	Took office	Left office	Political party
1	Mehmet Manavoğlu	1994	1999	True Path Party
2	Süleyman Evcilmen	1999	2014	Democratic Left Party (1999–2004)
2	Süleyman Evcilmen	1999	2014	Republican People's Party (2004–2014)
3	Ümit Uysal	2014	Incumbent	Republican People's Party

== Composition ==
There are 55 neighbourhoods in Muratpaşa District:

- Altındağ
- Bahçelievler
- Balbey
- Barbaros
- Bayındır
- Çağlayan
- Çaybaşı
- Cumhuriyet
- Demircikara
- Deniz
- Doğuyaka
- Dutlubahçe
- Elmalı
- Ermenek
- Etiler
- Fener
- Gebizli
- Gençlik
- Güvenlik
- Güzelbağ
- Güzeloba
- Güzeloluk
- Haşimişcan
- Kılıçarslan
- Kırcami
- Kışla
- Kızılarık
- Kızılsaray
- Kızıltoprak
- Konuksever
- Mehmetçik
- Meltem
- Memurevleri
- Meydankavağı
- Muratpaşa
- Sedir
- Selçuk
- Sinan
- Şirinyalı
- Soğuksu
- Tahılpazarı
- Tarım
- Topçular
- Tuzcular
- Üçgen
- Varlık
- Yenigöl
- Yenigün
- Yeşilbahçe
- Yeşildere
- Yeşilova
- Yıldız
- Yüksekalan
- Zerdalilik
- Zümrütova

== Landmarks ==
The Muratpaşa District in Antalya has many places to visit

- Hadrian's Gate (Üçkapılar)
- Kaleiçi (Old Town)
- Antalya Archeological Museum
- Düden Waterfalls
- Atatürk's House Museum
- Antalya Marina
- Karaalioğlu Park
- Yivli Minaret Mosque
- Hidirlik Tower
- TerraCity Shopping Mall
- MarkAntalya Shopping Mall

== See also ==
- Muratpaşa Belediyesi Spor Kulübü, the local sports club
