= Spiral minaret =

Mosques with a spiral minaret include:

- Great Mosque of Samarra, or Al-Malwiya Mosque (جامع الملوية 'Mosque of the Spiral one'), in Iraq
- Burmalı Mosque, (Burmalı Minare Camii 'Mosque with the Spiral Minaret'), in Saraçhane park, Istanbul, Turkey
- Burmali Minare Mosque, in Amasya, Turkey
- Abdulla Bin Zaid Al Mahmoud Islamic Cultural Center, in Doha, Qatar
- Abu Dulaf Mosque, north of Samarra, Iraq

== See also ==
- Minar (Firuzabad), a tower-like structure in Gōr (modern Firuzabad, Iran)
