= Kaleiçi =

Historic city center of Antalya, Turkey

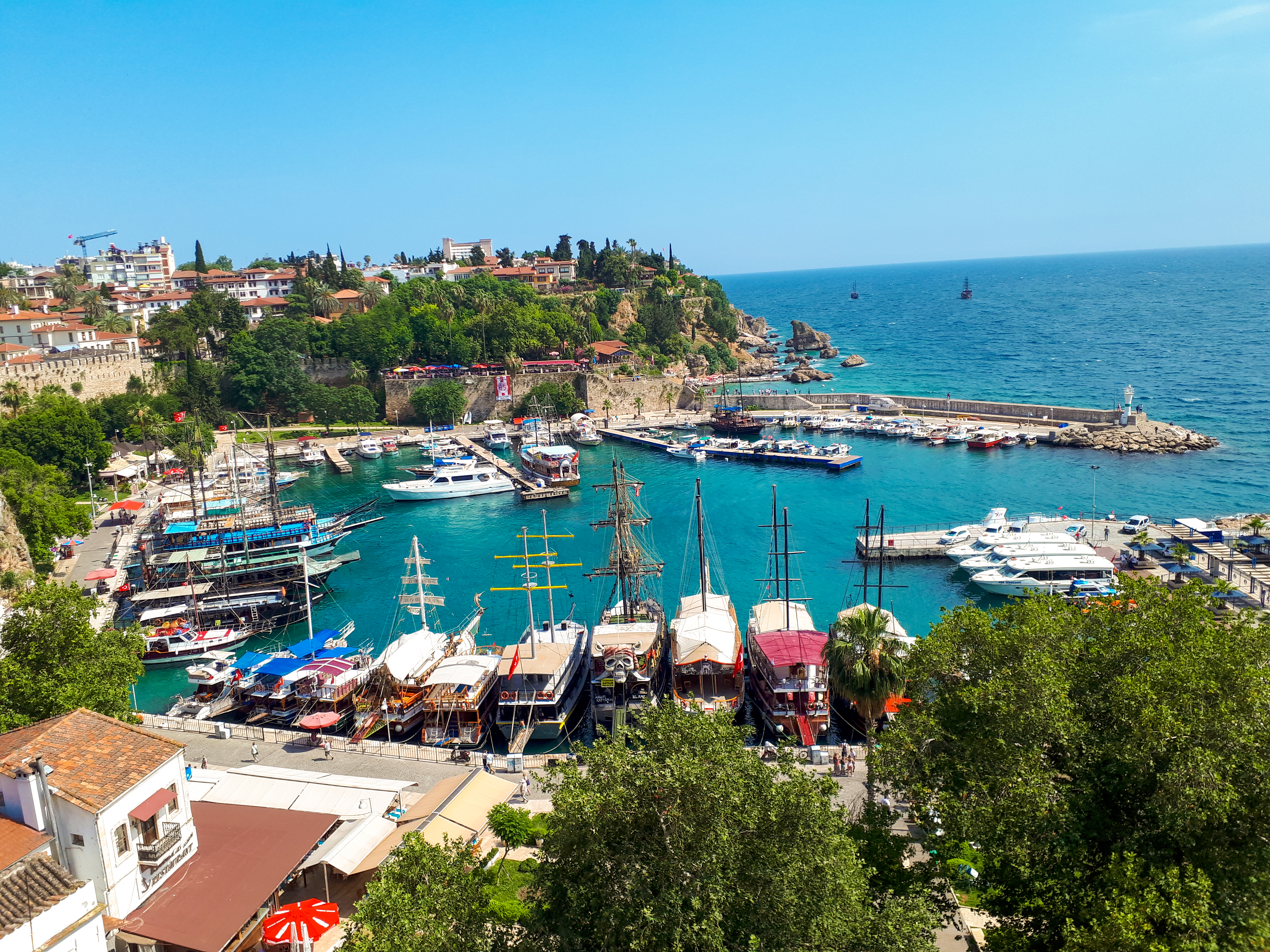
The old harbor of Kaleiçi

Kaleiçi is the historic city center of Antalya, located along the Mediterranean coast in southern Turkey. Enclosed by ancient city walls and overlooking the old harbor, it represents the original core of the city.

The area showcases the architectural and cultural influences of the Roman, Byzantine, Seljuk, and Ottoman periods. Known for its narrow cobblestone streets, red-tiled Ottoman-era houses, and historical landmarks, Kaleiçi today is both a residential neighborhood and a major attraction for those interested in Antalya's rich heritage.

== History ==
The area now known as Kaleiçi (literally "Inner Castle") was once part of the ancient city of Attaleia, founded in the 2nd century BCE by Attalus II Philadelphus. After the Pergamon Kingdom collapsed in 133 BCE, the city briefly remained independent before falling into the hands of pirates. In 77 BCE, it was incorporated into the Roman Republic by the general Servilius Isauricus and later served as a naval base for Pompey in 67 BCE. The Roman Emperor Hadrian visited the city in 130 CE, which contributed to its urban and architectural development under Roman rule.

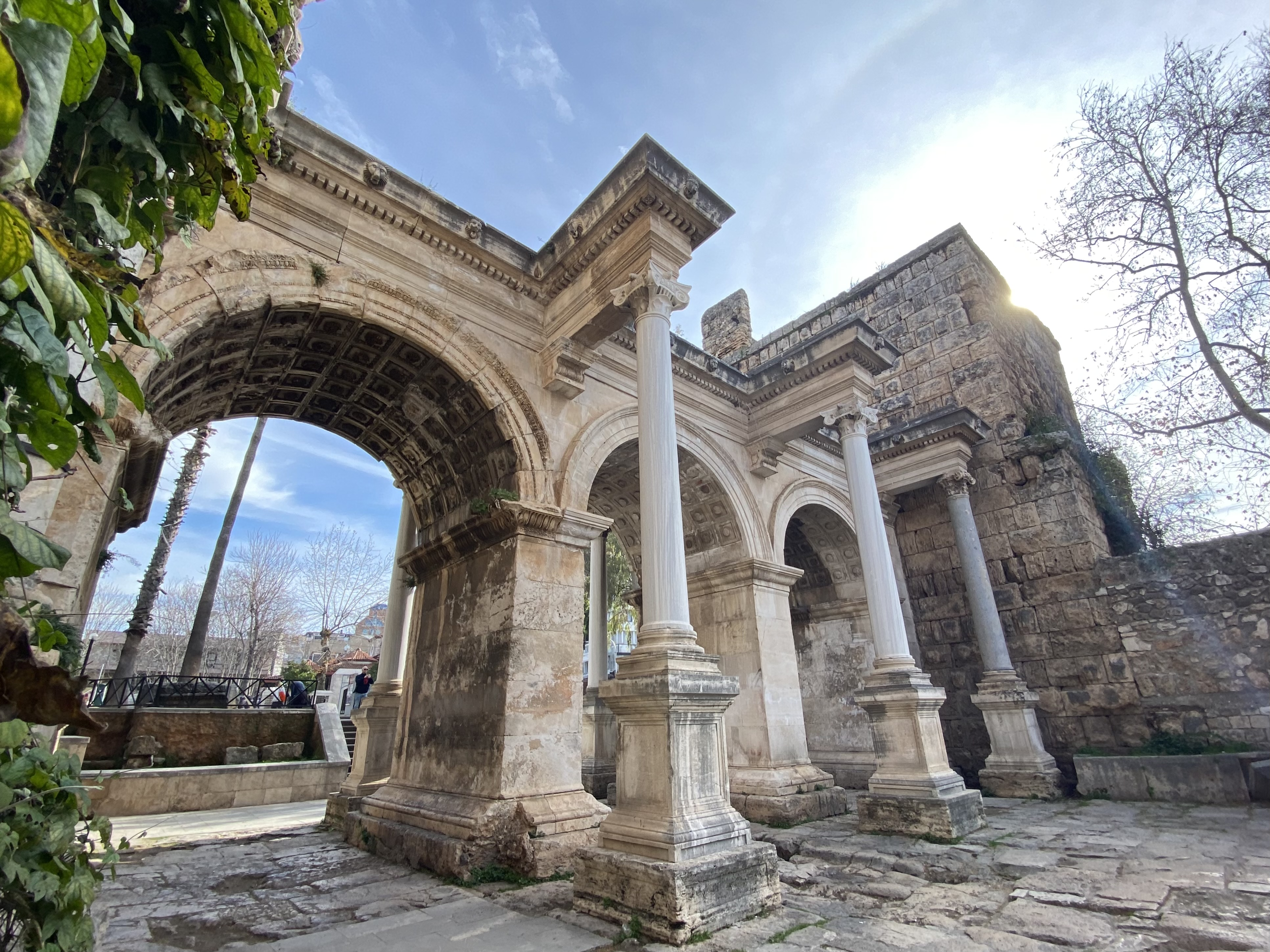
Hadrian's Gate, an Ancient Roman gate built to honor Emperor Hadrian

During the Byzantine period, Attaleia became a bishopric center and retained strategic and religious significance. Following the Seljuks conquest, the settlement continued to flourish. Since modern Antalya was built directly atop the ancient city, few structures from antiquity remain visible today. Among the surviving remnants are parts of the ancient harbor breakwater and surrounding fortifications. One of the most notable monuments is Hadrian’s Gate (Üçkapılar), a Roman-era structure marking one of the main entrances into the old city.

Kaleiçi is surrounded by a double ring of walls, forming a horseshoe-shaped layout that reflects architectural influences from the Hellenistic, Roman, Byzantine, Seljuks, and Ottoman periods. The district contains approximately 3,000 traditional houses with red-tiled roofs, offering a glimpse into the daily life and architectural character of past centuries. Narrow alleys run uphill from the harbor, following the contours of the inner fortifications. Notable landmarks within Kaleiçi include the Yivli Minaret, Hidirlik Tower, Kesik Minare, İskele Mosque, and Tekeli Mehmet Paşa Mosque. The ancient harbor, now a modern yacht marina, continues to be a focal point of the area. Kaleiçi’s scenic setting has long inspired writers and artists, and in 1984, the Turkish Ministry of Culture and Tourism received the Golden Apple Award (Pomme d’Or) from FIJET for its preservation and restoration efforts in the district.

== Gallery ==
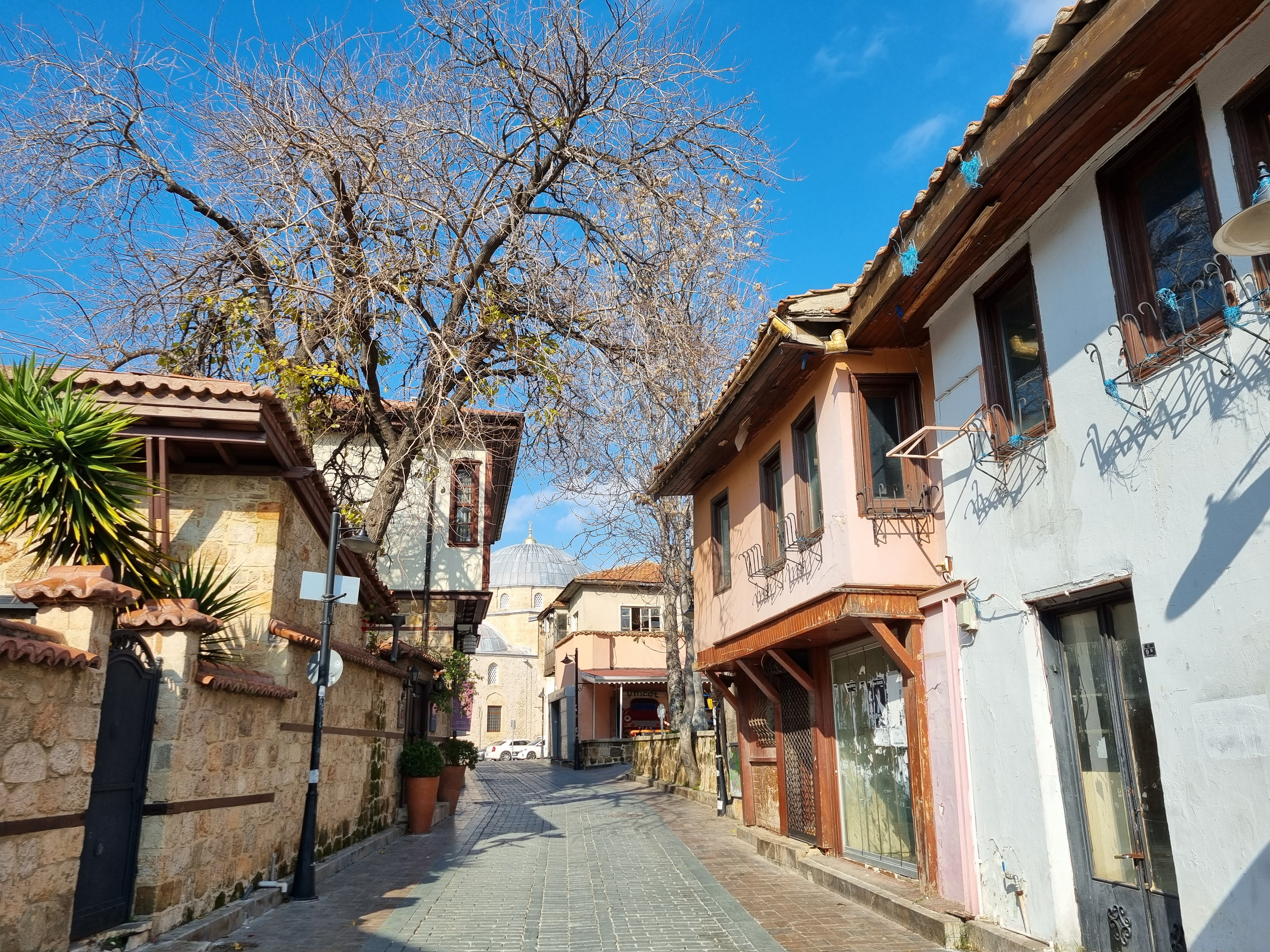
Historical houses in the town

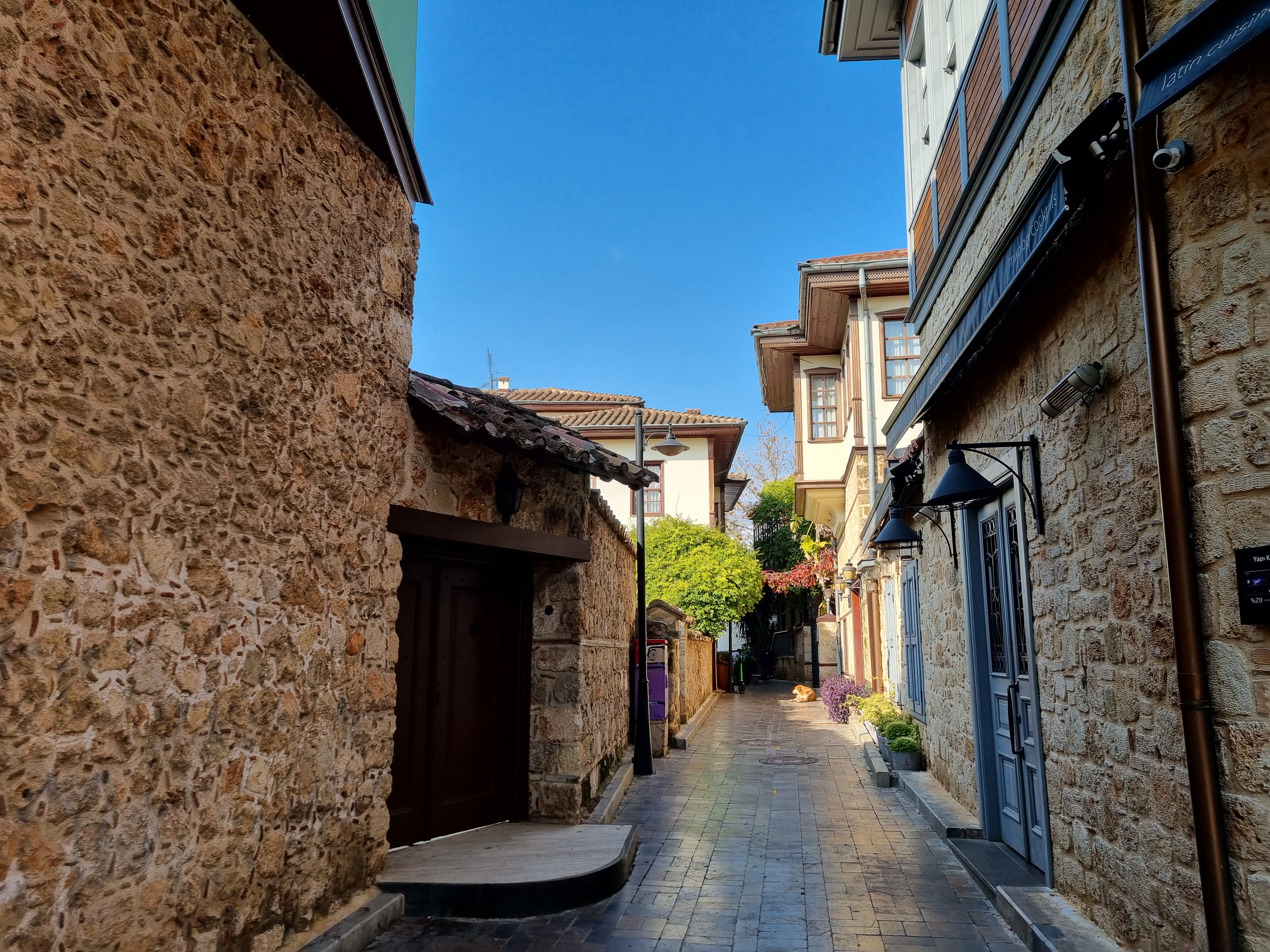
A narrow street in Kaleiçi

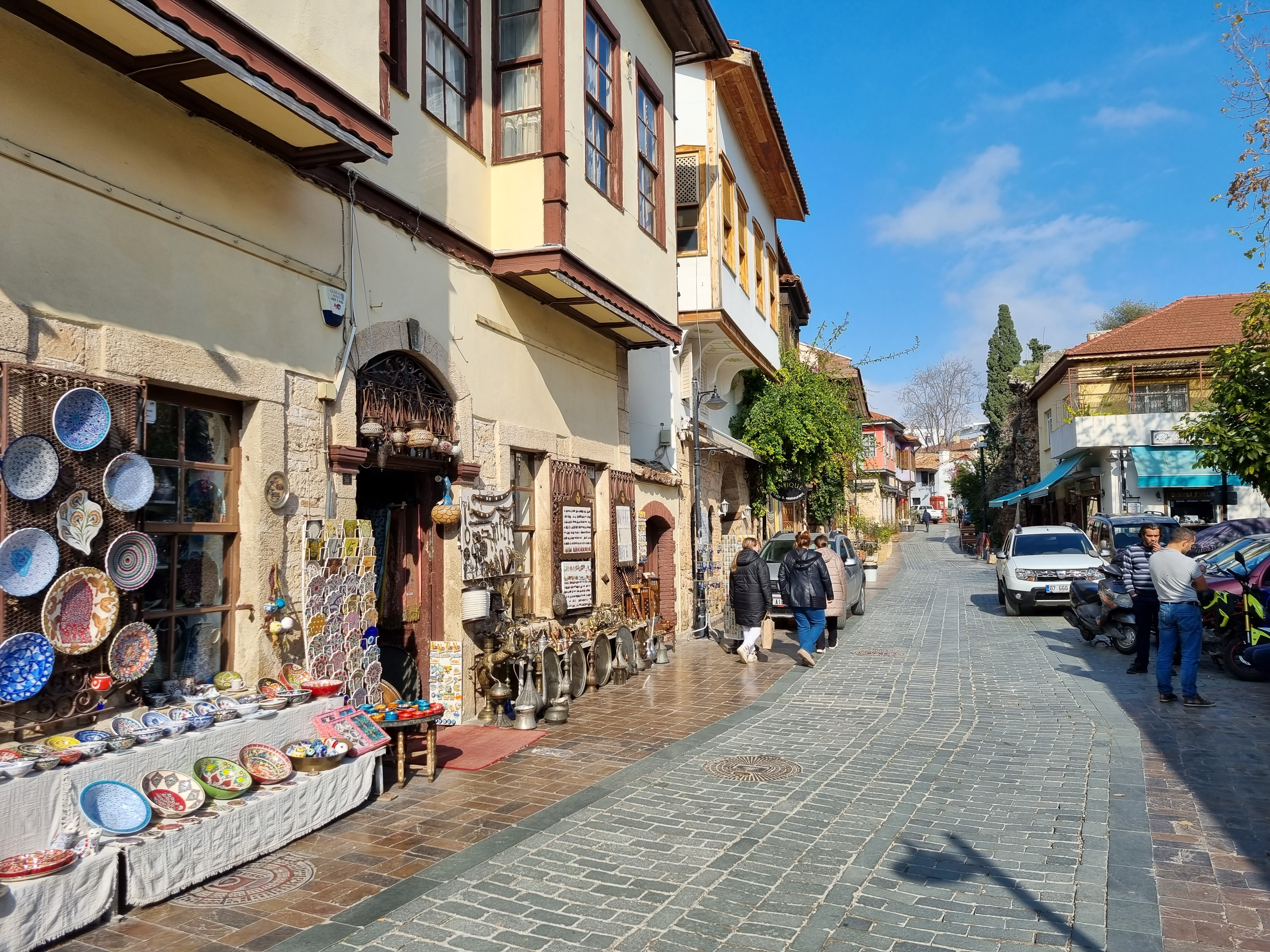
Traditional houses and a shop

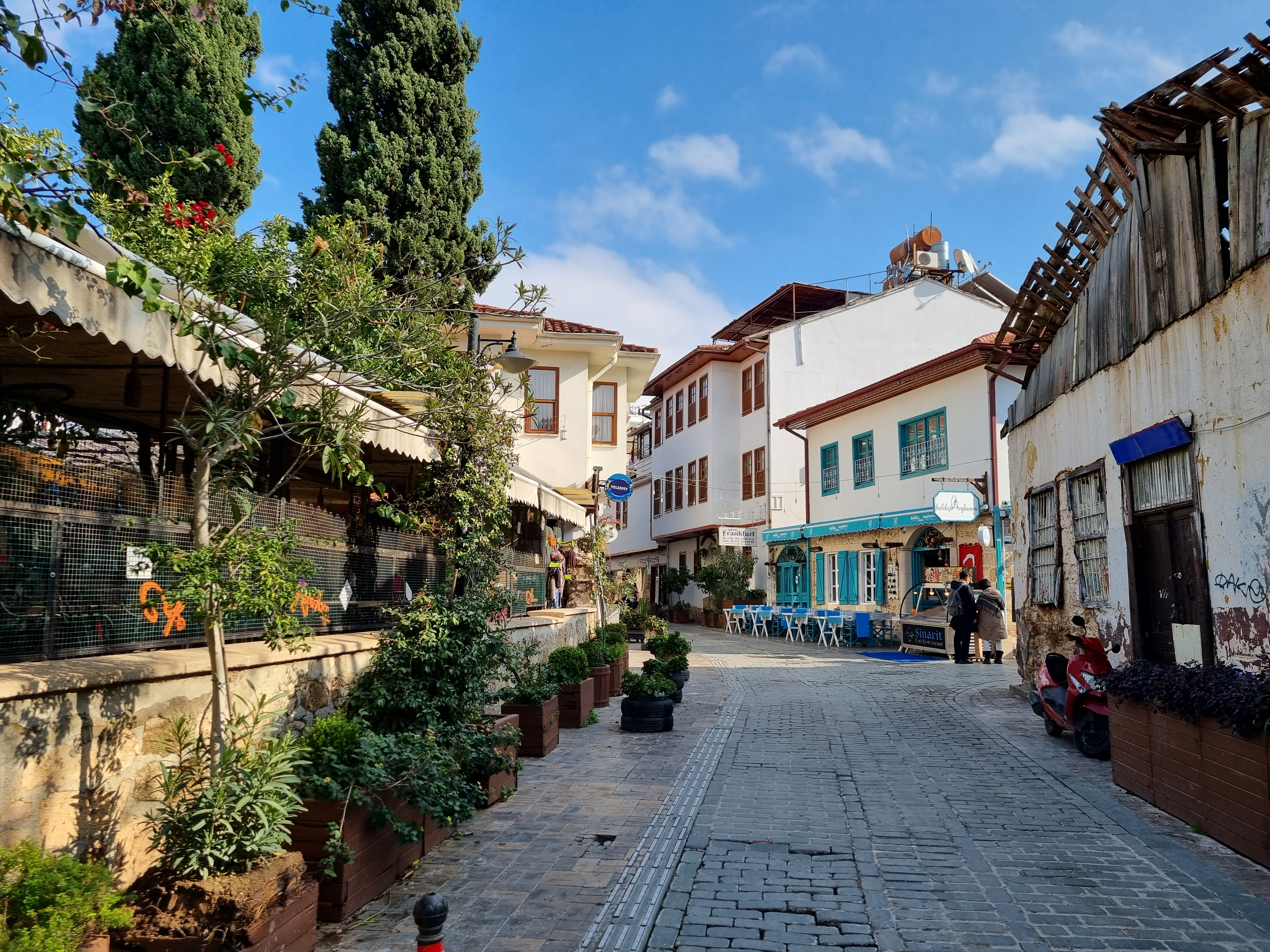
A street view from Kaleiçi

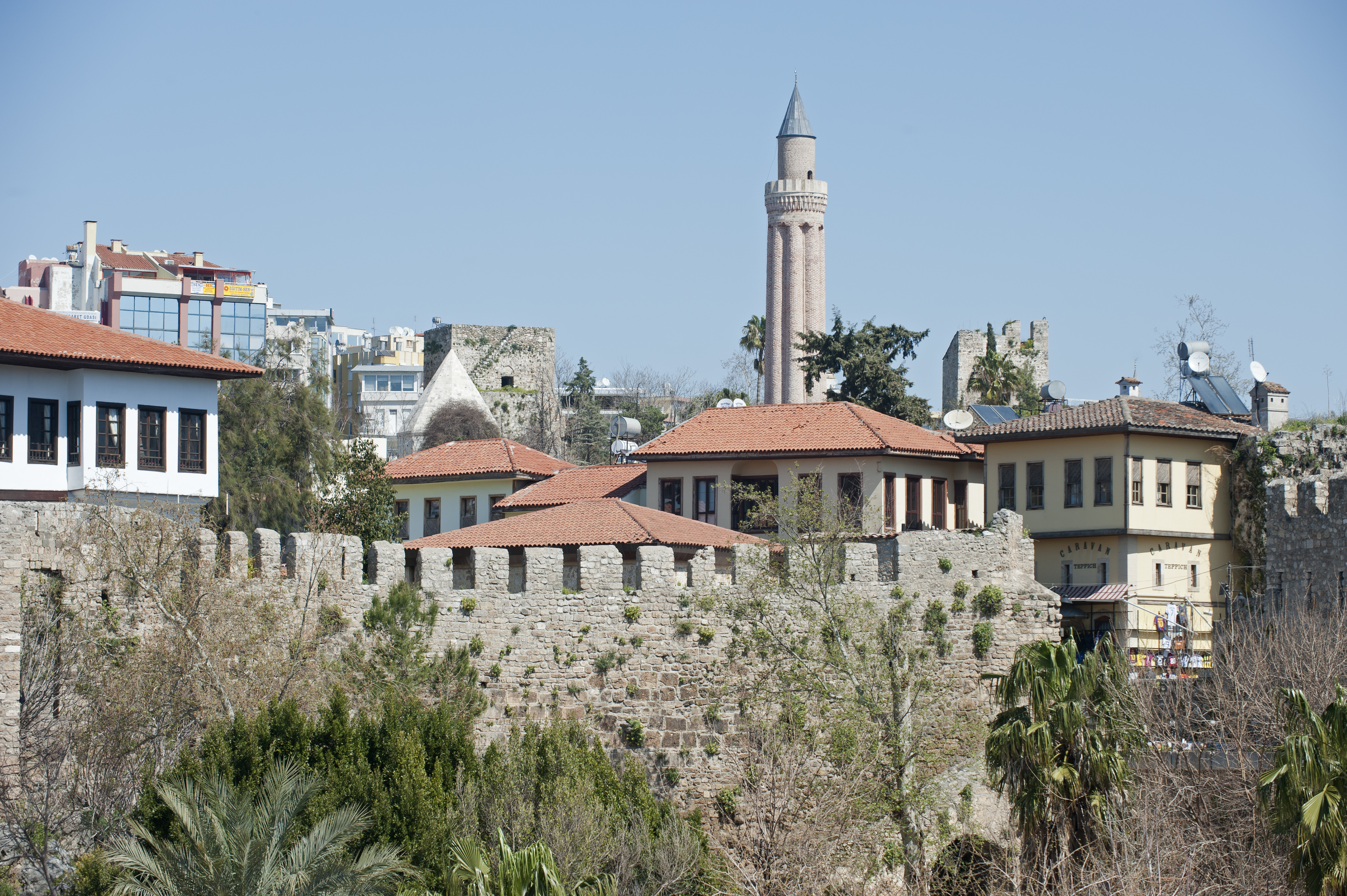
The walls of the town

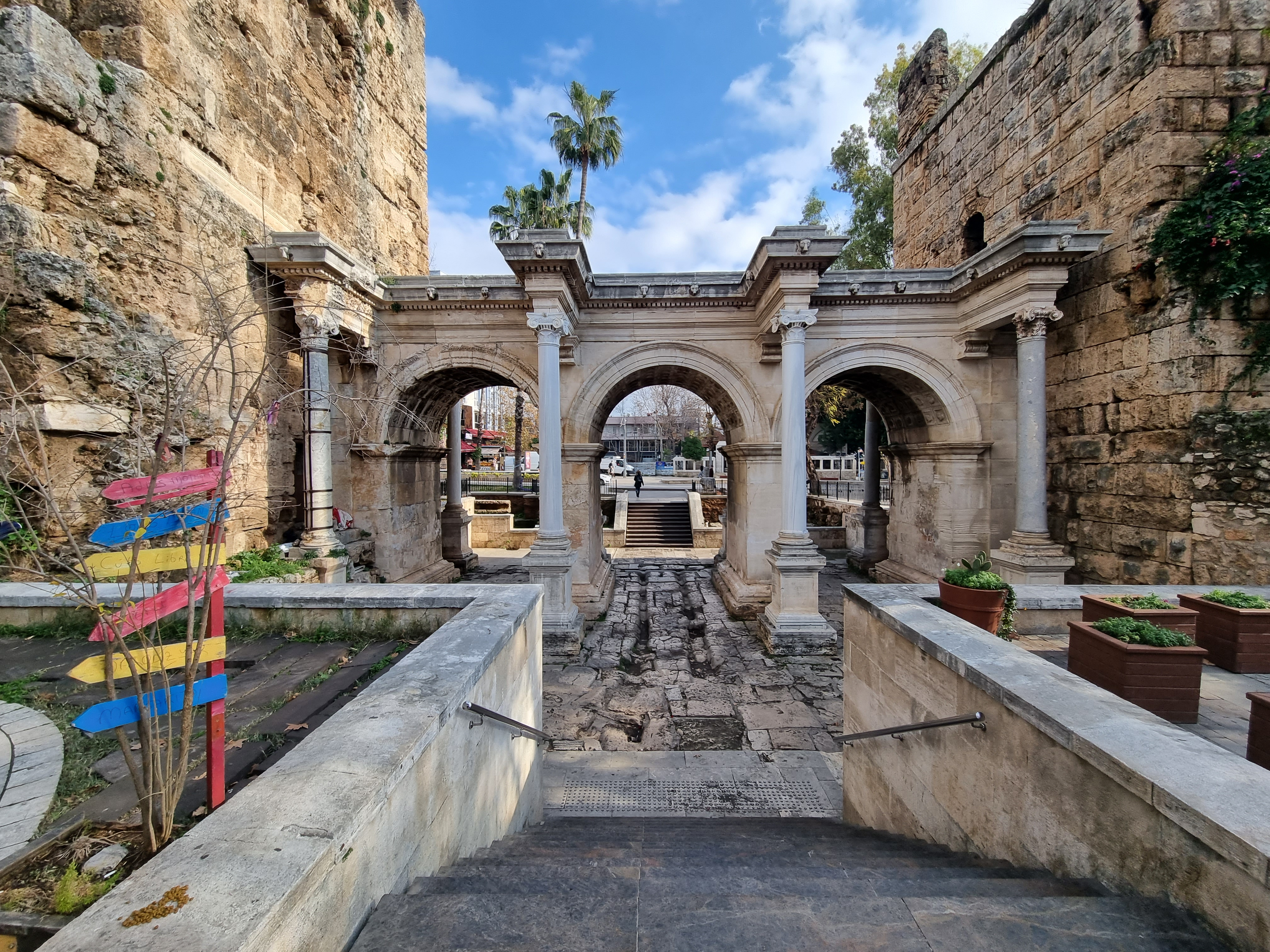
The Hadrian's Gate

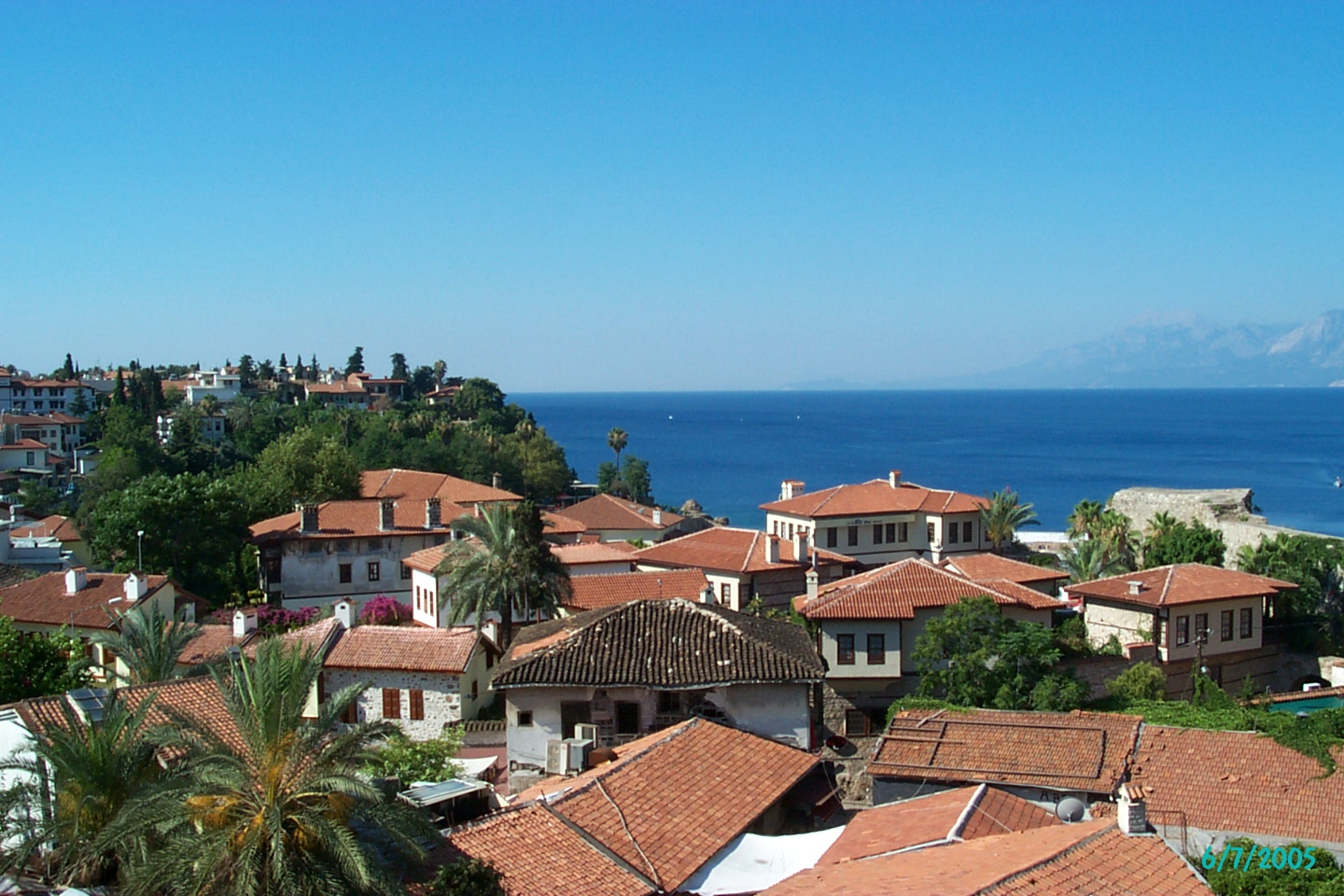
Panorama of Kaleiçi

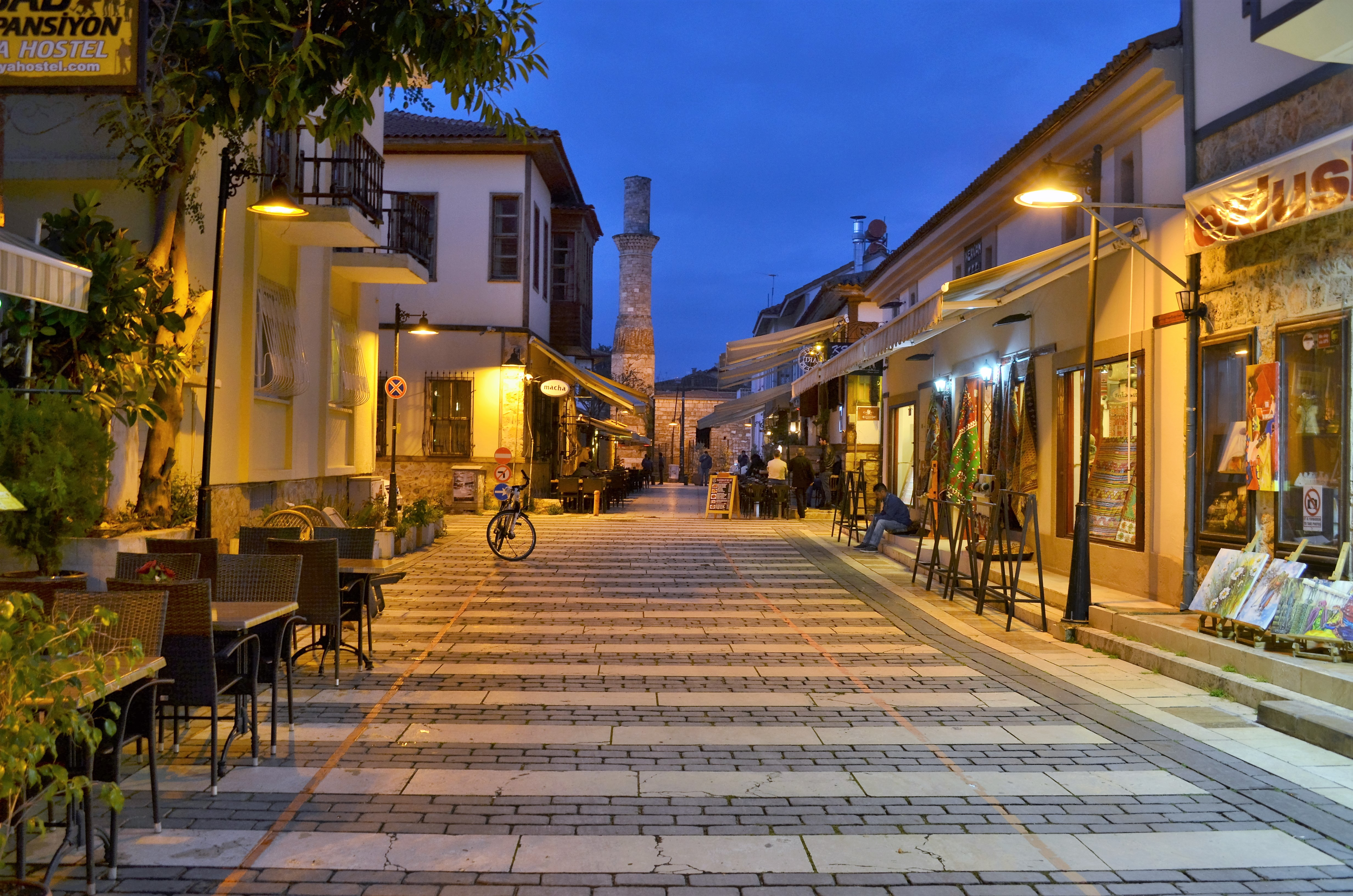
A street in Kaleiçi at evening

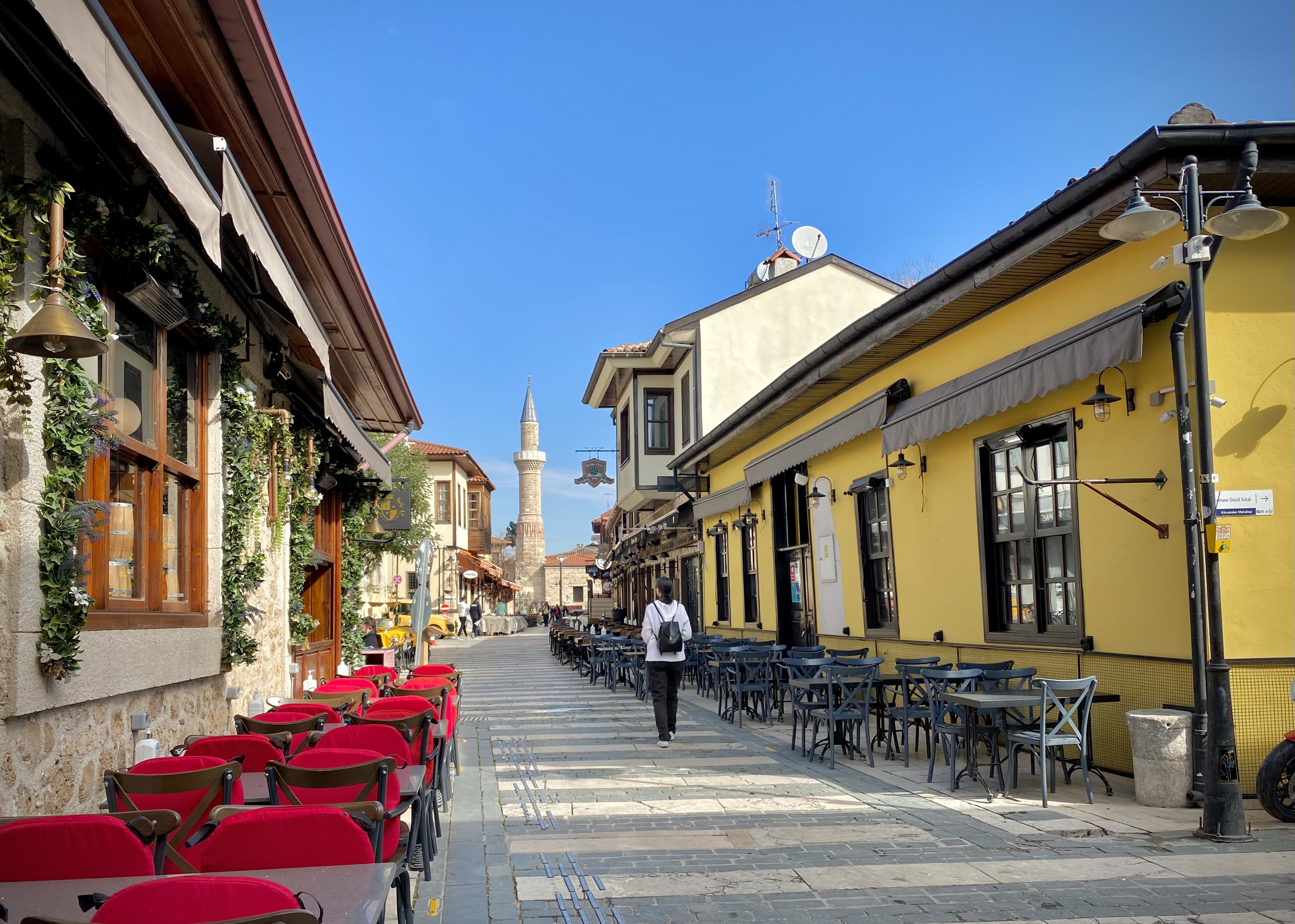
Streetscape and Sultan Alaaddin Mosque in the background
