= Güzeloluk, Muratpaşa =

Güzeloluk
- Neighbourhood
- Location within Turkey
- Coordinates: 36.87646°N 30.7689°E
- Country: Turkey
- Province: Antalya
- District: Muratpaşa
- Population (2025): 8,740
- Time zone: UTC+3 (TRT)
- Postal code: 07200
- Area code: 242

Güzeloluk is a neighbourhood in the municipality and district of Muratpaşa, Antalya Province, Turkey. Its population is 8,740 (2025).

== Population ==
Historical population
Year	Pop.	±% p.a.
2007	4,524	—
2008	4,862	+7.47%
2009	5,409	+11.25%
2010	6,523	+20.60%
2011	7,075	+8.46%
2012	7,416	+4.82%
2013	7,674	+3.48%
2014	7,806	+1.72%
2015	8,234	+5.48%
2016	8,478	+2.96%
2017	8,547	+0.81%
2018	8,669	+1.43%
2019	8,906	+2.73%
2020	9,005	+1.11%
2021	9,101	+1.07%
2022	9,156	+0.60%
2023	8,846	−3.39%
2024	8,699	−1.66%
2025	8,740	+0.47%
Source: TÜİK
