= Yivli Minaret Mosque =

Mosque in Turkey

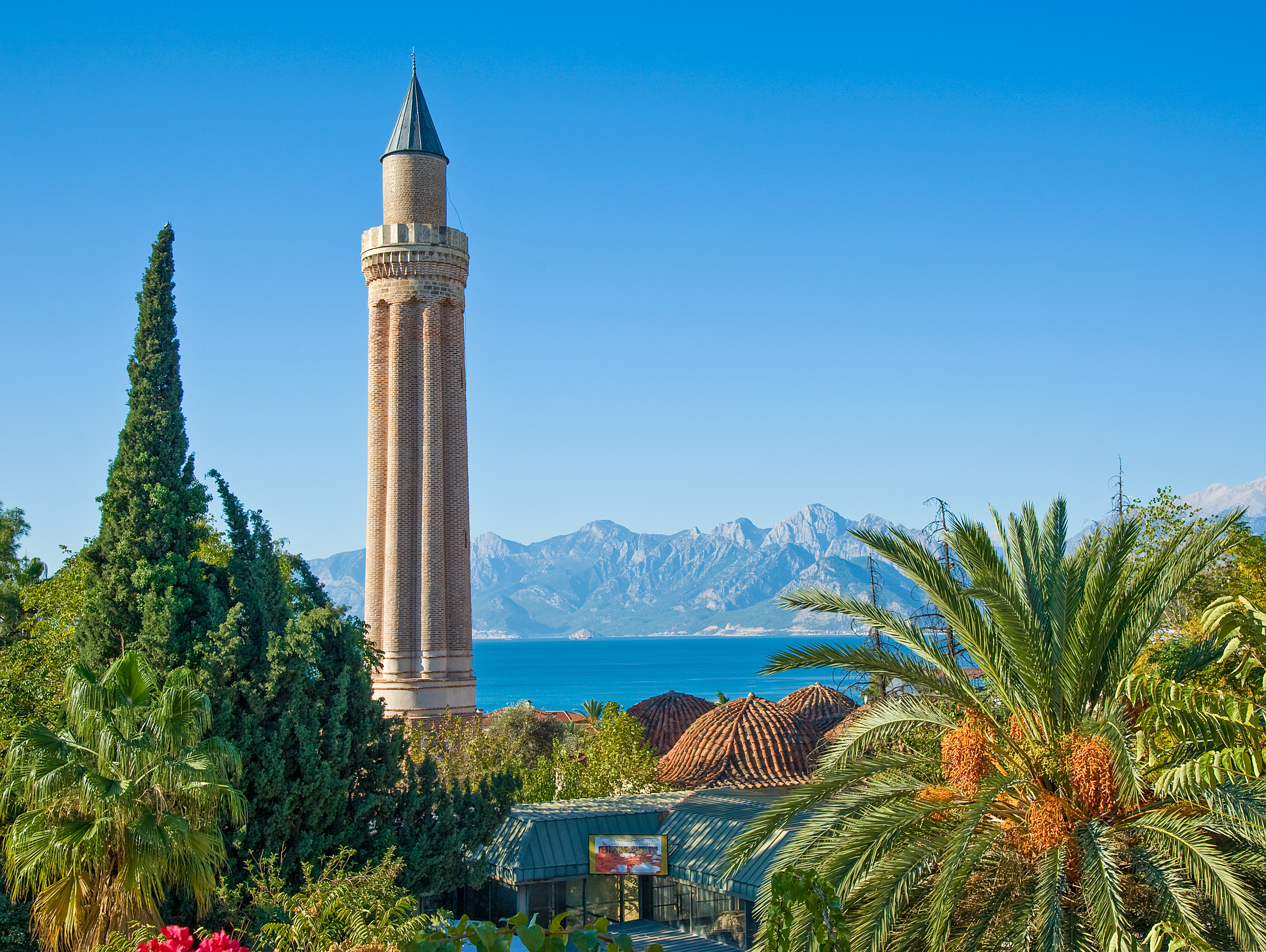
- The fluted minaret.

Religion
- Affiliation: Islam

Location
- Location: Antalya, Turkey
- Interactive map of Yivli Minaret Mosque
- Coordinates: 36°53′11″N 30°42′16″E

Architecture
- Type: Mosque
- Style: Anatolian Seljuk architecture
- Completed: 1230/1373

Specifications
- Minaret height: 38 m
- Materials: Stone, brick

Yivli Minaret Mosque (Turkish: Yivli Minare Camii) is a historic mosque located in Kaleiçi, the old town center of Antalya, Turkey. Situated along Cumhuriyet Street near Kalekapısı Square, it is one of the city’s most important landmarks. Its fluted brick minaret, adorned with traces of blue tilework, has become a widely recognized symbol of Antalya.

== History ==
The origins of the Yivli Minaret Mosque date back to the early 13th century. Following the Seljuk conquest of Antalya in 1216, a mosque was constructed on the site of a ruined Byzantine church around 1230. This early structure reflected the Seljuk approach of integrating earlier architectural elements into new Islamic buildings. The minaret, which gives the mosque its name, was likely commissioned during the reign of Alaaddin Keykubad I (1220–1237), a ruler known for his extensive architectural patronage across Anatolia.

The original mosque was either destroyed or fell into disrepair during the 14th century. In 1373, it was rebuilt by Mehmet Bey, a member of the Hamidids dynasty. The new design introduced a prayer hall covered with six domes, supported by columns incorporating ancient capitals. Over time, the mosque served various functions, including housing the Antalya Museum for a period in the 20th century. Restoration efforts were carried out in 1953 and 1961, with further extensive work completed between 2007 and 2010. During the latest restoration, historic water channels were uncovered beneath the structure, now visible through a glass floor section.

== Architecture ==
The mosque has a rectangular plan and reflects early examples of multi-domed religious architecture in Anatolia. Its prayer hall is covered with six domes arranged in two rows, supported by twelve columns topped with reused capitals, likely from Roman or Byzantine-era buildings. The walls are constructed of finely cut stone, and the interior features minimal decoration, consistent with early Seljuk aesthetic principles.

The most distinctive element of the complex is its 38-meter-high minaret, composed of red brick and rising from a massive square stone base. The shaft is divided into eight fluted sections and was originally covered with turquoise and dark blue tiles, fragments of which are still visible today.

Yivli Minaret is frequently compared to other fluted minarets in Turkey, such as those of the Burmalı Minaret in Amasya, Karahasan Mosque in Tire, and Gedik Ahmet Pasha Mosque in Afyonkarahisar. Despite similarities, Yivli Minaret distinguishes itself through its height, design, and historical significance. It continues to serve as an active place of worship and remains a defining feature of Antalya’s skyline.

== Gallery ==
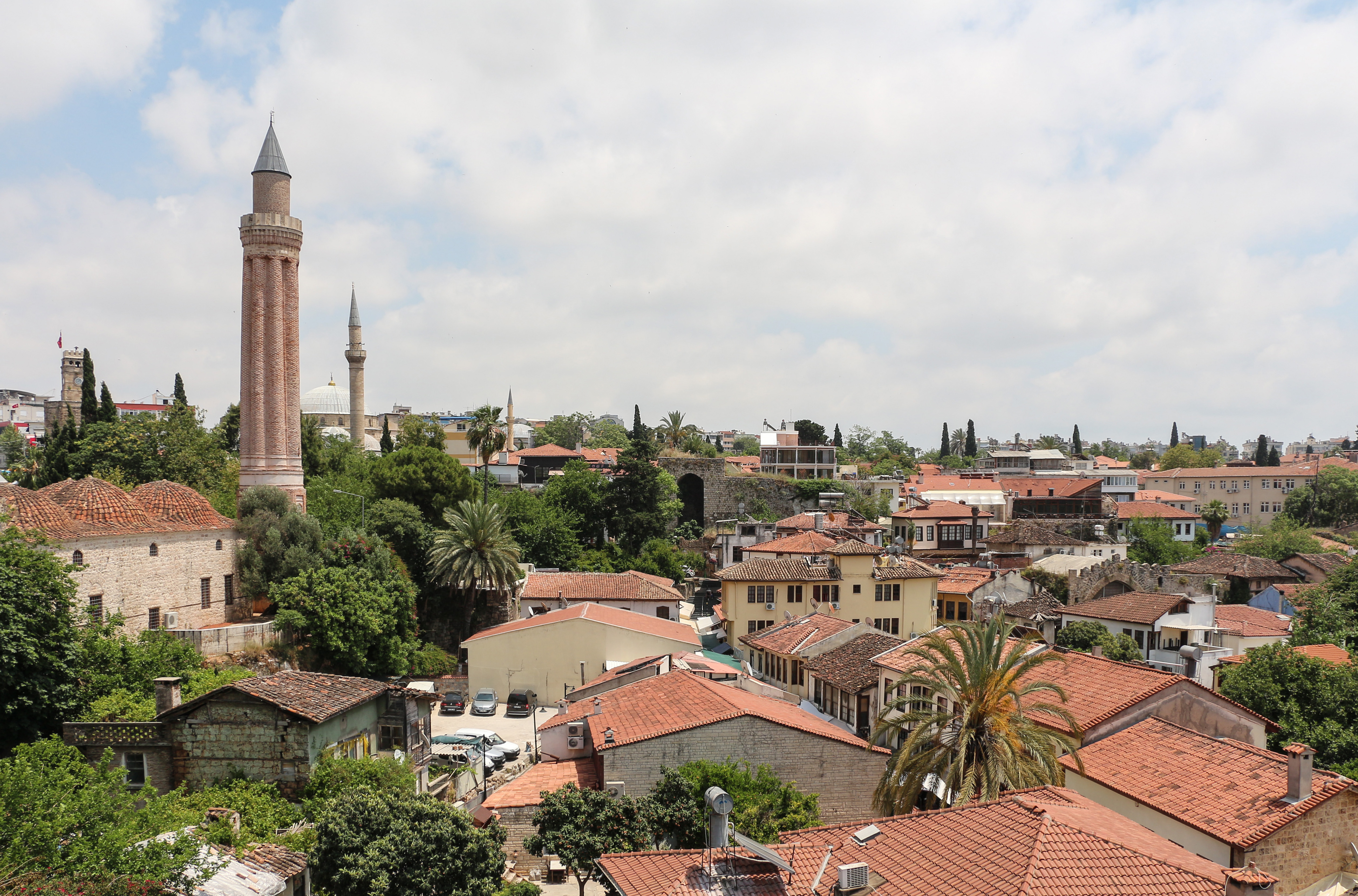
General view of the mosque and the town

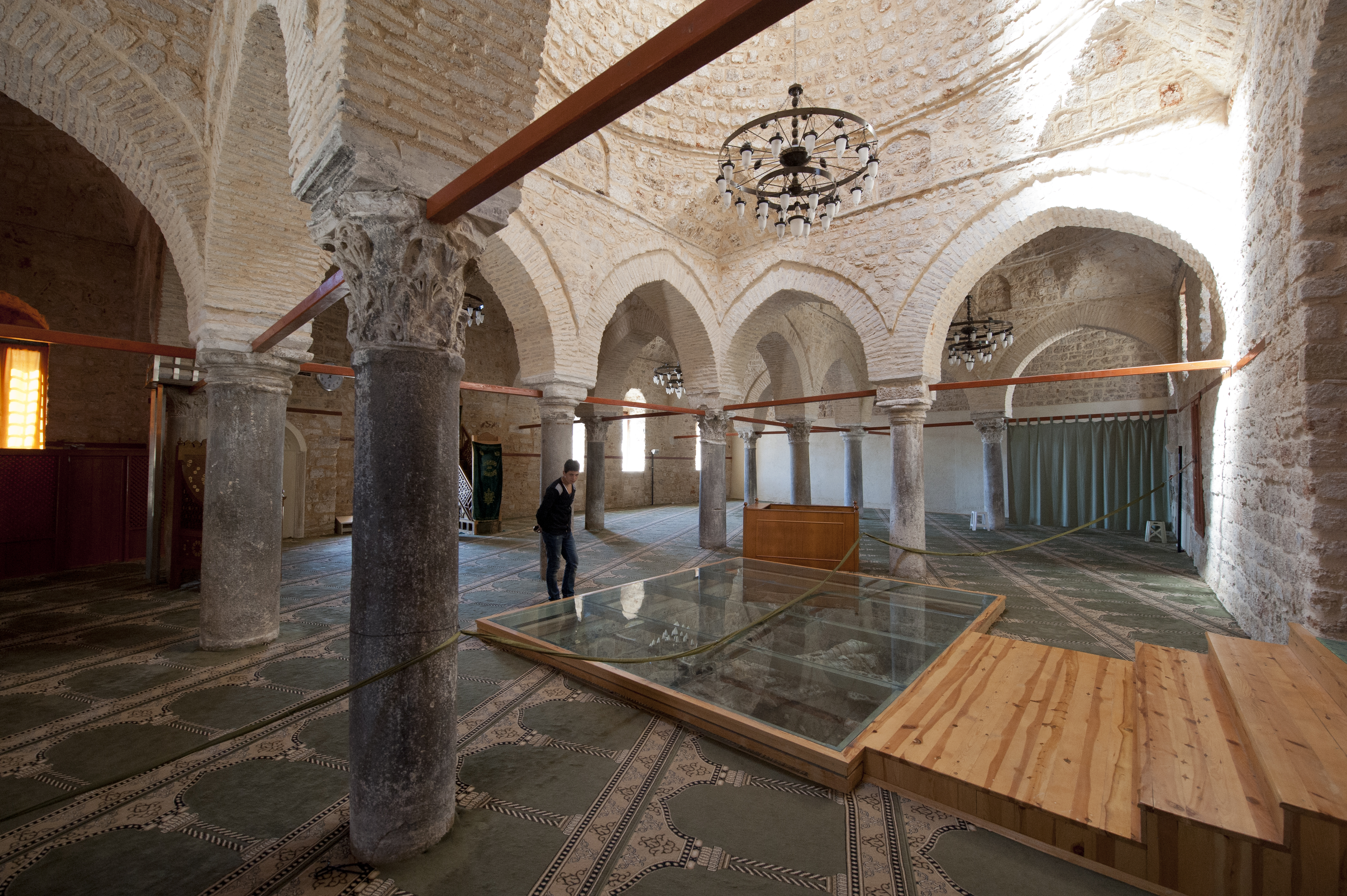
The interior of the mosque

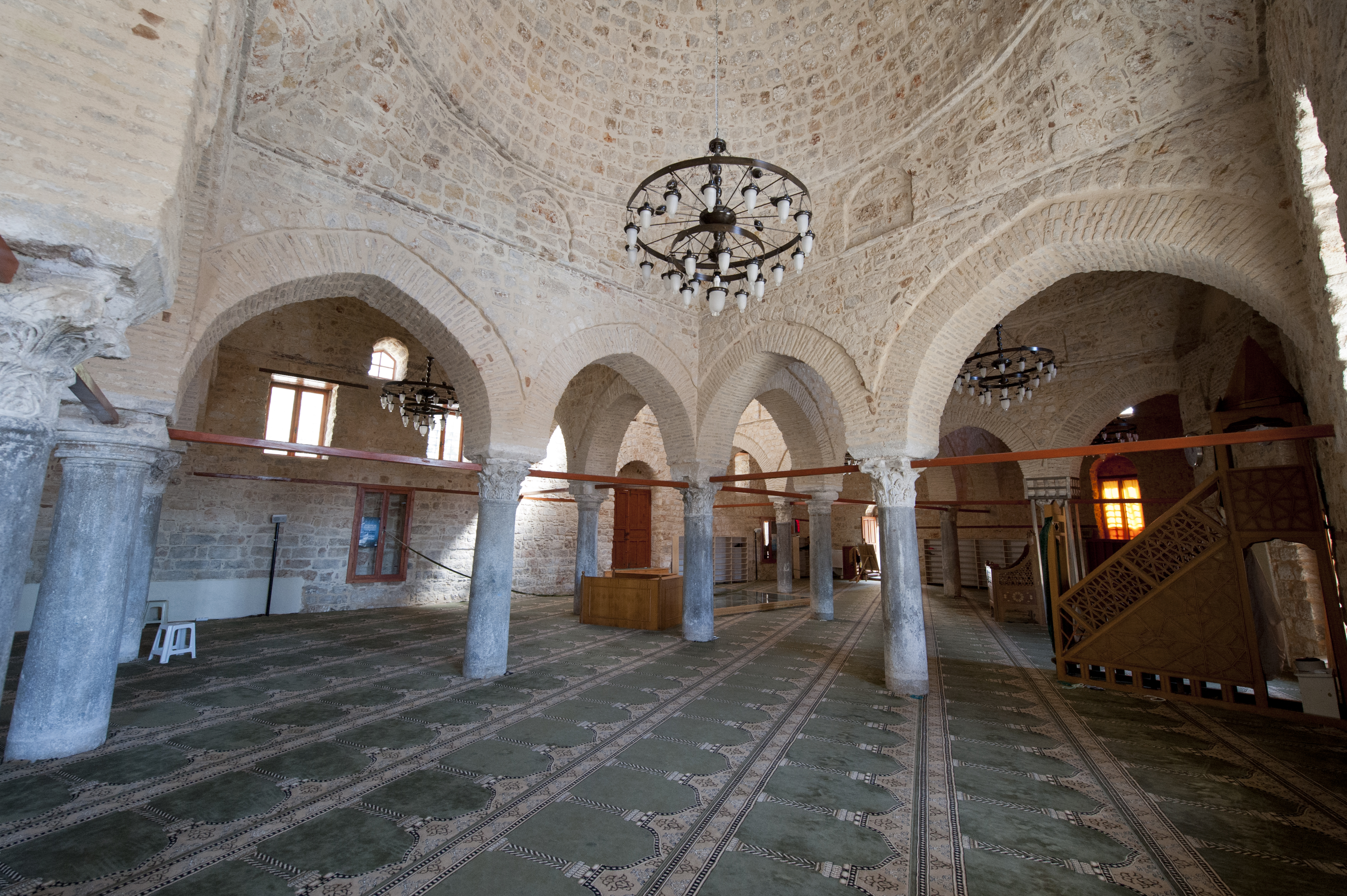
The interior of the mosque

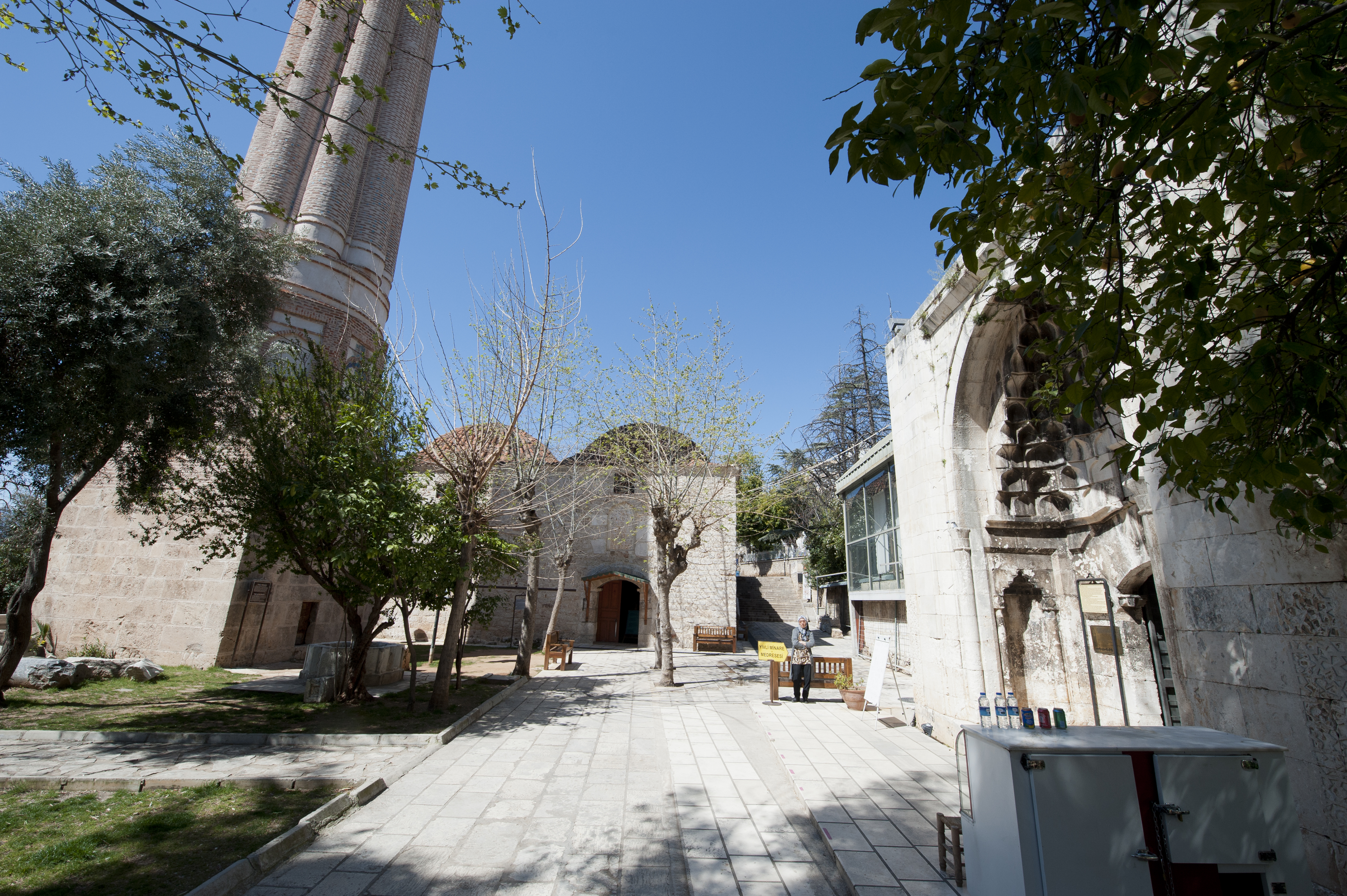
The garden of the complex

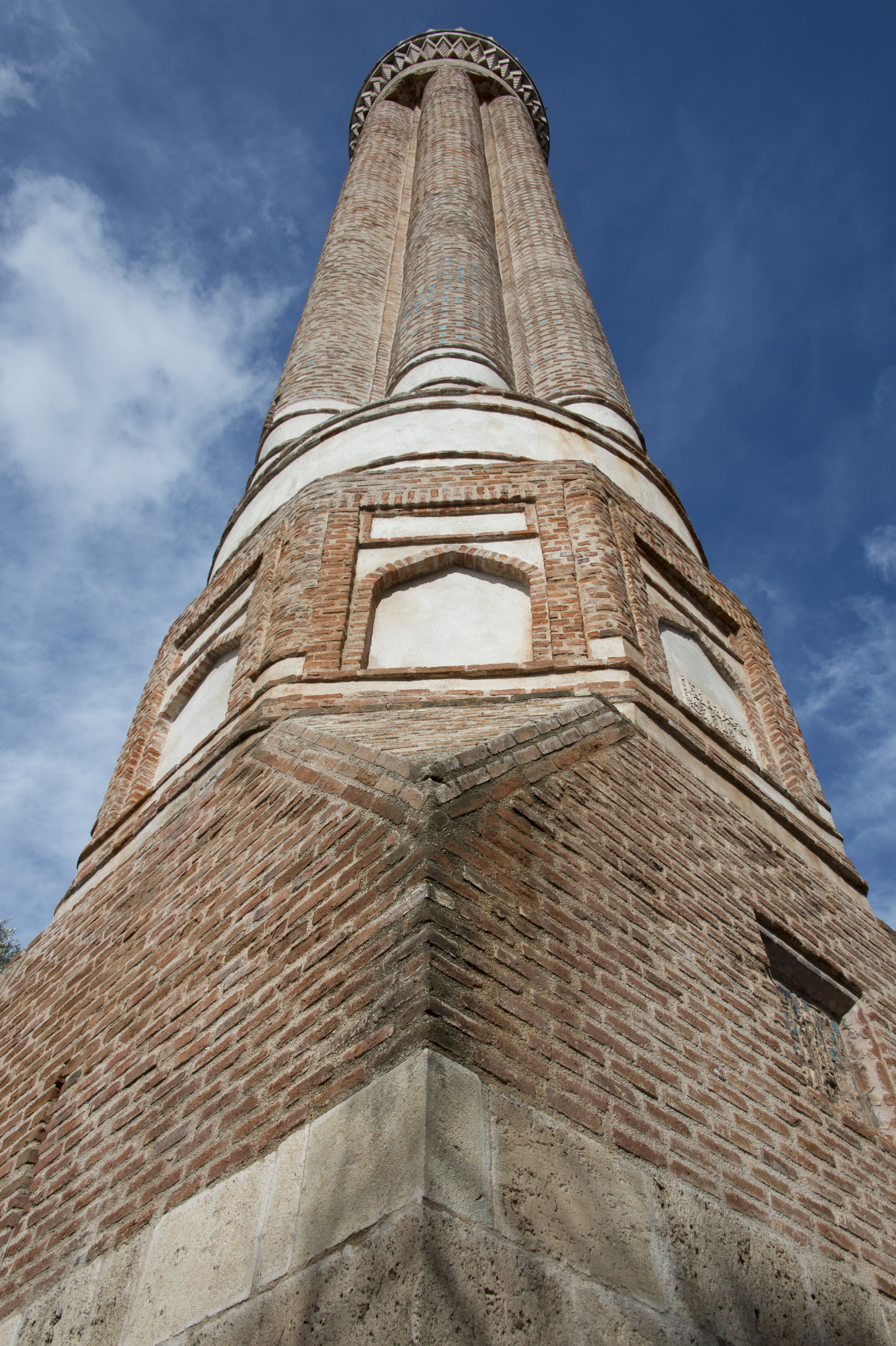
The minaret
