= Hidirlik Tower =

Roman landmark tower in Antalya, Turkey

Hıdırlık Tower
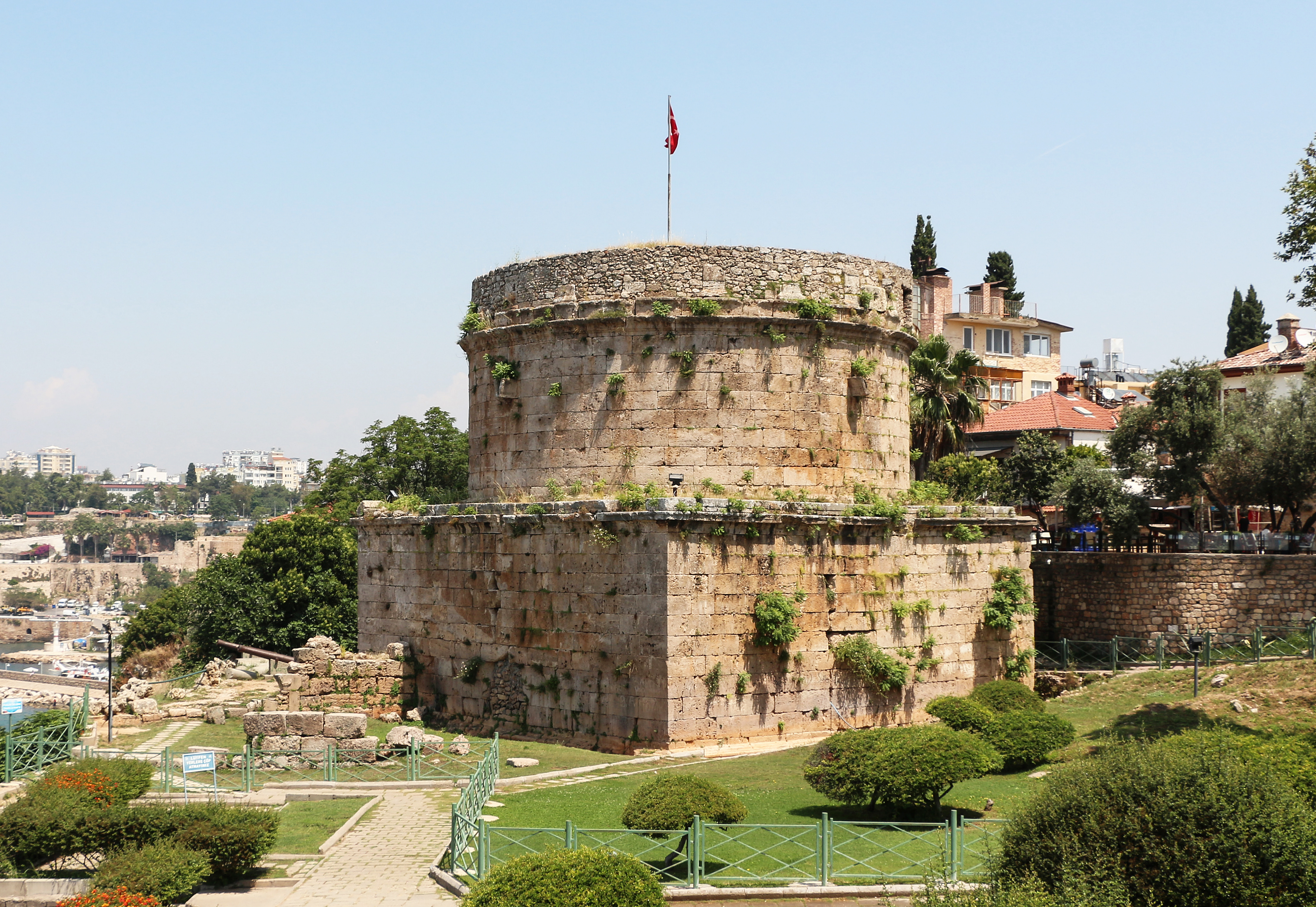
- Hıdırlık Tower
- Interactive map of the Hıdırlık Tower area

General information
- Type: Observation tower
- Location: Karaalioglu Park, Turkey
- Coordinates: 36°52′53″N 30°42′13″E

Hıdırlık Tower (Turkish: Hıdırlık Kulesi) is a landmark tower of tawny stone in Antalya, Turkey, where Kaleiçi meets Karaalioğlu Park.

== History ==
It is believed that the ruling Roman Empire built it in the second century CE on a square plan. In the same century, it was turned into circular tower. Under the Byzantines, it was used as a military outpost.

It has since been used as a fortification or a lighthouse.

The tower is situated at the southern side of the place, where the land walls of the city join the sea walls. The 14-metre-high (46 ft) structure consists of a circular tower rising on a quadratic pedestal. The tower's gate at the eastern side leads to a small room, from where a narrow staircase goes up. There are signs of restoration work on the upper part done in the Seljuk and Ottoman eras.

Its current name, Hıdırlık (literally "a place of Khidr") means a place where the Hıdırellez festival takes place. Hıdırellez is a spring festival. In some Muslim cultures, it is believed that Khidr and Elijah meet once each year. During this time, a spring festival, Hıdırellez takes place. Hıdırlıks are particularly chosen for Hıdırellez ceremonies. There are many Hıdırlıks in Turkey. From 1919 to 1922, the fortification and the city of Antalya itself was occupied by Italy as part of the aftermath of the dismemberment of the Ottoman Empire. After the Italians occupied Antalya, irregular Turkish forces started an armed rebellion against the occupying Italians. The Italians later retreated and gave the city to the forces of Mustafa Kemal.
