= Karaalioğlu Park =

Urban park in Antalya, Turkey

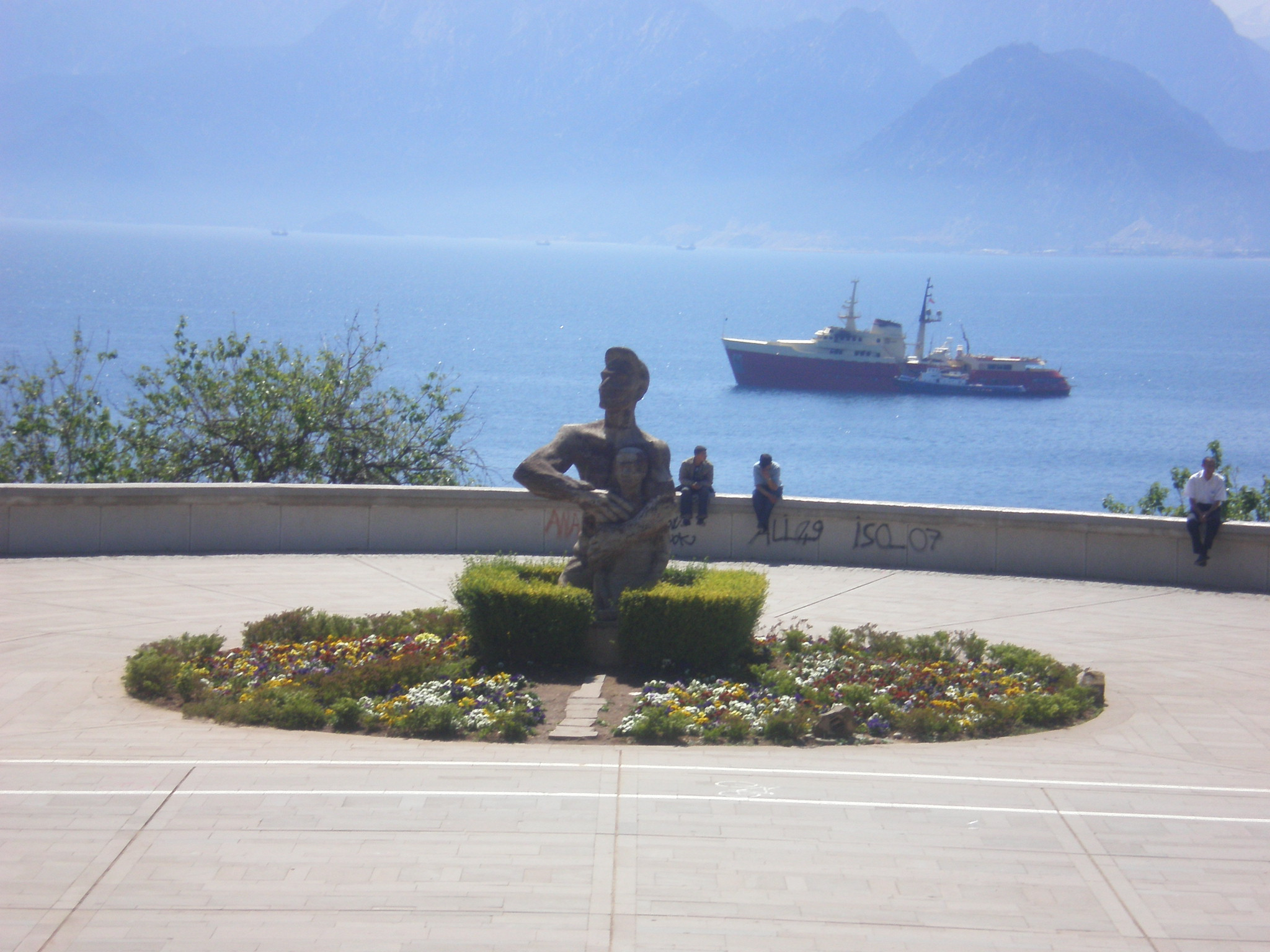
Worker and Son monument in the park, sculpted by Mehmet Aksoy

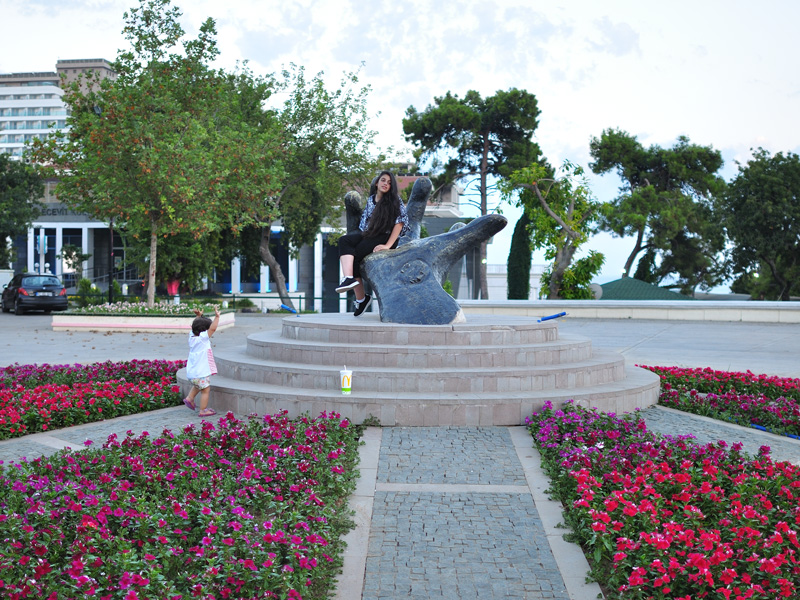
Hand sculpture

Karaalioğlu Park (Turkish: Karaalioğlu Parkı) is a large park in Antalya, Turkey. It is just south of Kaleiçi in the city center, easily reached on foot or by tram. The mayor's office, Municipal city theater, and an ancient fortress called Hıdırlık Tower overlooking the Roman harbor, view of the cliffs and the broad blue expanse of the Gulf of Antalya are major attractions of the park.

Urban History museum is planning to the park as of mid 2000s.

There are the following monuments and statues in the park: the Nâzım Hikmet monument at 36°52′50.4″N 30°42′14.3″E which was created in 2010 on the 47th anniversary of the poet's death, the statue of Don Quixote at 36°52′47.2″N 30°42′14.9″E, the Worker and Son monument at 36°52′45.0″N 30°42′16.9″E, the Hand sculpture at 36°52′41.5″N 30°42′20.6″E and the Frog sculptures at 36°52′45.6″N 30°42′33.4″E.
