= Tekeli Mehmet Pasha Mosque =

Ottoman mosque in Antalya, Turkey

Coordinates: 36°53′11″N 30°42′21″E

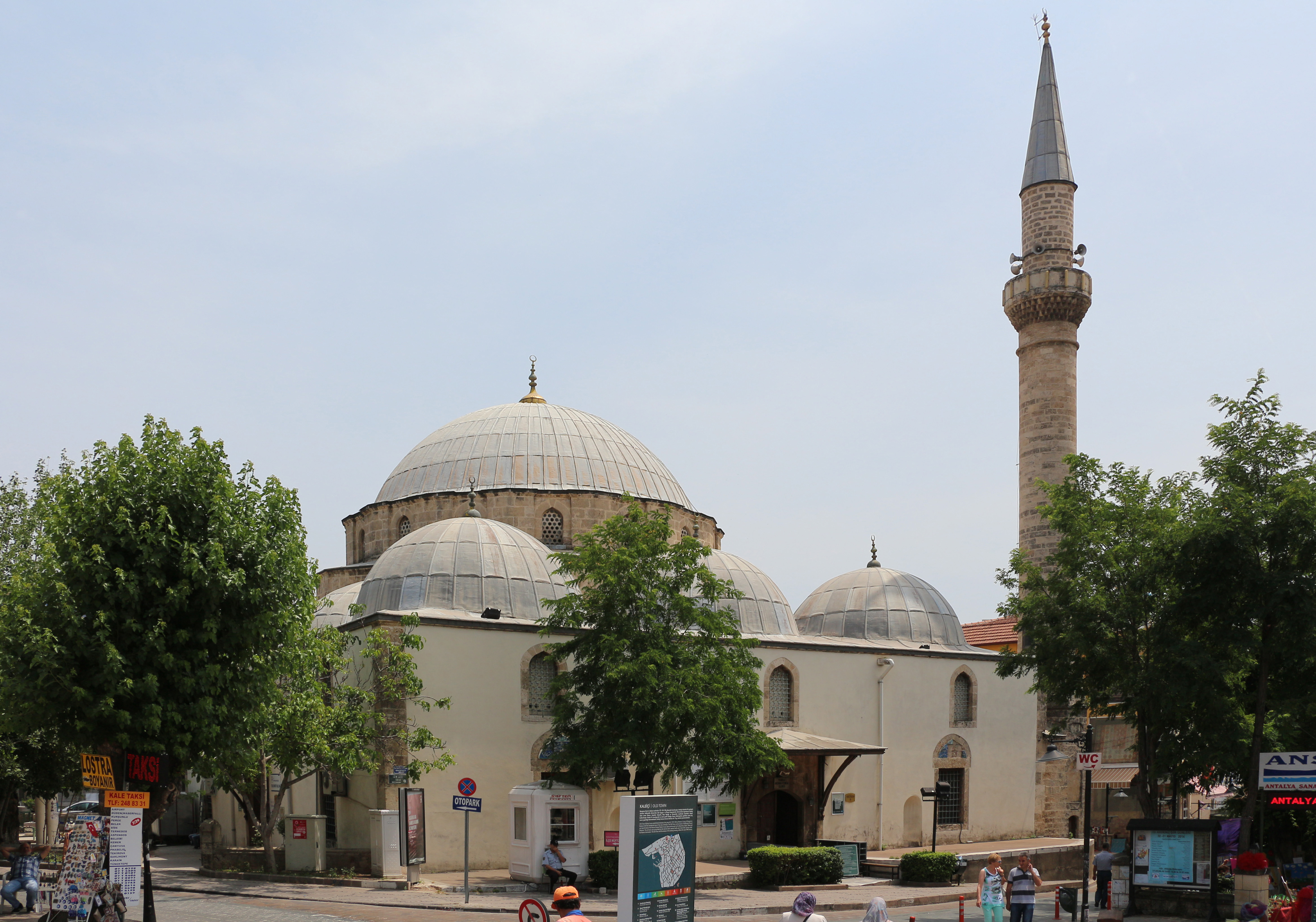
Tekeli Mehmet Paşa Mosque in Antalya.

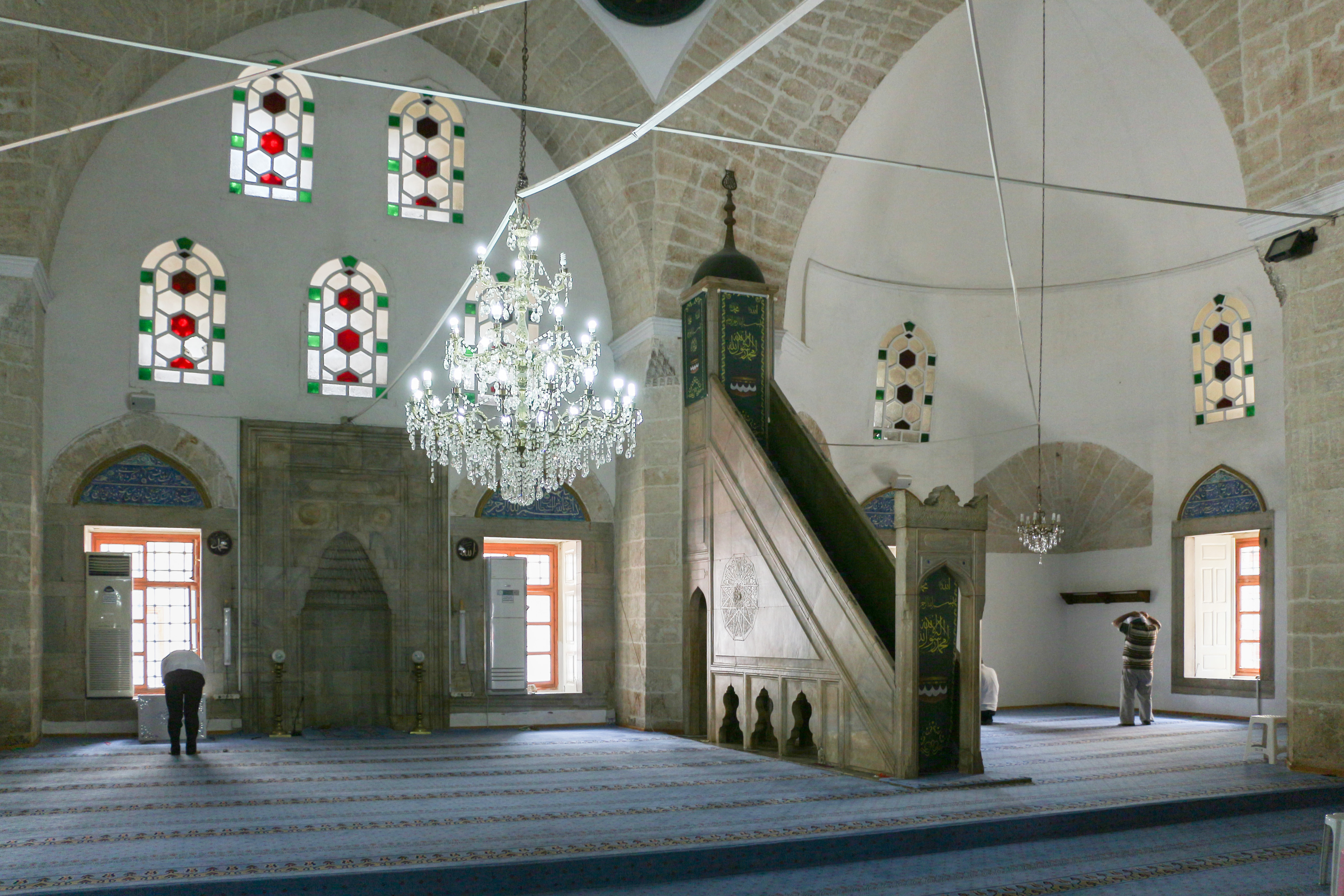
Interior of the Mosque

The Tekeli Mehmet Paşa Mosque (Turkish: Tekeli Mehmet Paşa Camii) is a mosque in the city of Antalya, Turkey. The mosque takes its name from Lala Mehmed Pasa.

== Architecture ==
Built in the 17th century in the Kalekapisi district, the mosque is one of the most important Ottoman mosques in the city. The main dome, which rises on a high rim, is supported by three semi domes, one each in the east, west, and south, as well as three domes on the northern side. There are tiled panels decorated with Koranic verses in taliq script on the pointed arch-formed lunettes of the windows on the northern façade of the mosque and inside it.
