= Hadrian's Gate =

Ancient Roman memorial gate in Antalya, Turkey

- Üçkapılar (Turkish)
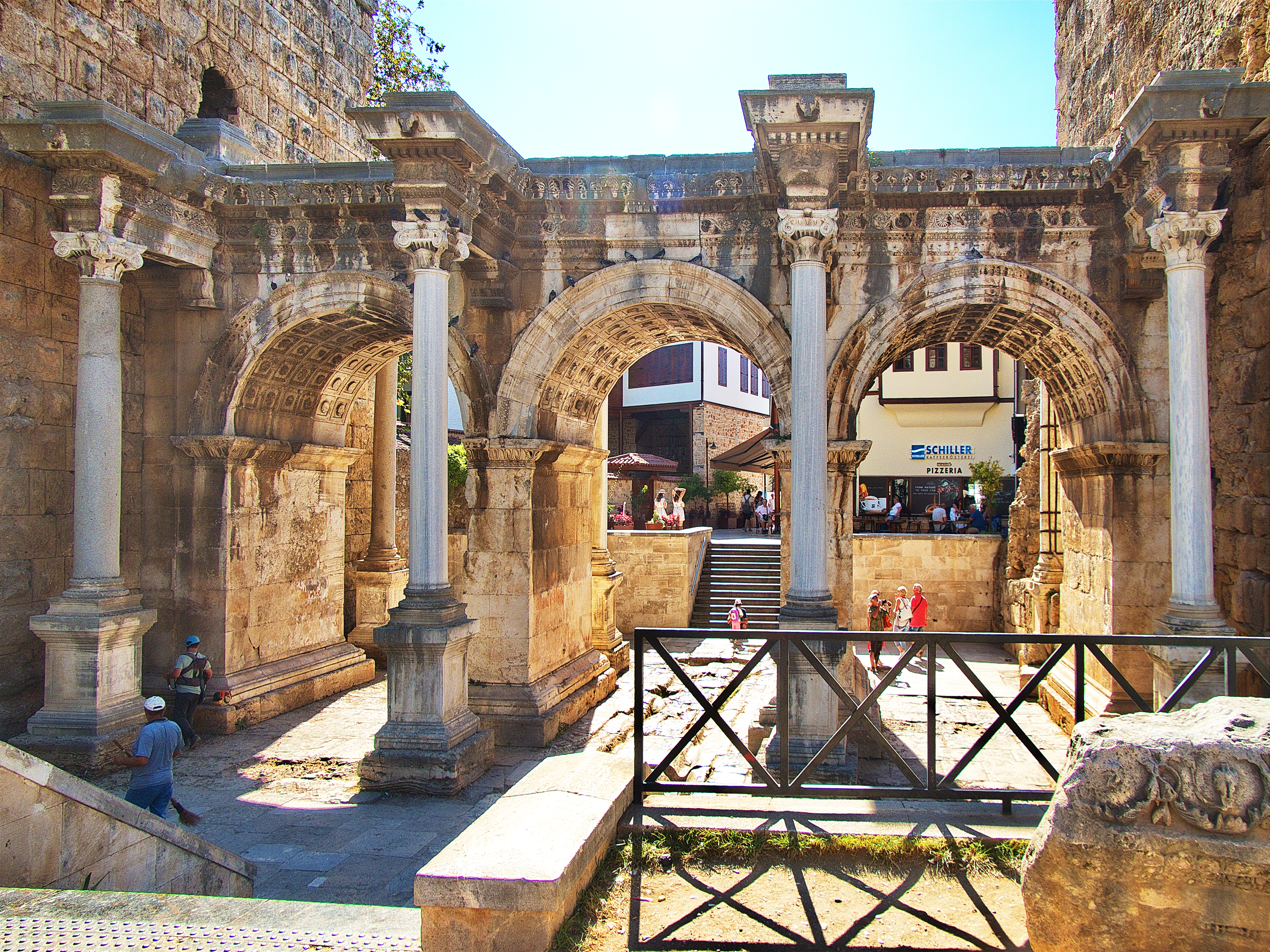
- Hadrian's Gate, with original Roman era walkway

- Location within Turkey
- 36°53′07″N 30°42′31″E
- Type: Settlement
- Periods: Roman Empire
- Cultures: Roman
- Location: Near Muratpaşa, Antalya Province, Turkey
- Region: Anatolia

History
- Built: Around 150 CE

Site notes
- Condition: In ruins

Hadrian's Gate (Turkish: Üçkapılar, meaning "The Three Gates") is a memorial gate located in Antalya, Turkey, which was built in the name of the Roman emperor Hadrian, who visited the city in 130 CE. It was later incorporated in the walls that surround the city and harbor, of which it is the only remaining entrance gate today.

The gate was rediscovered by the Irish hydrographer Francis Beaufort in 1817, while commanding on HMS Fridericksteen.

== Description ==
Hadrian's Gate consists of two colonnaded facades, three entry arches rising above four pylons and a tower standing on either side. It is about 8 meters (26.2 feet) high. The Southern Tower, known as the Julia Sancta, is from the Roman era but was likely built independently of the gate. The bottom section of the Northern Tower is from Roman times, but the upper part was rebuilt in the first half of the thirteenth century AD during the reign of Seljuk sultan Alaeddin Keykubat I and contains an inscription in Arabic script.

It is considered to be Pamphylia's most beautiful gate. The upper part has three apertures in the shape of a cupola, and except for the pillars (made of granite) is built entirely of white marble. The three passage ways are decorated with floral and rosette reliefs. The ornamentation is very striking. The original gate was two stories, and although little is known of the top story, it is believed to have held statues of the emperor and his family. An entablature on the top of the Gate extends to both sides with a height of 1.28 meters (4.2 feet). It includes a frieze decorated with floral motifs and an ornate cornice with lion heads.

Formerly the city walls enclosed the outside of the gate and it was not used for many years. This may be the reason why it has not been harmed, and it was only revealed when the walls collapsed in the 1950s. The gate was restored in 1959. The pavement was stripped away to reveal the original Roman era walkway, which can be seen through perspex flooring while walking through the main arch. Visitors to the Gate can look down and see incredibly deep grooves where the pavement was worn away by countless carts passing in and out of the city.

When the gate was uncovered and restored, a dozen bronze letters were found at the foot of the gate. These letters were part of an inscription honoring Hadrian. As of 2017, the letters are split between different museums and private collections around the world. Nine letters are in Vienna, two are in Berlin, and there are some in England, at the British Museum in London and the Ashmolean Museum in Oxford. It is believed the missing second story would have also held an inscription.

== Legends ==
According to local legend, Sultana Belkis, the Queen of Sheba, is said to have passed under those gates and enjoyed a happy day in the palace in Aspendos on her way to visit King Solomon. However, if she did so, she would have passed through a predecessor version of Hadrian's Gate, as she and Solomon lived approximately a thousand years before Hadrian.

== Gallery ==
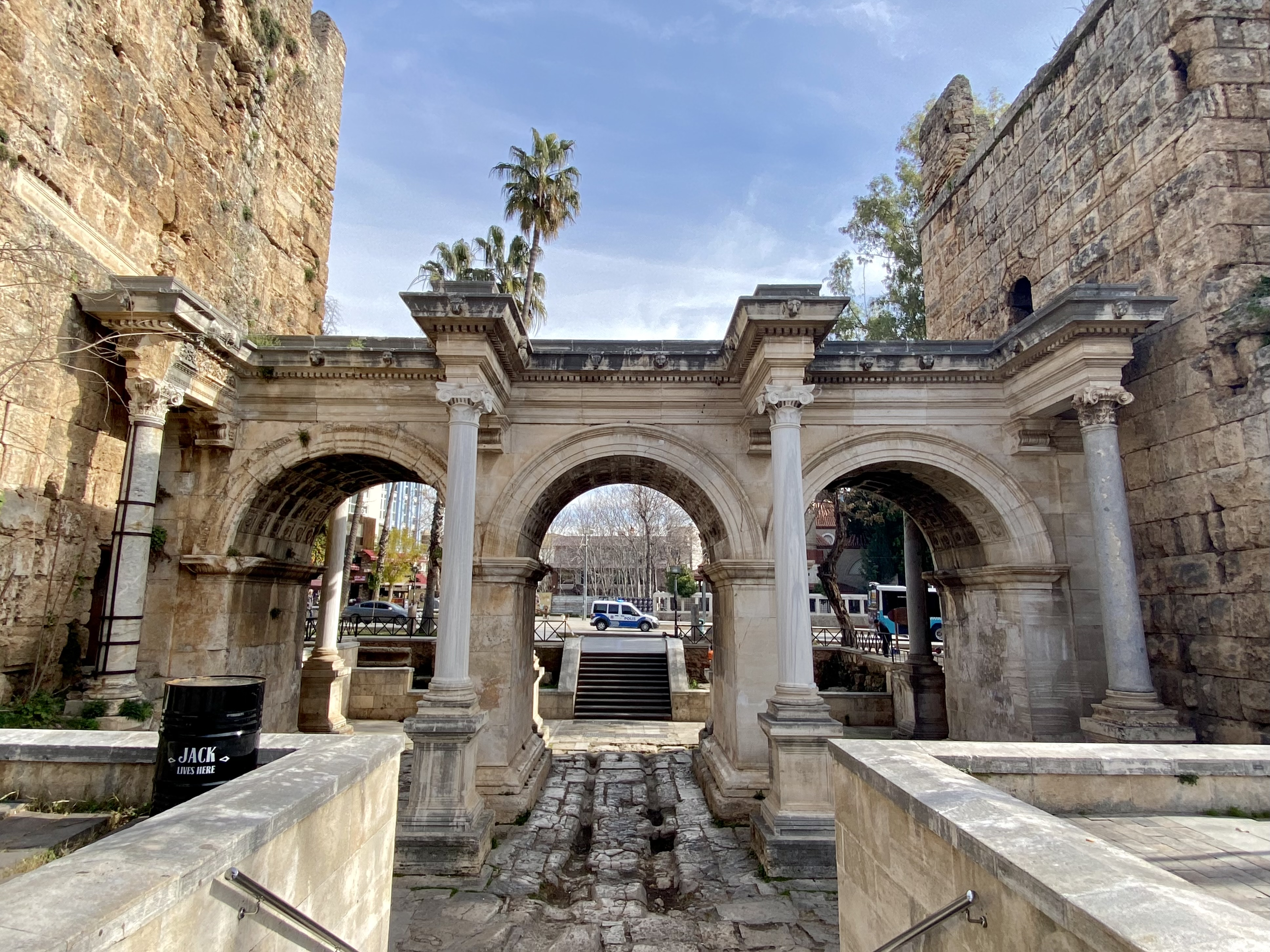
Hadrian's Gate front view

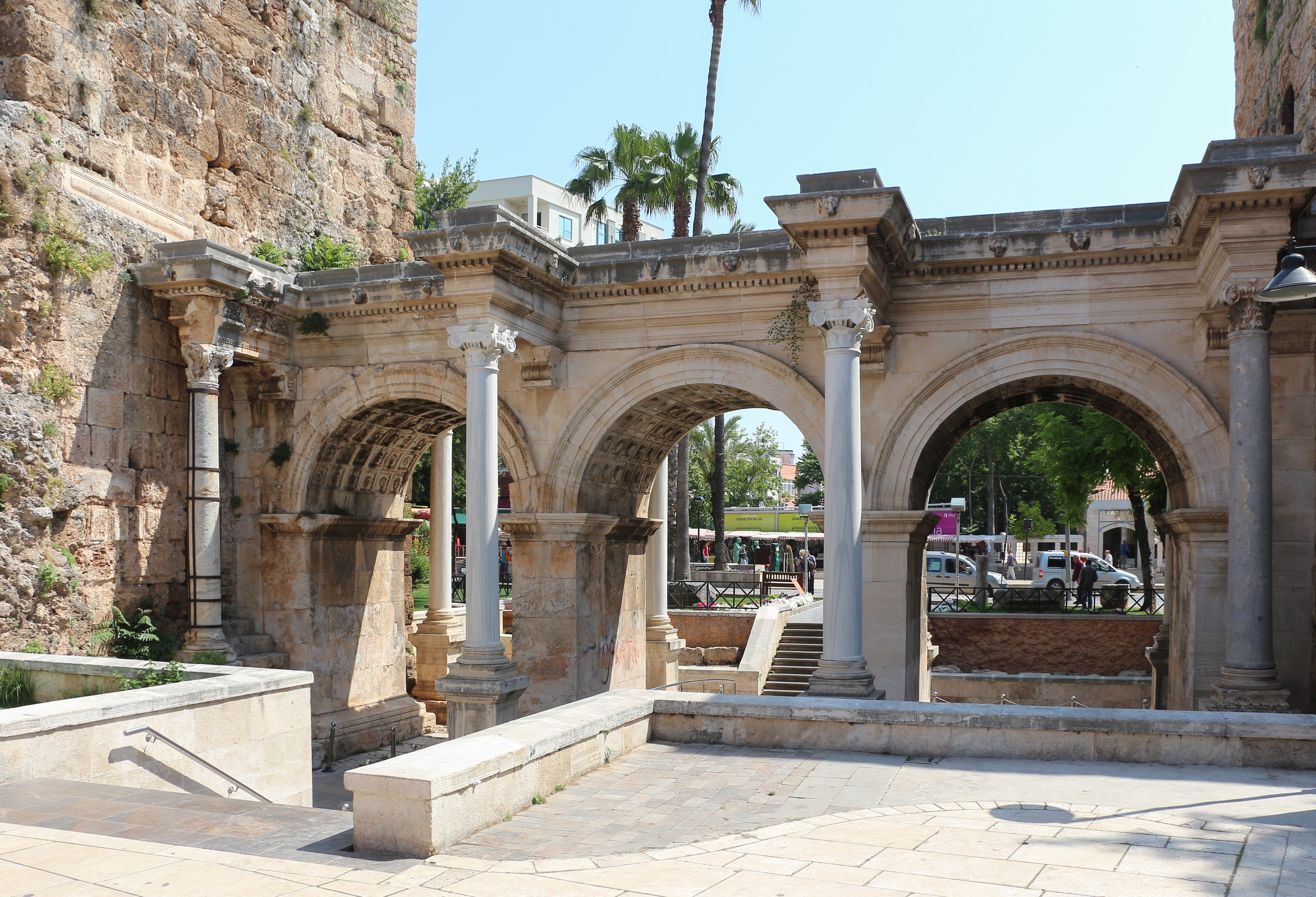
Hadrian's Gate back view

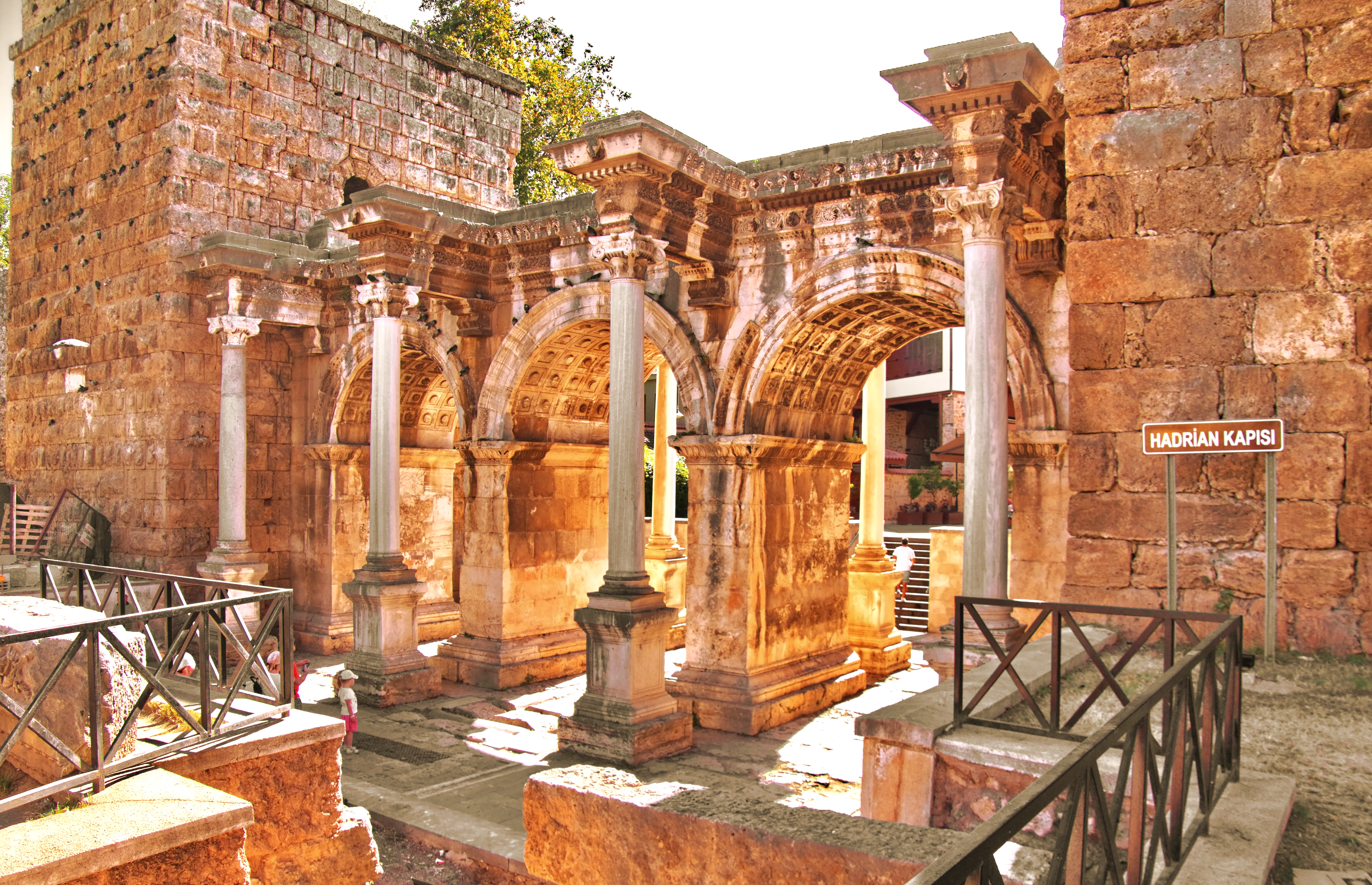
Hadrian's Gate side view

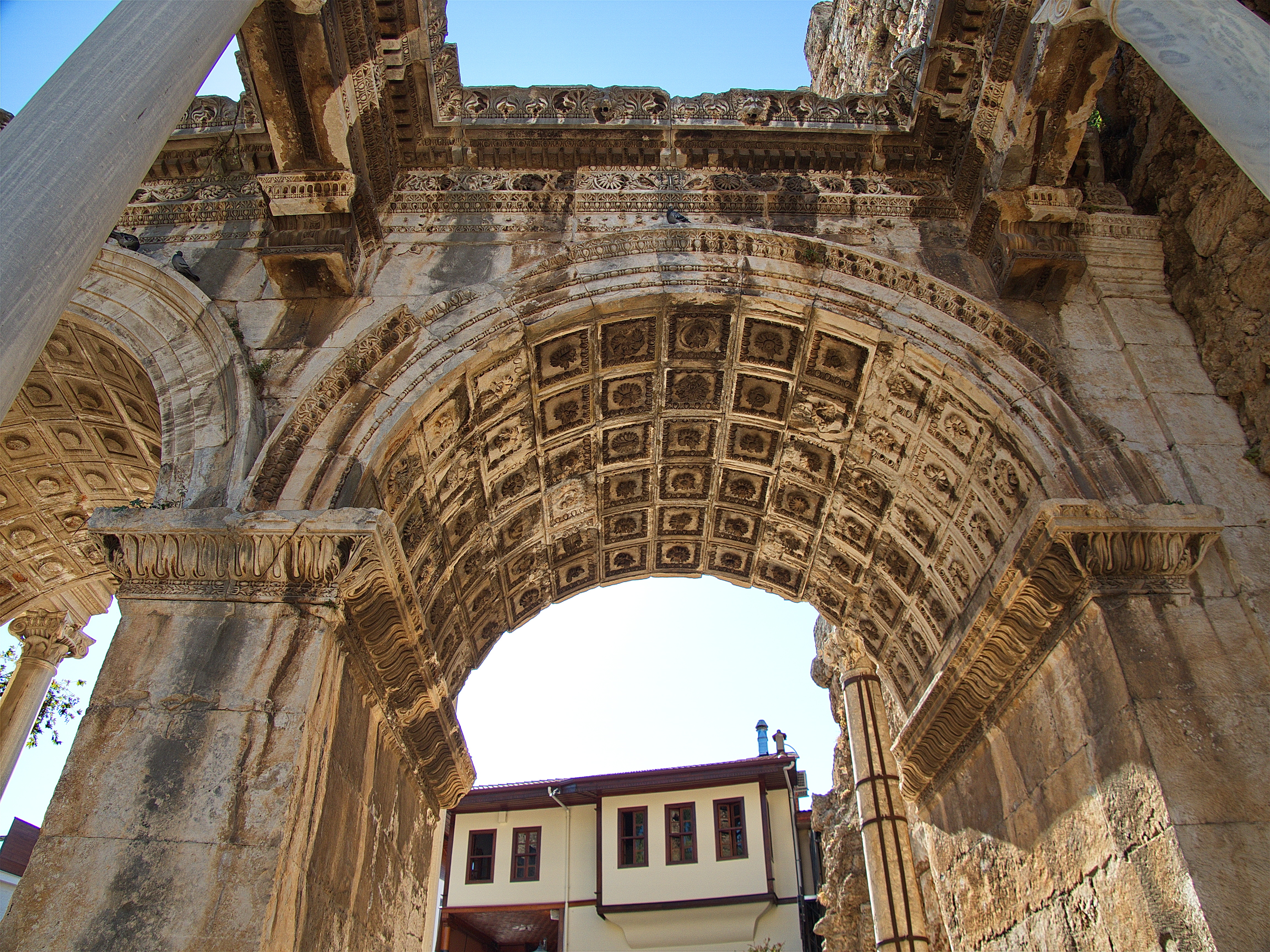
Hadrian's Gate arch detail

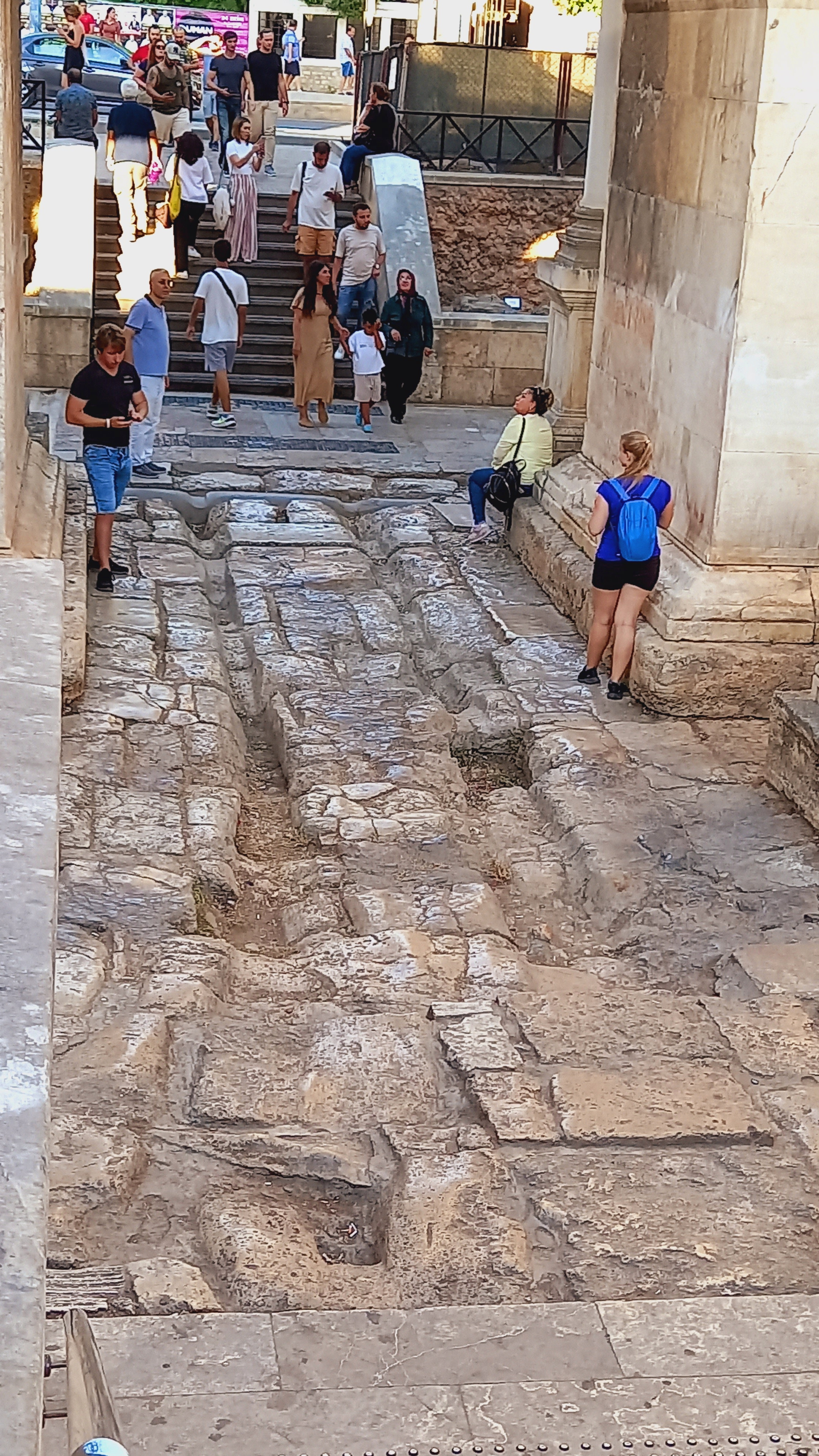
Hadrian's Gate walkway (vertical view)

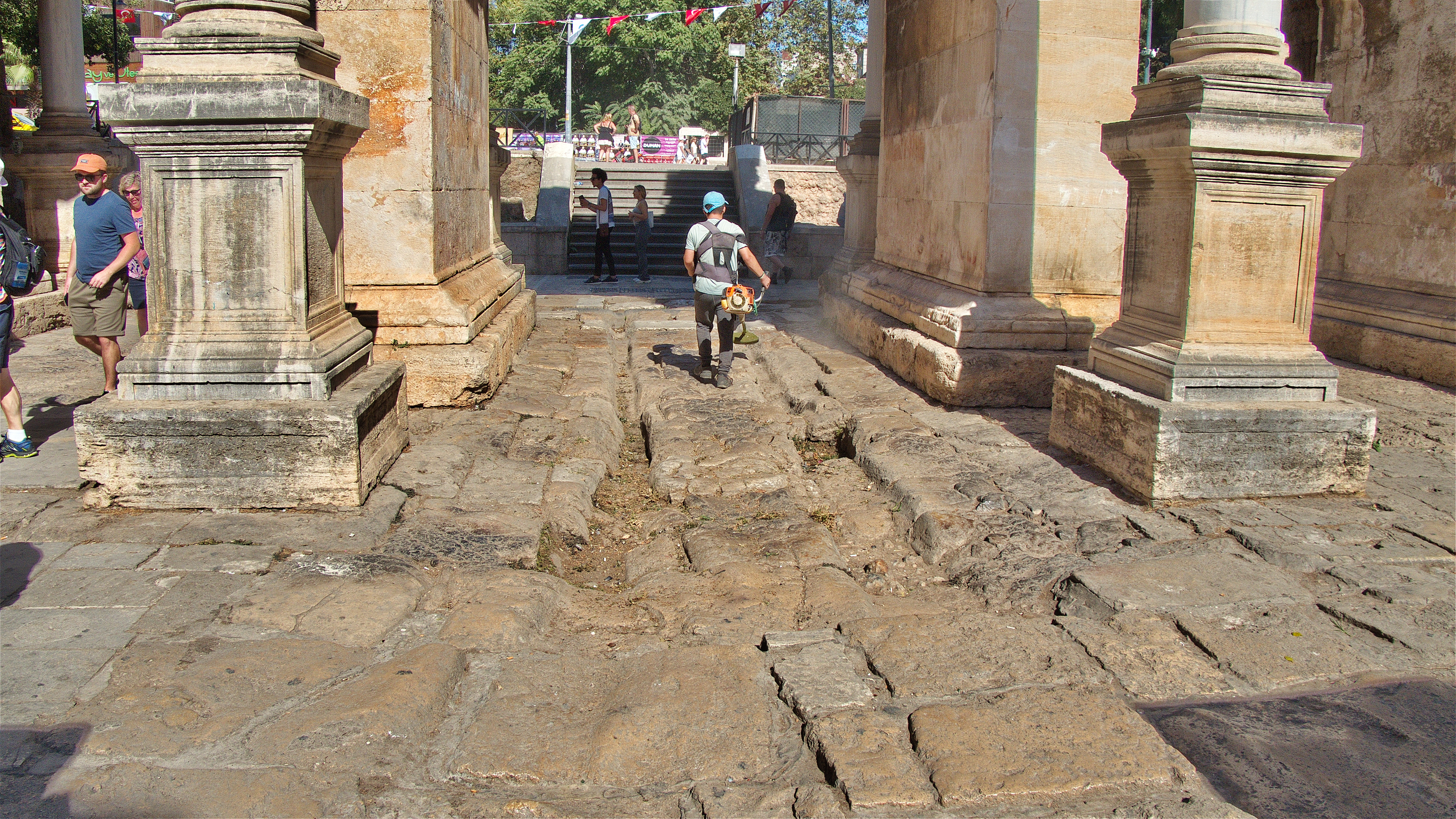
Hadrian's Gate walkway (horizontal view)

== See also ==
- Arch of Hadrian (Athens)
- Arch of Hadrian (Jerash)
- Arch of Hadrian (Capua)
- List of Roman triumphal arches
