= Burmali Minare Mosque =

Mosque in Amasya, Turkey

- Burmalı Minare Camii
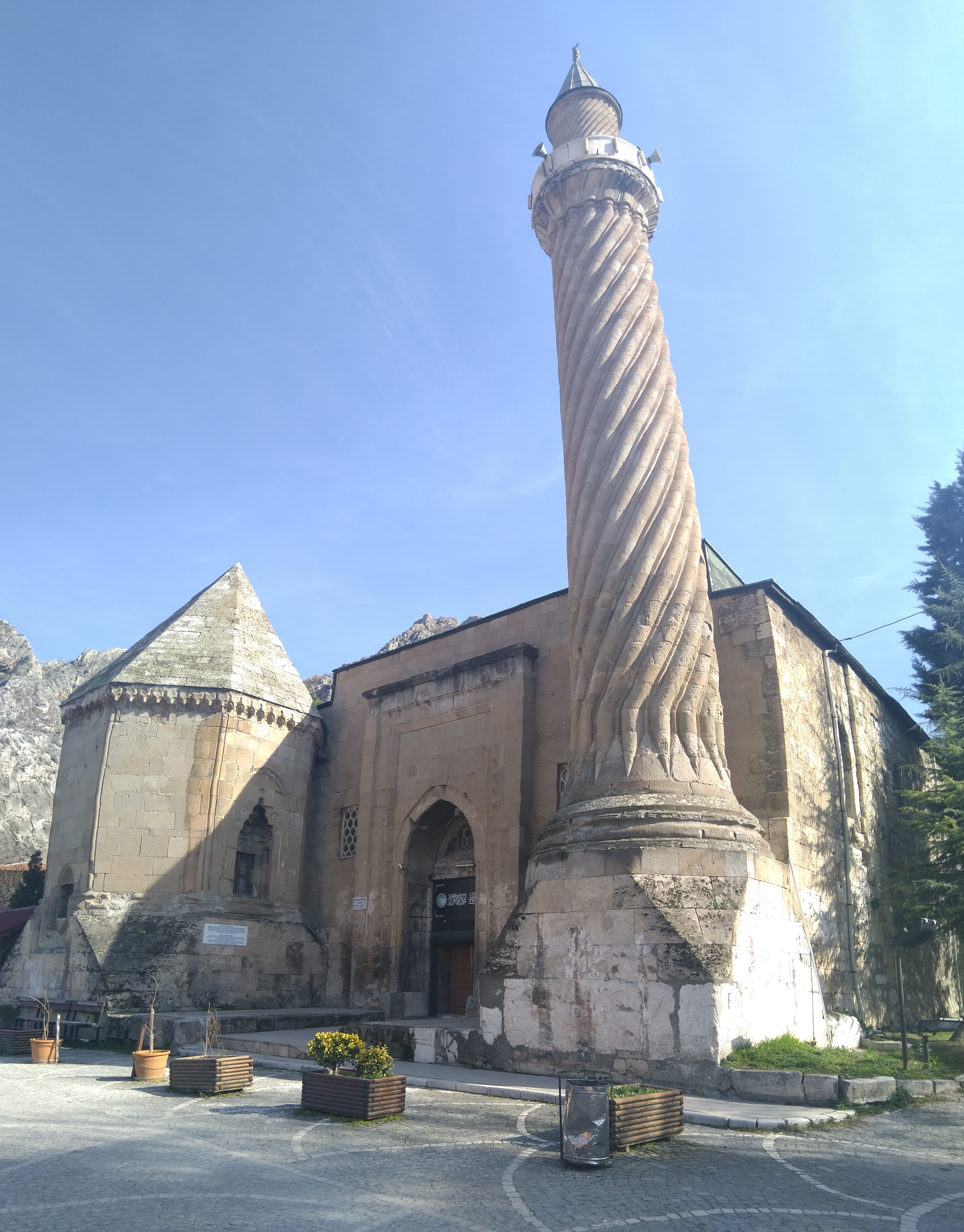

- Location within Turkey

Religion
- Affiliation: Islam
- Region: Central Anatolia

Location
- Municipality: Amasya
- Country: Turkey
- Interactive map of Burmali Minare Mosque
- Coordinates: 40.6501°N 35.8324°E

Architecture
- Type: mosque
- Style: Seljuk
- Groundbreaking: 1237
- Completed: 1247
- Minaret: 1

The Burmali Minare Mosque (Turkish: Burmalı Minare Camii; Burmali Minare means 'Spiral Minaret' in Turkish) is a historic 13th-century mosque in Amasya, Turkey. The mosque was built between 1237 and 1247 by the Seljuks.

== Building ==
The mosque, made of cut stone, is named after the elegant spiral carving on the minaret. There is also an adjoining Kumbet.
