= Anatolian Seljuk architecture =

Architecture associated with the Seljuks of Rum (Anatolia)

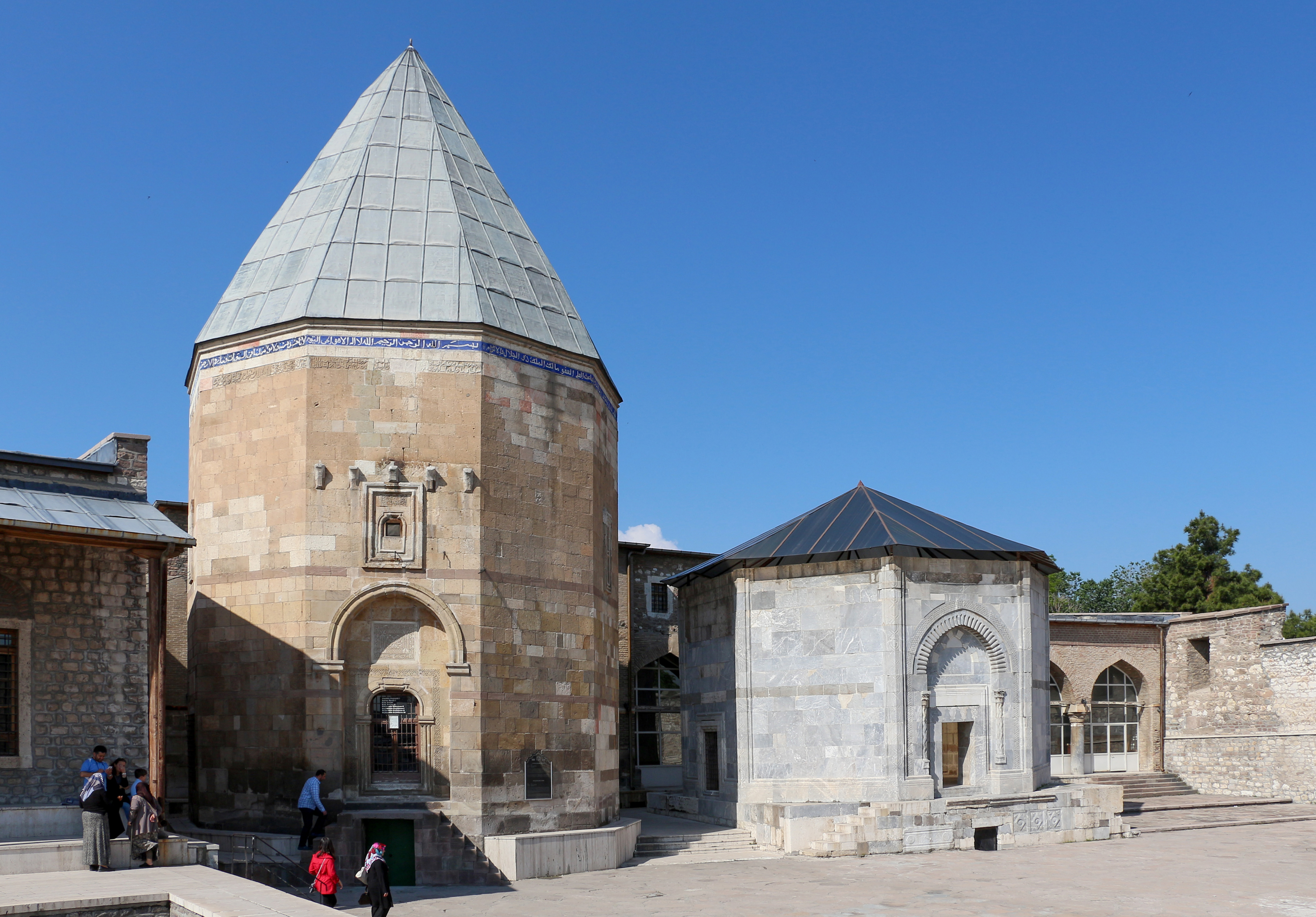
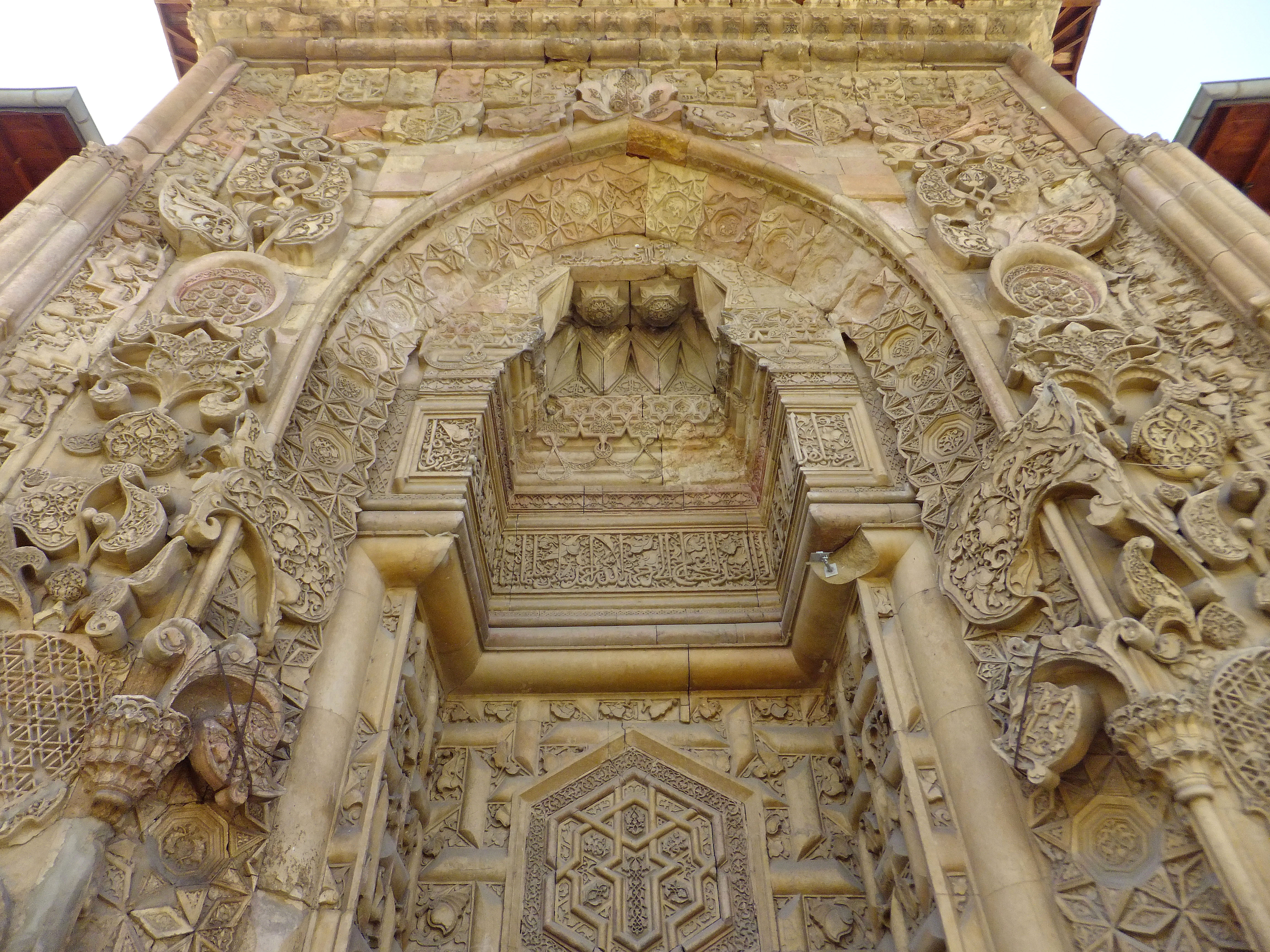
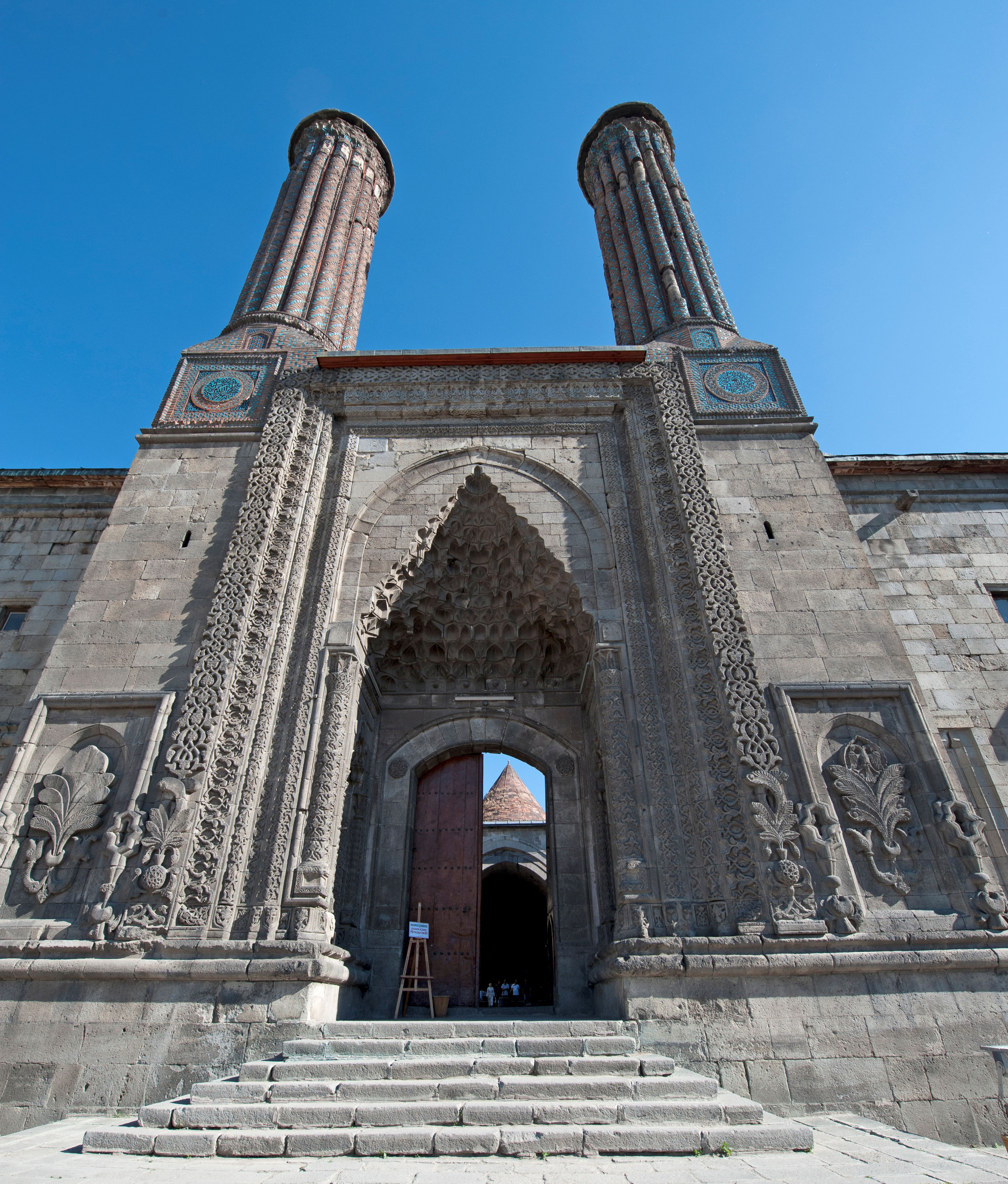
- From top to bottom: Tombs inside the Alâeddin Mosque in Konya (late 12th–early 13th century); Great Mosque of Divriği (1228–1229); Çifte Minareli Medrese in Erzurum (c. 1250)
- Years active: 11th–14th centuries
- Location: Anatolia and Northern Mesopotamia (present-day Turkey)

Anatolian Seljuk architecture, or simply Seljuk architecture, (Note: "Seljuk architecture" can also refer to Great Seljuk architecture under the Seljuk Empire (11th–12th centuries), found mostly in Iran, Central Asia, and some neighbouring regions.) refers to building activity that took place under the Sultanate of Rum (late 11th to 13th centuries), ruled by an offshoot of the Seljuk dynasty that emerged from the Great Seljuk Empire (11th–12th centuries) alongside various other local dynasties.

The Anatolian Seljuks patronized their own tradition of architecture whose surviving examples are generally found in present-day Turkey. Anatolian Seljuk architecture was eclectic and influenced by multiple traditions including Armenian, Byzantine, Iranian, and Syrian architecture. Unlike earlier Great Seljuk architecture to the east, their buildings were generally constructed in stone and featured significant stone-carved decoration in addition to tile decoration. While the Seljuk Sultanate declined and ended in the late 13th century, architecture continued to flourish and diversify under the smaller Beylik states that followed them in Anatolia, including the early Ottomans.

== Historical background ==
The Seljuk Turks created the Seljuk Empire in the 11th century, conquering all of Iran and other extensive territories from the Hindu Kush to eastern Anatolia and from Central Asia to the Persian Gulf. In 1071, following their victory over the Byzantine Empire at the Battle of Manzikert, Anatolia was opened up to Turkic settlers. The center of Seljuk architectural patronage was Iran, where the first permanent Seljuk edifices were constructed.

After the decline of the Great Seljuks (the main dynasty centered in Iran) in the late 12th century, various Turkic dynasties formed smaller states and empires across the Middle East. A branch of the Seljuk dynasty ruled a Sultanate in Anatolia (also known as the Anatolian Seljuks or Seljuks of Rum), the Zengids and Artuqids ruled in Northern Mesopotomia and nearby regions, and the Khwarazmian Empire ruled over Iran and Central Asia until the Mongol invasions of the 13th century. In addition to the Anatolian Seljuks, with their capital at Konya, other local dynasties and principalities existed across Anatolia such as the Danishmendids at Kayseri and Sivas, the Saltuqids at Erzurum, and the Mengujekids in Divriği and Erzincan. During the second half of the 12th century and the beginning of the 13th century, these other principalities were progressively conquered or assimilated by the Seljuks of Konya. The Danishmendid realm was annexed in 1178, the Saltuqid realm was annexed in 1202, and the Menjukids became an allied local dynasty related to the Konya Seljuks by marriage.

The golden age of the Anatolian Seljuk empire followed in the early 13th century. During the first half of their rule, the Anatolian Seljuks did not engage in much construction activity as they contended with military conflicts and tried to establish themselves. After attaining political stability, they directed more of their energy towards building and developed a distinct architectural style. Under the patronage of the Anatolian Seljuks, the Artuqids, and other local dynasties, both indigenous Christian architectural traditions – such as Byzantine, Armenian, and Georgian – and regional Islamic architectural traditions – such as those of Syria, Iraq, Iran, and Central Asia – were synthesized into a highly inventive and original style, with further local variations under some dynasties.

Anatolian Seljuk architecture is concentrated in major cities of the period such as Konya (their main capital), Kayseri, Sivas, Niğde, and Erzurum, but Seljuk works can be found in almost any major Anatolian town in central and eastern Anatolia. Along the coasts, the Seljuks occupied Antalya and Sinop and built a new fortified port at Alanya. Smaller Turkish principalities in Anatolia – such as the Danishmendids and the Saltuqids who were conquered by the Seljuks – also contributed to the architecture of Anatolia during this era. The Zengids and Artuqids, who had initially served the Great Seljuks before controlling their own realms, also turned cities like Mosul, Diyarbakir, Hasankeyf, and Mardin into important centers of architectural development that had a long-term influence in the wider regions of Anatolia and Syria.

Anatolian Seljuk authority declined after their defeat at the hands of the Mongols in the Battle of Köse Dağ in 1243. In eastern Anatolia, the Mongol Ilkhanids ruled indirectly through Seljuk vassals at first, before taking direct control after 1308. Smaller Turkic principalities and emirates emerged locally again, known collectively as the Beyliks. Despite this weakening of Seljuk power in the thirteenth century, their intense building activity continued for some time. Moreover, the Seljuk tradition of architecture largely persisted and continued to evolve under new rulers and patrons. The attachment of a large part of Anatolia to the Ilkhanid Empire may have also renewed artistic connections with Iran, the center of that empire. For example, the construction of monumental portals flanked by two minarets is attested in earlier Iranian Seljuk monuments but did not appear in Anatolian Seljuk monuments until after the Mongol conquest. In central and eastern Anatolia, under dynasties like the Karamanids and the Eretnids, architecture remained fairly traditional. In western Anatolia, Turkish principalities such as the Saruhanids, the Beylik of Aydın, and the Menteşe Beylik all existed on the Byzantine frontier, in a region with many ancient Greek and Roman monuments. As a result, architecture here experimented with both Seljuk elements and Byzantine/Mediterranean traditions. One of these local Turkish dynasties, the Ottomans, eventually went on to establish the Ottoman Empire and developed their own style of Ottoman architecture.

== General characteristics ==
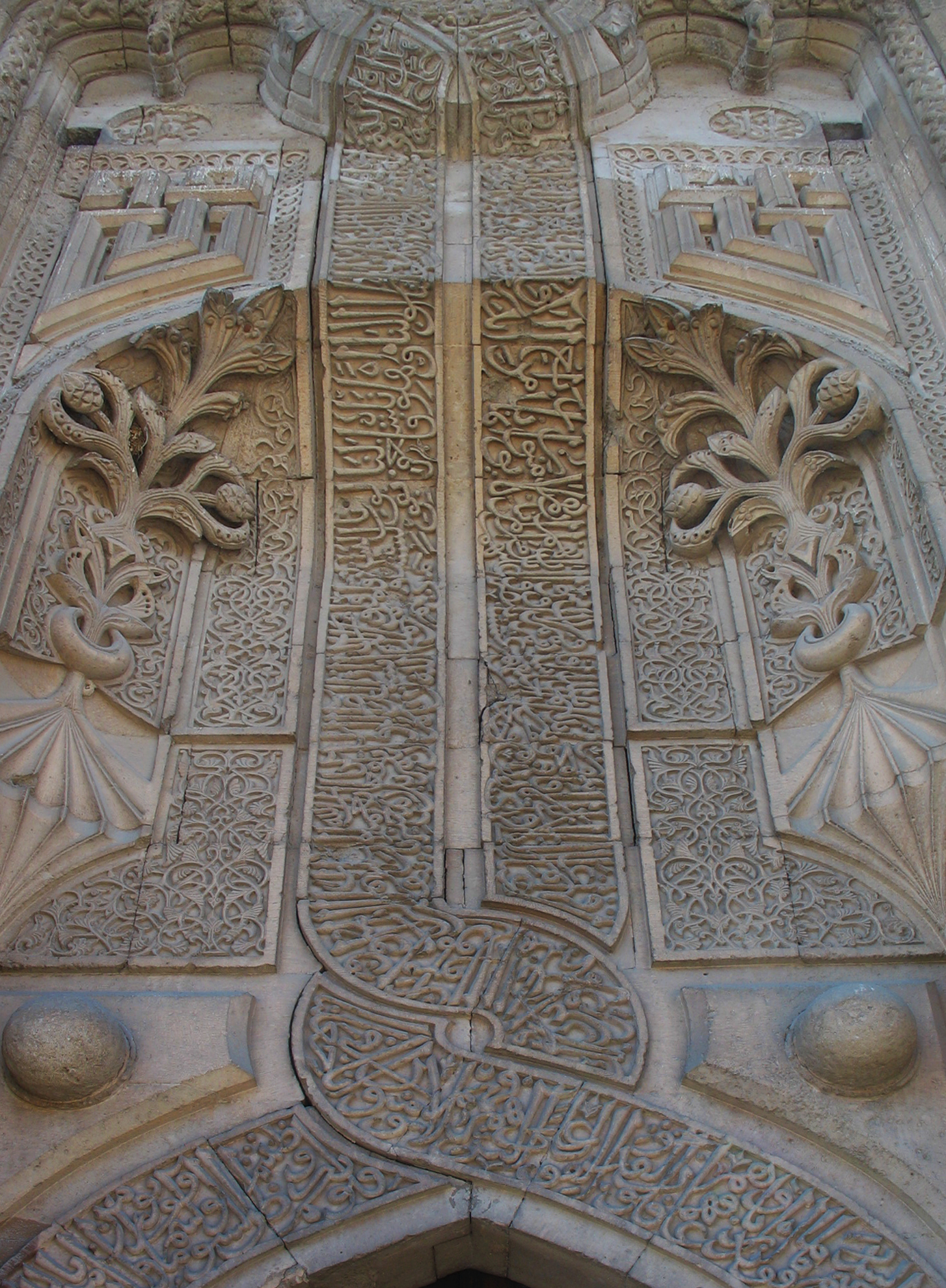
Stone-carved decoration in the entrance portal of the Ince Minareli Medrese in Konya (c. 1265)

The Anatolian Seljuks ruled a territory that was multi-ethnic and only newly settled by Muslims. As a result, their architecture was eclectic and incorporated influences from other cultures. The fluidity of society on the frontier of the Islamic world, along with the fact that the Seljuks enjoyed only a short period of stable rule before the Mongol invasion, prevented them from developing a unified "imperial" style of architecture. While Konya was a vibrant center of patronage in the early 13th century, it did not necessarily impose its own artistic styles on other cities. Instead, architecture across Anatolia was strongly influenced by the creativity of local craftsmen and by mobile workshops of artisans who travelled the region in search of patrons.

In general, Seljuk architecture combined forms and techniques from Byzantine, Armenian, and Georgian architecture with those of Iran, Syria, Iraq and Central Asia. Seljuk architecture was influenced by Armenian architecture due to the employ of Muslim architects originating from historical Armenia and of Armenian architects and masons. Persian influences also continued to have a strong effect. The influence of other cultures on the Anatolian Seljuks can also be seen by their use of spolia. There are examples of Anatolian Seljuk architecture using spolia material quite visibly in public buildings located at the centers and entrances of cities, such as at the Atabey Ertokuş Madrasa in Atabey (in southwestern Turkey). The high quality of spolia in certain cases, combined with earlier Byzantine laws that prevented important public buildings from being demolished, contributed to preserving elements of ancient architectural traditions.

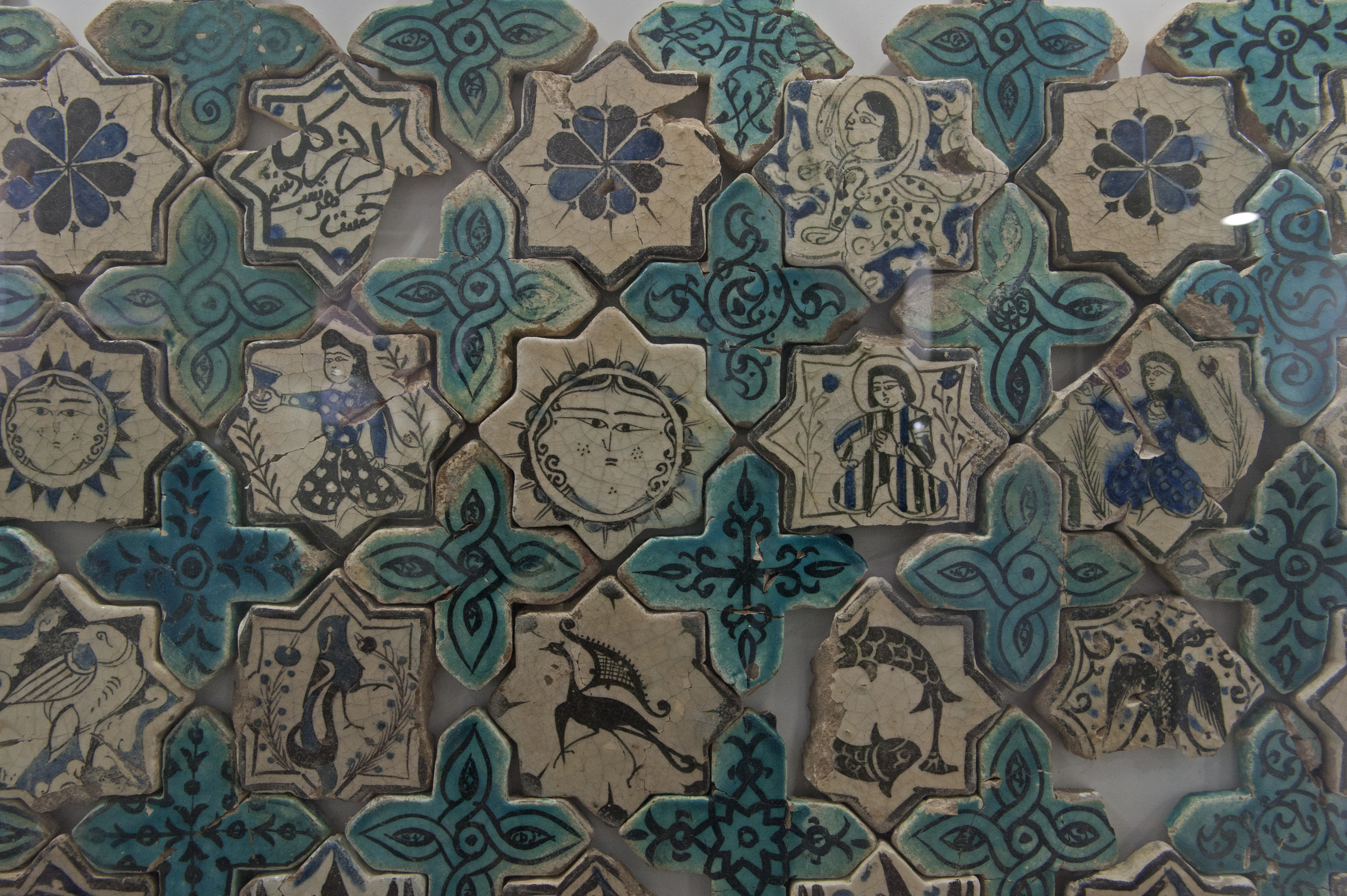
Seljuk mosaic tile decoration from the Kubadabad Palace (early 13th-century Anatolia)

Most Anatolian Seljuk works are of dressed stone, with brick reserved for minarets. The use of stone in Anatolia is the biggest difference with Seljuk buildings in Iran, which are largely made of bricks. This also resulted in more of their monuments being preserved up to modern times. In their construction of caravanserais, madrasas and mosques, the Anatolian Seljuks translated the Iranian Seljuk architecture of bricks and plaster into the use of stone.

Decoration in Anatolian Seljuk architecture was concentrated on certain elements like entrance portals, windows, and the mihrabs of mosques. Stone-carving was one of the most accomplished mediums of decoration, with motifs ranging from earlier Iranian stucco motifs to local Byzantine and Armenian motifs. Muqarnas ("honeycomb"-like geometric sculpting) was also used. The madrasas of Sivas and the Ince Minareli Medrese in Konya are among the most notable examples, while the Great Mosque and Hospital complex of Divriği is distinguished by the most extravagant and eclectic high-relief stone decoration around its entrance portals and its mihrab. Syrian-style ablaq striped marble also appears on the entrance portal of the Karatay Medrese and the Alâeddin Mosque in Konya. Although tilework was commonly used in Iran, Anatolian architecture innovated in the use of tile revetments to cover entire surfaces independently of other forms of decoration, as seen in the Karatay Medrese.

The culture of late medieval Anatolia heavily emphasized hospitality, which pushed the development of buildings such as caravanserais, Sufi lodges, and other complexes that provided shelter, food, and other services to guests and travelers. The similar layouts and features of Sufi lodges, madrasas, and caravanserais are indicative that, in practice, these different types of institutions were multi-functional and overlapped in their uses. Caravanserais were primarily responsible for serving these functions in the countryside, while other building types were characteristic of urban centres. For example, madrasas were formally designated for the teaching of orthodox Sunni Islamic law and jurisprudence, but the growing influence of Sufism (mystical Islam) meant that they also ended up hosting Sufi activities as well. Especially from the second half of the 13th century onwards, a degree of functional overlap thus existed between madrasas and Sufi establishments, not unlike similar developments under the contemporary Mamluk Sultanate in Egypt.

== Mosques ==
Anatolian Seljuk mosque architecture was a combination of Turkish-Islamic culture and Anatolian traditions. The four-iwan plan, developed under the earlier Seljuks in Iran, did not appear in Anatolian Seljuk mosques. The congregational mosques (also known as an Ulu Cami or "great mosque") built by the Anatolian Seljuks included more conservative hypostyle constructions alongside less traditional floor plans. Hypostyle structures had wide halls with rows of columns or pillars supporting the ceiling. Major examples of this include the Great Mosque of Sivas (1197) and the Alaeddin Mosque of Konya (built over multiple periods between 1156 and 1235, with later additions). Most of the twelfth-century great mosques in both the southeastern and northeastern regions of the Seljuq empire place a dome in front of the mihrab. The minarets of Seljuk mosques were built of stone or brick, usually resting on a stone base, and typically had a cylindrical or polygonal shaft that is less slender than later Ottoman minarets. They were sometimes embellished with decorative brickwork or glazed ceramic decoration up the level of their balconies.

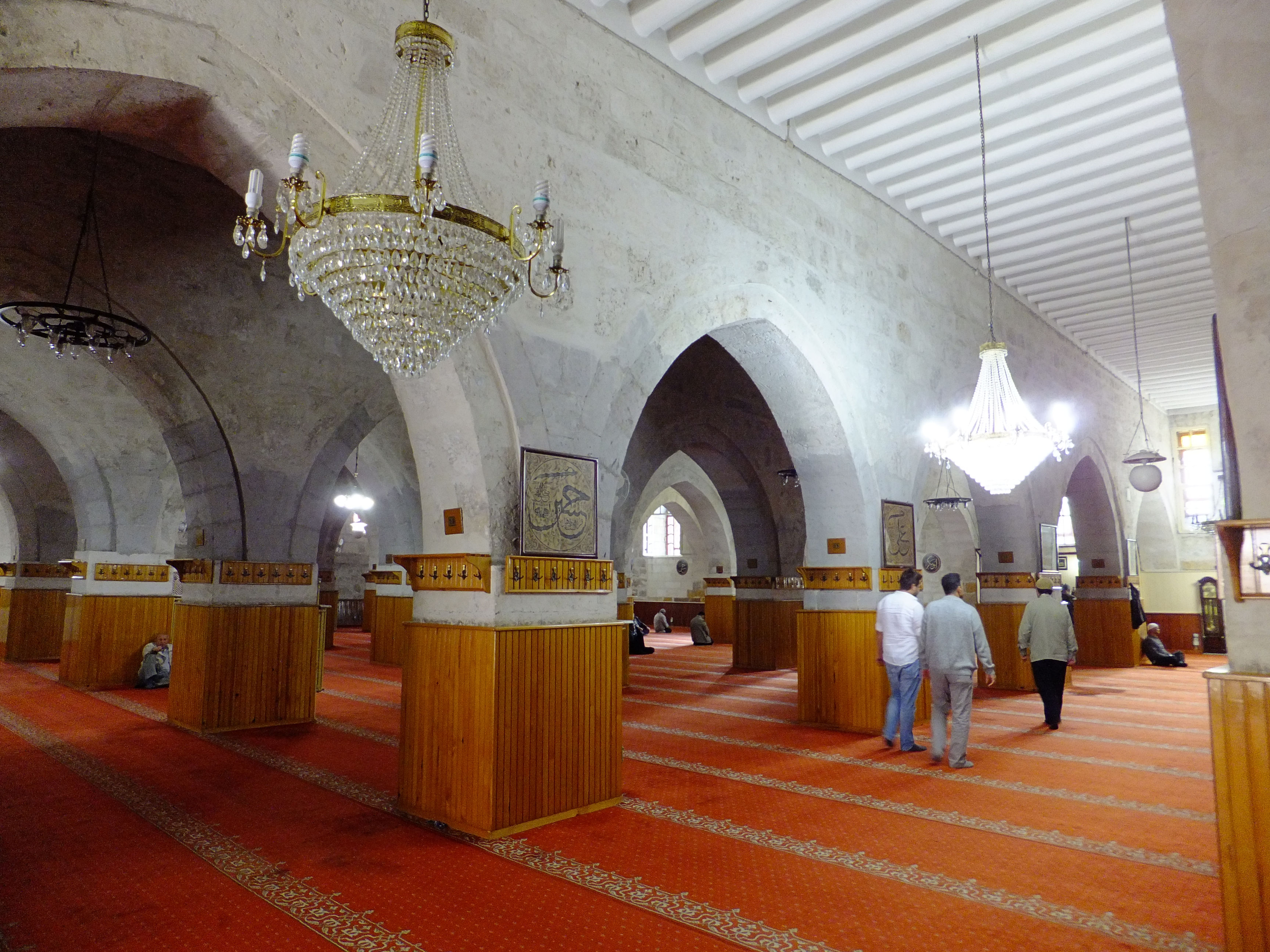
Interior of the Great Mosque of Sivas (1197)

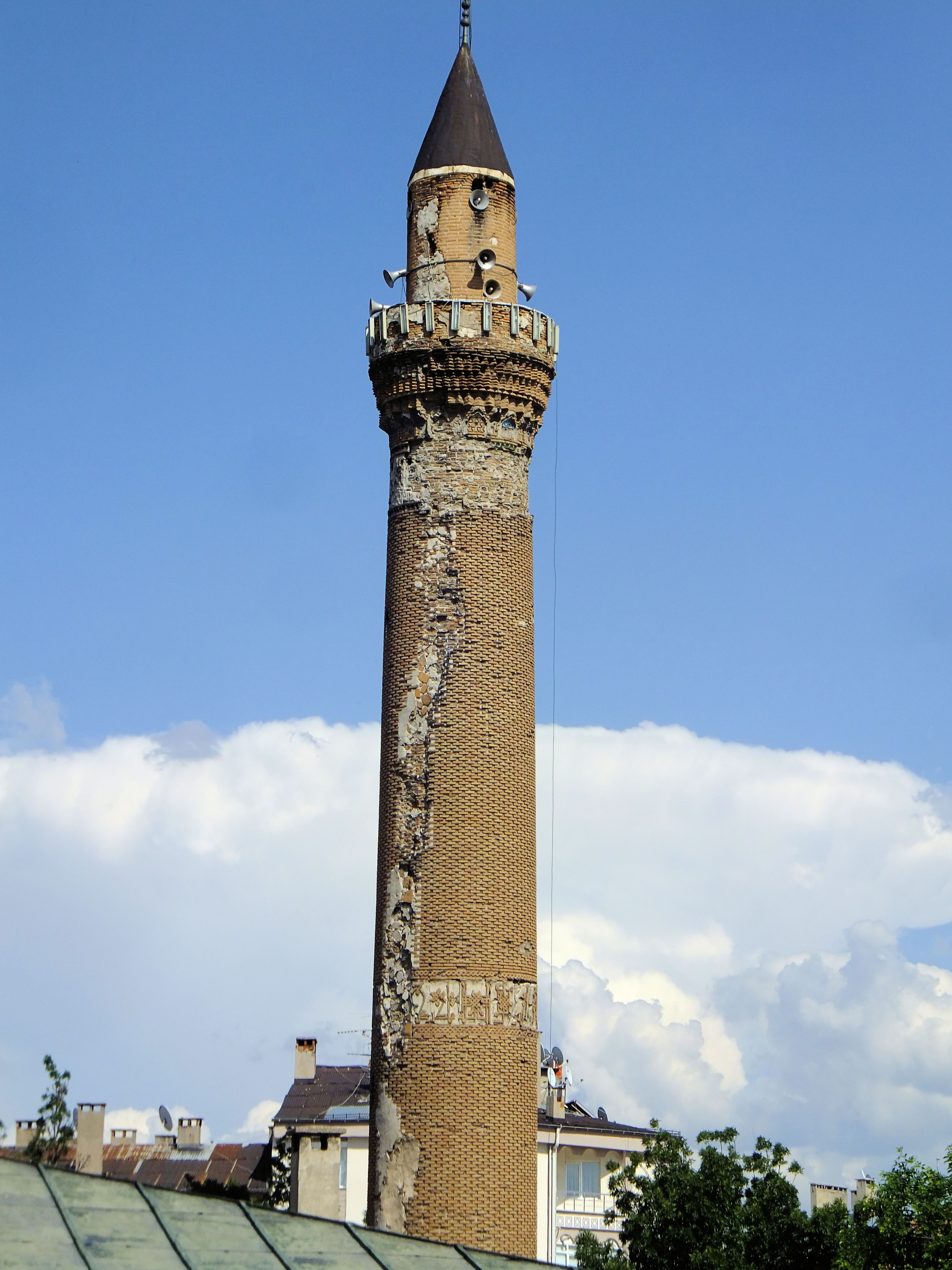
Minaret of the Great Mosque of Sivas (13th century)

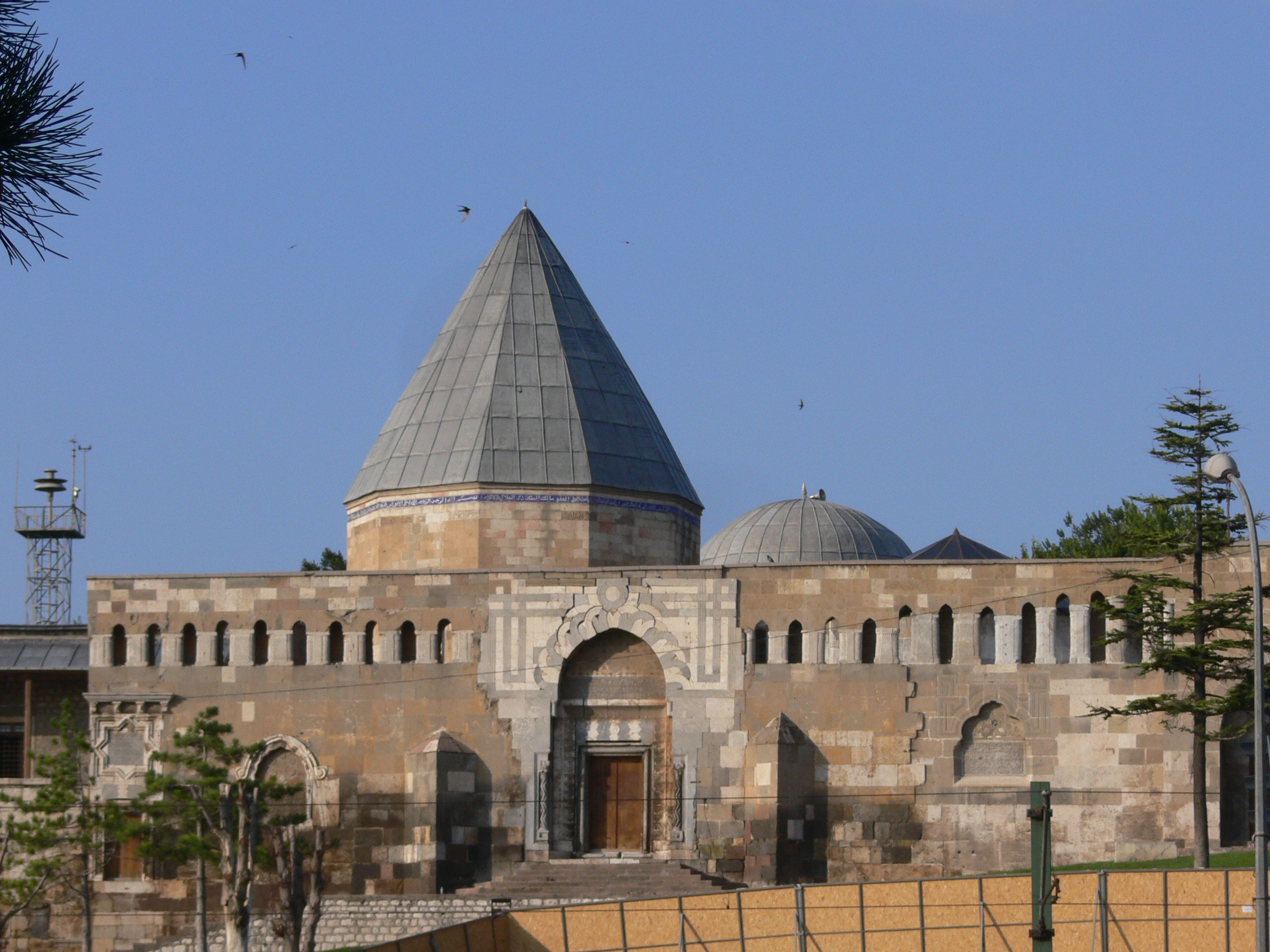
Exterior of the Alâeddin Mosque in Konya (12th-13th centuries)

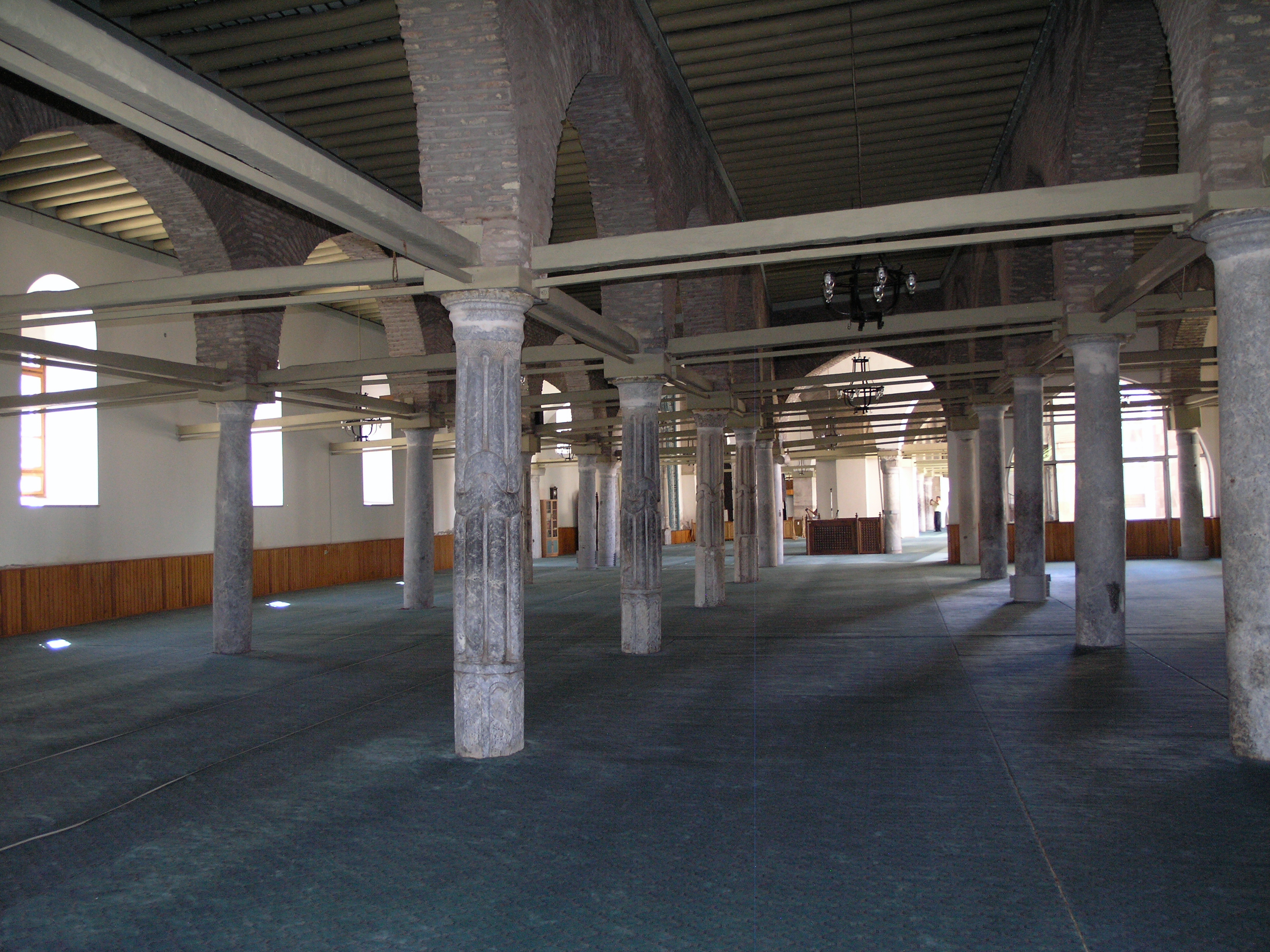
Hypostyle interior of the Alâeddin Mosque in Konya

The smallest type of mosque is the mescid (from Arabic masjid). It was developed during the thirteenth century in central Anatolia and was composed of a square chamber topped by a dome. This type of mosque could be a freestanding structure or it could be integrated into a larger building. Another type of small mosque is the citadel mosque, or kale mescidi, which was developed in eastern Turkey during the twelfth century. These citadel mosques had more involved plans compared to other small mosques, with an interior divided into several aisles that were covered with barrel vaults and cross-vaults. Examples of this type are the citadel mosques in Divriği (1180–1181) and Erzurum (12th century).

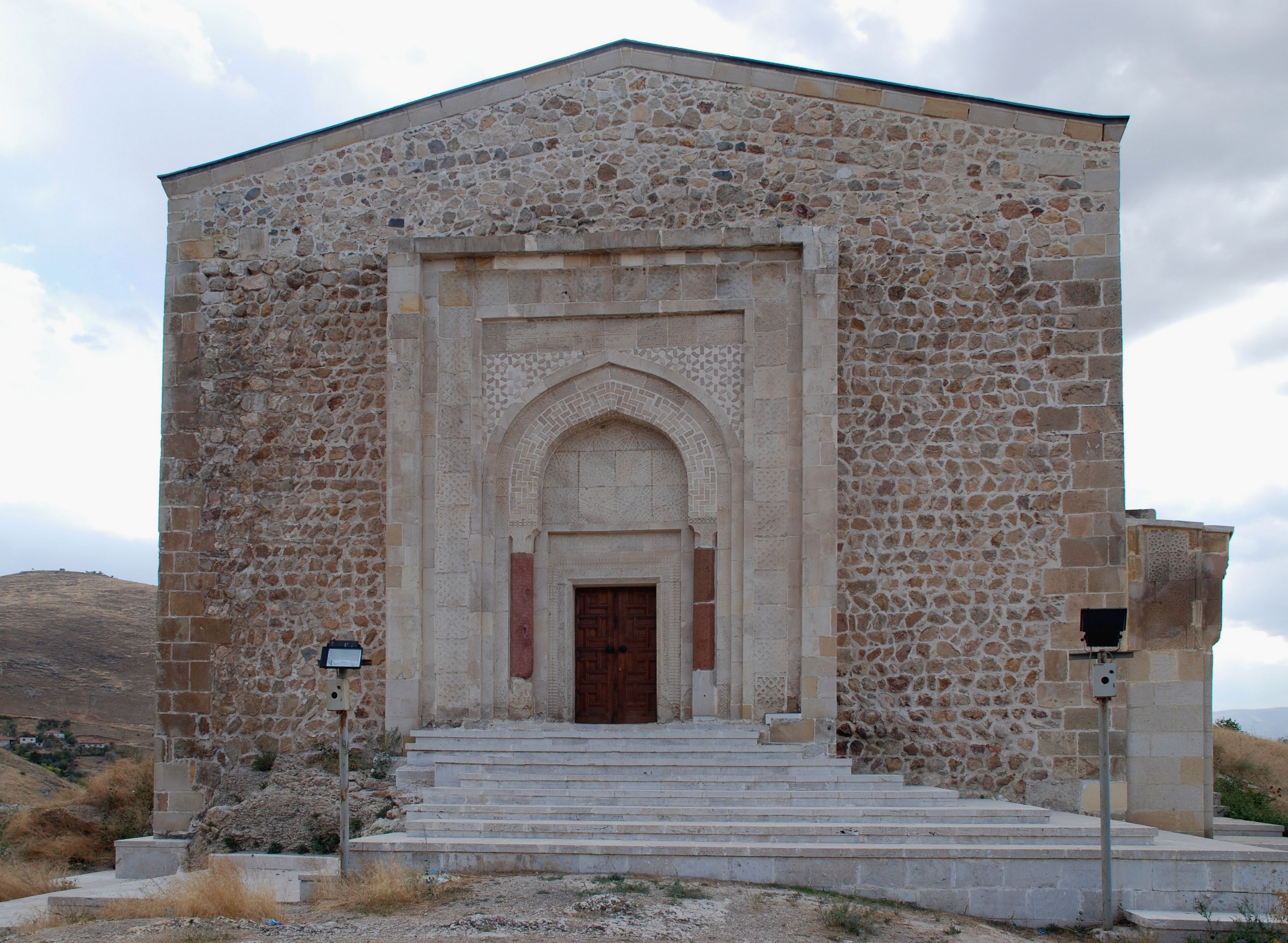
Citadel Mosque in Divriği (1180–1181)

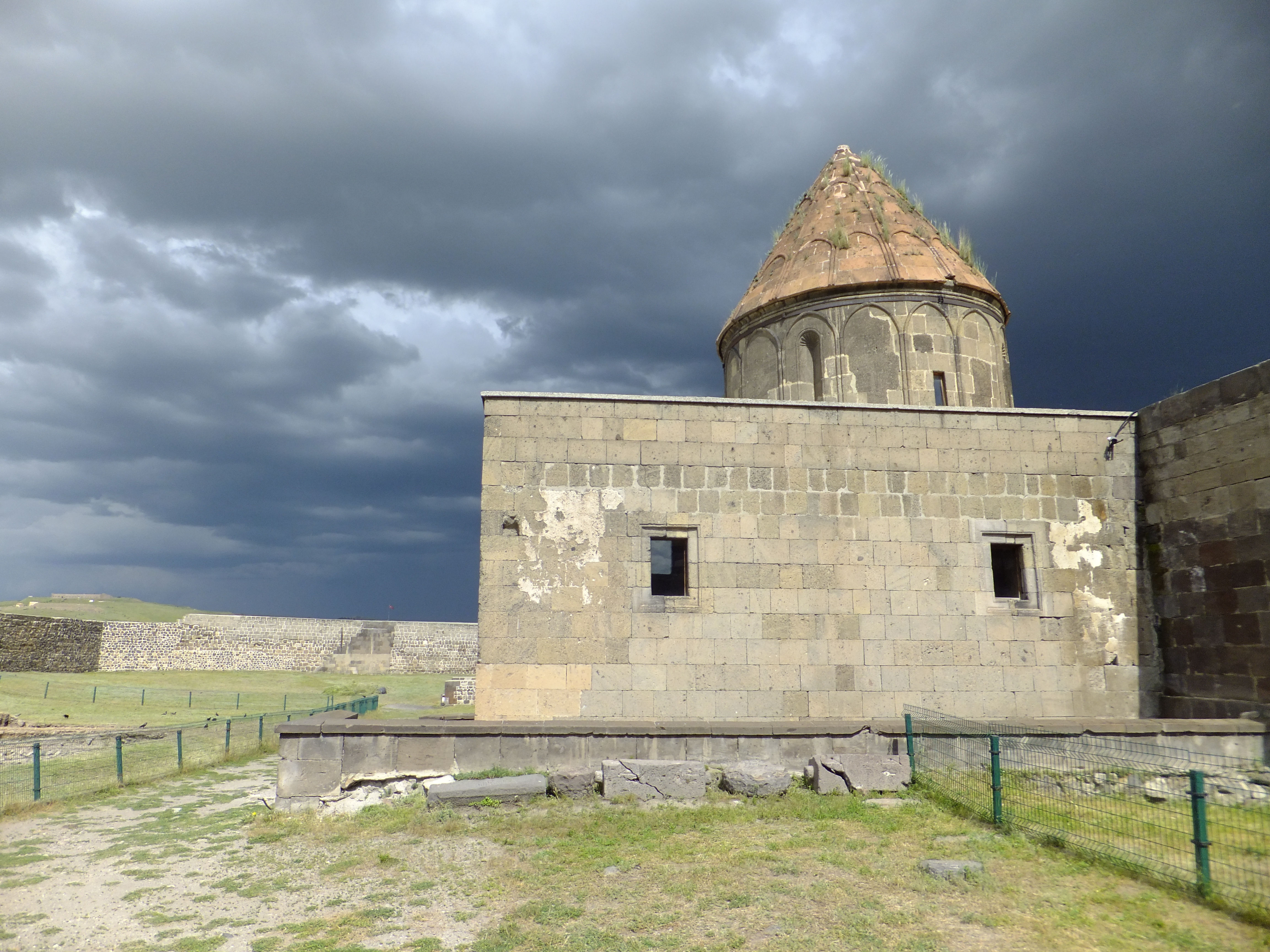
The Citadel Mosque in Erzurum (12th century)

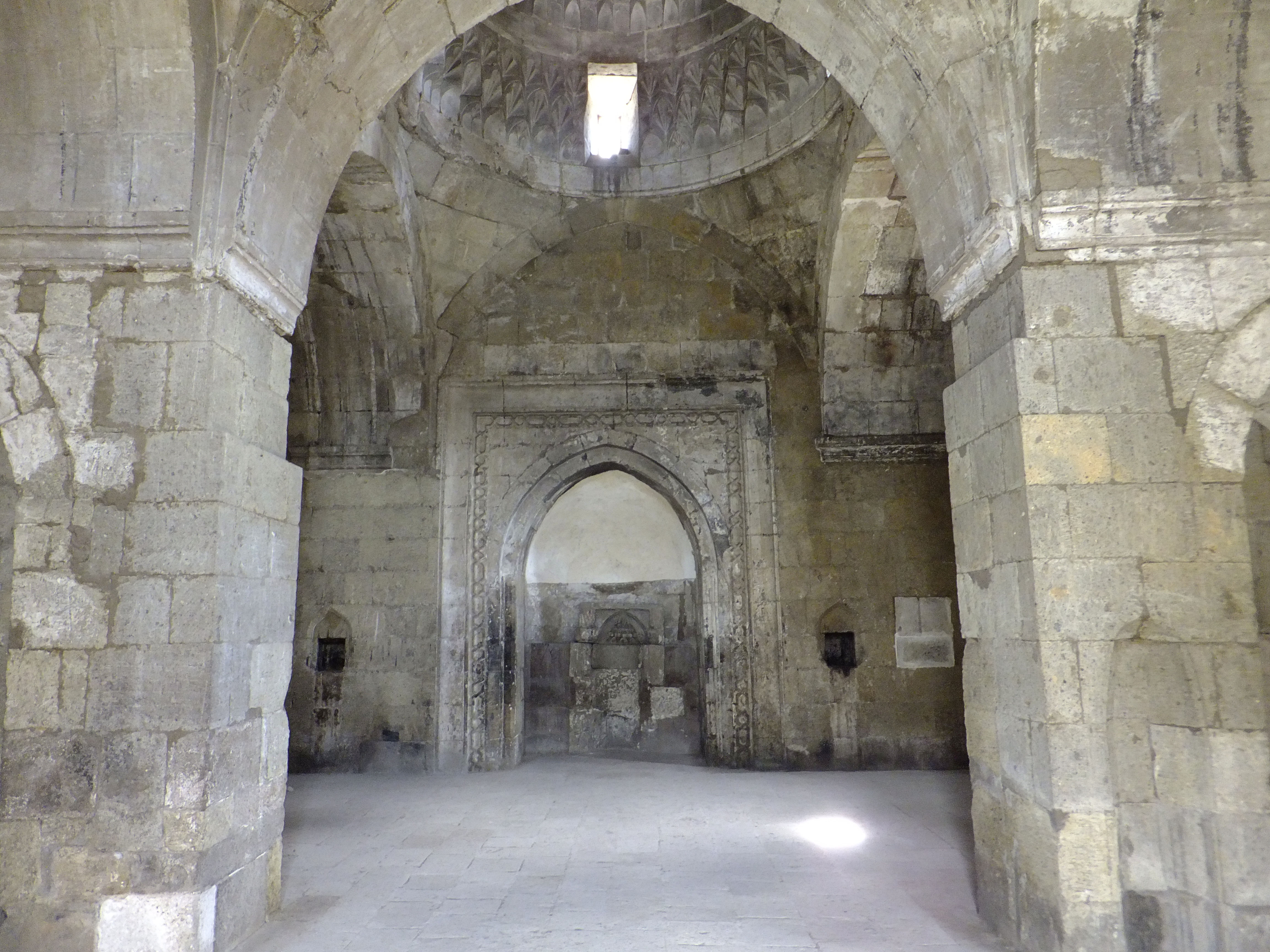
Interior of the Citadel Mosque in Erzurum

"Basilical"-type mosques were also built, so-called because they have a more linear layout with their long axis aligned with the mihrab and the qibla (direction of prayer). This type has its antecedents in the citadel mosques of the 12th century and may have been influenced by local church architecture. More developed examples occur in the 13th century, such as the Alaeddin Mosque of Niğde (1223), which has three "naves" running length-wise towards the qibla wall and three domes covering the bays in front of this wall. The Burmali Minare Mosque and Gök Madrasa Mosque, both built in Amasya in the 13th century, also have basilical plans but in these cases the three domes are placed in a line over the central nave perpendicular to the qibla wall. The placement of domes in this fashion accentuated the existing tradition of placing a dome in front of the mihrab.

The Great Mosque of Divriği (1228–1229) has a layout that can be described as either hypostyle or basilical. It consists of three naves, with the central nave in front of the mihrab being wider than the others. A dome covers a square bay in front of the mihrab and another dome pierced with an oculus covers the bay in the middle of the mosque. Similar features can be found in the Mosque of Hunat Hatun (or Huand Hatun) in Kayseri, which is part of a larger complex dating to 1237–1238. This mosque has a central nave which is emphasized by two domes (one in front of the mihrab and another in the middle of the mosque) but has a larger number of naves or aisles. The side naves run parallel to the qibla wall and perpendicular to the central nave. The dome in the middle of the mosque is a 19th-century construction covering what was originally small court open to the sky. The same arrangement with two domes, one of which was originally a small open court, is found in the Great Mosque (Ulu Cami) of Kayseri, which was founded in 1135 by the Danishmendids but restored and modified multiple times in later centuries, including by the Seljuks in 1205–1206.

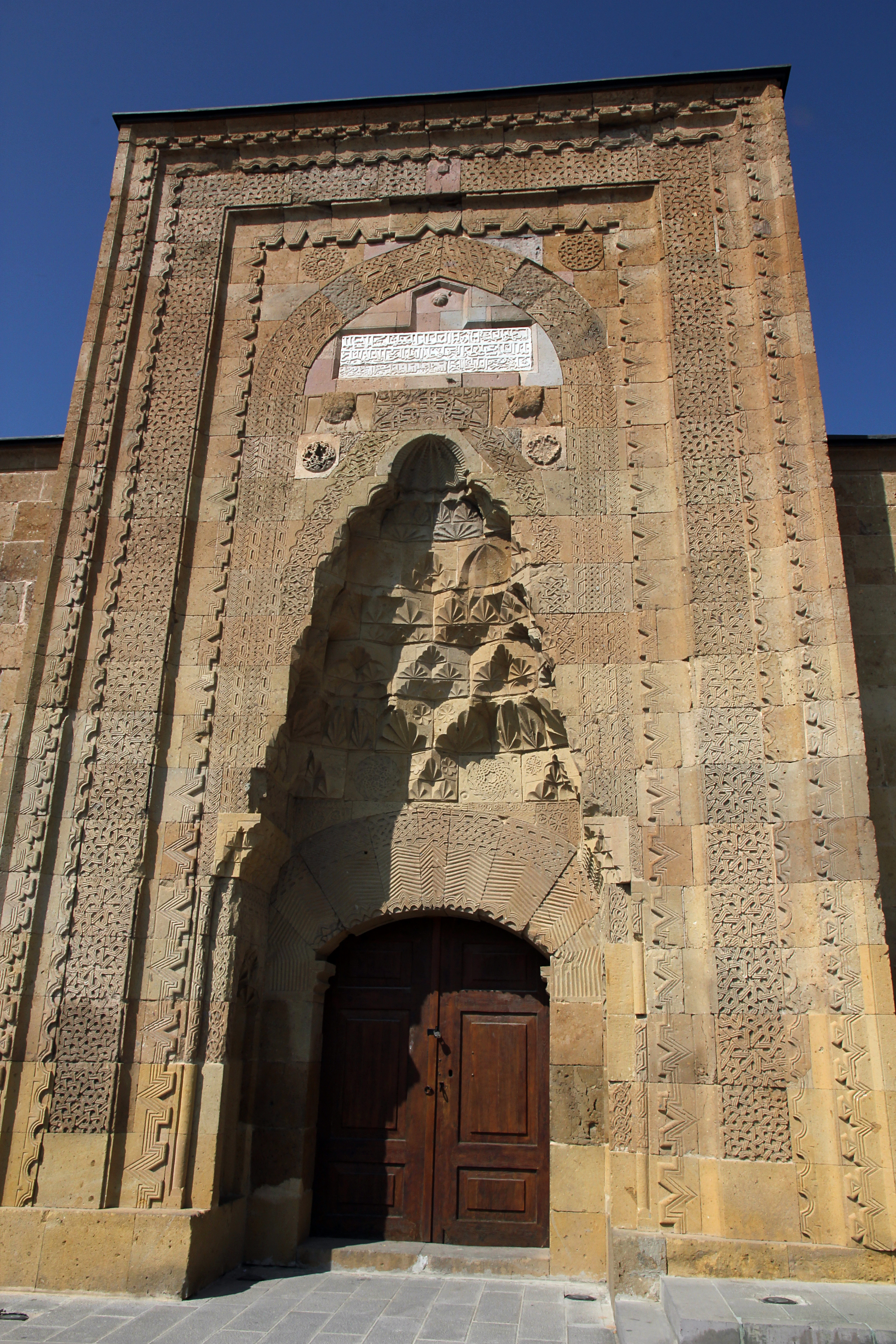
Entrance portal of the Alaeddin Mosque of Niğde (1223)

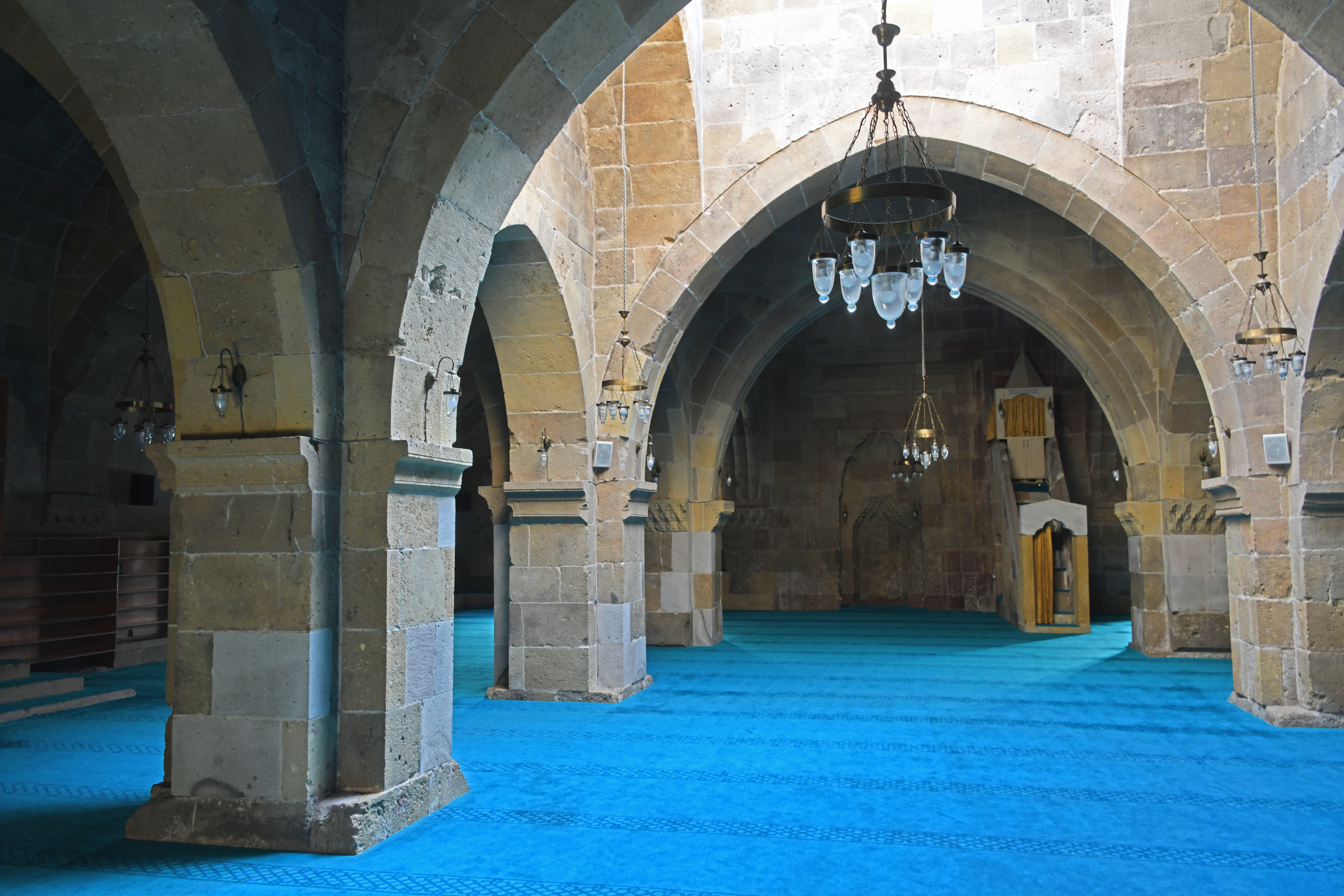
Interior of the Alaeddin Mosque of Niğde

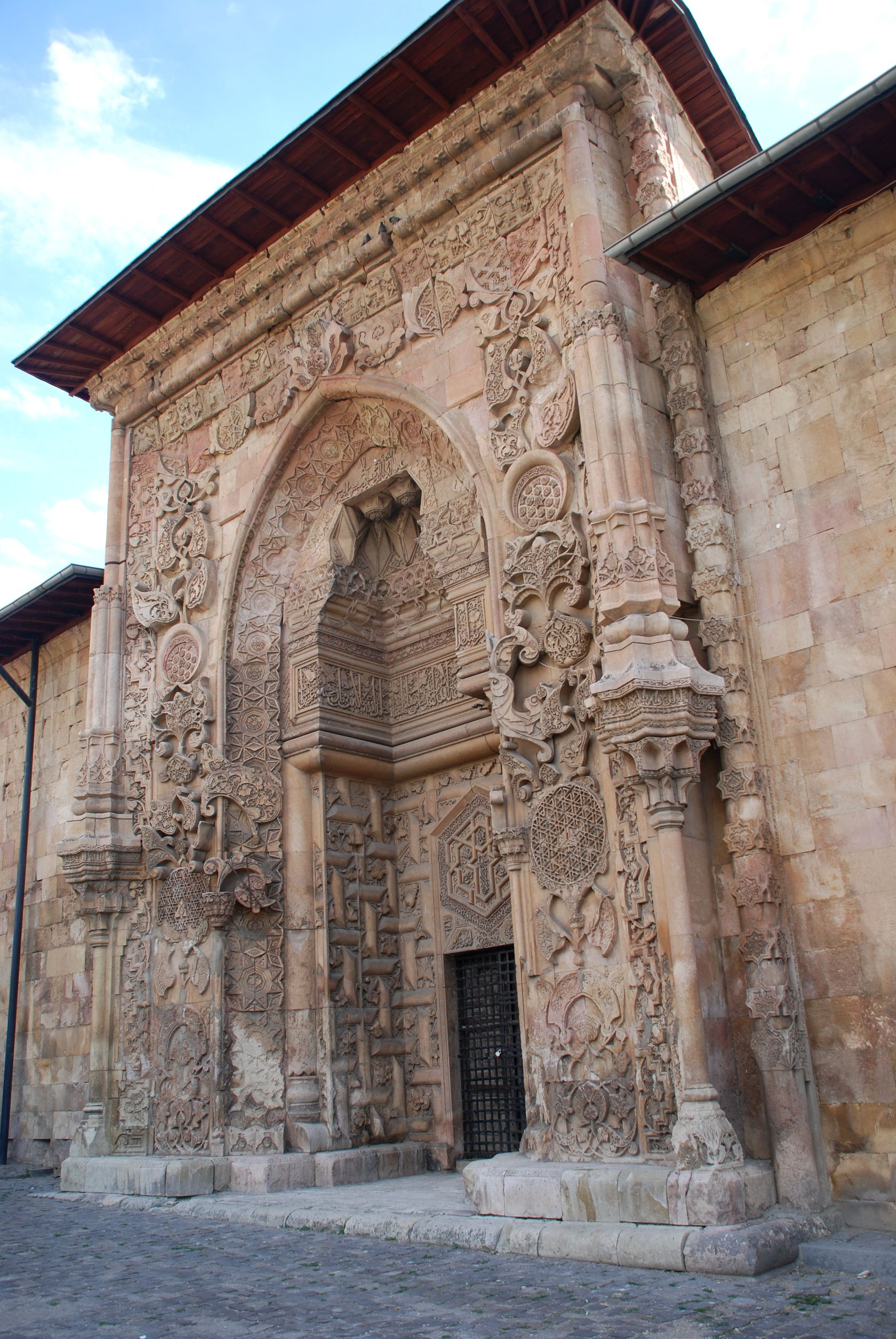
The portal of the Divriği Great Mosque in Divriği (1228–1229)

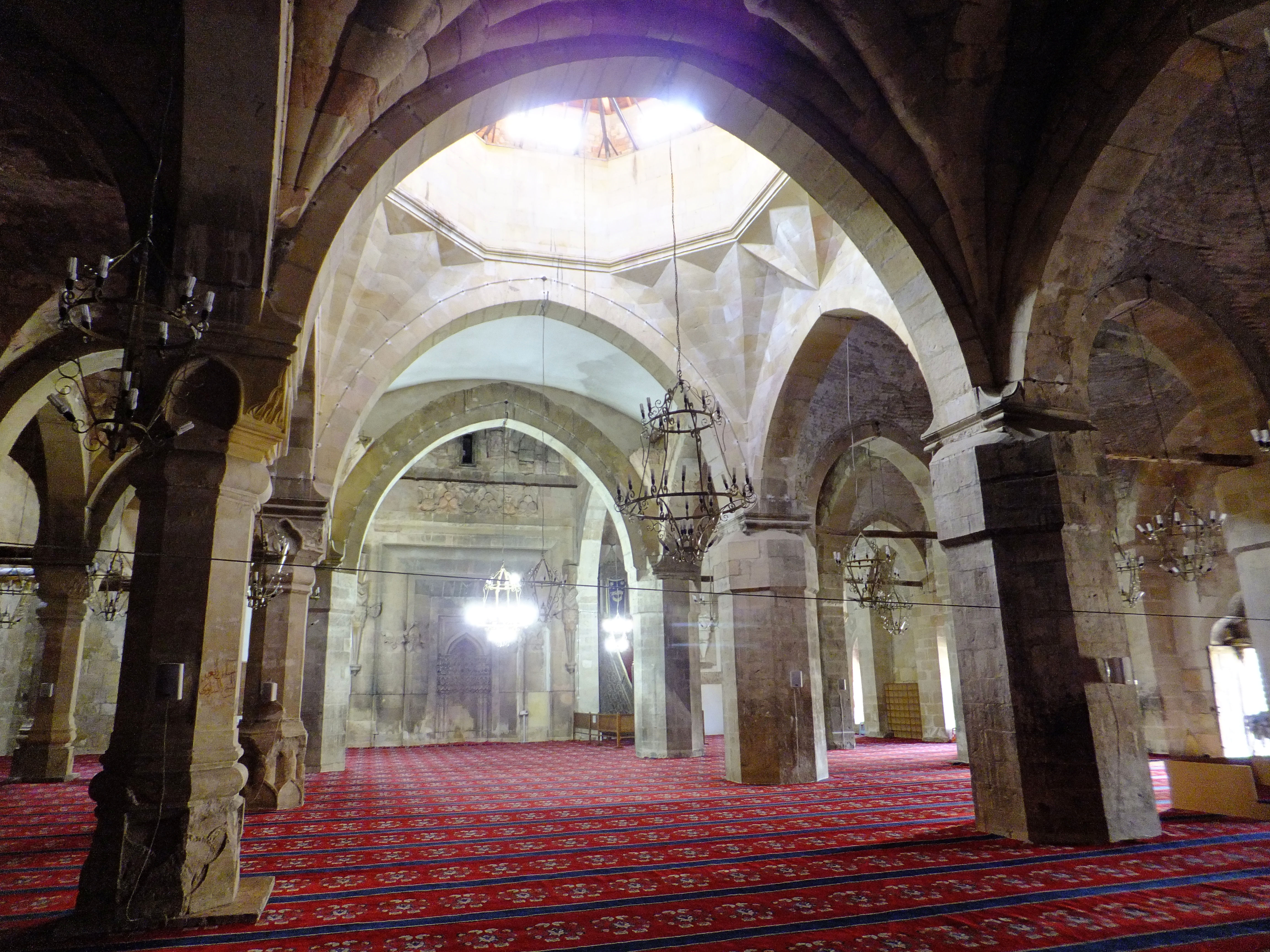
Interior of the Divriği Great Mosque

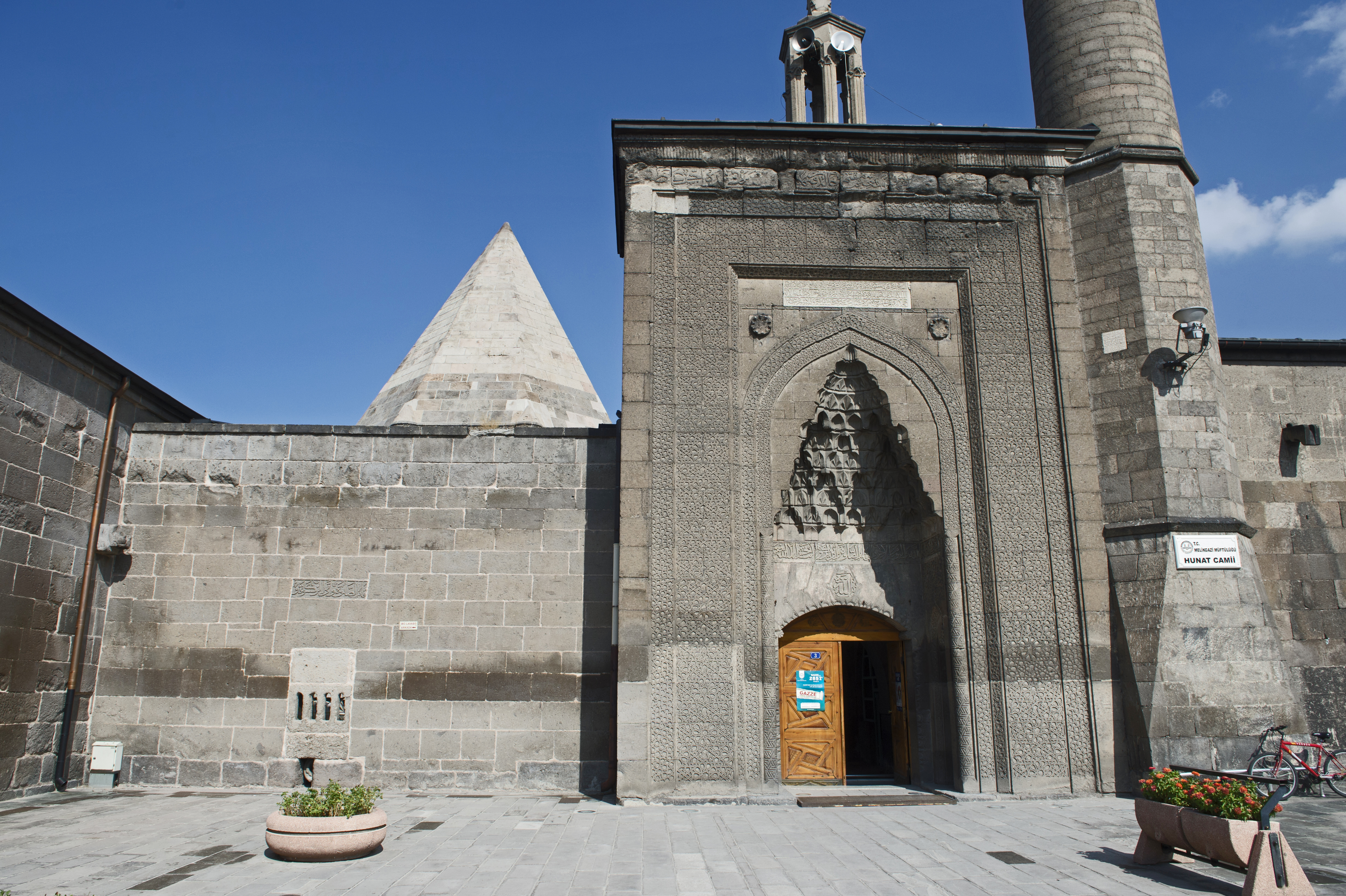
Exterior of the Hunat Hatun Mosque in Kayseri (1237–1238)

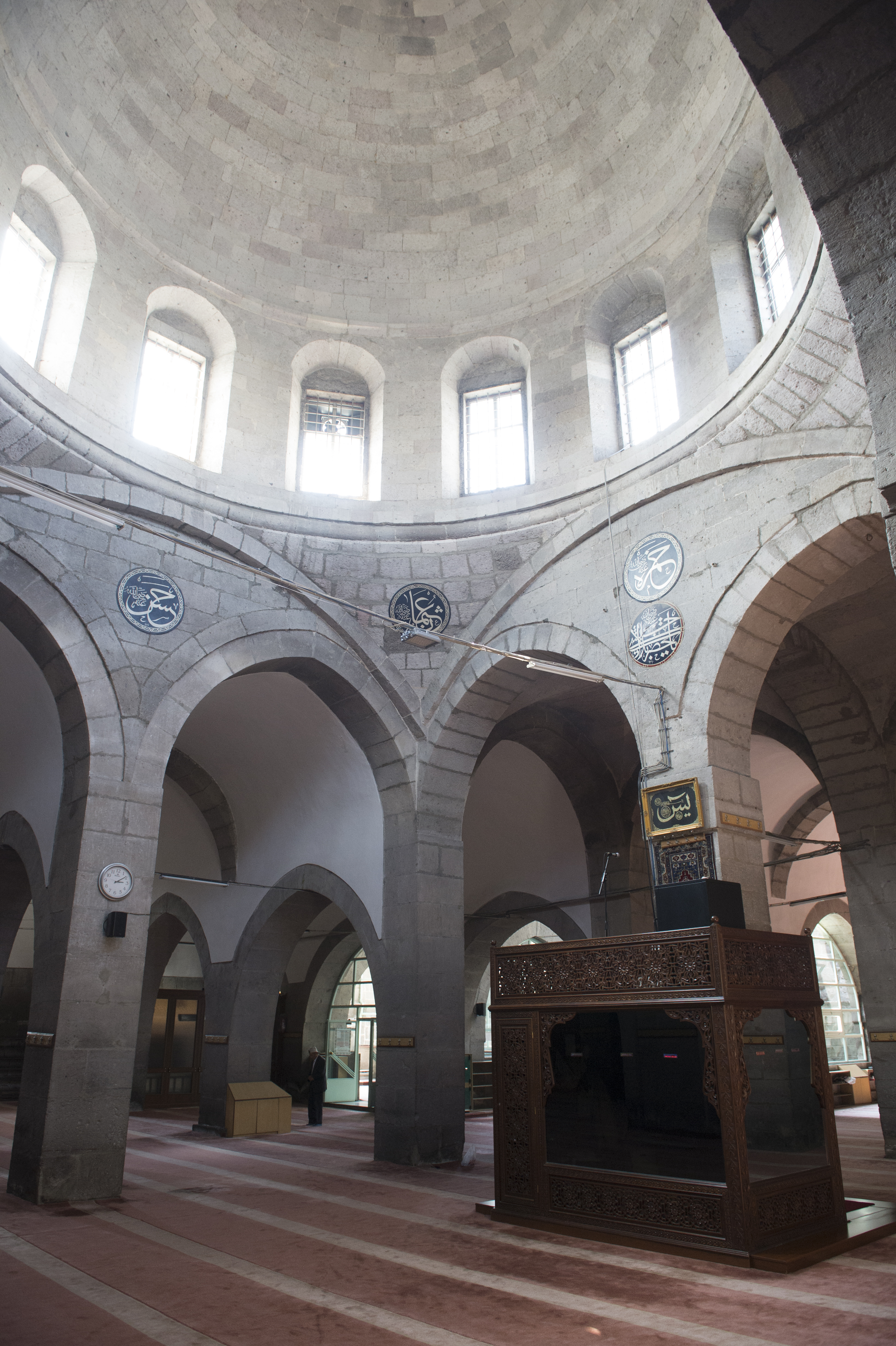
Domed area (originally a small open court) in the centre of the Hunat Hatun Mosque

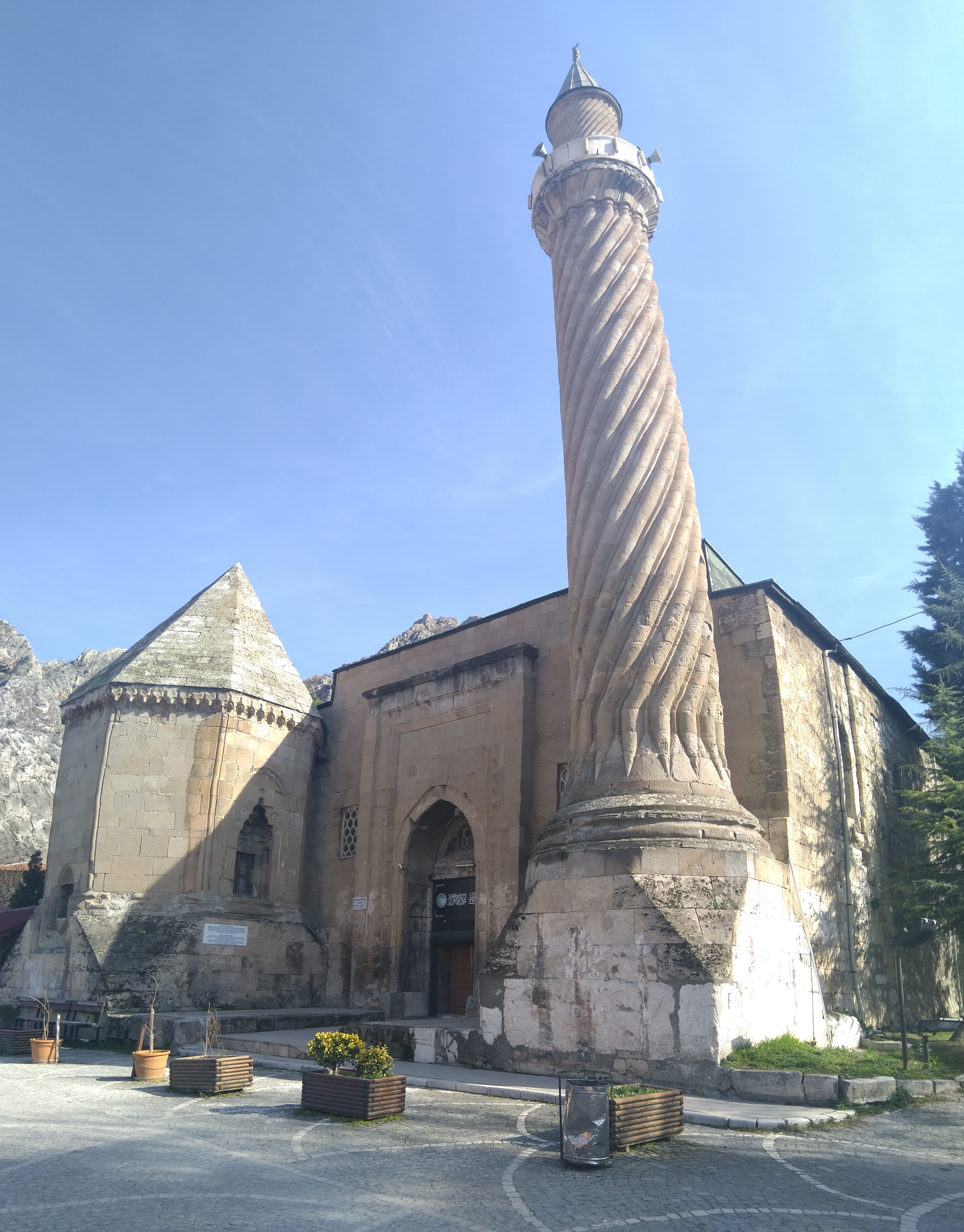
Burmali Minare Mosque in Amasya (13th century)

The "wooden" mosque, a variation of the hypostyle mosque with wooden columns and ceilings, emerged in western central Anatolia in the 13th century. The earliest example is the Great Mosque of Sivrihisar (1232), while other examples are the Great Mosque of Afyonkarahisar (1272) and the Arslanhane Mosque in Ankara (c. 1290). The most accomplished example is the Eşrefoğlu Mosque in Beyşehir, built in 1297 by the Eshrefids, a short-lived Beylik dynasty. The wooden columns in some of these mosques are ornately carved. These timber posts might have been influenced by the past of Central Asiatic Turks and their large tents held up by similarly carved wooden posts.

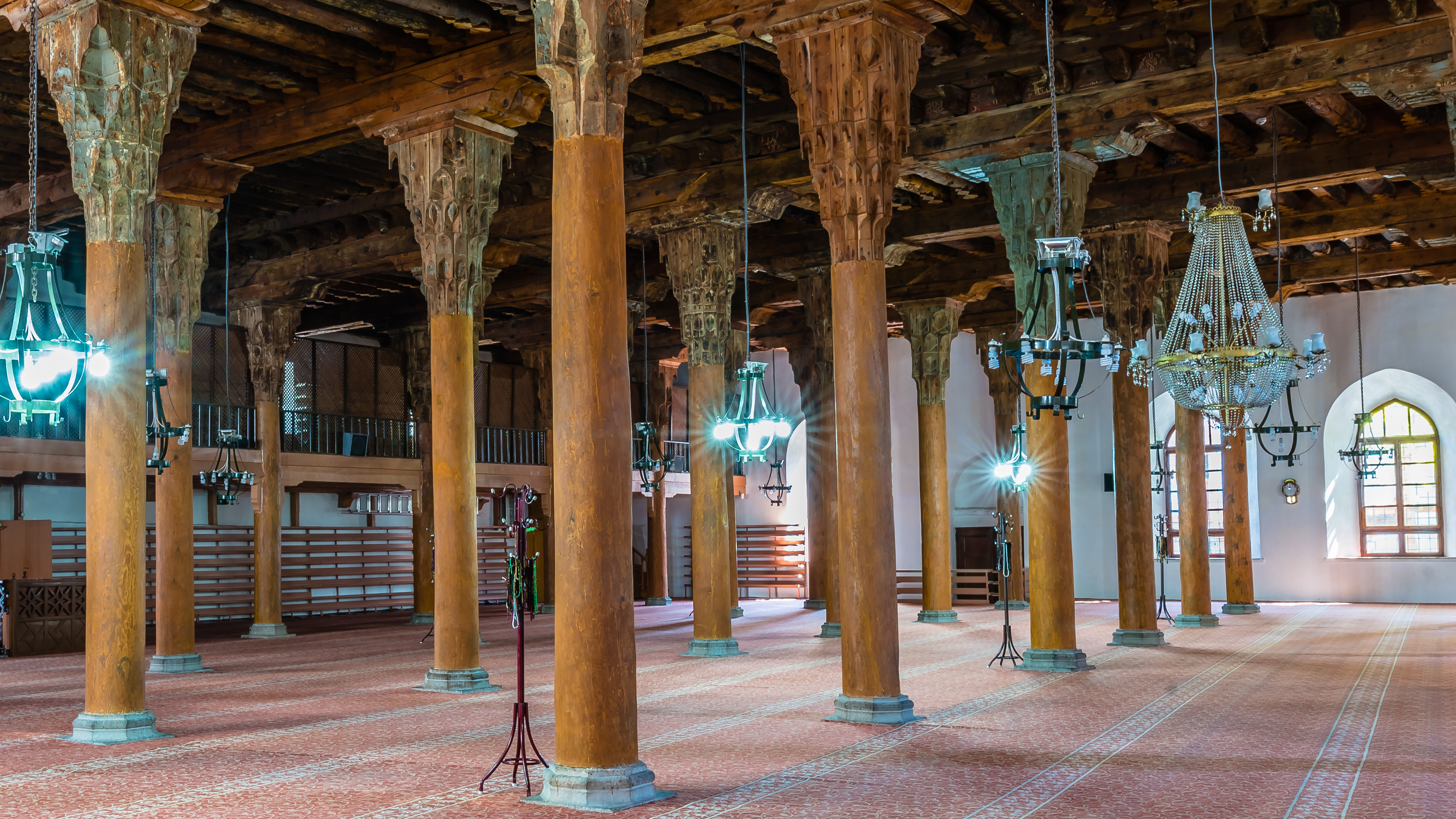
Great Mosque (Ulu Cami) of Afyonkarahisar (1272), an example of a wooden hypostyle mosque

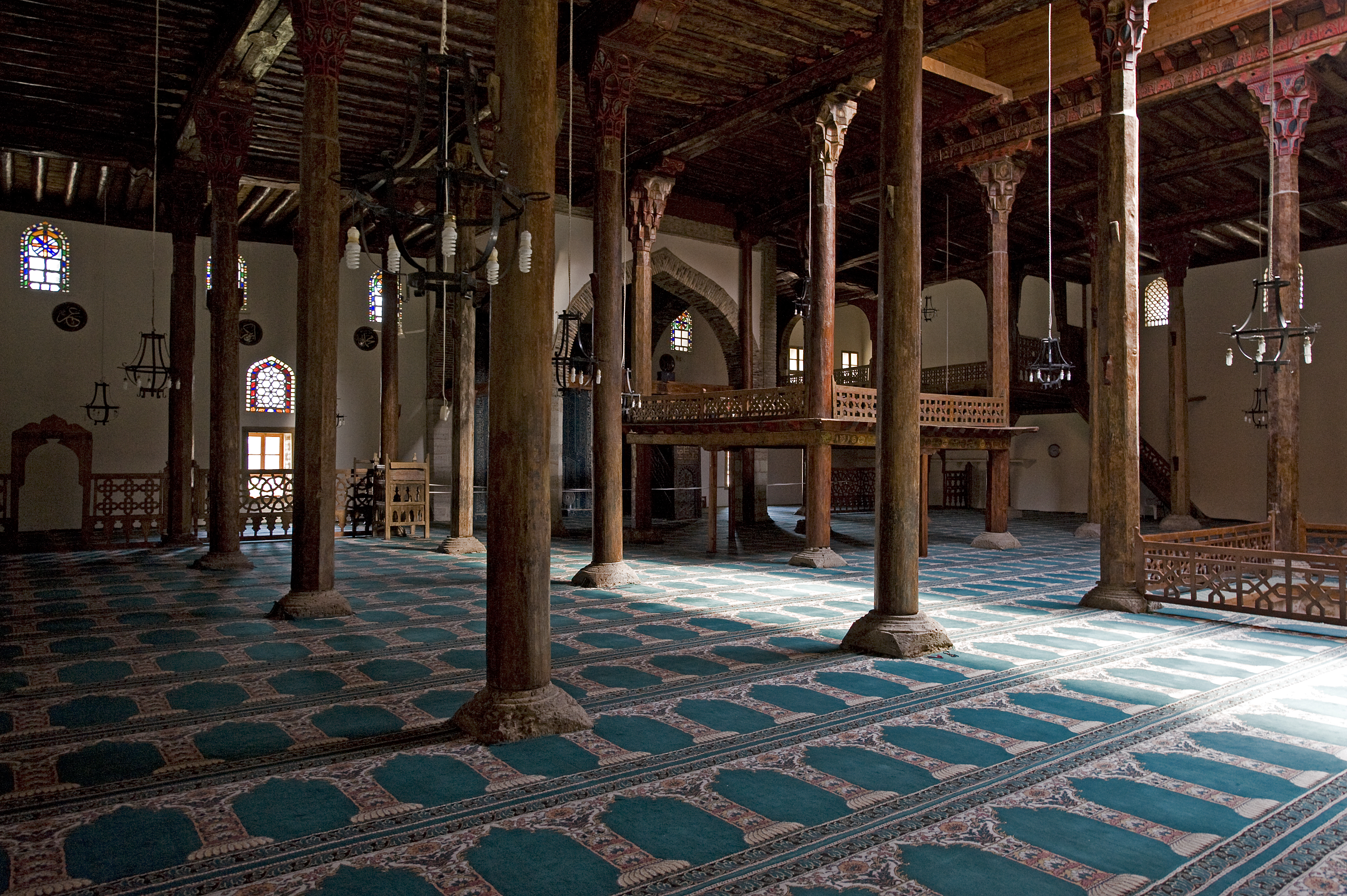
Eşrefoğlu Mosque in Beyşehir (1297), another wooden column mosque

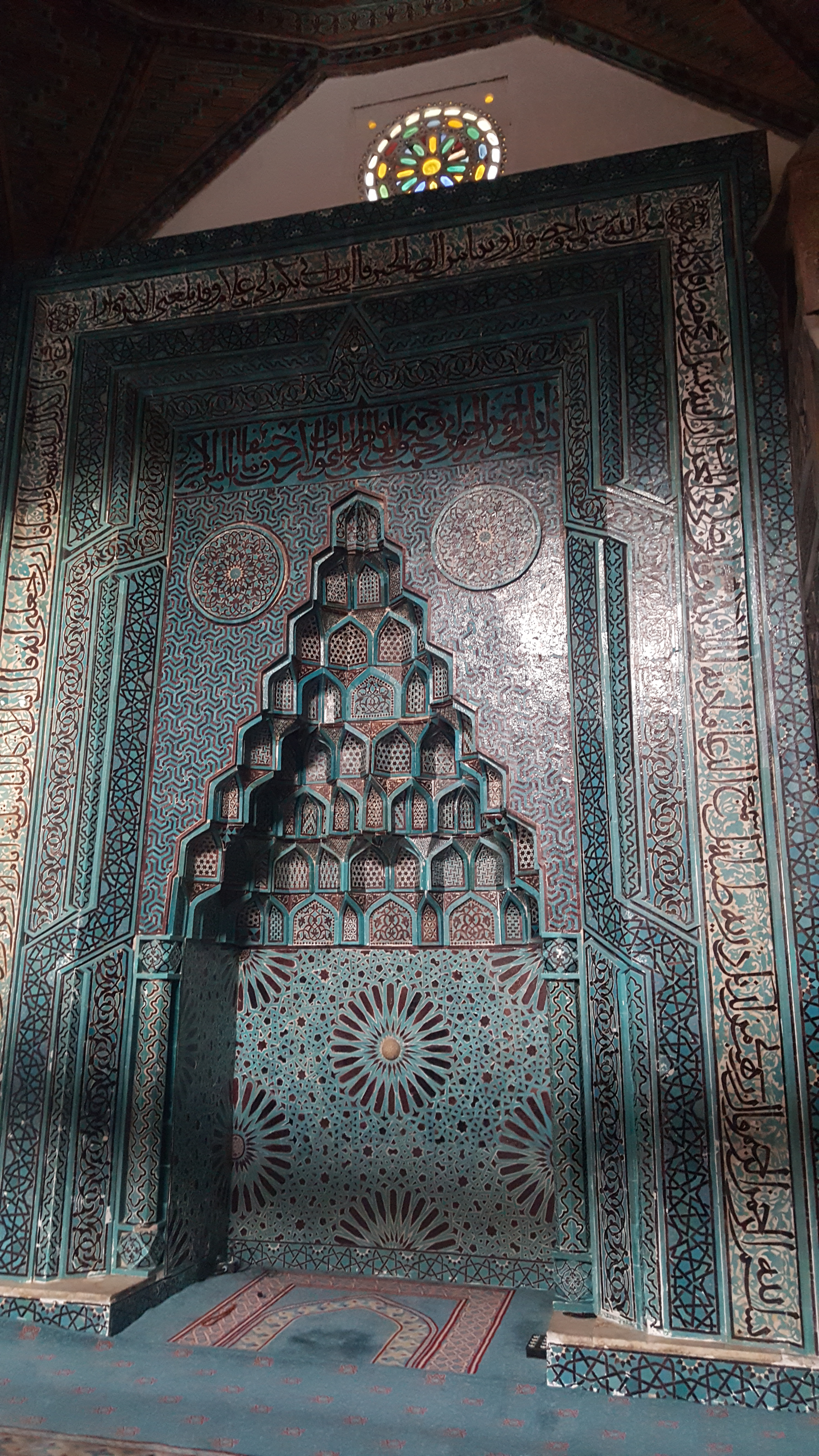
Tiled mihrab of the Eşrefoğlu Mosque

In southeastern Anatolia, under the control of Artuqid dynasties, the influence of existing Syrian architecture and mosques was more dominant. One of the most notable monuments here is the Great Mosque of Diyarbakir. It was originally founded in the 7th century but rebuilt in its current form under the Great Seljuks in the late 11th and 12th centuries, to which the Artuqids continued to add and expand in the late 12th and 13th centuries. It is similar in form to the Umayyad Mosque of Damascus and its ornate courtyard façades reuse Classical Roman elements alongside Islamic motifs. Another important Artuqid mosque in the region is the congregational mosque begun in 1204 in Kızıltepe (also known as Dunaysir or Koçhisar), which has a similar layout and is notable for the ornate stone-carving of its mihrab.

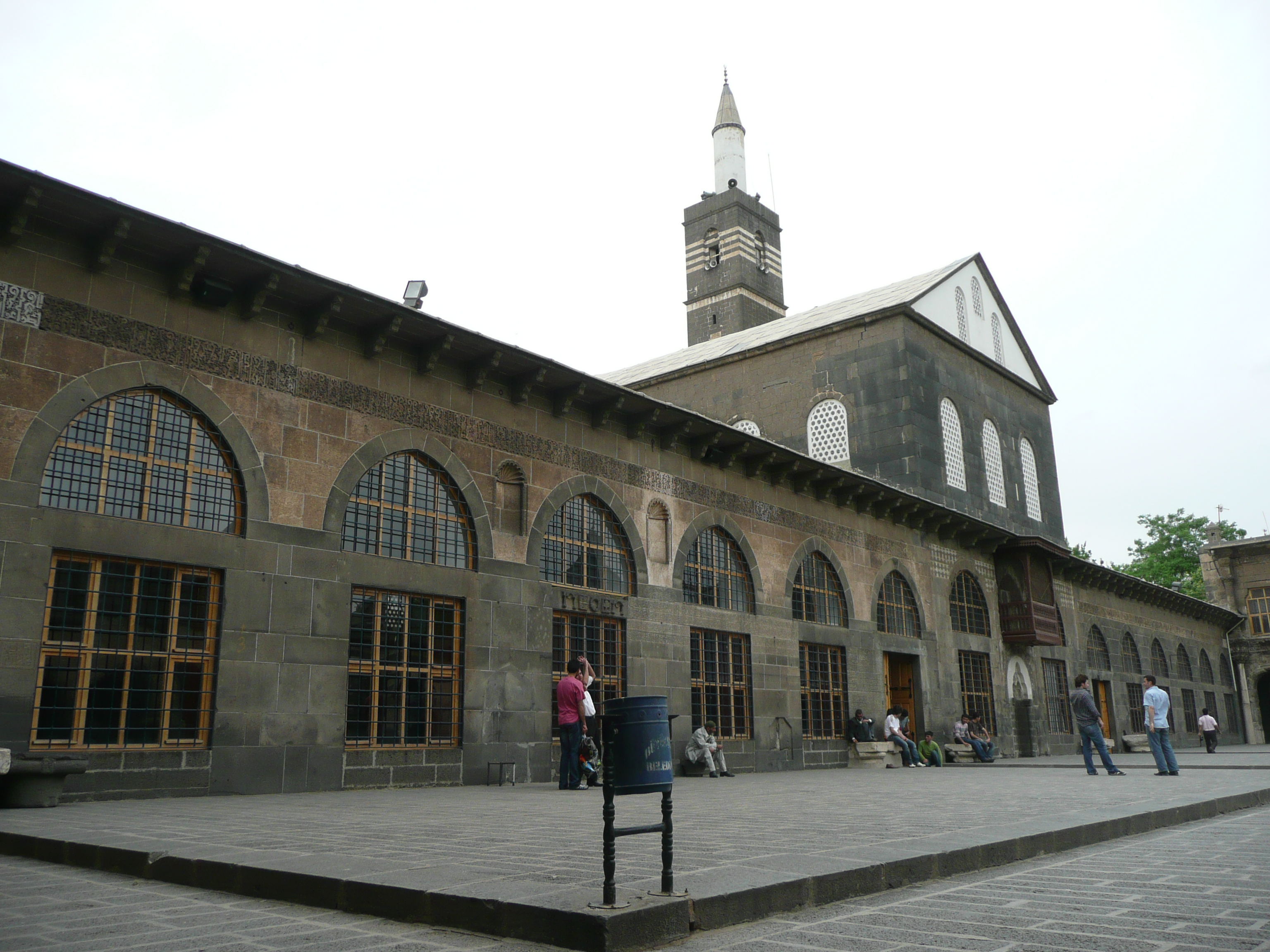
Great Mosque of Diyarbakir (founded in 7th century, reconstructed in 12th century)

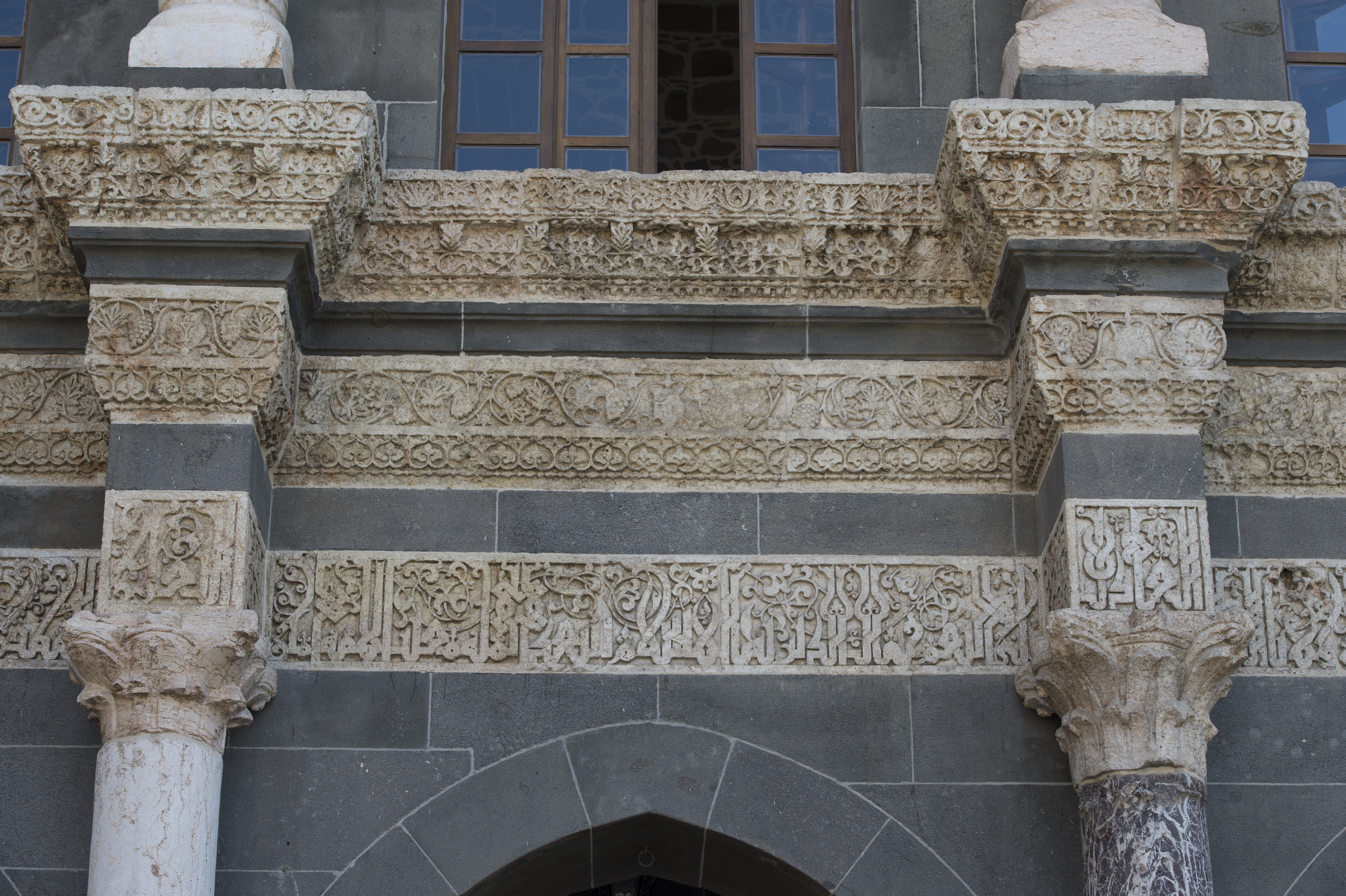
Details of the decorated eastern courtyard façade in the Great Mosque of Diyarbakir

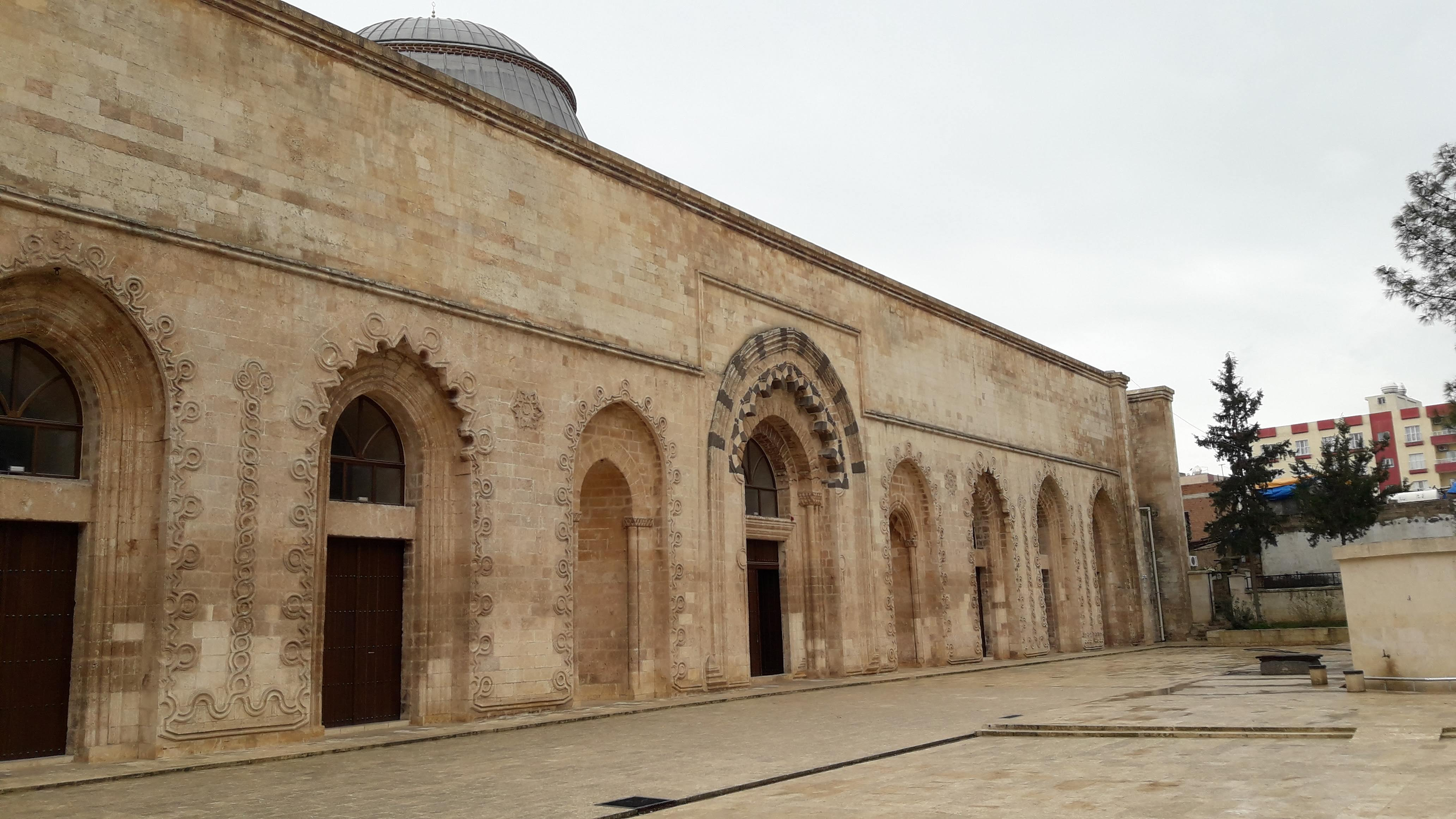
Façade of the Great Mosque (Ulu Cami) of Kızıltepe, begun by the Artuqids in 1204

Later on, under the Beyliks, mosque architecture was more diverse, with examples like the Saruhanid congregational mosque (Ulu Cami) in Manisa (1371), the Isa Bey Mosque in Selçuk (1374), and the İlyas Bey Mosque in Miletus (1404). As the years went on, there was increasing emphasis on the domed area in front of the mihrab, eventually culminating in the domed mosques of Ottoman architecture.

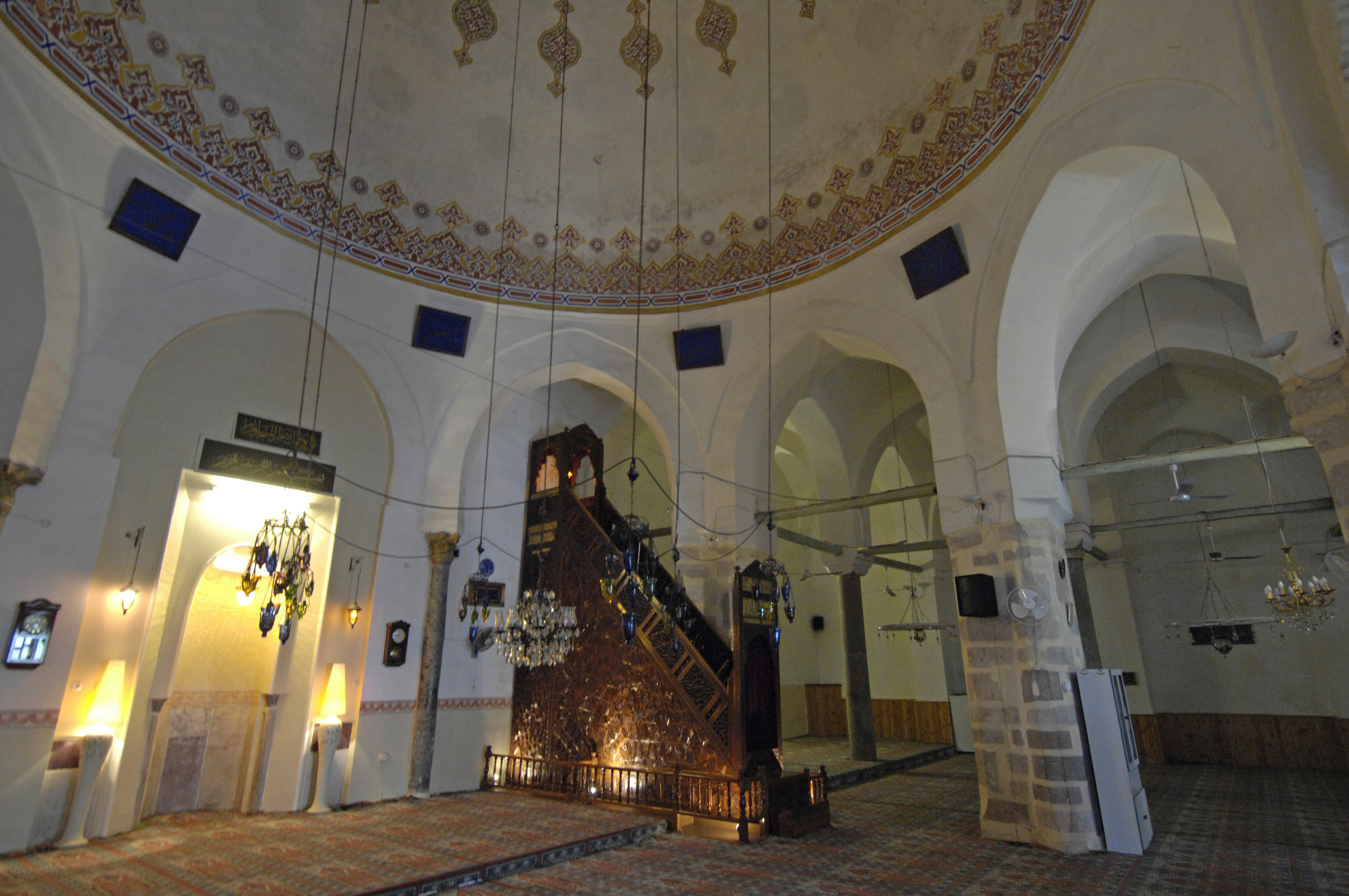
Interior of the Great Mosque (Ulu Cami) of Manisa, built by the Saruhanids around 1371

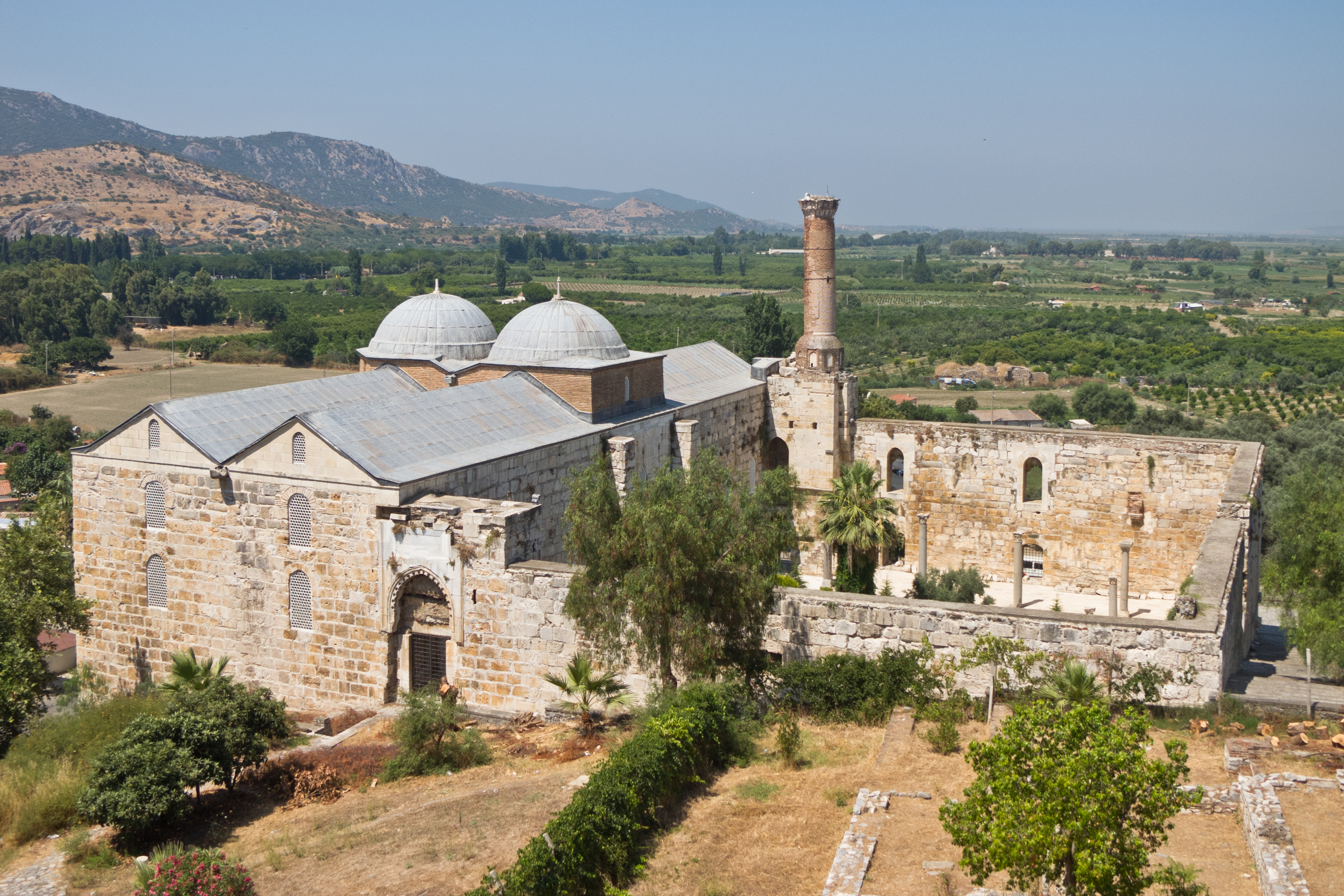
Isa Bey Mosque in Selçuk (1374)

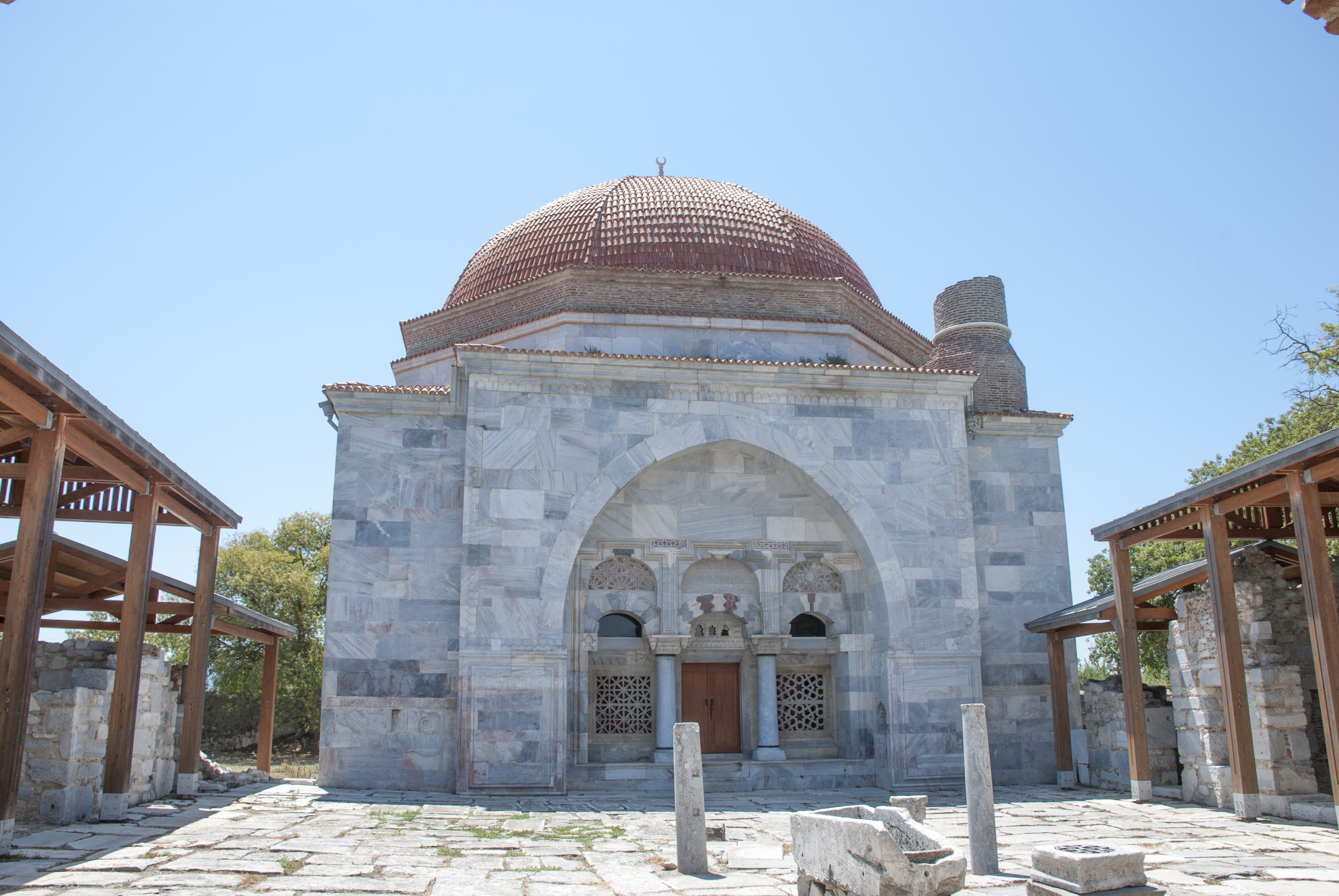
İlyas Bey Mosque in Miletus (1404)

== Madrasas and hospitals ==
Numerous madrasas were built. Architecturally, they consisted mainly of two types. One type, similar to those of Iran and Mesopotamia, was centered around an open courtyard which was bordered by a varying number of iwans (with at least one iwan situated along the axis of the entrance). In these madrasas the decoration was concentrated around a monumental entrance portal. The Çifte Minareli Medrese (c. 1250 or 1253) in Erzurum is one of the earliest examples of an entrance portal surmounted by twin minarets. The Gök Medrese (1271–1272) in Sivas is another rich monument in a similar form, which was erected the same year as two other open-court madrasas in the same city, the Çifte Minareli Medrese (only partly preserved) and the Buruciye Medrese. The Ak Medrese in Niğde (1404) is a very late example of this form built by the Karamanids, an emirate contemporary with the early Ottomans, although it is distinguished by a loggia of ogive arches along the second story of its façade.

The second type of madrasa, which was particular to Anatolia, was a smaller madrasa with a central court covered by a dome or vault. These were especially characteristic of Konya, exemplified by the Karatay Medrese and Ince Minareli Medrese. The Yakutiye Medrese in Erzurum is also a later example of this type, built in 1310 under the Ilkhanids. Its interior is roofed with multiple vaults and at the center of the hall is a square muqarnas vault culminating in a small lantern.

Hospitals (also known as a darüşşifa) were also built in many cities and usually followed the layout of madrasas. The Çifte or "Double" Madrasa in Kayseri (c. 1205) was co-founded by Kaykhusraw I and his sister Gevher Nesibe Hatun and consists of two open-air courtyard buildings, a medical school (madrasa) and a hospital, which are joined together. The Şifaiye Medrese built by Izz al-Din Kayka'us I in Sivas (1217–1218) was a hospital and consists of an open courtyard building with an integrated tomb for the founder. The Divriği Hospital, part of a larger mosque complex, resembles a madrasa with roofed courtyard.

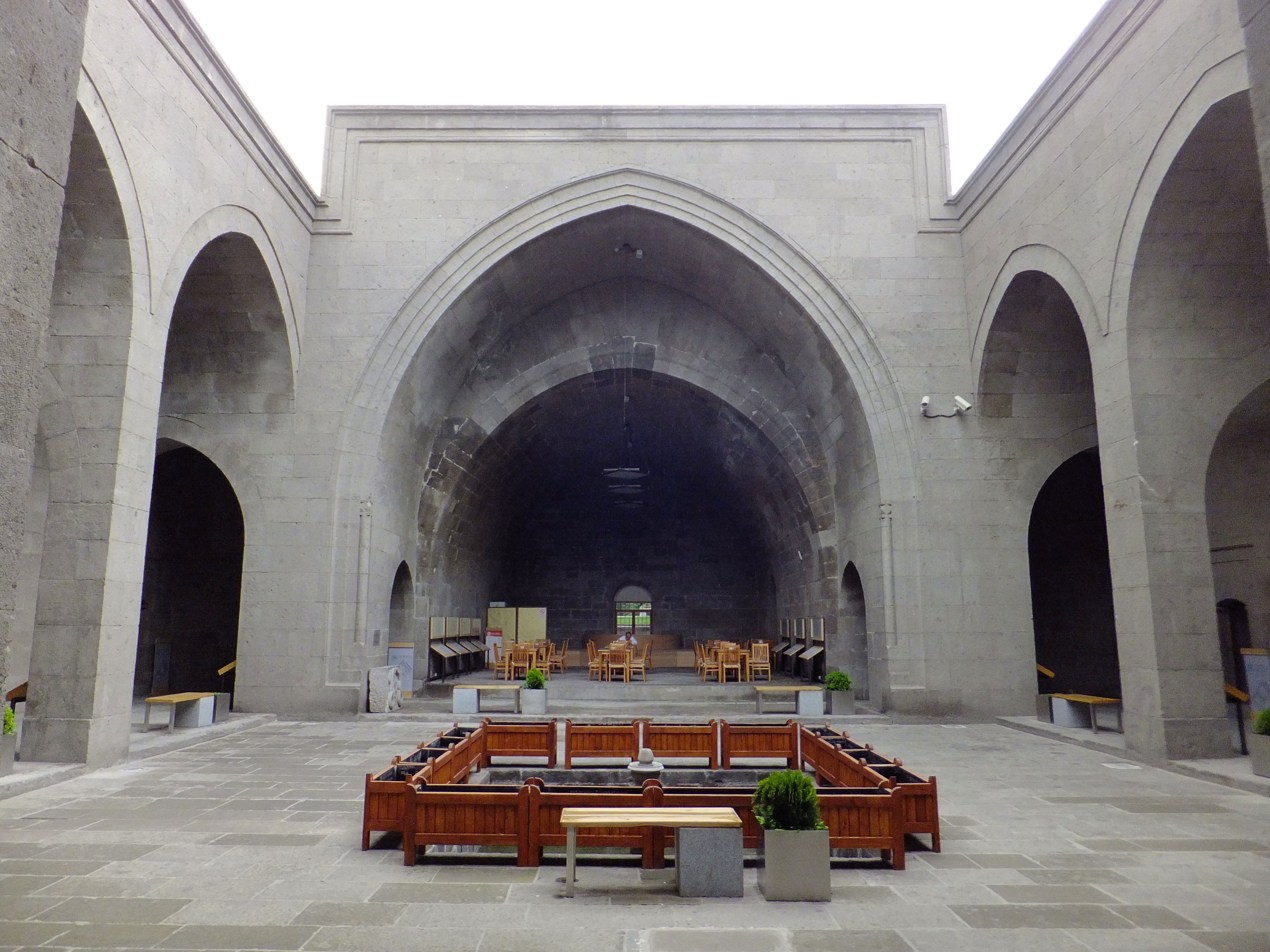
Gevher Nesibe Medrese (or Çifte Medrese) in Kayseri (c. 1205)

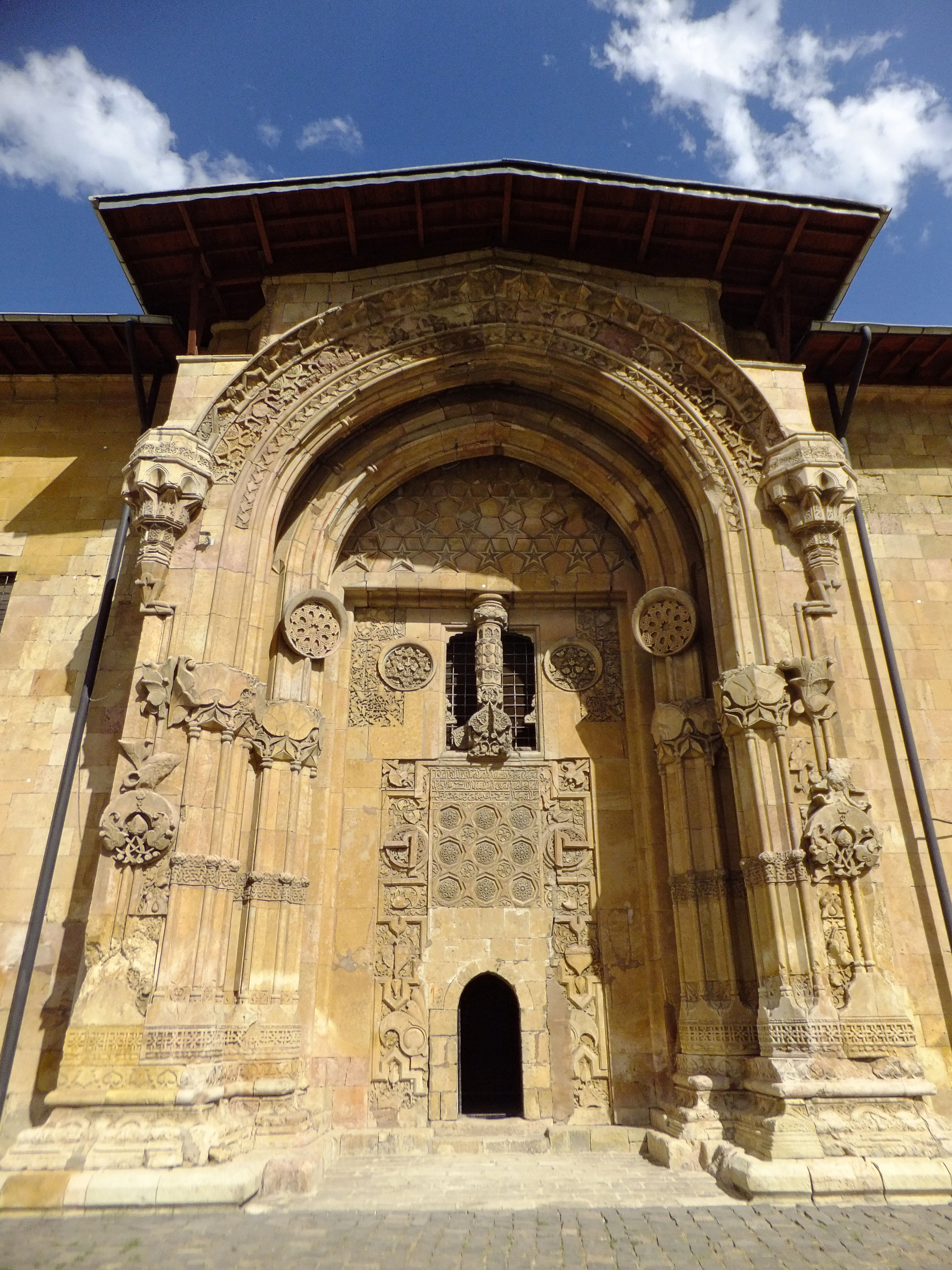
Portal of the Darüşşifa (hospital) in the Divriği mosque complex (1228–29)

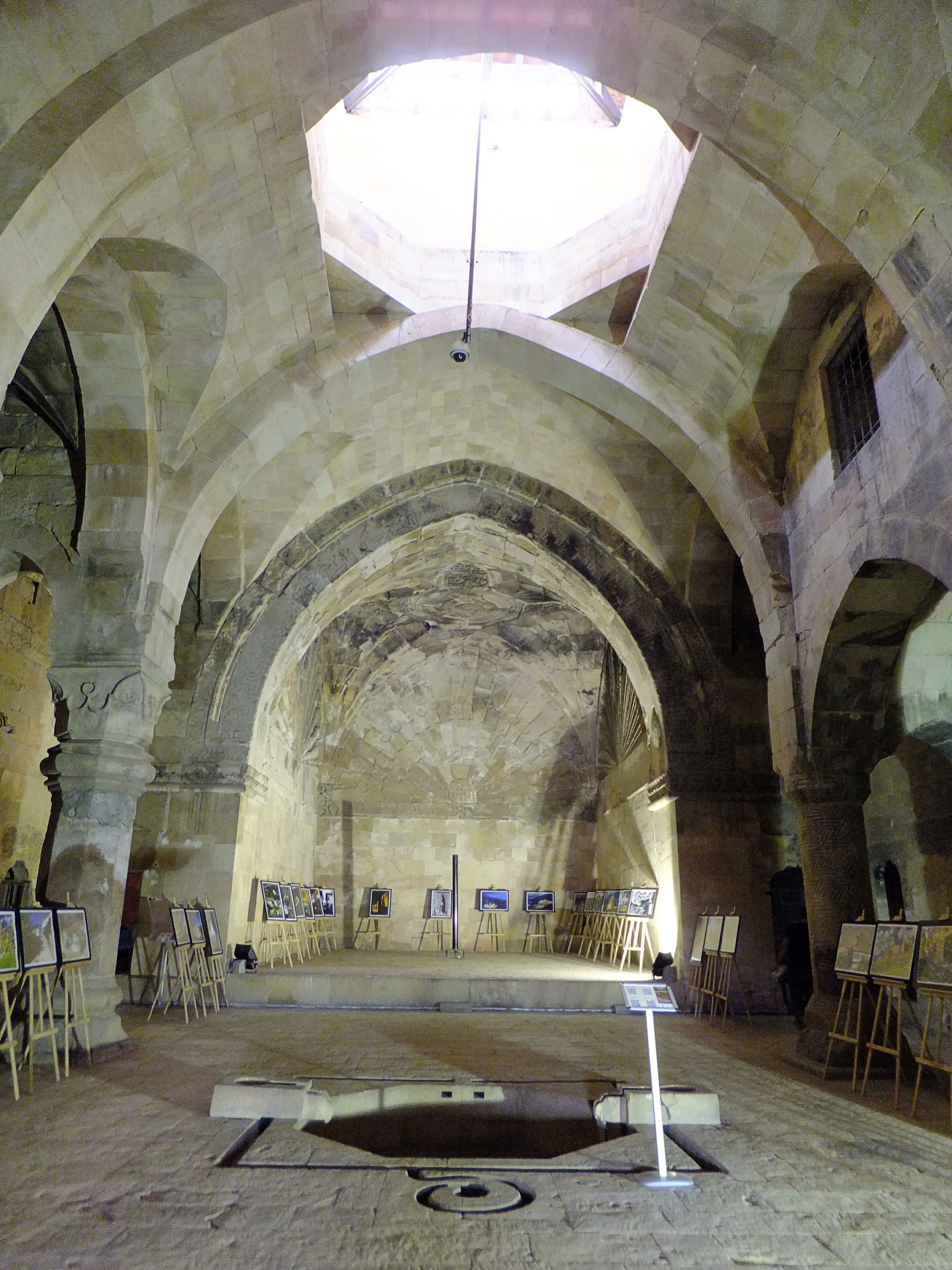
Interior of the hospital in the Divriği mosque complex

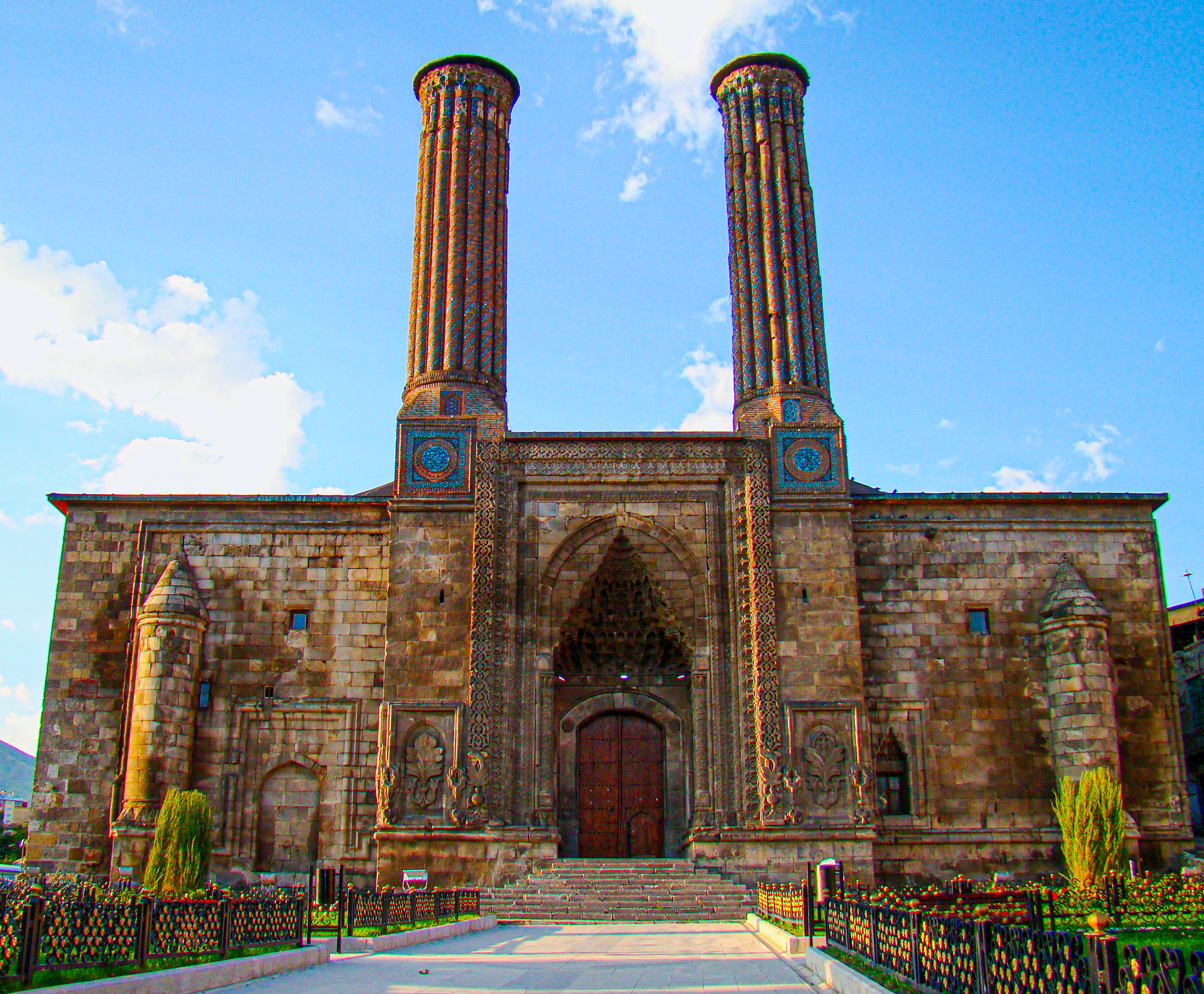
Çifte Minareli Medrese in Erzurum (c. 1250)

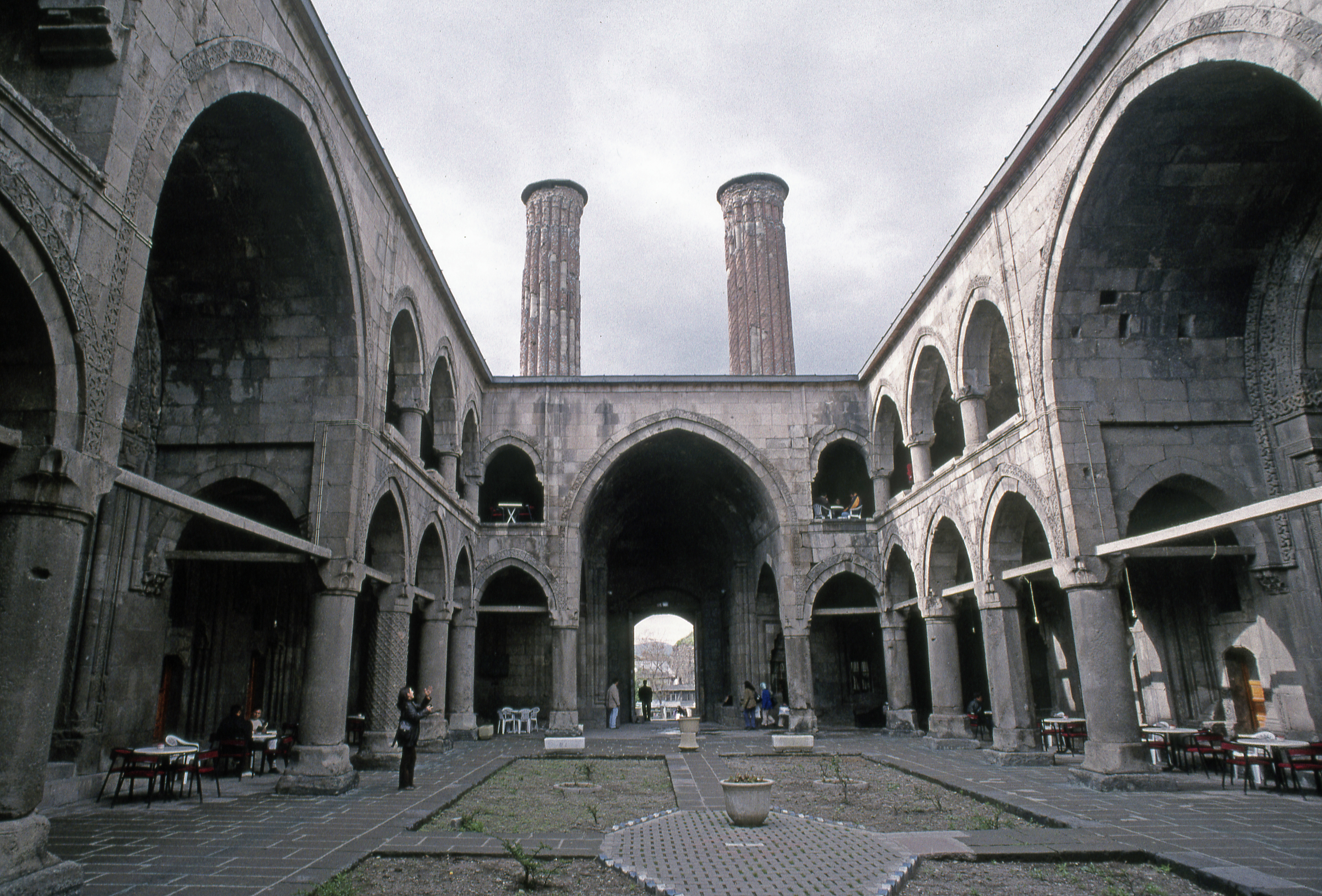
Interior of the Çifte Minareli Medrese

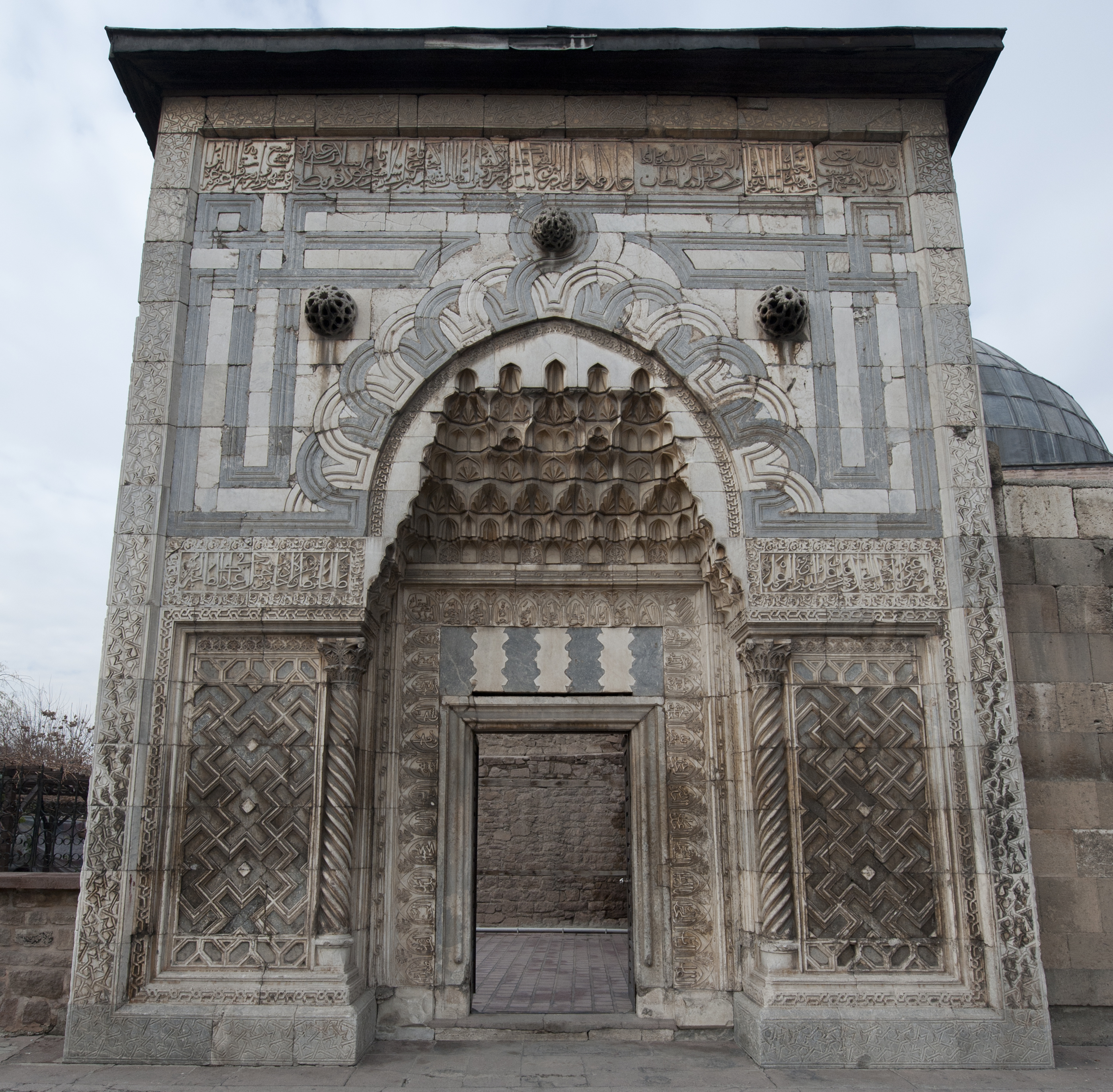
Entrance portal of the Karatay Madrasa in Konya (c. 1251), with muqarnas and ablaq decoration

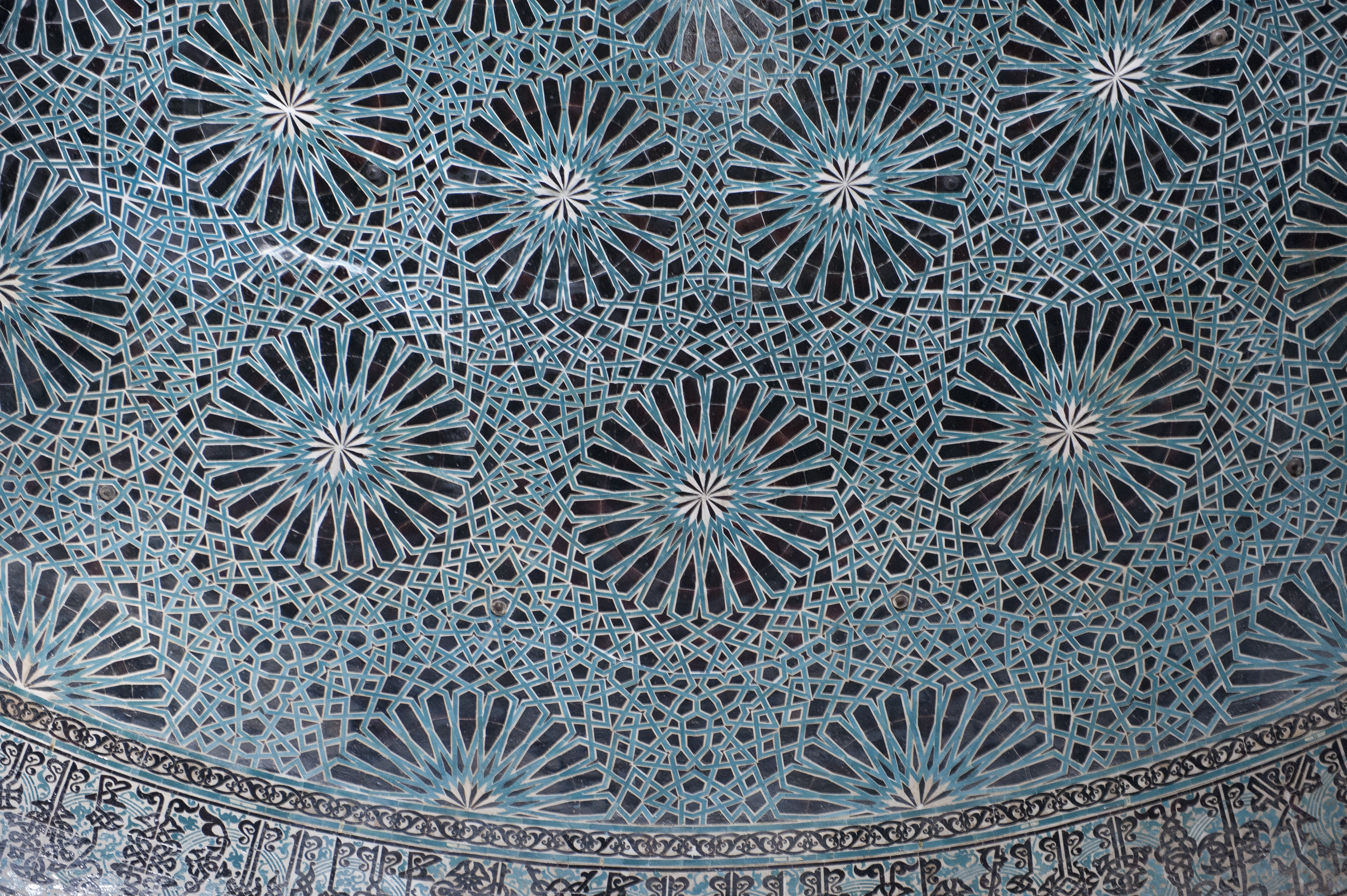
Tile decoration inside the Karatay Madrasa

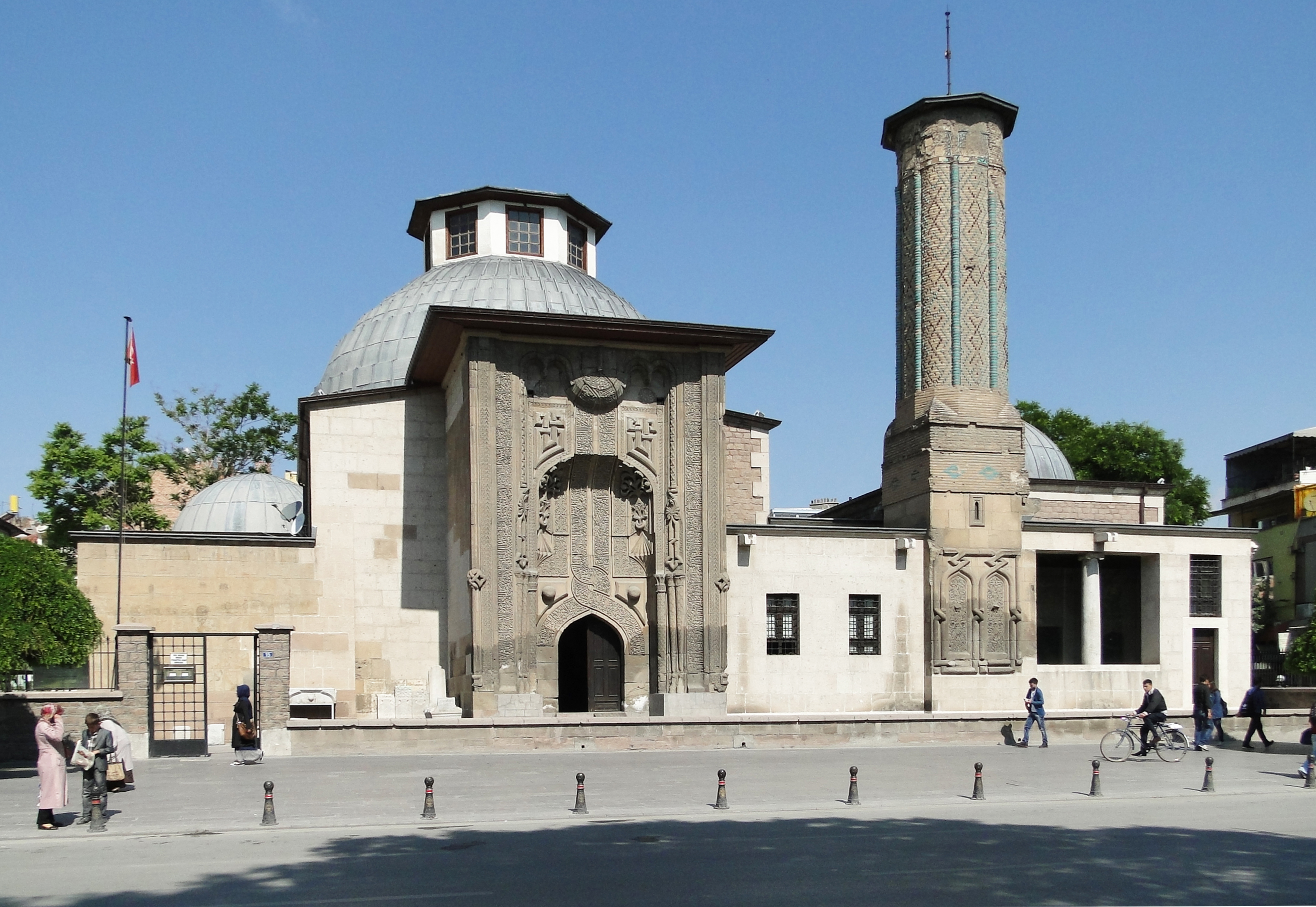
Ince Minareli Medrese in Konya (c. 1265)

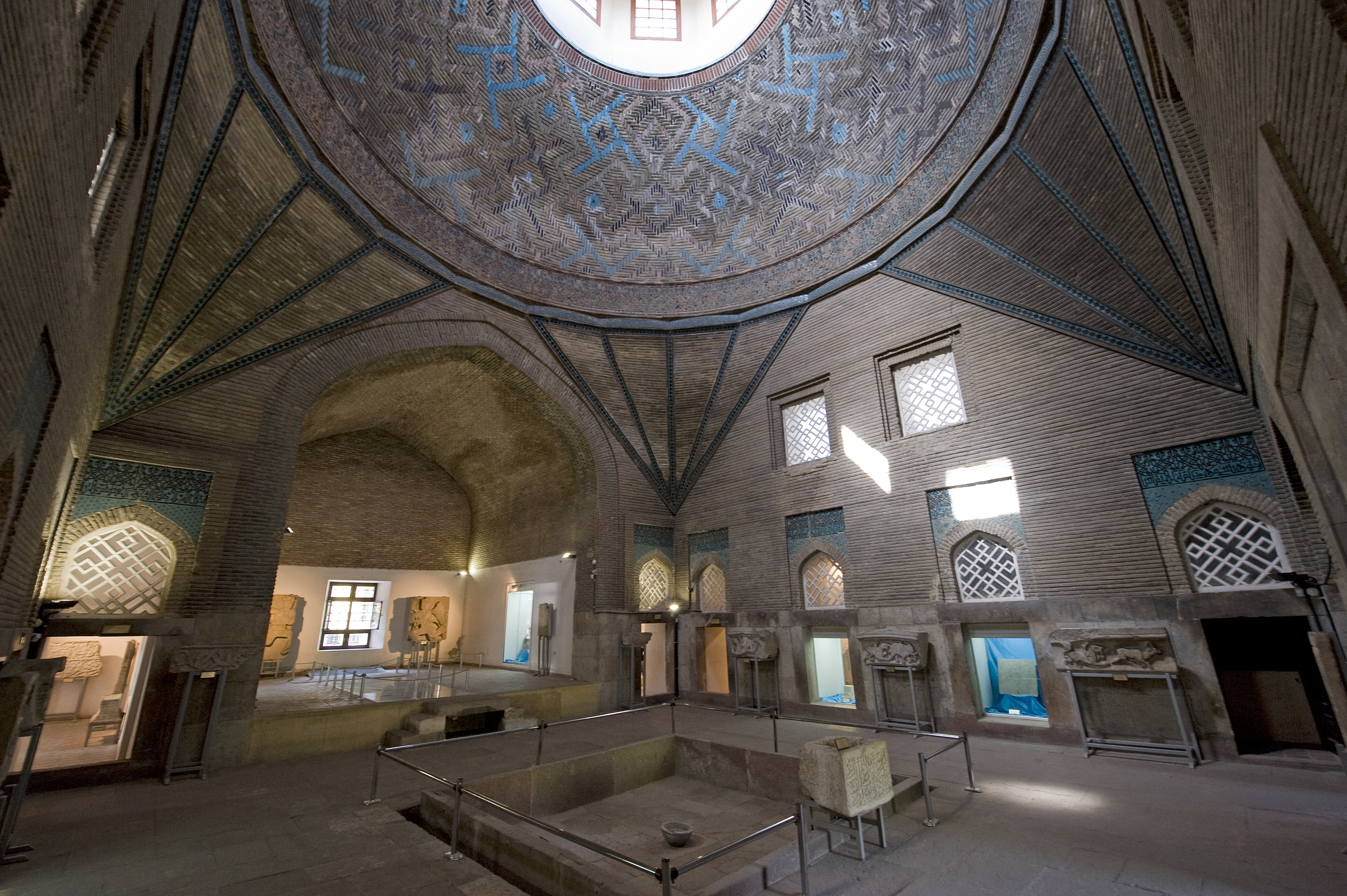
Interior of the Ince Minareli Medrese

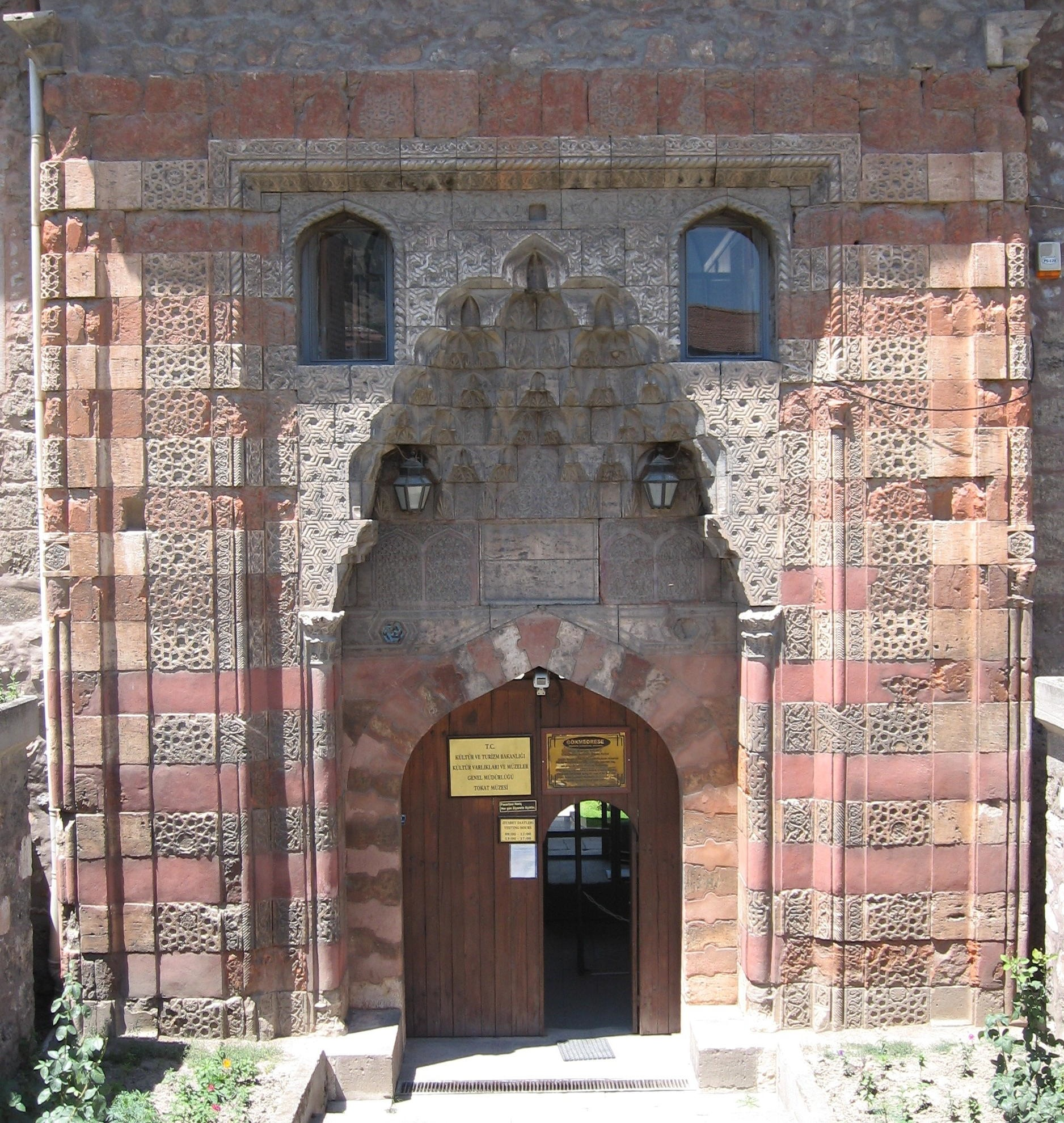
Façade of the Gök Medrese at Tokat, Turkey built ca. 1270

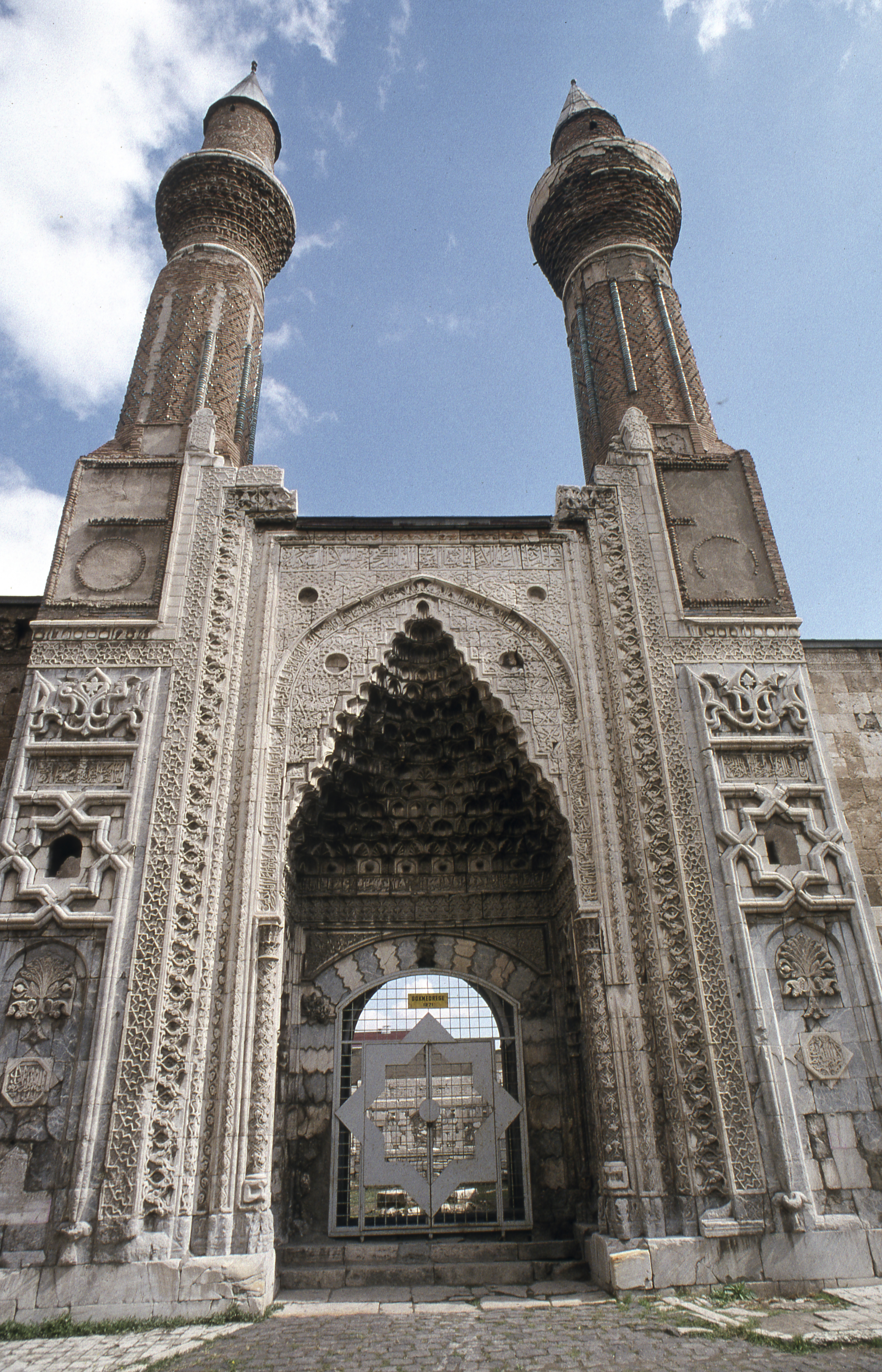
Entrance and minarets of the Gök Medrese in Sivas (1271–2)

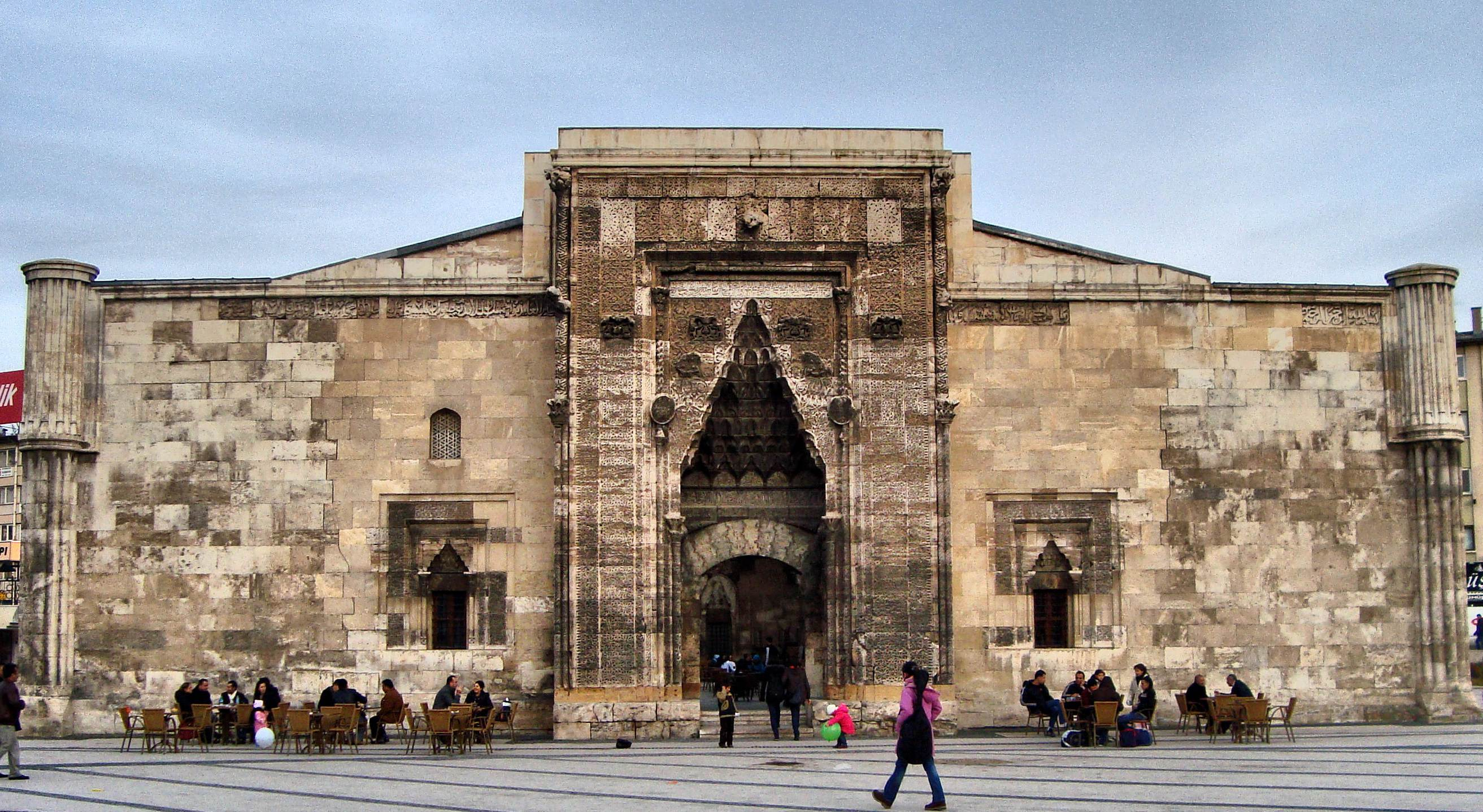
Buruciye Medrese in Sivas (1271–2)

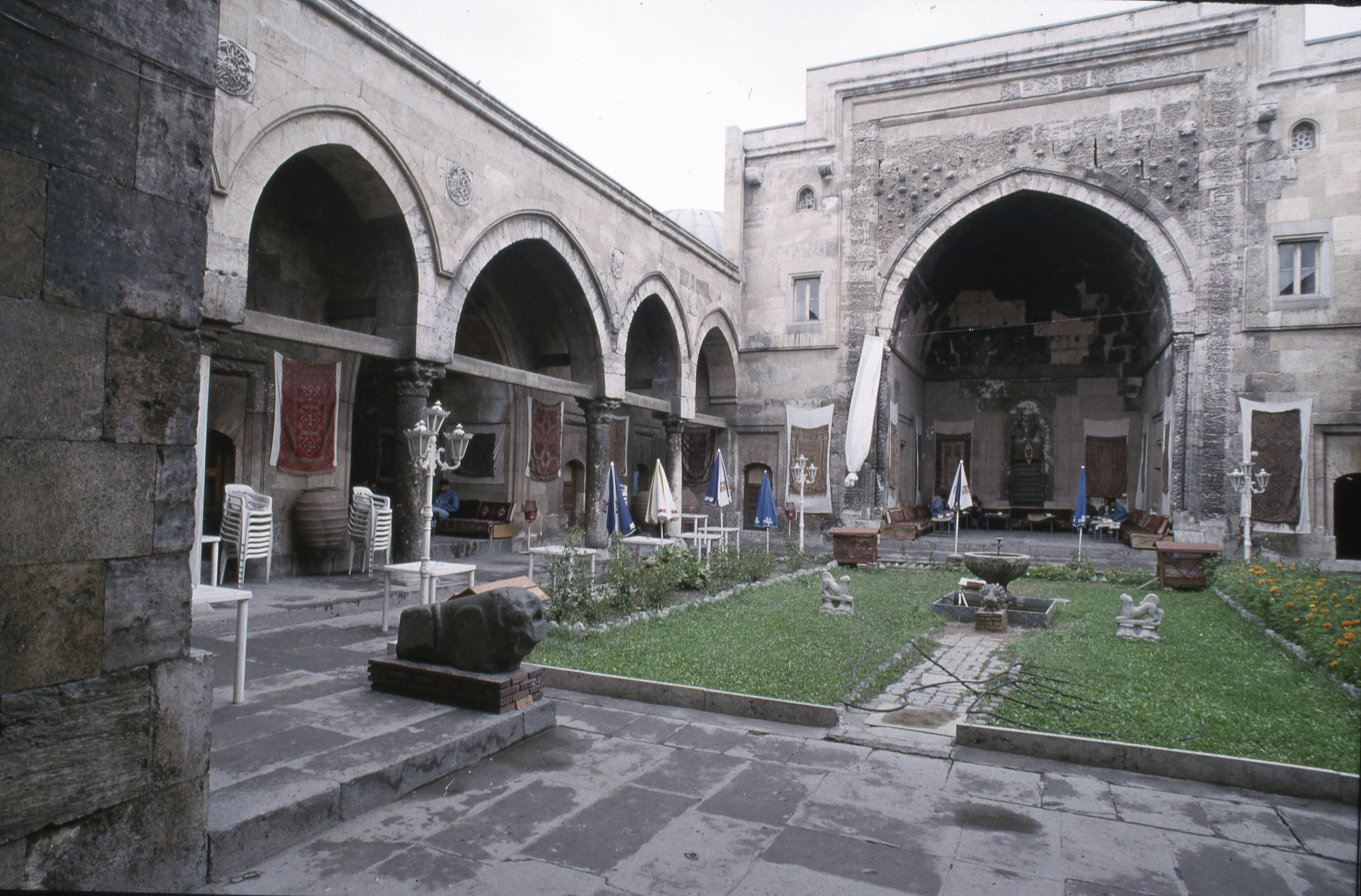
Courtyard of the Buruciye Medrese

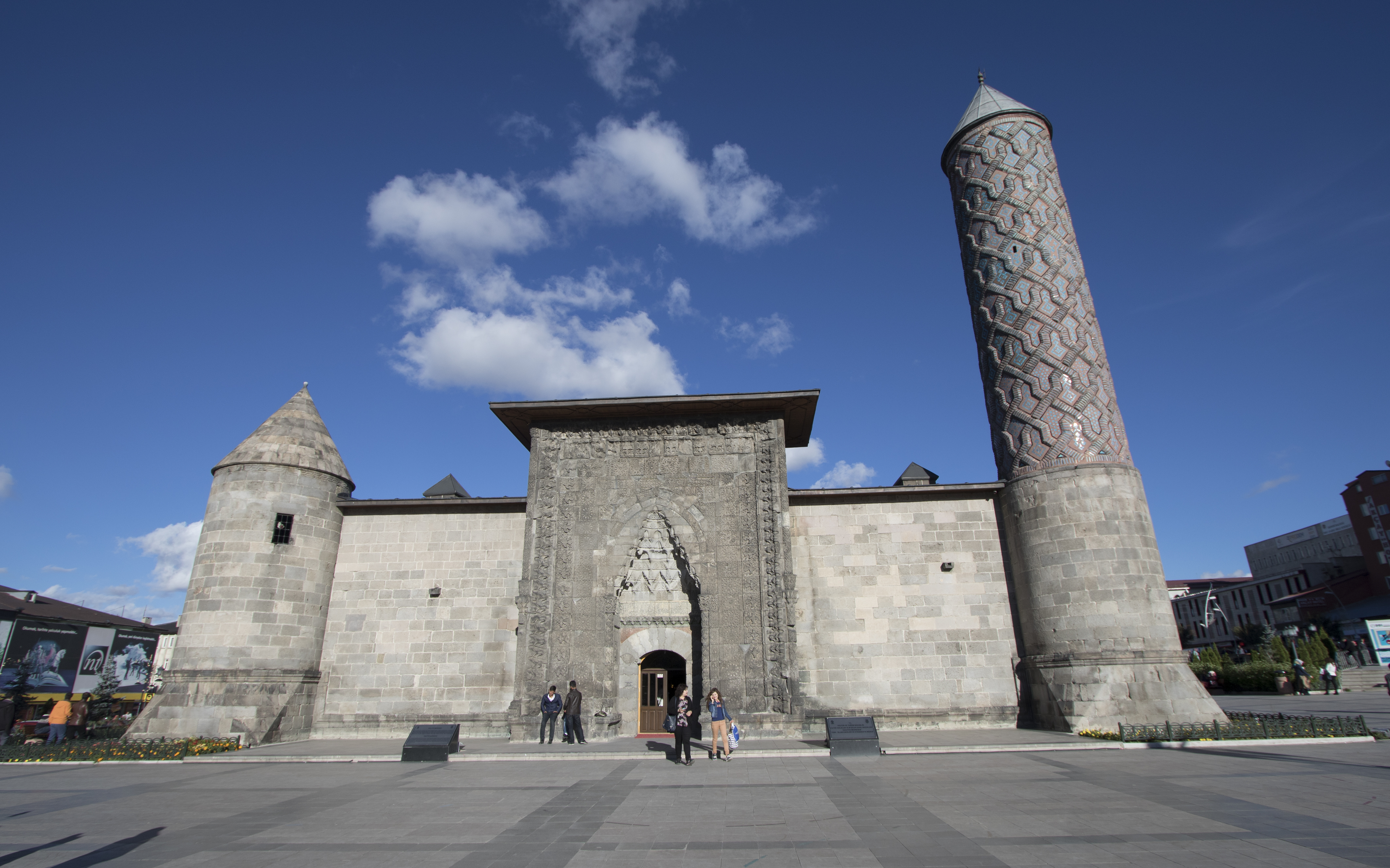
Yakutiye Medresesi in Erzurum (1310)

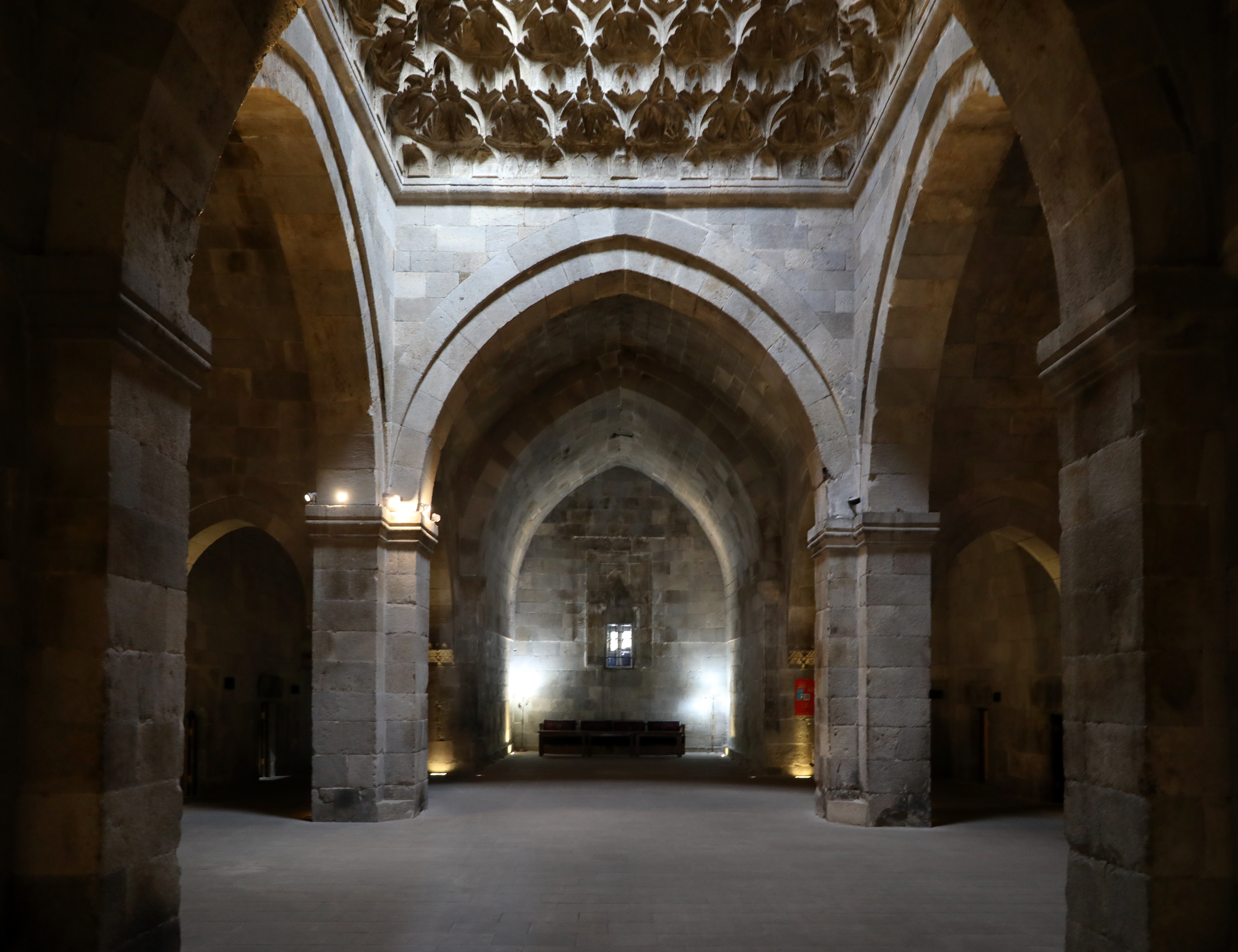
Interior of the Yakutiye Medrese, with central muqarnas vault

== Tombs ==
Tombs, which often accompanied madrasas or mosques, were most commonly of the polygonal (often octagonal) or circular type with a dome on the inside and a conical roof on the outside, although there were variations. This type of free-standing mausoleum, known in Turkish as a kümbet, had precedents in the tower-tombs built earlier in Iran. In Anatolia, they acquired a particular style that included rich stone-carved decoration.

The tomb of Sultan Kiliç Arslan II, located in the courtyard of the Alaeddin Mosque and built around 1190, is decagonal rather than octagonal. The Tomb of Emir Saltuq in Erzurum, built around the same time (late 12th century), has an octagonal lower and a cylindrical upper section. The Döner Kümbet, a dodecagonal tomb in Kayseri (c. 1275), and the later Hudavend Hatun Tomb in Niğde (1312) are richly decorated with stone-carved motifs including muqarnas and figurative images. The Mausoleum of Mama Hatun in Tercan (early 13th century) is an exceptional example in which the tomb structure is surrounded by a circular enclosing wall, which has its own decorated entrance portal. The Tomb of Sitte Melik (or of Shahin Shah) in Divriği, built before 1197, has one of the oldest muqarnas-decorated entrance portals in Anatolian Islamic architecture. The Tomb of Izz al-Din Kayka'us I, which is integrated into the Şifaiye Medrese he commissioned in Sivas, is notable for its façade of brick and tile decoration facing the building's courtyard and its octagonal pointed cupola that rises above the surrounding structure.

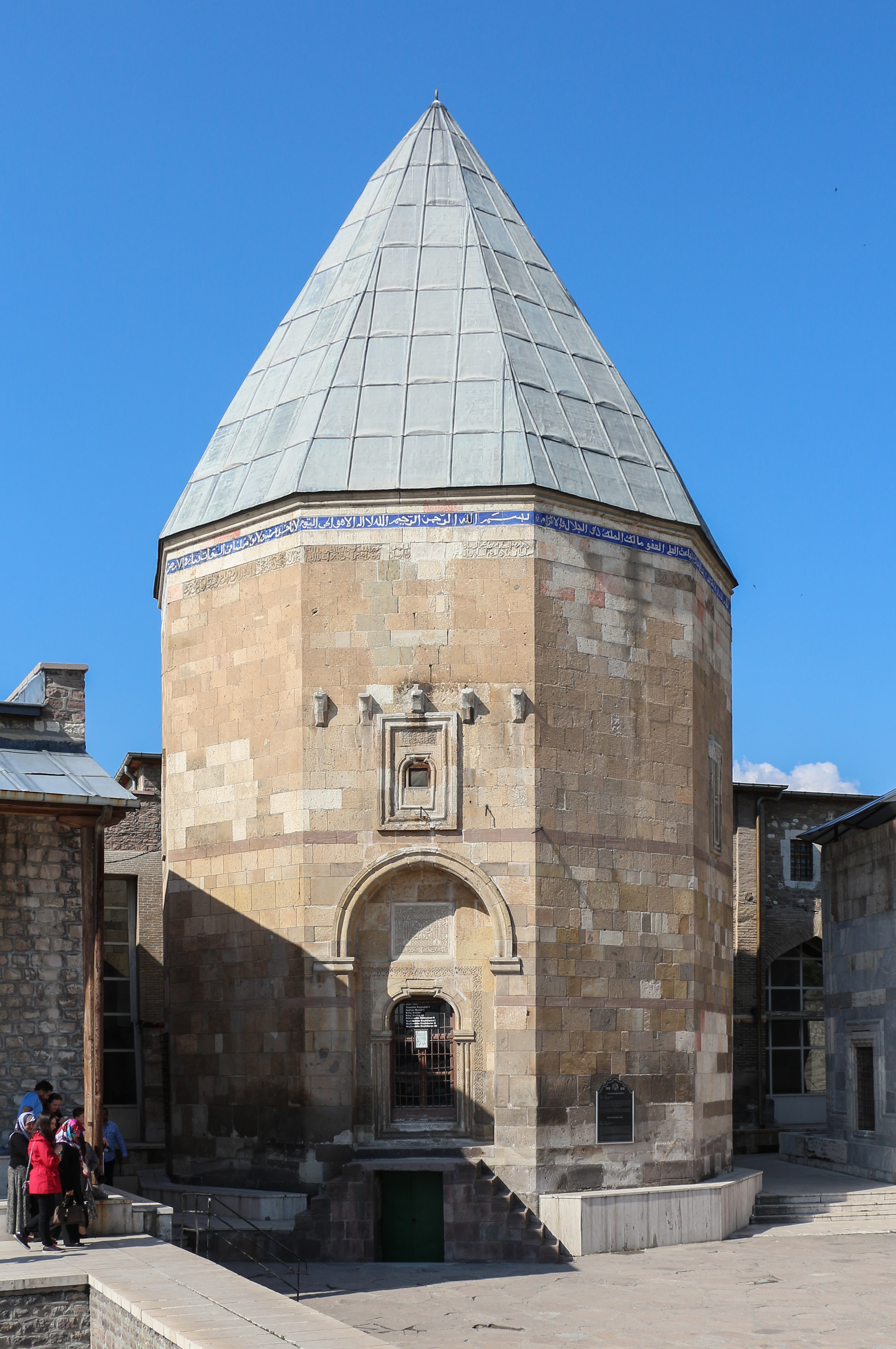
Tomb of Kiliç Arslan II in the Alaeddin Mosque of Konya (c. 1190)

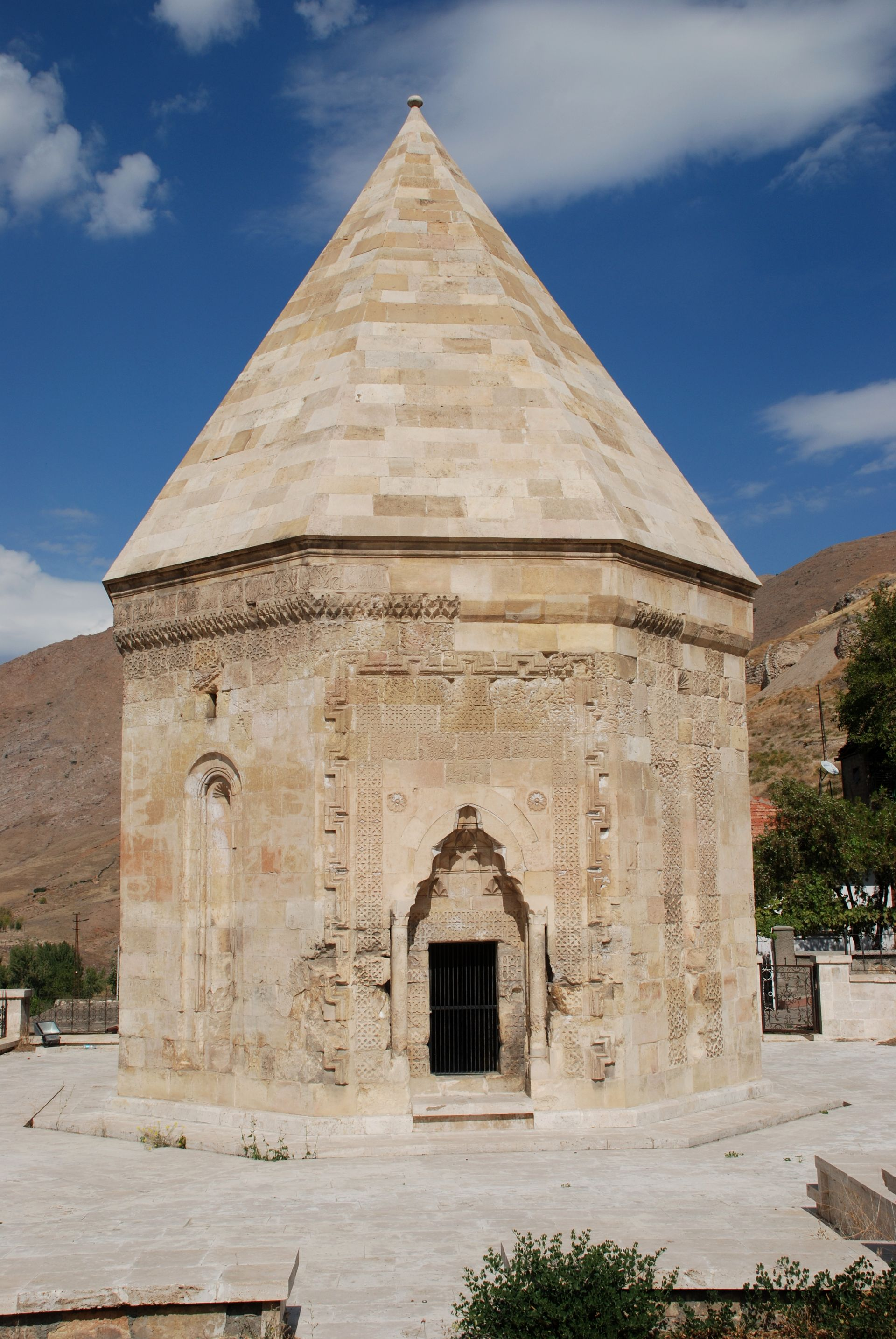
Tomb of Sitte Melik in Divriği (before 1197)

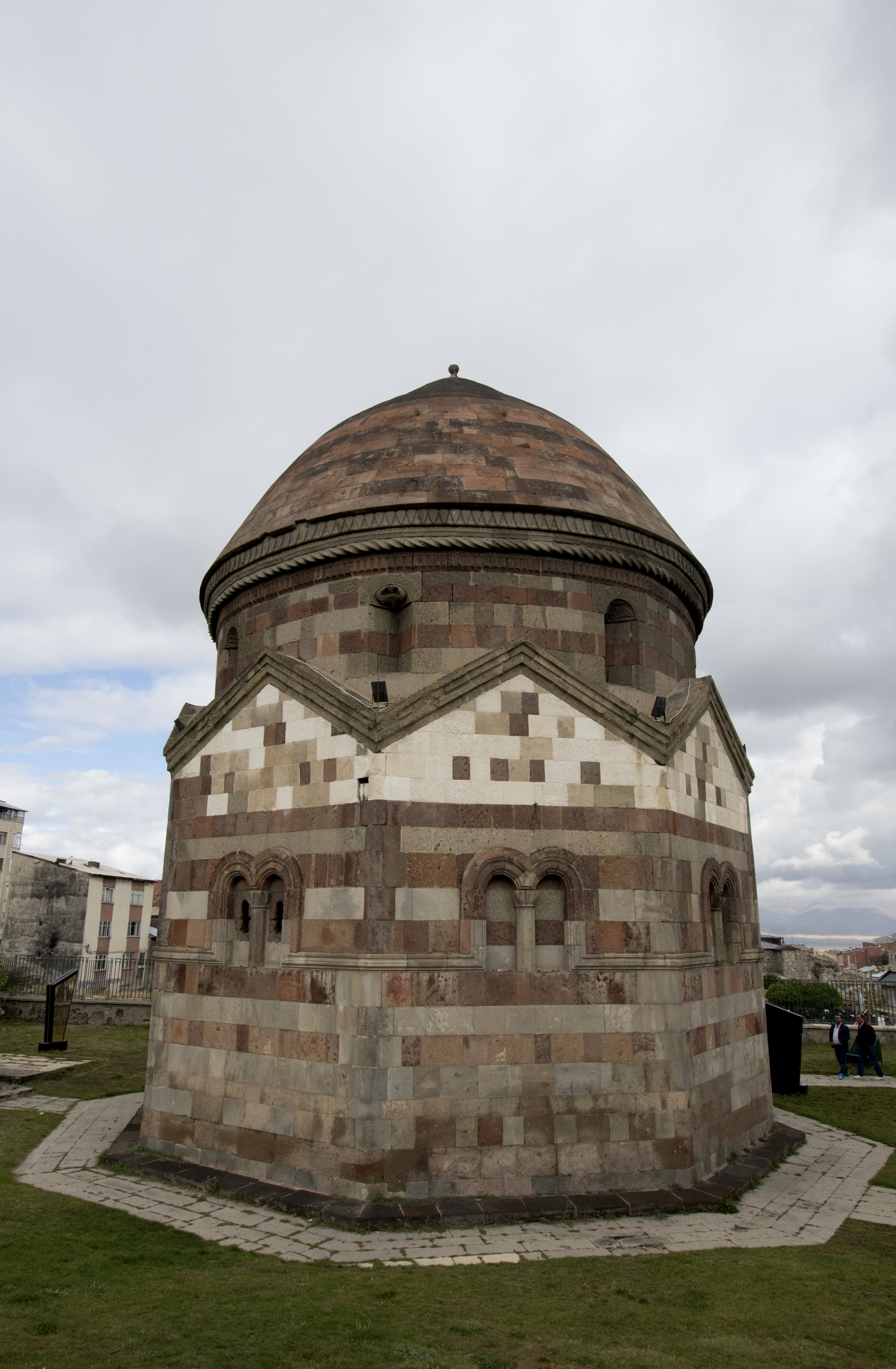
Tomb of Emir Saltuq in Erzurum (late 12th century)

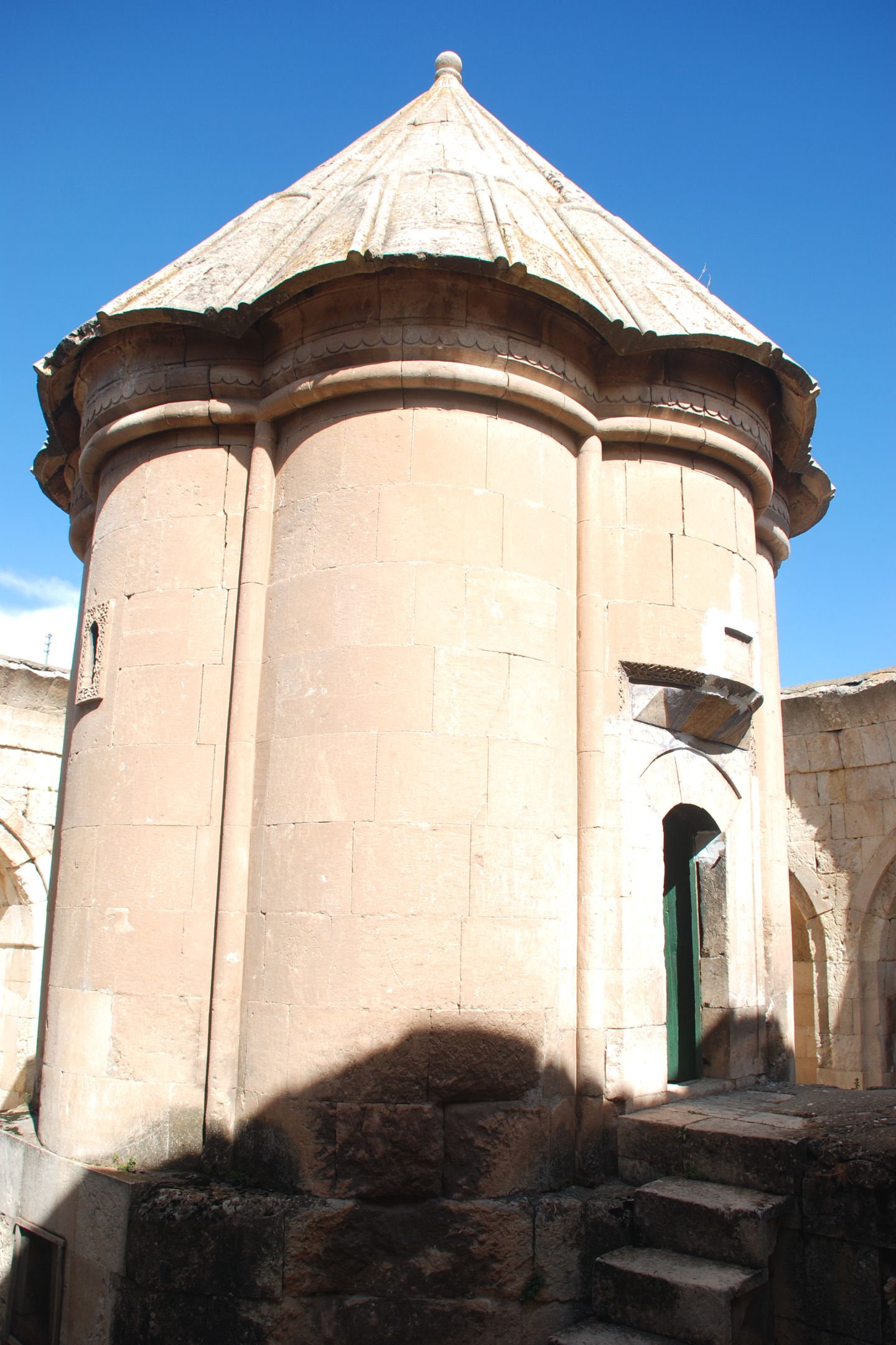
Tomb of Melike Mama Hatun in Tercan (early 13th century)

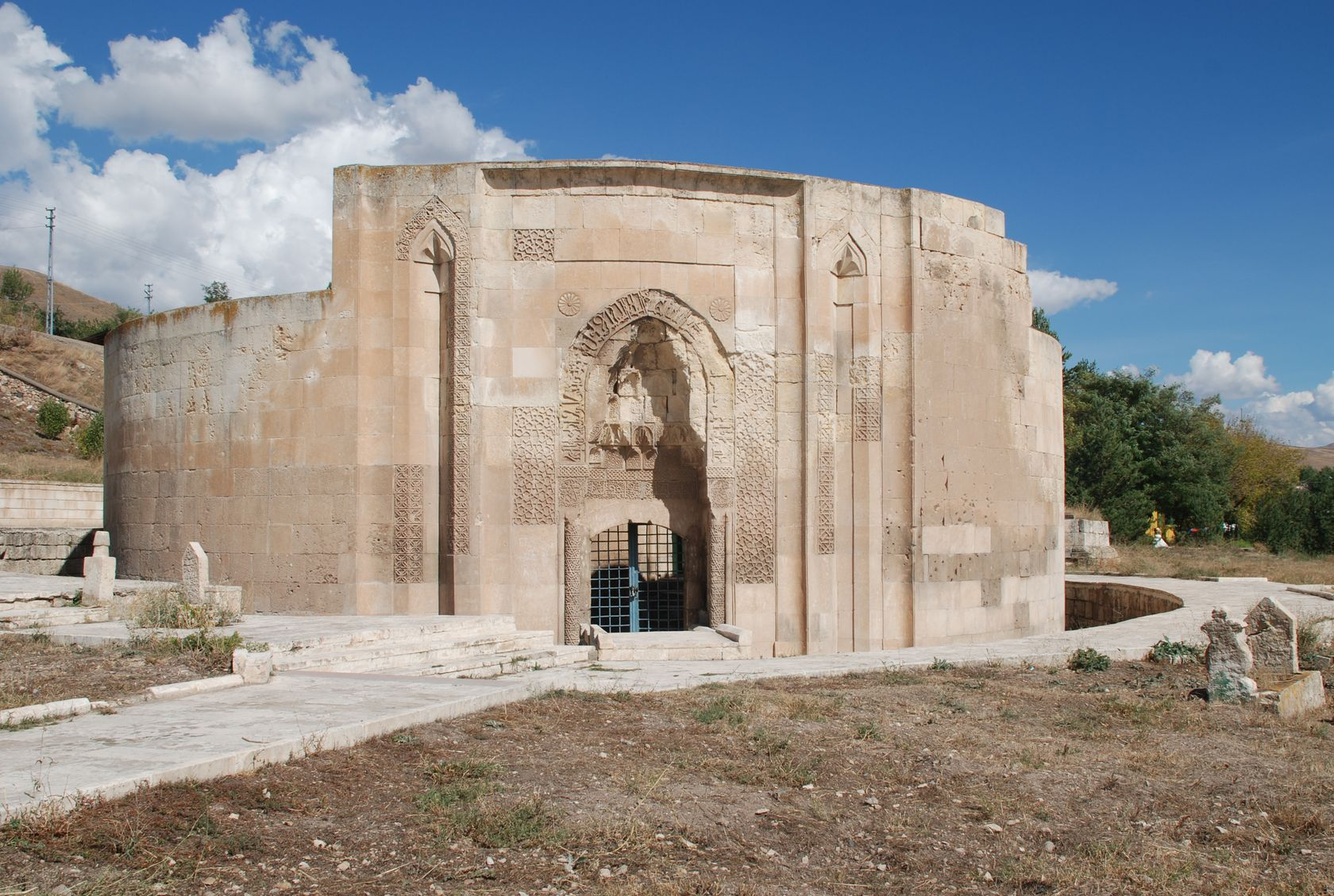
Outer wall and entrance portal to the Mama Hatun tomb

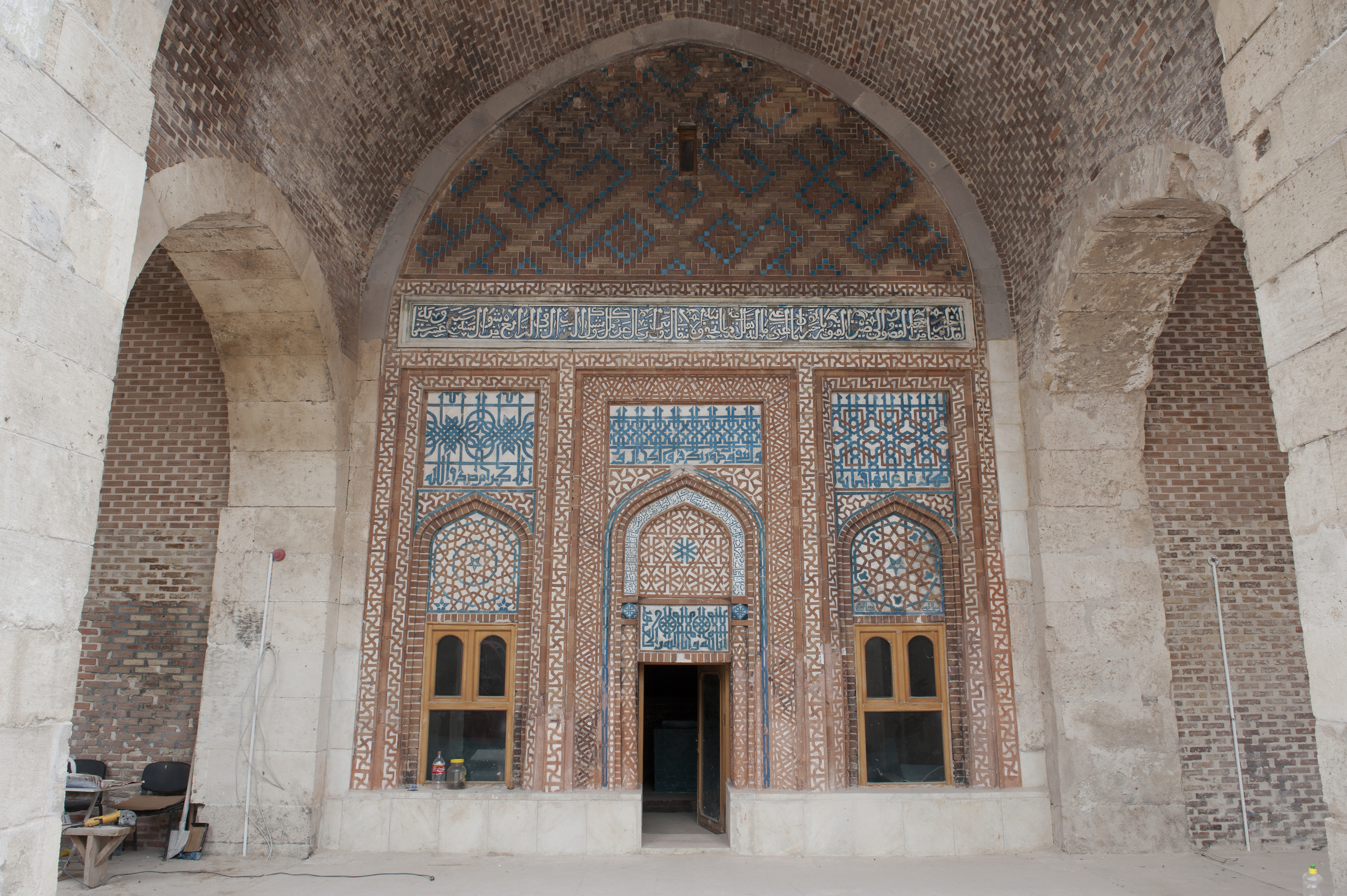
Decorated brick and tile façade of the tomb of Izz al-Din Kayka'us I in Sivas (1217–1218)

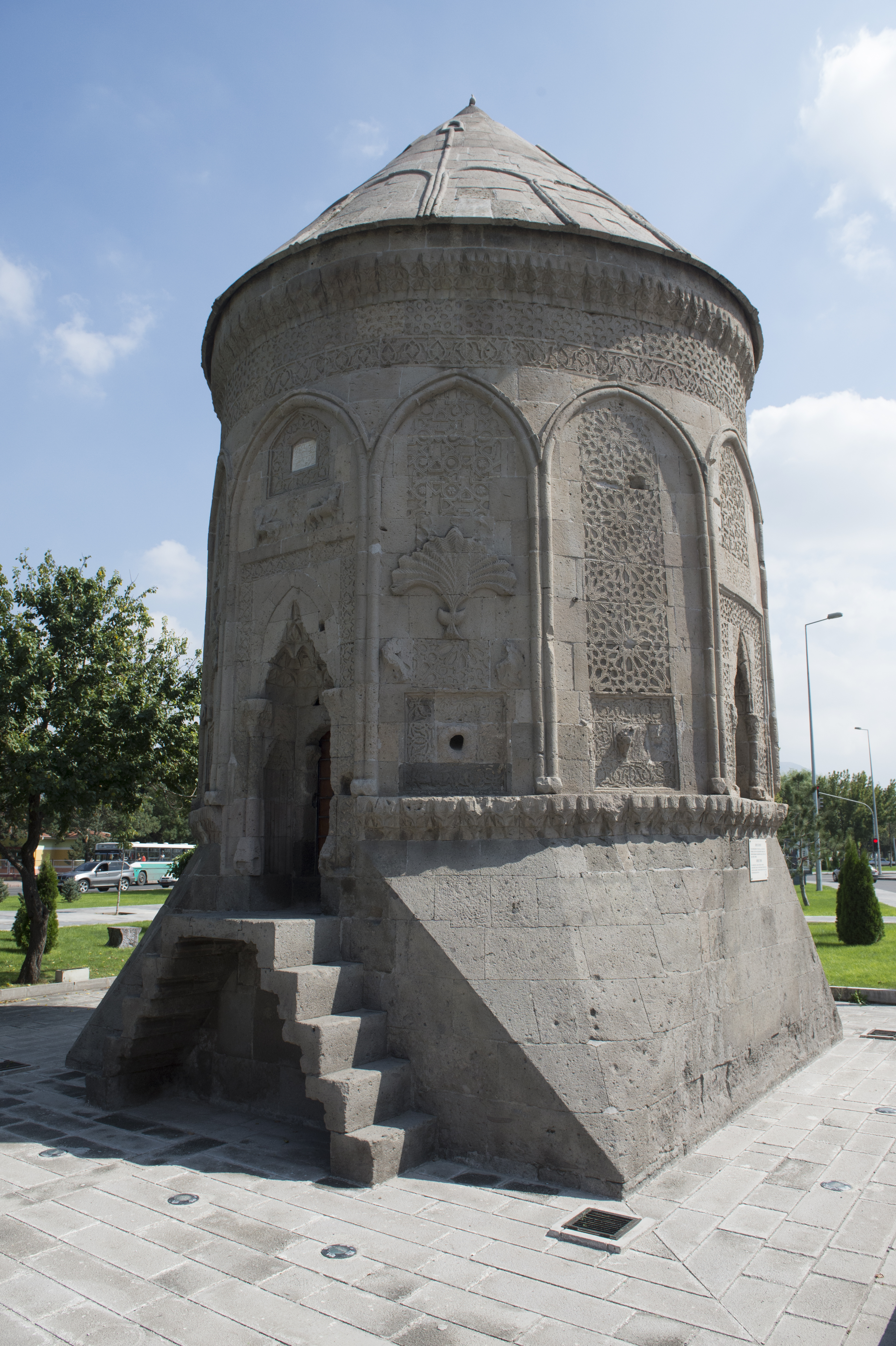
Döner Kümbet in Kayseri (1276), the tomb of a Seljuk princess

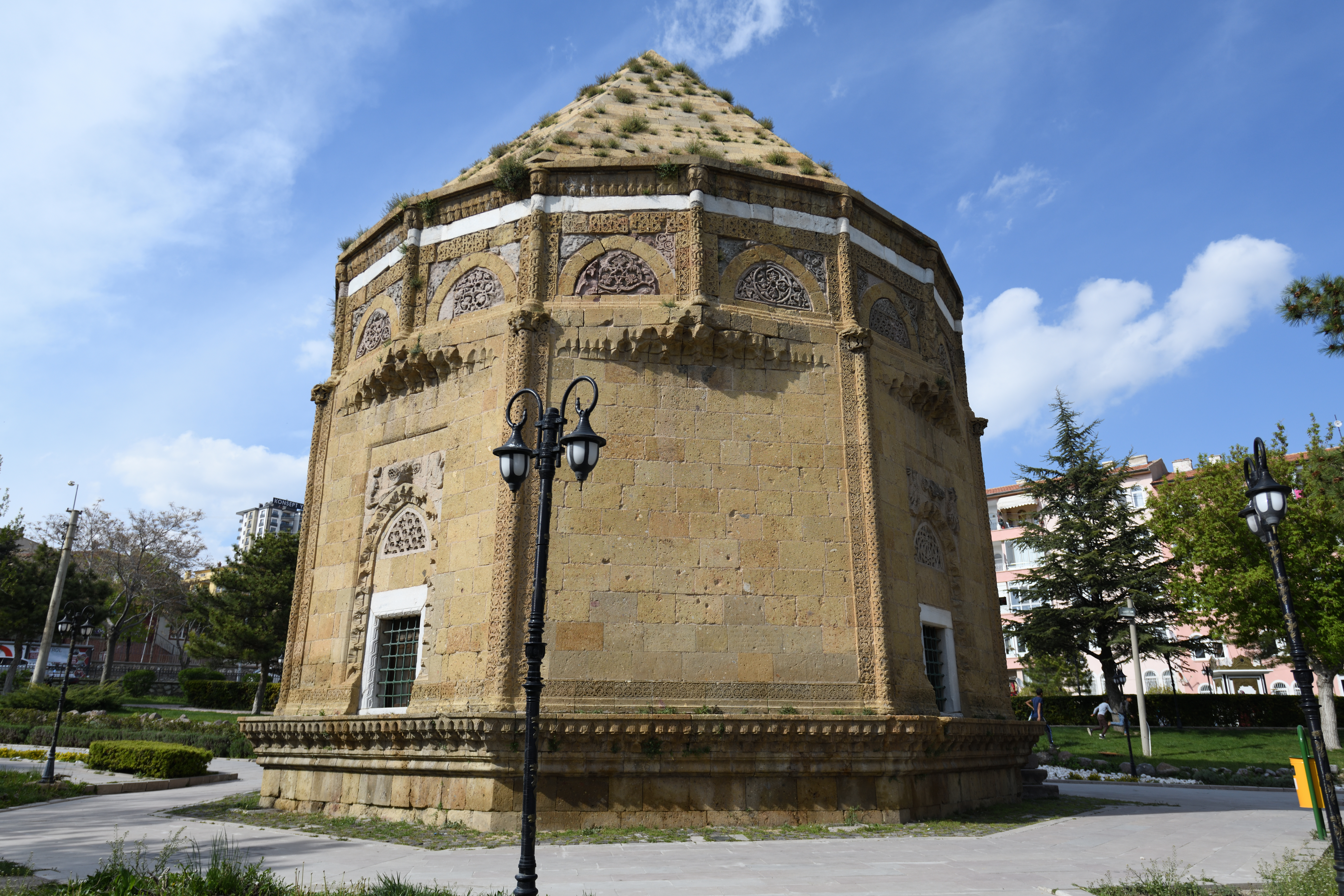
Hudavend Hatun Tomb in Niğde (1312)

== Caravanserais ==
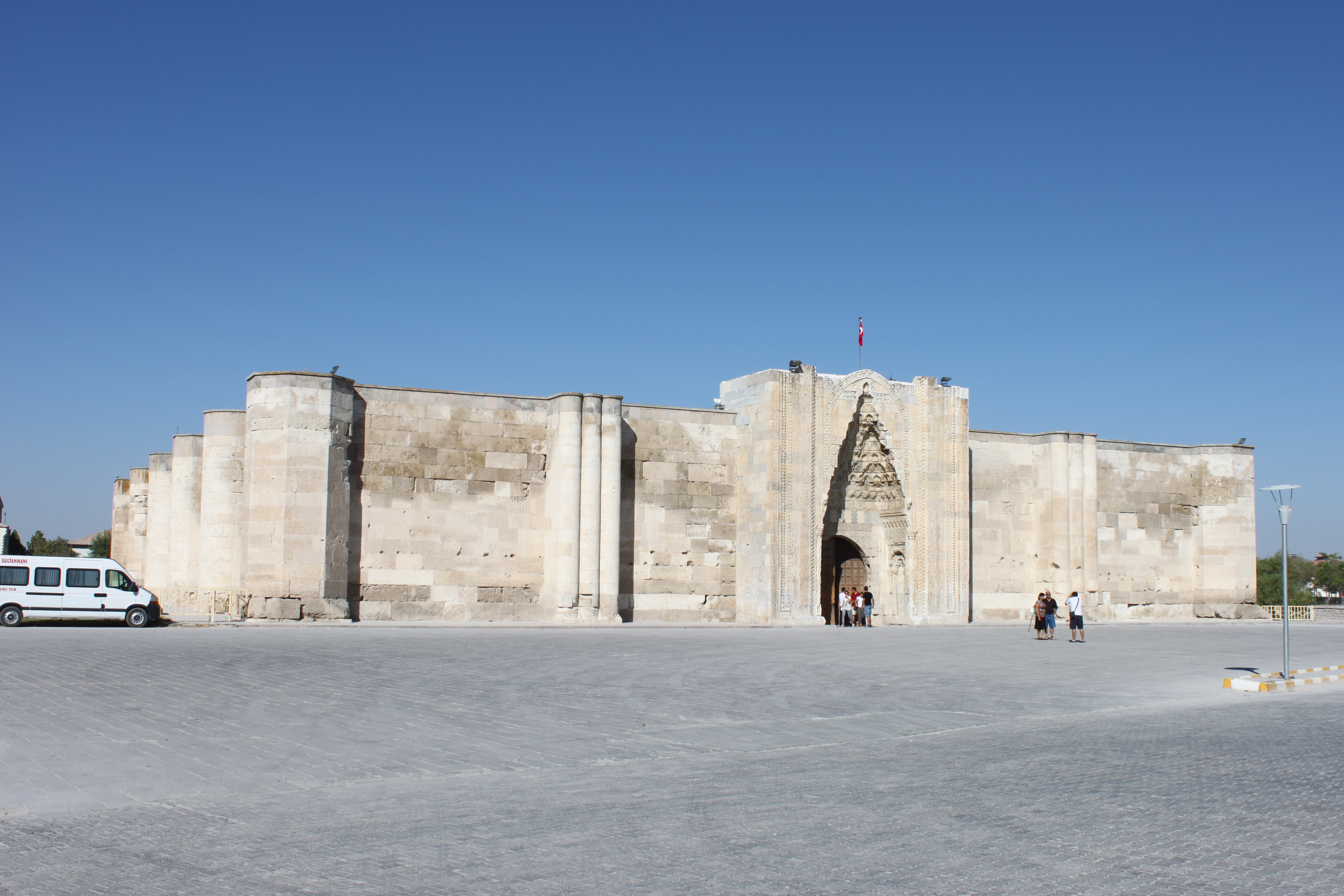
Exterior of Sultan Han caravanserai (1229) on the road between Aksaray and Konya

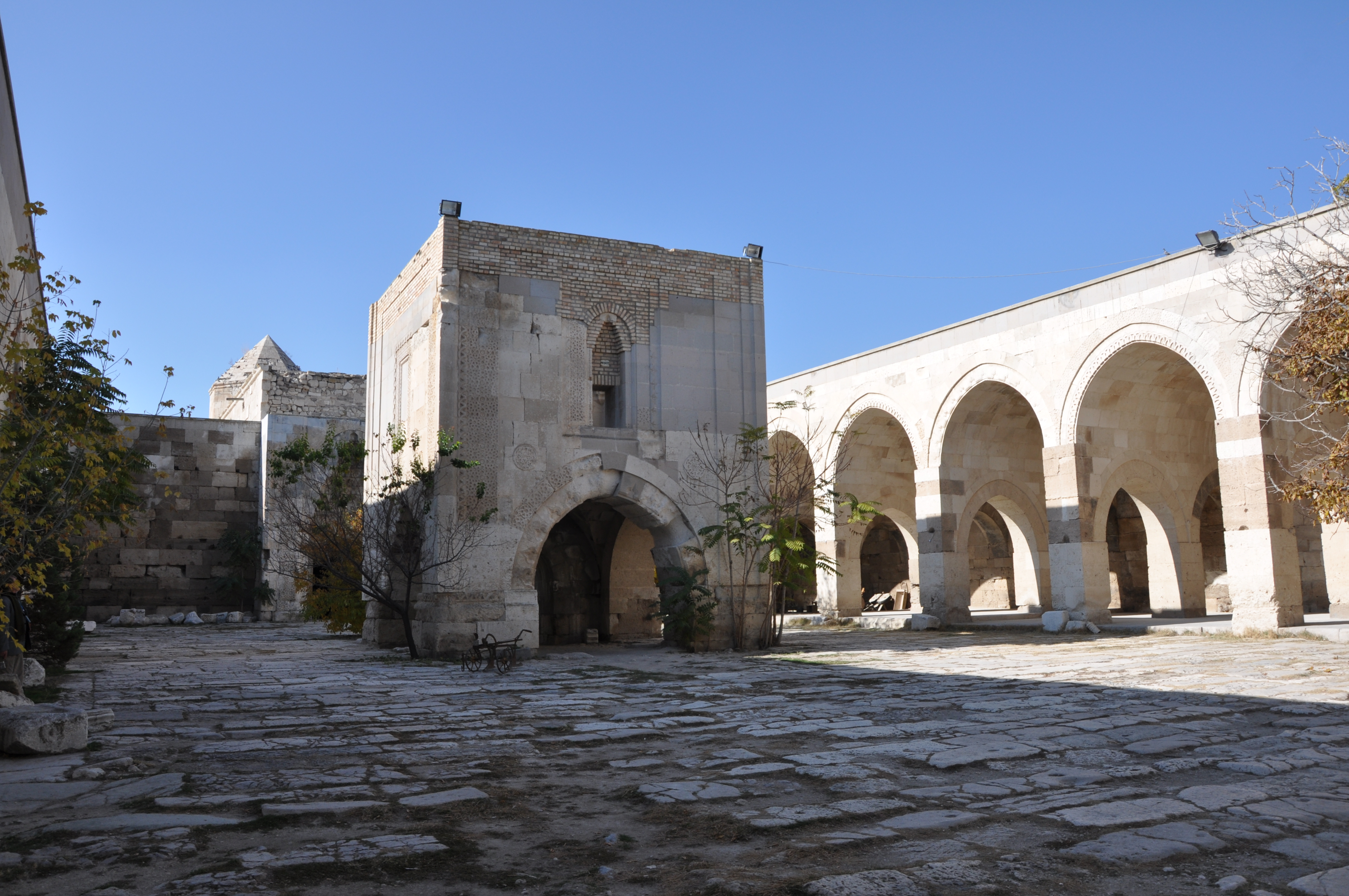
Courtyard of the Sultan Han

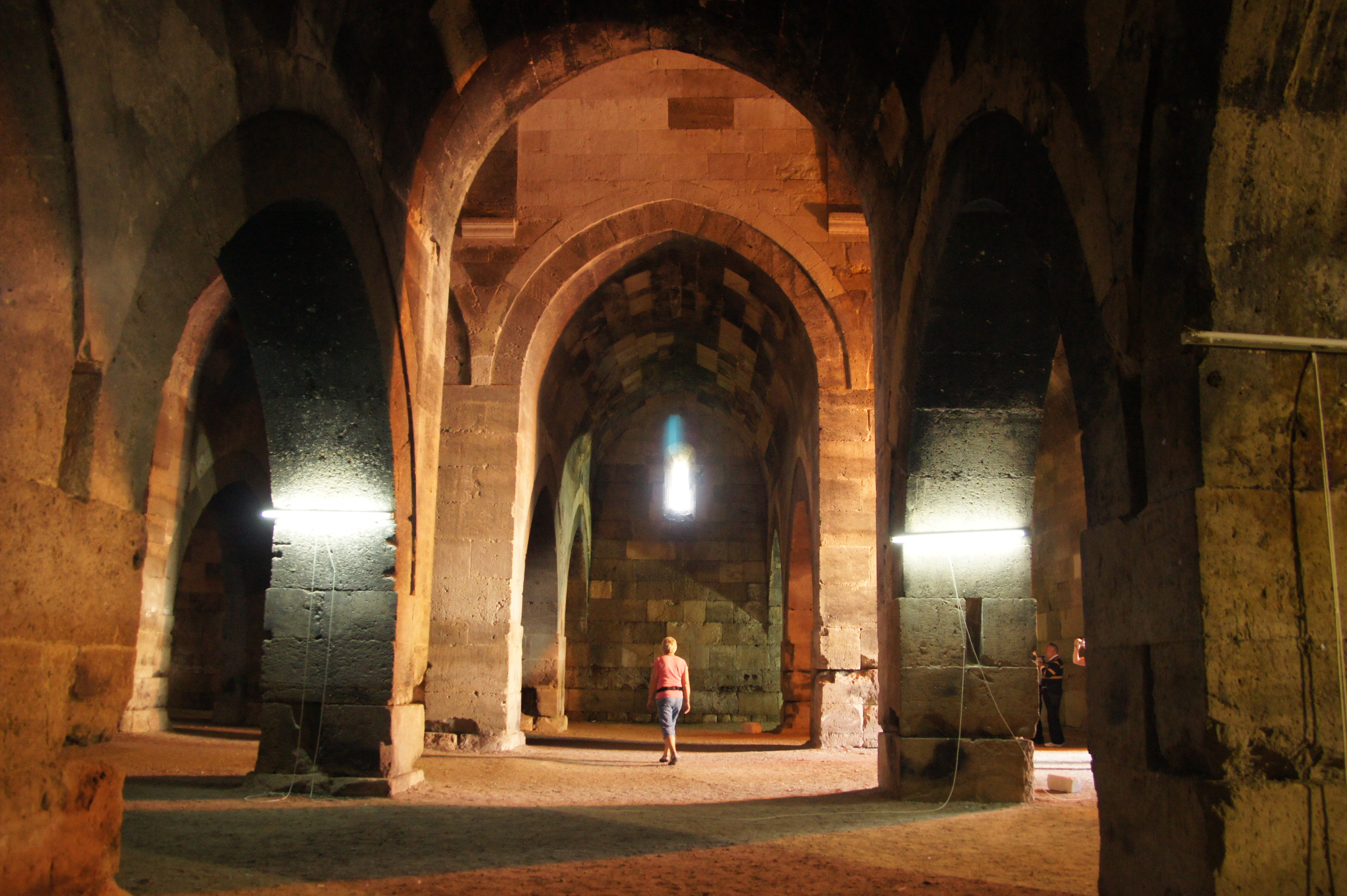
Covered hall of the Sultan Han

Some of the most impressive Seljuk monuments were caravanserais built along many trade routes between cities. Hundreds of them were built in the 13th century. Only about a hundred of them exist today in varying states of preservation. Several are mostly intact or have been restored. Enough remains of these caravanserais to establish both plan and superstructure. Unfortunately, the majority of caravanserais had no founding inscription or it has since been destroyed. The majority of Seljuk caravanserais were built between 1220 and 1250, which was the height of the Seljuk empire.

These buildings were meant to encourage trade in the Seljuq empire. They were constructed on the principal trade lines and catered to travelers from around the world. They also served other purposes such as military uses, government houses for the sultan and his retinue, royal guesthouses for visiting monarchs, prisons, and places of refuge. They offered meals, shelter, medical care, bathing, and other such services to all types of travelers. Most of these structures also included a mosque or at least a space to perform religious rituals.

Seljuk caravanserais are unique in plan and design, although with influences from earlier Iranian and Armenian architecture. Their exact layout and details varied but certain features were commonly shared. Providing safety and shelter were the basic function, demonstrated by the thick stone masonry walls with a single entrance and slit windows. This single entrance controlled access and was closed at night. The roofs of caravanserais were also occasionally used for defense, accessible by stairs and sometimes equipped with platforms for guards to monitor the roads. The walls typically have buttresses and were topped with crenellations. The buildings are constructed with large stone ashlars. Domes were covered by conical roofs on tall drums. On the outside, Seljuk caravanserais had little decoration, except for the main entrance portal, which was the most prominent feature and could be richly ornamented. Carved decoration could included floral and geometric motifs, a muqarnas canopy, and inscriptions. The buildings were usually arranged around a central courtyard, sometimes with a large covered hall on one side, both rectangular in shape. The entrance portal leads into the courtyard. On the far side of the courtyard, another entrance led to the covered hall, which typically consists of several aisles of pillars covered by vaulted ceilings and a lantern dome at the center. Befitting their role as shelter for travelers, the caravanserais had stables for animals, places for packing and unpacking goods, and lodging for guests. The sheltered galleries were composed of two levels: the ground level housed the stables and the upper level was a platform that housed goods and people. These different levels maintained differing degrees of cleanliness, as they separated the animals and people. Many caravanserais also had water systems, including drainage and sewage.

Some caravanserais were simple rectangular buildings with no courtyard, consisting of a hall with vaulted aisles. One example, the Alayhan caravanserai, possibly built by Kiliç Arslan II around 1190, features one of the oldest muqarnas-decorated portals in Anatolian Islamic architecture. Another example is the Susuz Han (c. 1246) on the road between Antalya and Burdur, although its lack of a courtyard may be due to an unfinished construction or to a later demolition. Others caravanserais consist of a large courtyard surrounded by roofed arcades but without a large roofed hall. There are relatively few examples of this type, including the Evdir Han (1215–1219) and the Kırkgöz Han (possibly built between 1237 and 1246), both also located on the Antalya–Burdur road.

The most monumental caravanserais combined both of these types, with major examples including the Sultan Han on the Konya–Aksaray road (1229), the Sultan Han near Kayseri (1236–1237), the Ağzıkara Han northeast of Aksaray (completed in 1240), and the Karatay Han east of Kayseri (completed c. 1240). They have a fortress-like exterior appearance with semi-round bastions and an entrance portal of decorated carved stone leading to an open-air inner courtyard. In the center of these courtyards there is sometimes a small cubic prayer room raised above the ground on four pillars. On the opposite side of the entrance another portal led to a covered hall with many aisles running perpendicular to a central aisle with a central dome.

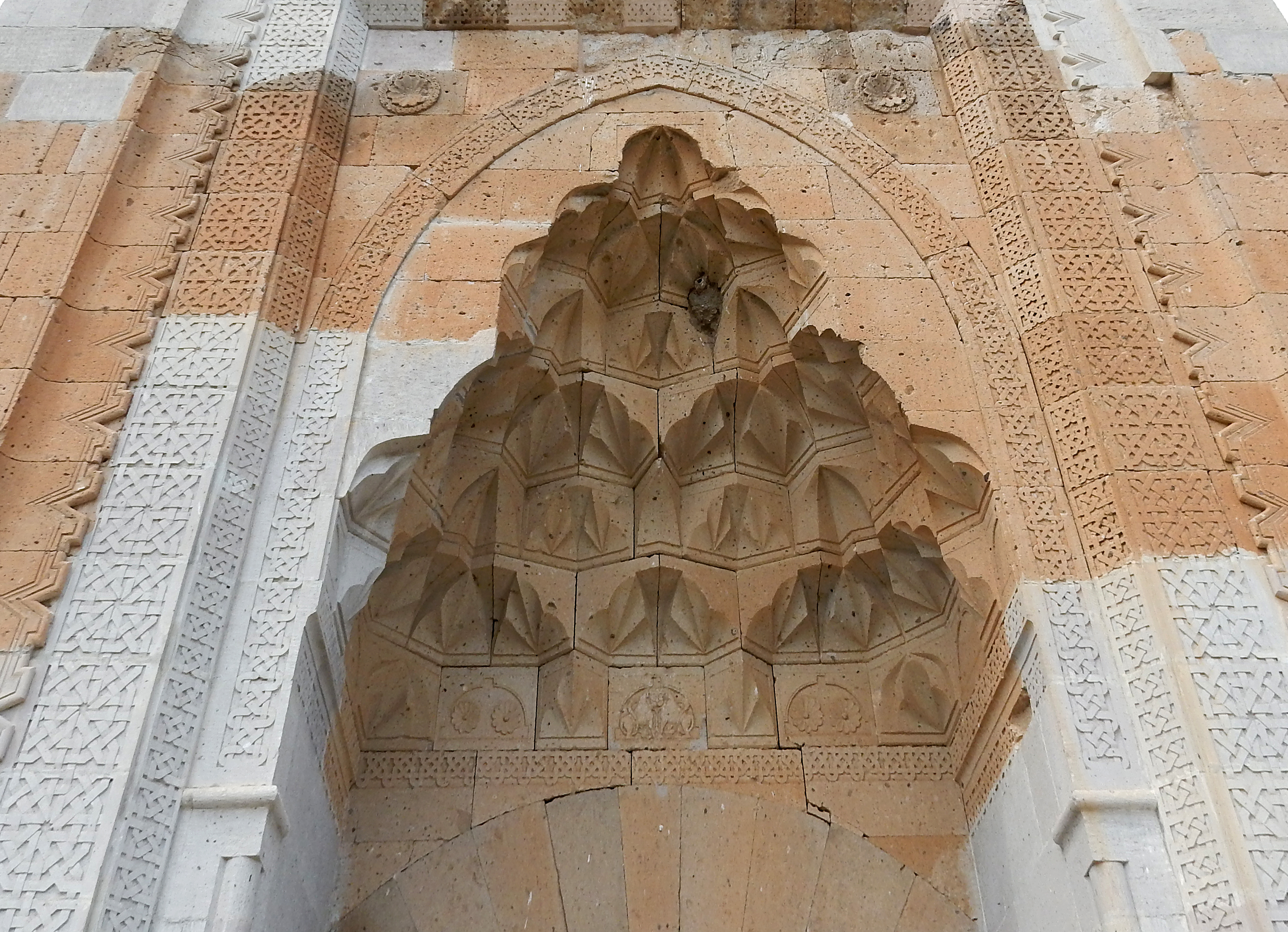
Muqarnas portal (partly reconstructed) of the Alayhan, possibly circa 1190

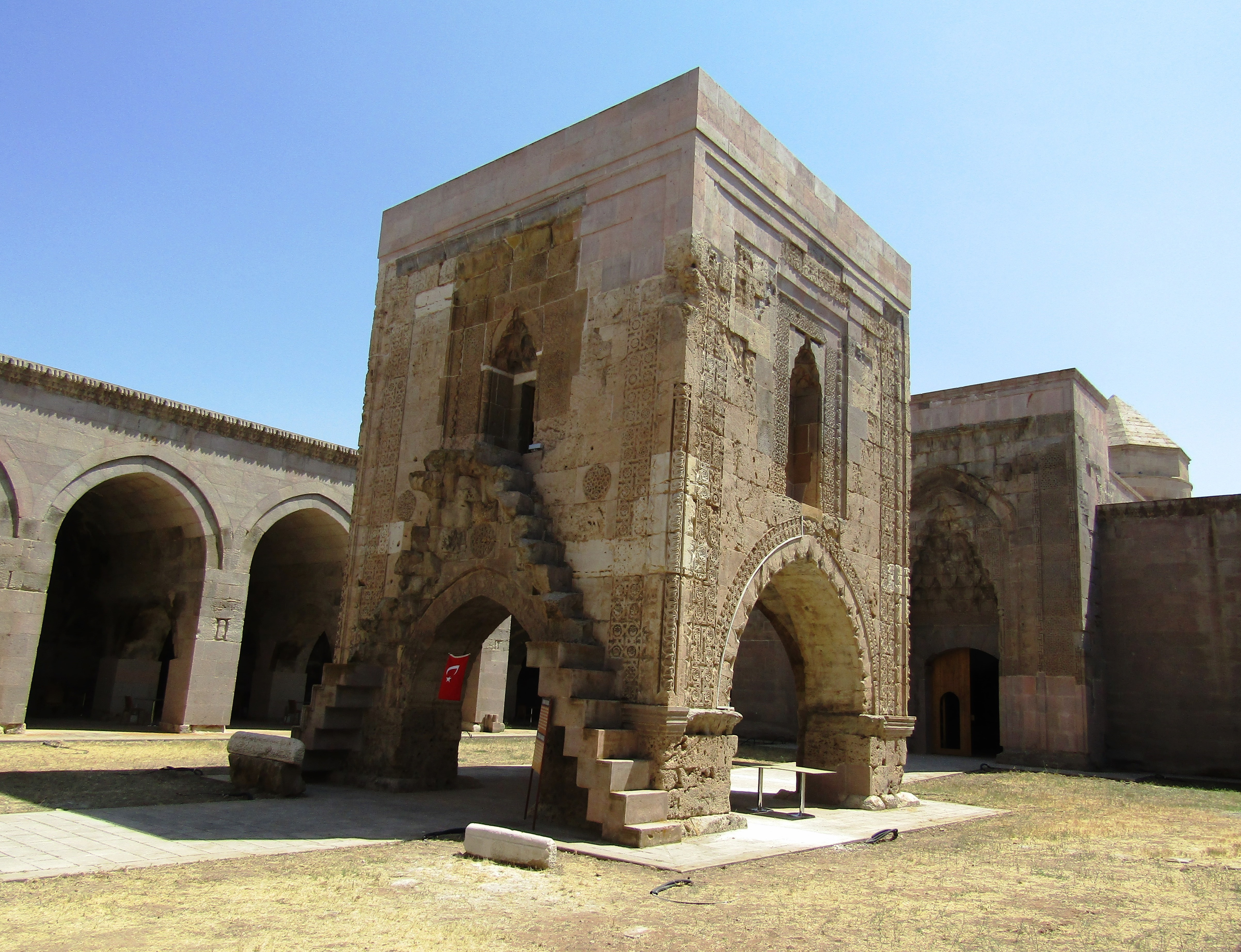
Elevated prayer room in the centre of the Sultan Han near Kayseri (1236–1237)

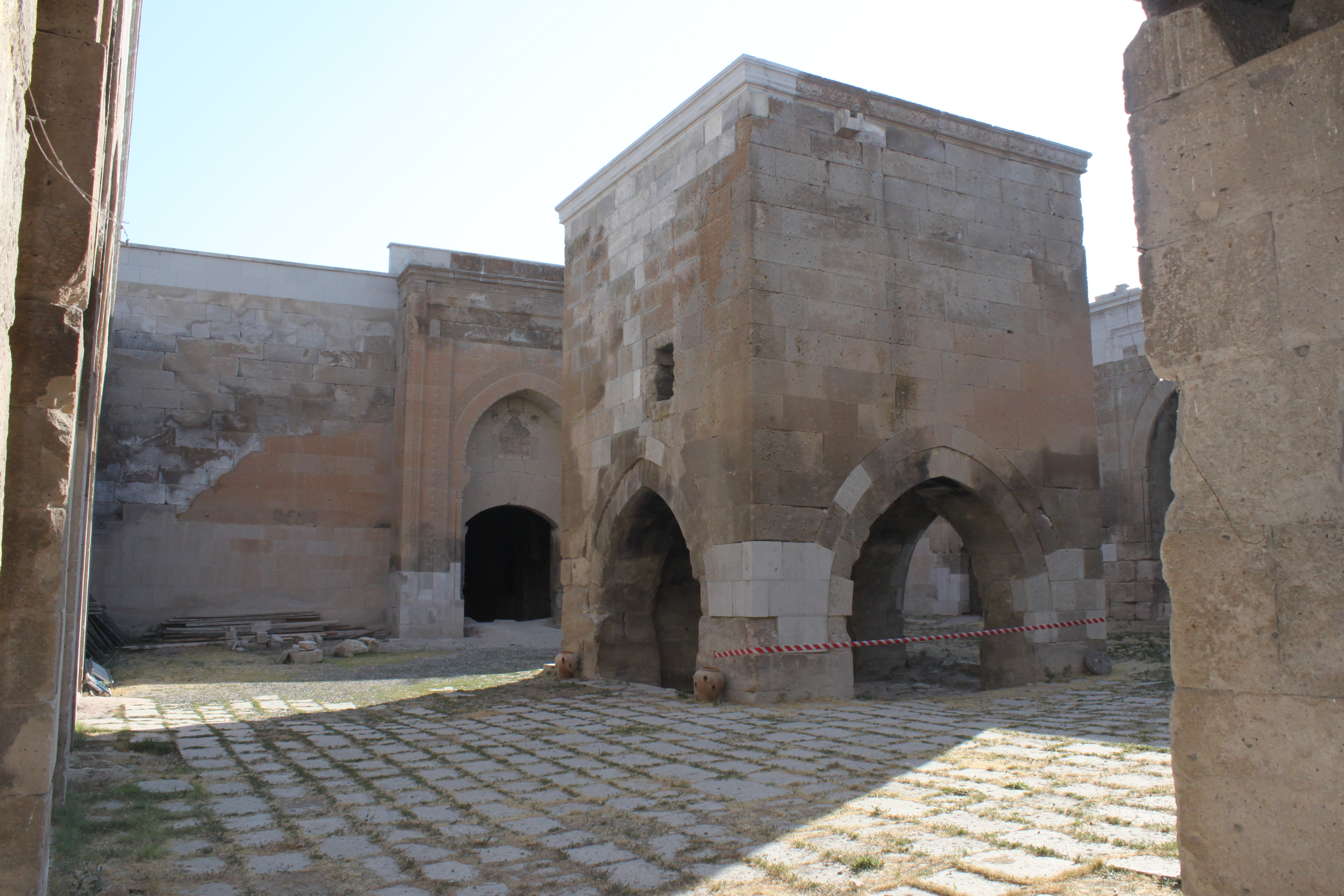
Courtyard of the Ağzıkara Han, completed in 1240

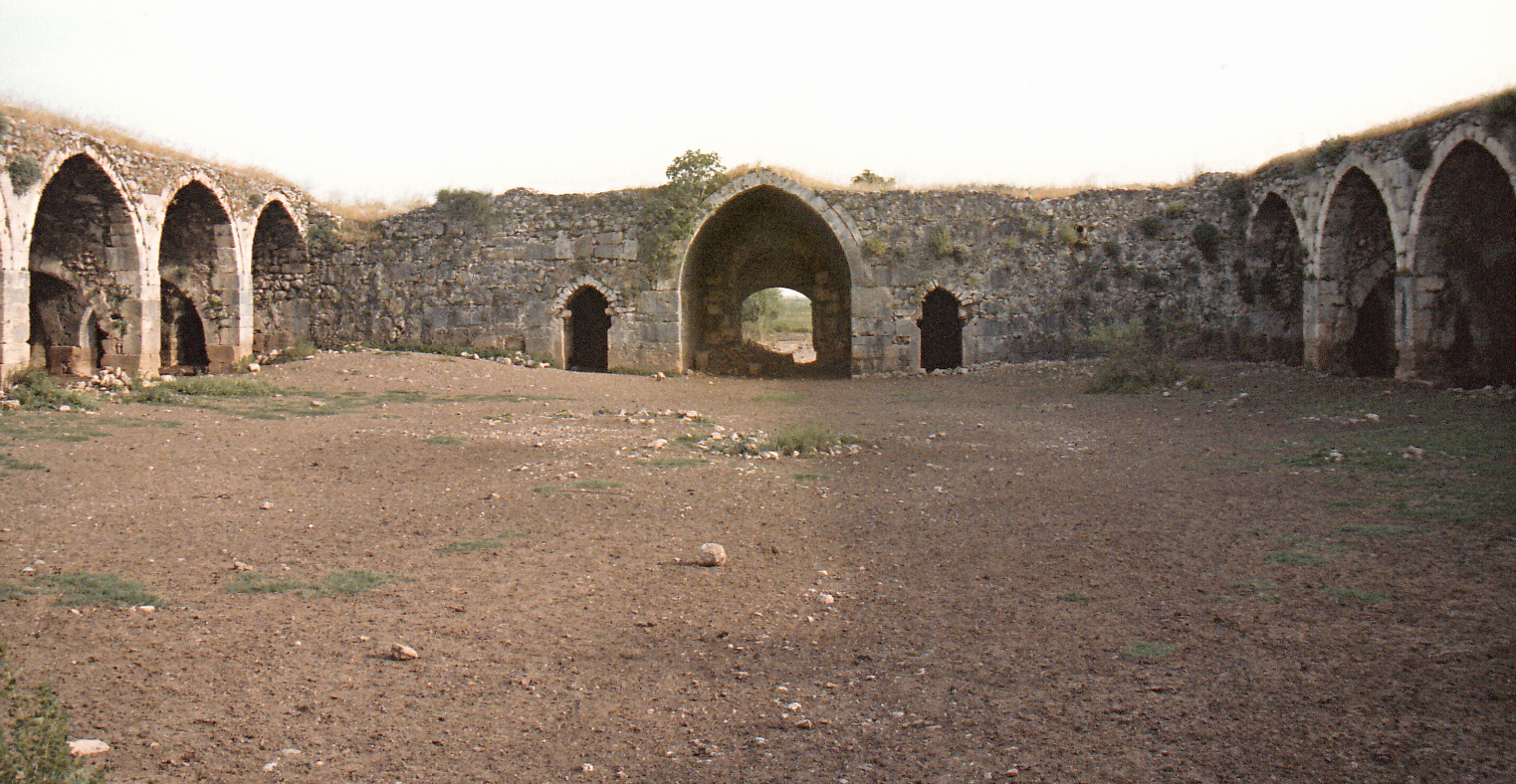
Courtyard of the Kırkgöz Han (between 1237 and 1246)

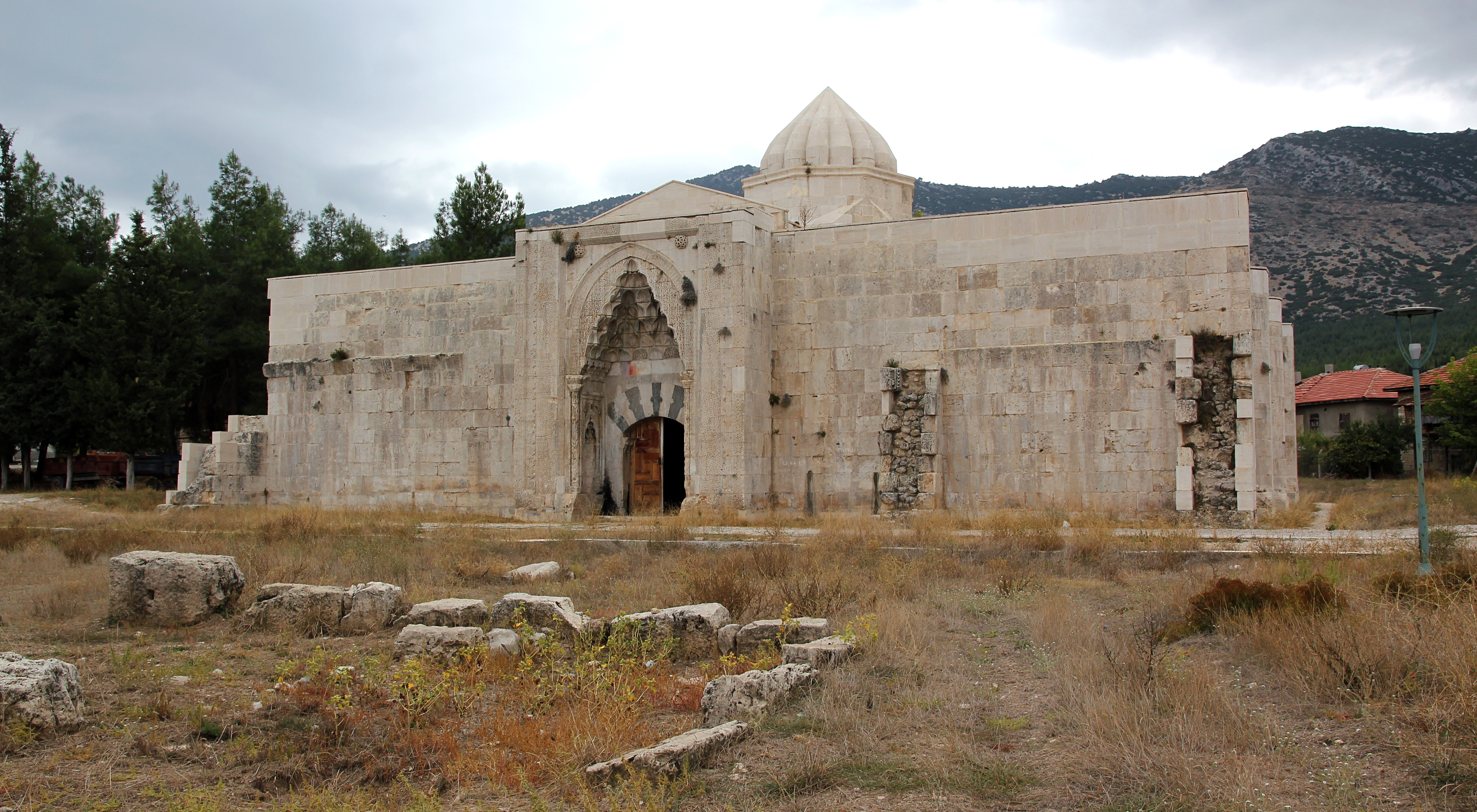
Susuz Han (c. 1246)

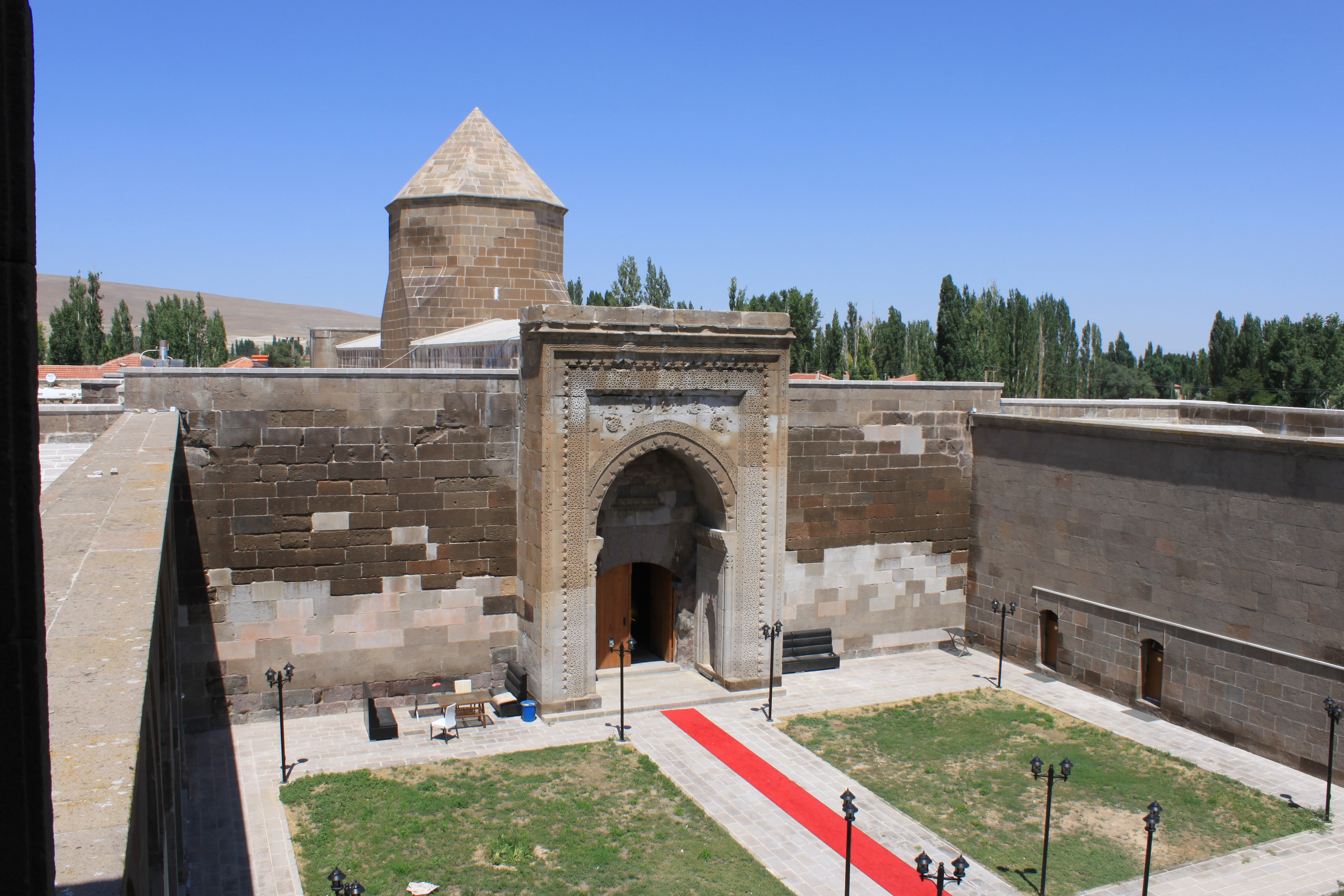
Courtyard and entrance to the covered hall of Karatay Han (c. 1240)

== Fortifications and palaces ==
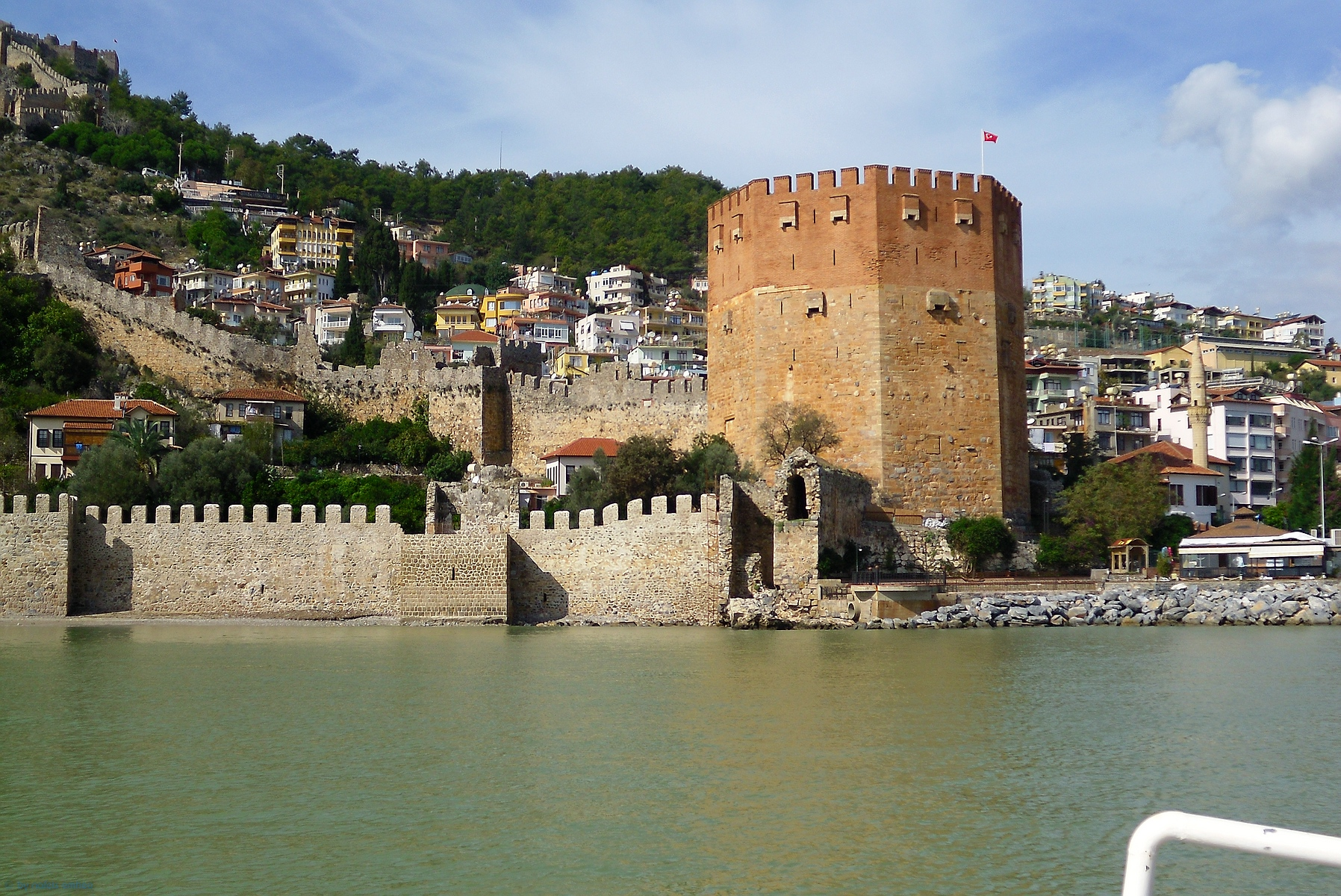
Kızıl Kule (Red Tower), built between 1221–1226 by Kayqubad I in Alanya

Among the Seljuk military fortifications, one of the best preserved examples is an ensemble of 13th-century structures in the coastal town of Alanya, which includes walls, a seaside tower or bastion (Kızıl Kule), and a naval arsenal or shipyard (tersane). In southeastern Anatolia, the city of Diyarbakir has preserved significant parts of its defensive walls. The walls date from various periods but they feature several towers built by the Artuqids, which are decorated with a mix of calligraphic inscriptions and figurative images of animals and mythological creatures carved in stone.

Little has survived of Seljuk palaces, which in some cases were built inside citadels. In Konya, the Seljuk royal palace and citadel once stood next to the Alaeddin Mosque on the hill overlooking the centre of the city. Only parts of one of its pavilions, the Alaeddin Köşkü or Alaeddin Kiosk, have been preserved. This pavilion was built by Kiliç Arslan II (r. 1156–1192) on top of one of the citadel's towers. Other palaces are no longer standing but in some cases have been excavated and documented. The Kaykubadiye or Kayqubadiyya was a summer palace built near Kayseri by Ala' al-Din Kayqubadh (r. 1220–1237). It consisted of three small buildings built around an artificial lake, including a mosque, a boathouse, and another structure with two rooms and tile decoration. The Kubadabad Palace was another summer palace built by the same sultan on the shores of Lake Beyşehir. It consisted of 16 small buildings enclosed by a fortified wall, including residential units decorated with tiles.

== Bridges ==
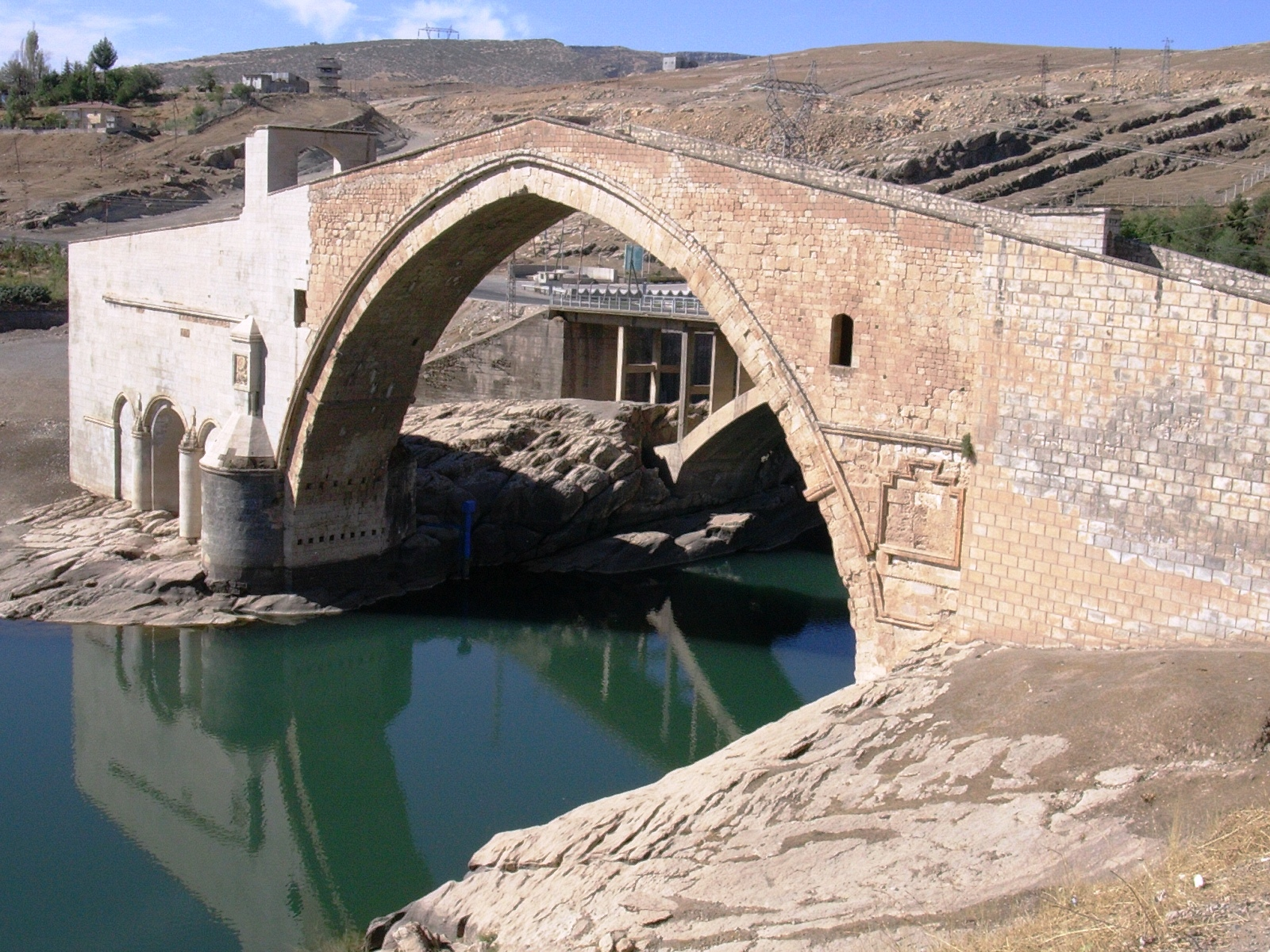
Malabadi Bridge (1147), near Silvan

In Anatolia, both the Seljuks and Artuqids built numerous bridges across rivers. The most common type of bridge was the single-span bridge with a pointed arch shape, or one in which the main span was a large pointed arch. An early example of this is the Malabadi Bridge (1147) built by the Artuqids over the Batman River east of Silvan. This form of bridge existed already in Roman and Byzantine times and it continued to be employed in the later Ottoman period (e.g. the famous Mostar bridge). For shallower rivers with weaker currents, flatter multi-arch bridges could be more practical. An example of this is the Dicle Bridge, the oldest Islamic-era bridge in Anatolia, which was built over the Tigris River in 1065–1067. This type of bridge became common during the Beylik period and also continued to be built under the Ottomans. Another notable bridge and early Turkish/Islamic-era bridge in Anatolia is the ruined Old Bridge in Hasankeyf, built by the Artuqids between 1155 and 1175, notable for its tall massive piers and instances of figurative decoration.

== Stonework imagery ==
Islamic cultures used figural representations in their art but less commonly in religious contexts. The Anatolaian Seljuks and the neighbouring Artuqids were unprecedented in their prolific use of these motifs and employed them even in their religious art and architecture. One key way in which figures were represented in Seljuk architecture is through stone reliefs. The Seljuks displayed these artforms on their doorways, the most noticeable of places. This practice can be traced to the Christian-Armenian tradition and was adopted by the Seljuks with their conquest of the region. This type of stonework was used on profane and religious buildings and on fortifications like city walls, often on doorways, gates and entrances. This tradition of figural imagery eventually declined after the region came under Ilkhanid domination.

=== Human motifs ===
Human motifs were rarely used in Seljuk architecture. When they were used, they were often displayed in groups or pairs using a mirrored arrangement. Examples of this include the Alaeddin Mosque in Niğde and on the gate of the hospital in the Great Mosque complex of Divriği. This type of imagery was related to the Seljuks belief in astrology and depicted astrological and planetary symbols on the stonework. Infrequently, they would depict specific human figures, as seen in another on the gate of the Divriği hospital. This example is thought to be a portrait of a specific person rather than of planetary figures.

=== Lions ===
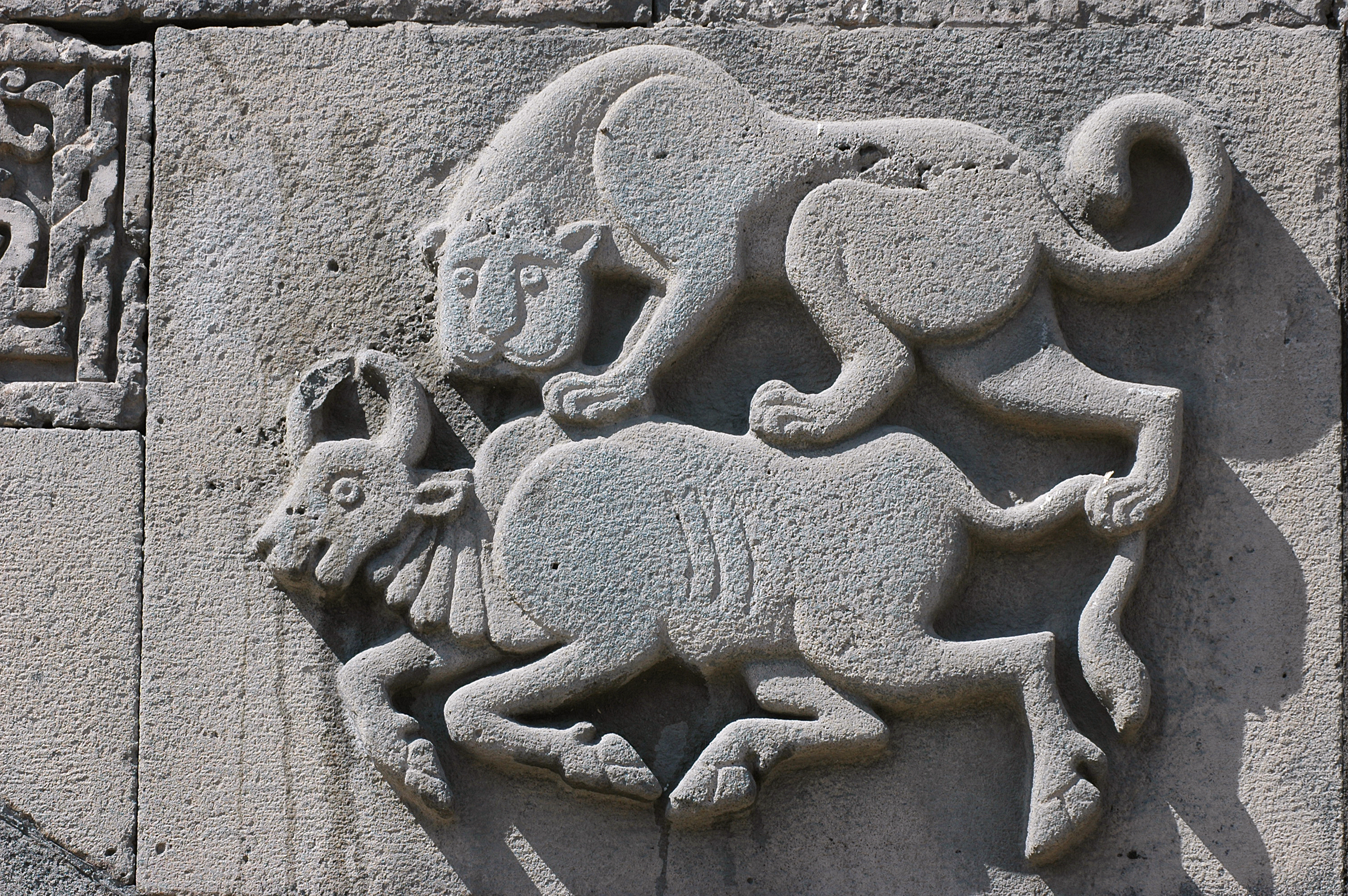
Lion fighting a bull on the entrance of the Great Mosque of Diyarbakir

Animal motifs were the most utilized type of imagery in the Seljuk Empire and a favorite included the lion. They were typically depicted in full relief, were used as gargoyles, and had a similar style to traditional Armenian lion sculptures. Like the human motifs, the use of the lion imagery is often associated with the zodiac symbol for the sun. Examples include the lion reliefs on the Çifte Medrese of Kayseri, two reliefs of a lion fighting a bull at the Great Mosque of Diyarbakir, and reliefs of lions with the tree of life and a crescent moon shape at the Döner Kümbet tomb in Kayseri.

=== Eagles / birds of prey ===
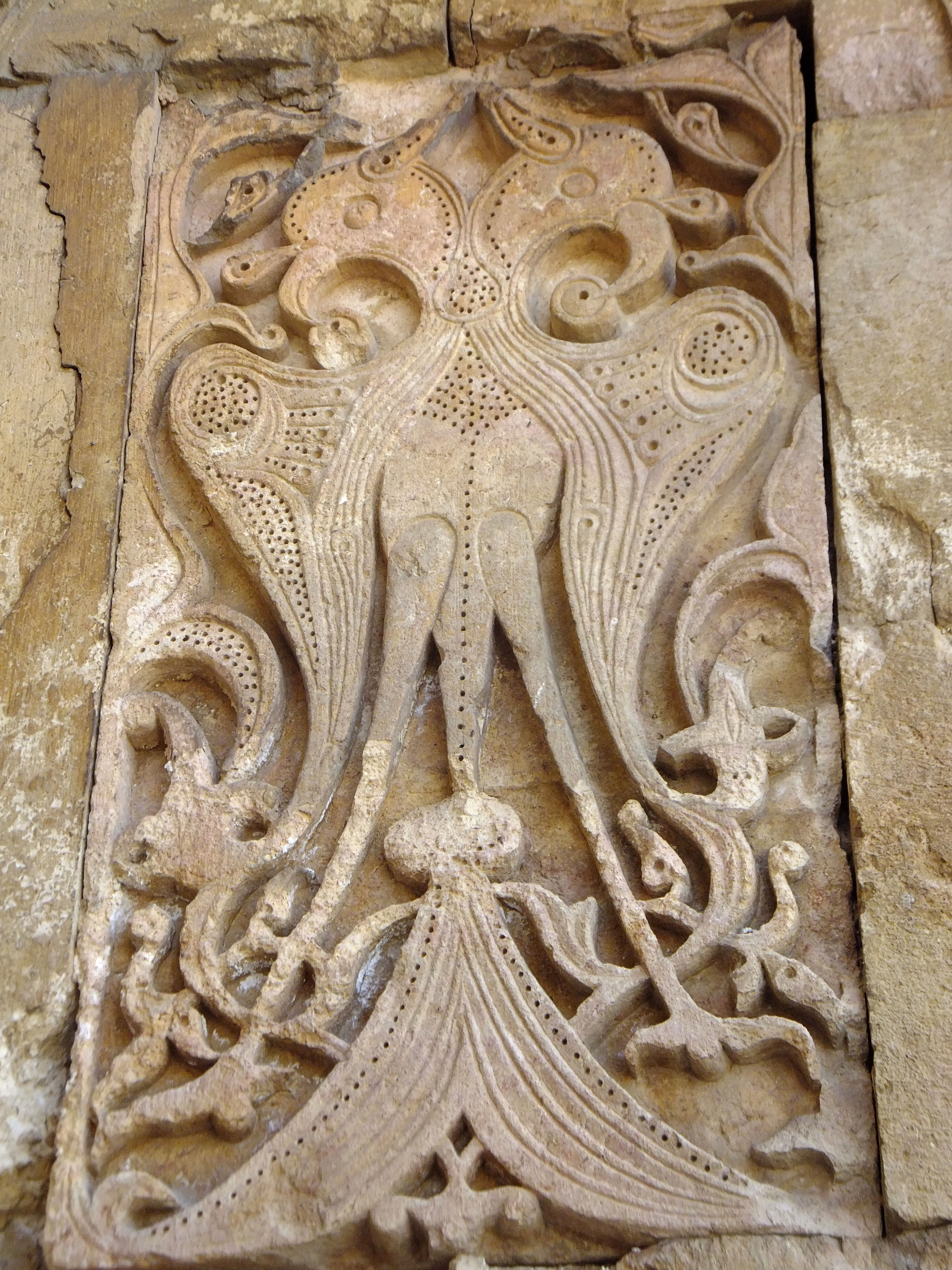
A double-headed eagle relief, 13th-century, Divriği Great Mosque and Hospital

Often linked to tombs, bird of prey reliefs had varied uses and meanings to the Seljuks. The eagle was originally a symbol of the Oghuz, a Turkish tribe that the Seljuks originated from, thus linking the usage and tradition of this symbol to pre-Islamic Central Asia. This symbol was most often used on tombs and mausoleums, showing the belief that birds were a type of heavenly guide. Examples of eagle reliefs are found on the Tomb of Emir Saltuq in Erzurum and the Tomb of Hudavend Hatun in Niğde.

While the eagle is typically shown on structures relating to death, the double-headed eagle had a more complex meaning and is traditionally shown on more sacred architecture. They are depicted as fierce animals, like the lions, and are thought to be a protective motif (this is especially felt when they are displayed on non-sacred structures, like city walls and palaces). Sometimes these birds were hybridized with other threatening animals, like dragons. When used on mausoleums and tombs, double-headed birds are connected to the single bird of prey meaning and are thought of as soul-birds. Examples of the double-headed eagle motif as a symbol of power are found on the Artuqid towers of the Diyarbakir city walls. They also appear in the western entrance portal of the Great Mosque of Divriği against a background of arabesques, and on the Döner Kümbet in Kayseri above the tree of life.

=== Dragon ===
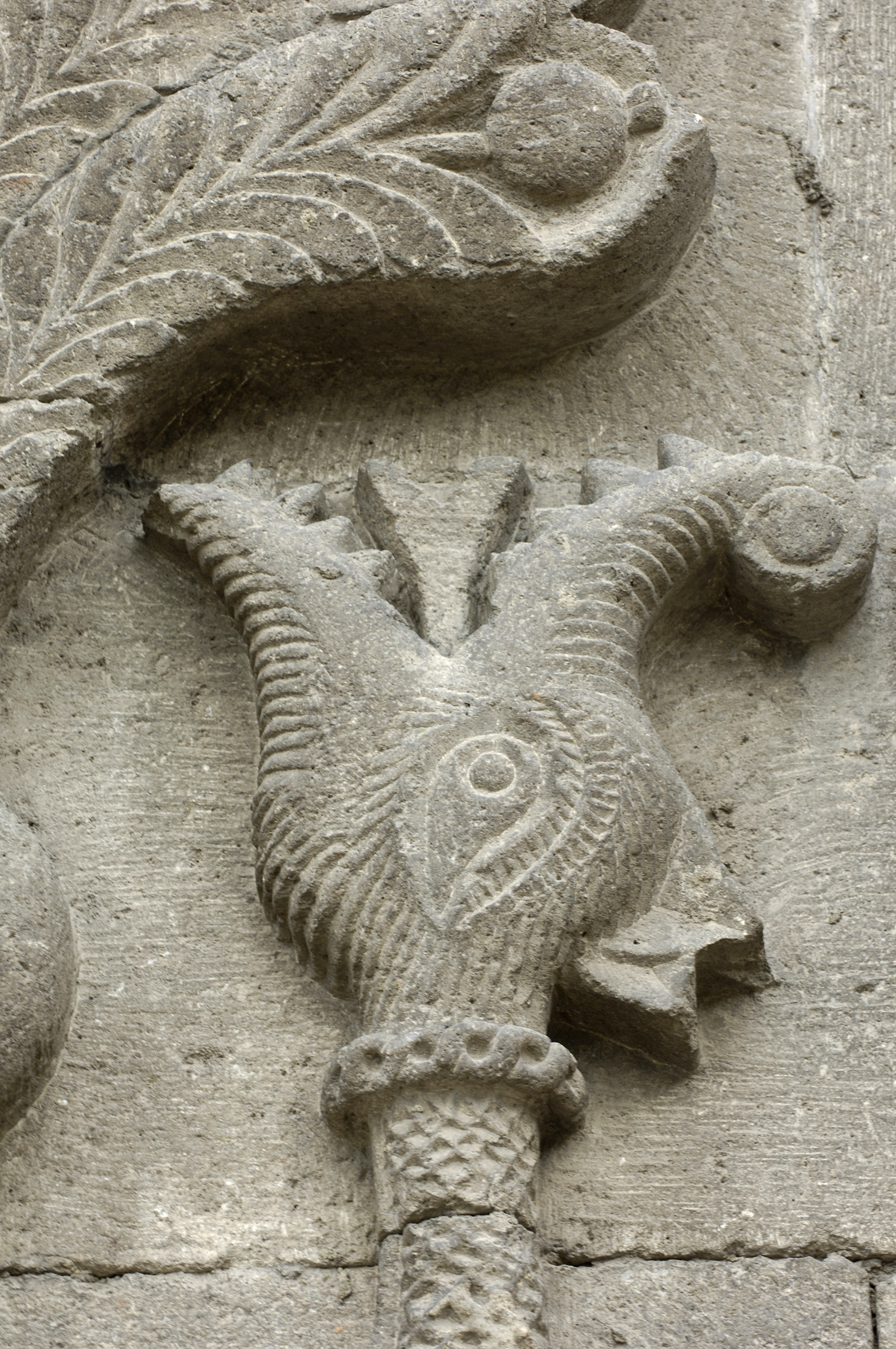
Head of a dragon carved on the façade of the Çifte Minareli Medrese in Erzurum

Showing up rarely in sacred Seljuk architecture, the dragon motif is more commonly used on profane buildings, like city walls and palaces. No matter where the dragons were shown, they were almost always arranged in pairs and facing each other, as if to fight. The Seljuk dragons had vicious heads with open mouths, and a twisted, knotted, or snake-like body and tail. Sometimes they had wings and sometimes they were shown with horns. This type of imagery is closely linked to early Chinese dragons, where similarly twisted and ferocious dragons were displayed above tomb doorways. The dragon was often hybridized with other animals to give those symbols a fierce and protective appearance. When used in sacred structures, the dragon is also linked to the zodiac and the pseudo-planet Jawzahar; its head and tail are thought to represent the ascending and descending nodes of the moon. Examples of carved dragon reliefs include a pair of mirrored dragons on the entrance façade of the Çifte Minareli Medrese in Erzurum and another pair confronting each other on the arches of the kiosk mosque in the center of the Sultan Han near Kayseri.

=== Siren ===
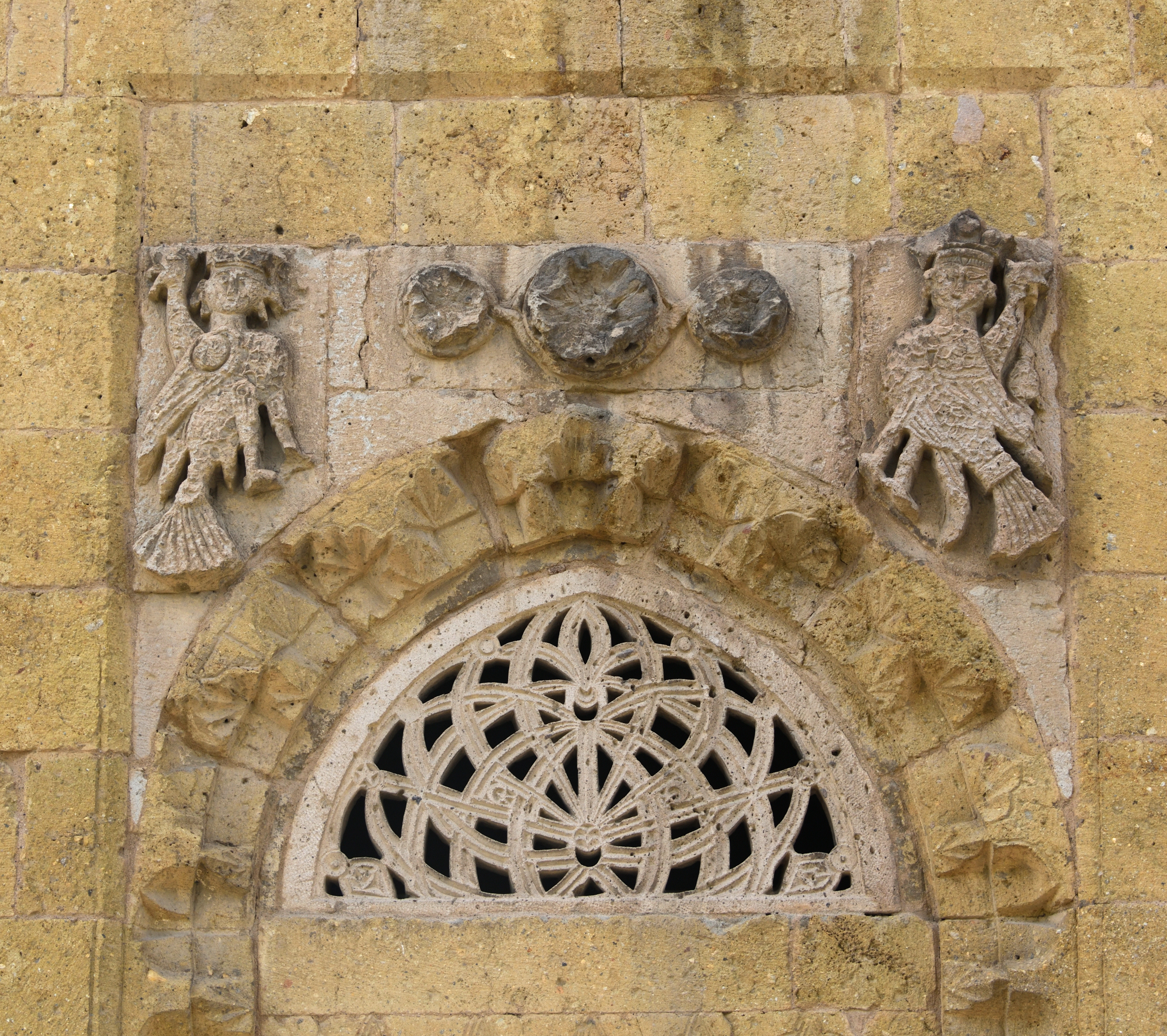
Pair of mirrored sirens above a niche on the Tomb of Hudavend Hatun

A mythical female creature, sirens are thought to ward off evil and were often displayed with crowns, fish tails, and occasionally wings. They were often depicted in hybridized forms. Sirens were also significant to the zodiac themes the Seljuks often portrayed, with sirens frequently representing the Gemini. The use of sirens in the Anatolian region dates to pre-Seljuk eras, with influence from Egyptian textiles and art from the 7th and 8th centuries and Turfan textiles from the 6th and 7th centuries. Examples of siren images can be found on the Tomb of Hudavend Hatun and on the tiles of the Kubadabad Palace.

=== Sphinx ===
Common in profane Seljuk architecture but rare in sacred buildings, the sphinx is another mythical creature the Seljuks utilized on their structures and art objects. An example of a sphinx relief on a structure, although deteriorated, can be found on the Döner Kümbet. The sphinx was thought to ward off evil and had protective characteristics, thus was most commonly used on city walls and palaces. This function is also evident in the image of a sphinx protecting a hero in battle carved on a tombstone housed at the Archaeological Museum of Afyonkarahisar. The sphinx also has a zodiac and planetary implication as well; the "Sphinx Wheel" motif, which appears on the "Wade cup" from Seljuk Iran (kept at the Cleveland Museum of Art), shows the creature symbolizing the sun in its rising position, peak, and setting position. The Sphinx, already and hybrid creature, was also frequently hybridized with the various other animal motifs in Seljuk architecture.

=== Animal cycle (zodiac) ===
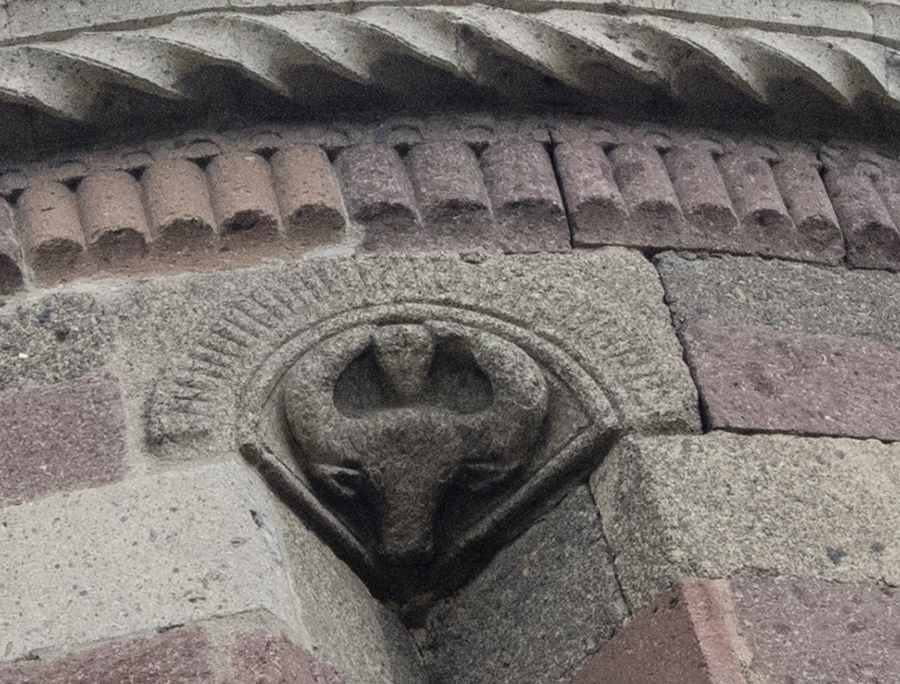
Head of a bull, one of the animals of the zodiac, carved onto the Tomb of Emir Saltuq

In conjunction with the 12-month zodiac, the Seljuks were also interested in the Chinese Zodiac, a 12-year cycle where each year is assigned an animal (Rat, Ox, Tiger, Rabbit, Dragon, Snake, Horse, Goat, Monkey, Rooster, Dog, and Pig). The Seljuks adopted these motifs and utilized them through relief work on several mausoleums, and, during the later Seljuk period under Mongol domination, this type of work was produced even more. Examples of it are seen on the Tomb of Emir Saltuq, on a tomb belonging to the Sultan Han near Kayseri, and on the Gök Medrese in Sivas.

== Minbars ==
The minbar (often translated as "pulpit") is one of the only consistently present furnishings in mosques. They consist of a short straight staircase, usually with a set of doors at the bottom and a small kiosk-like structure at the top. Anatolian minbars during the Seljuk era, as well as up to early Ottoman times, were made of wood and were decorated with deeply carved arabesque motifs and geometric patterns. In overall form and style they resembled contemporary minbars in Syria and the Levant, although they lacked the muqarnas at the top of Syrian minbars.

The most accomplished Turkish minbars of this period were made with the kündekâri technique, in which many interlocking pieces of wood were held together without the use of nails, pins, or glue. These pieces were fitted together like a mosaic and supported by an internal wooden frame. Examples of such minbars include the minbar of the Alaeddin Mosque in Konya (dated to 1155–6, before the mosque's many later restorations), the minbars of the congregational mosques (Ulu Camis) of Malatya and Siirt (both from the 13th century and both now housed at the Ethnography Museum of Ankara), the minbar of the Great Mosque of Sivrihisar (1275), and the minbar of the Eşrefoğlu Mosque (1297–9). This style of minbar continued to be used in Anatolian mosques during the Beyliks period and up to the early Ottoman period. In this later period the carvings became shallower, the geometric mosaic arrangement of wooden pieces became more intricate, and projecting bosses were sometimes added to the decoration. Examples of this later period include the minbar of the Saruhanid Great Mosque of Manisa (1376) and the minbar of the Ottoman Great Mosque of Bursa (1499).

As the kündekâri method required great skill and labour, some minbars were made with simpler wooden boards which were carved with decoration made to imitate the kündekâri style and then mounted on a frame. The disadvantage of this method was that over time the wooden boards could warp and shrink, resulting in the motifs being interrupted or misaligned from one board to another. Examples of such minbars include the minbar of the Great Mosque of Divriği (1228–9) and the minbar of the Arslanhane Mosque at Ankara (1289–90). The simpler technique notwithstanding, they are still considered fine examples of Seljuk Anatolian woodwork and craftsmanship.

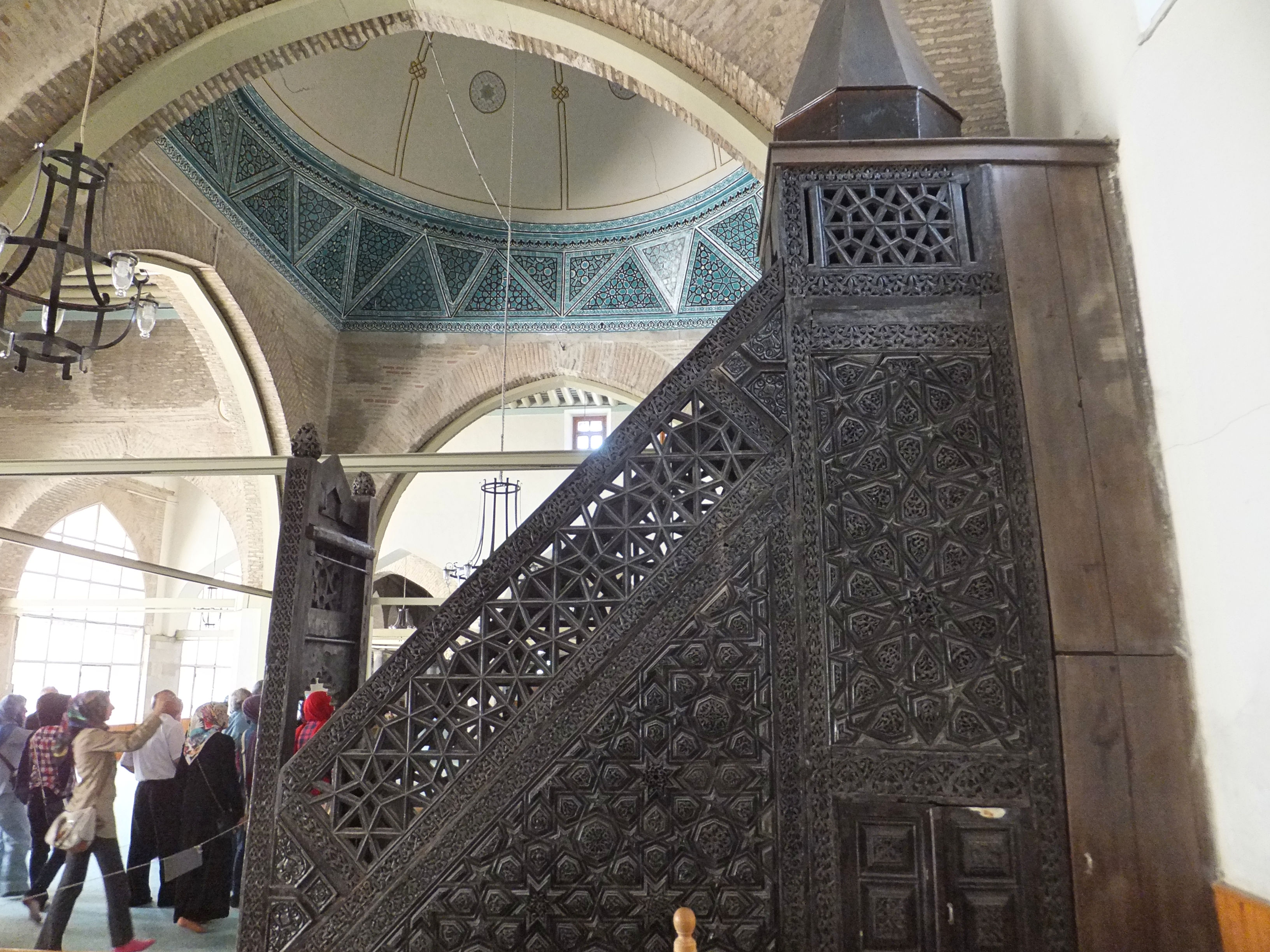
Minbar of the Alaeddin Mosque, Konya (1155–56)

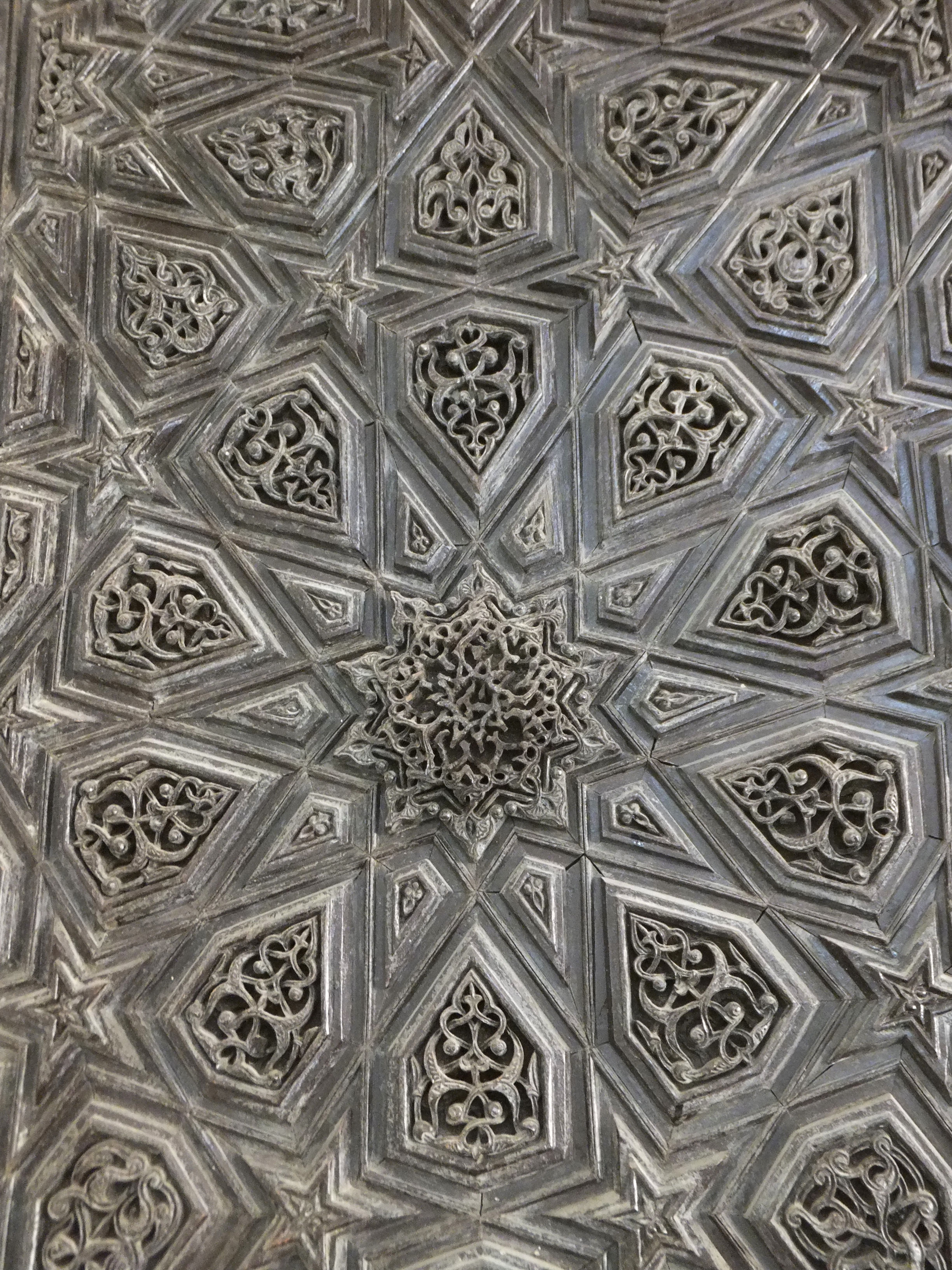
Details of the kündekâri work on the Alaeddin Mosque's minbar

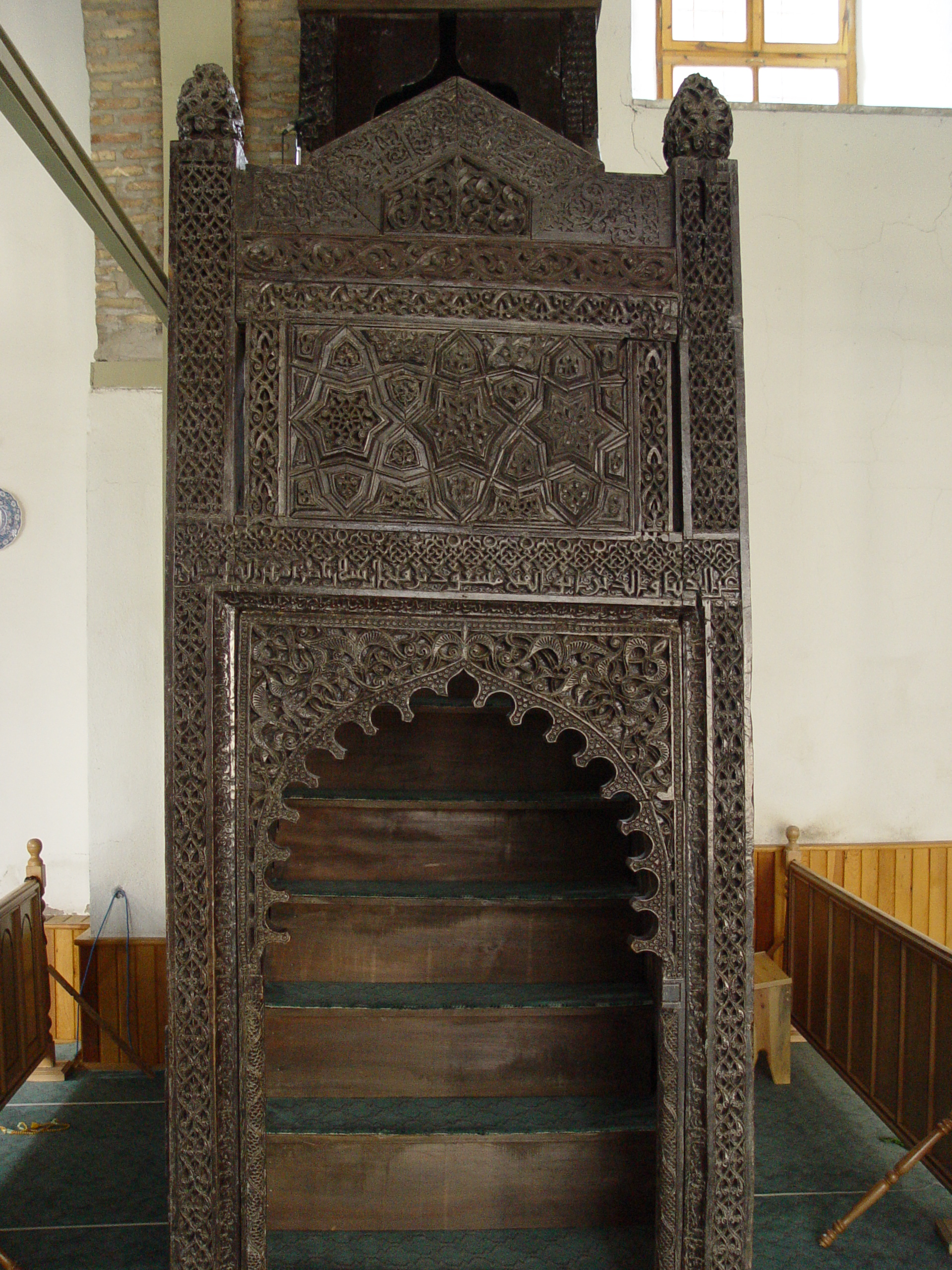
Front part of the Alaeddin Mosque's minbar

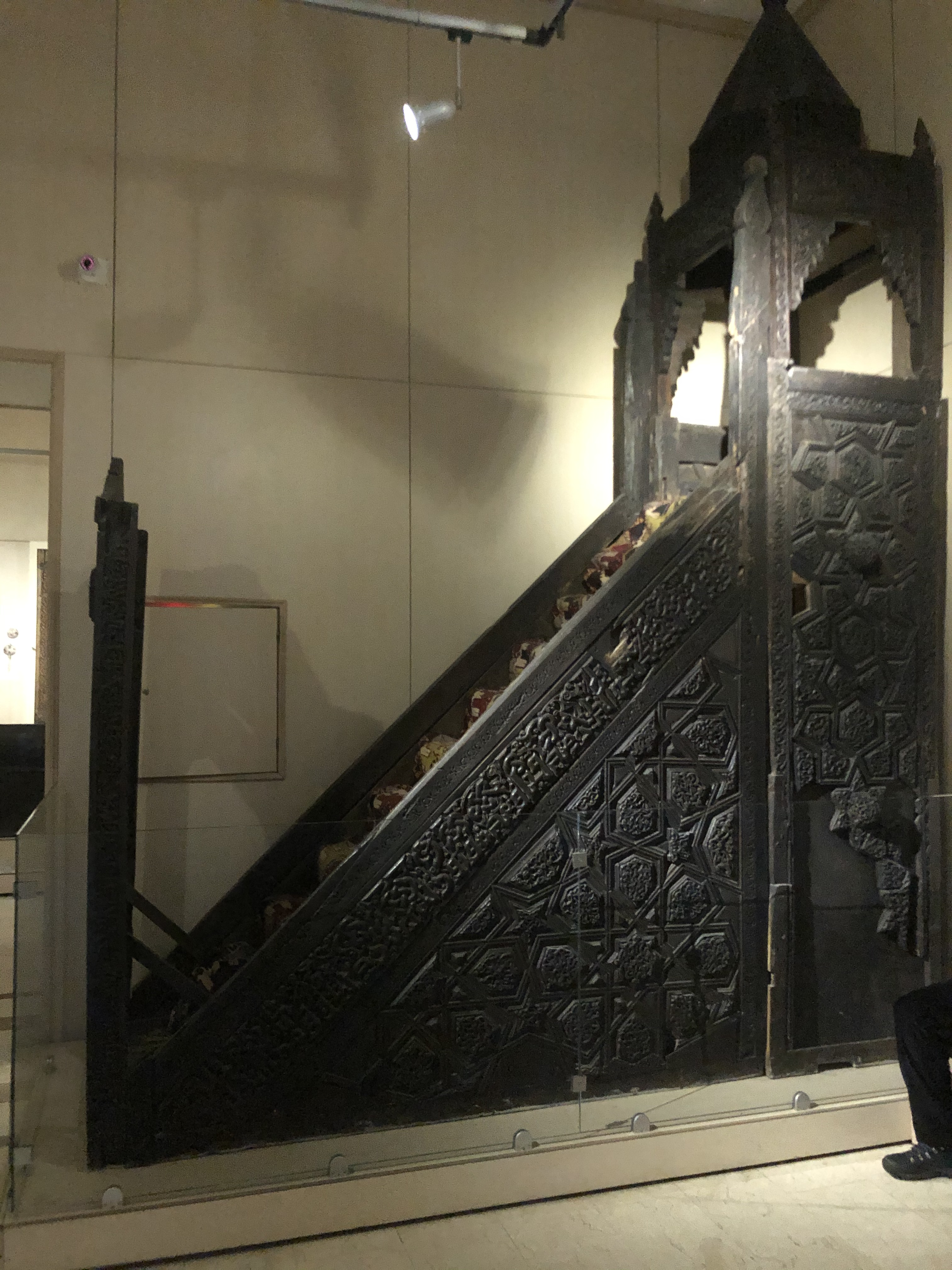
Minbar of the Ulu Cami of Siirt (13th century), now housed in the Ethnography Museum of Ankara

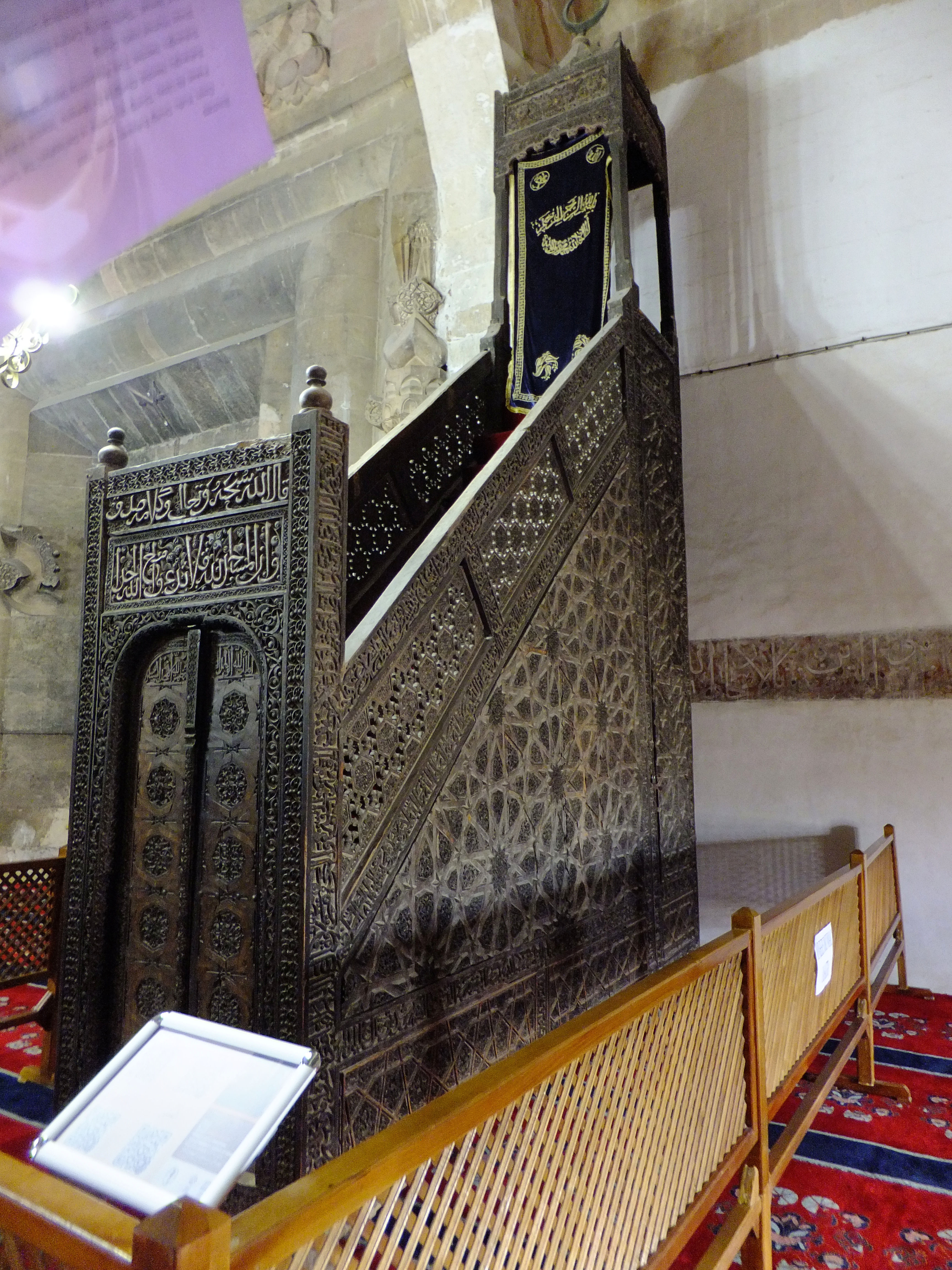
Minbar of the Great Mosque of Divriği (1228–29)

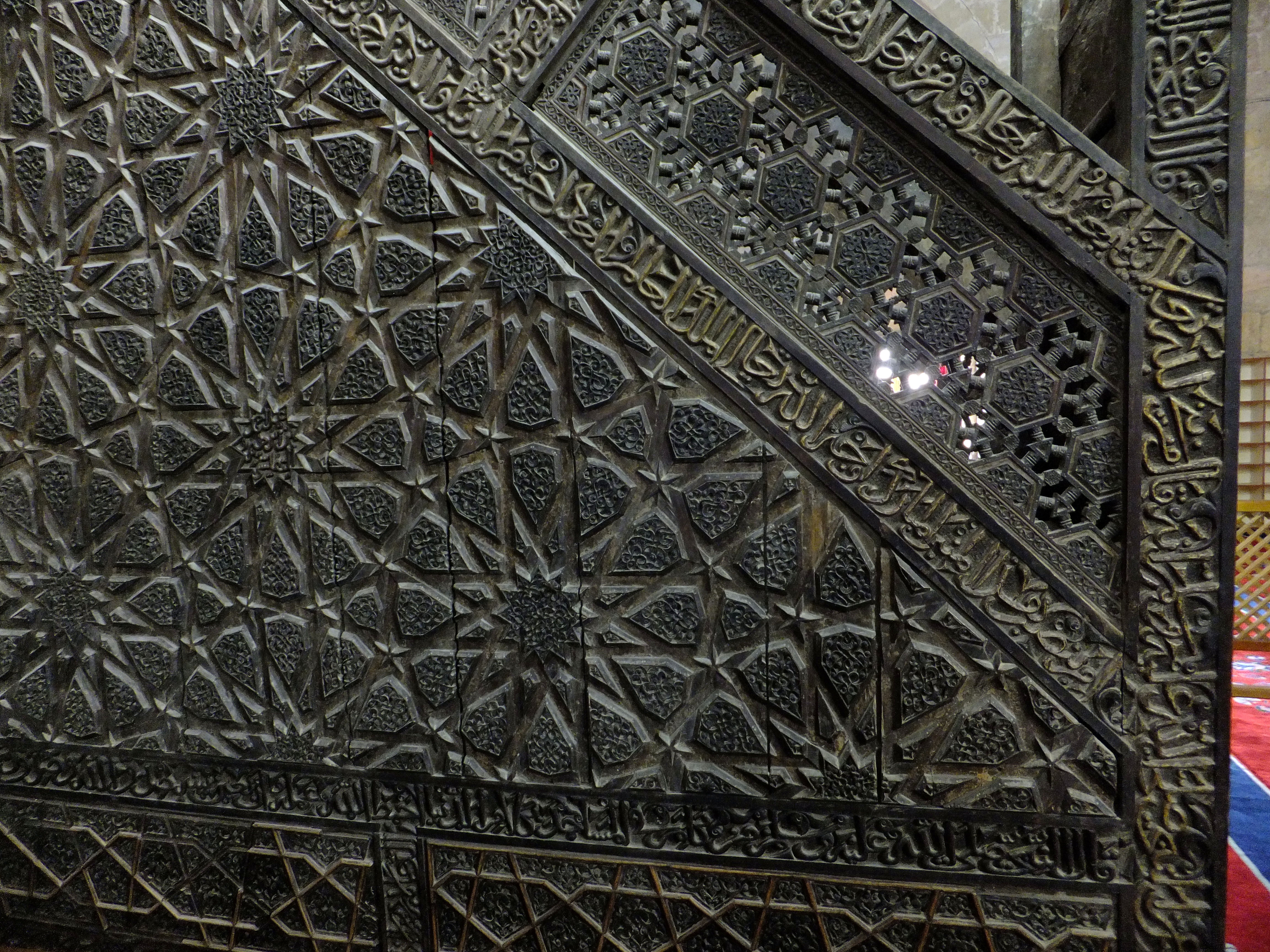
Detail of the Divriği minbar: the lines between the wooden boards mounted side-by-side are visible, while the surface itself is carved with motifs imitating kündekâri work.

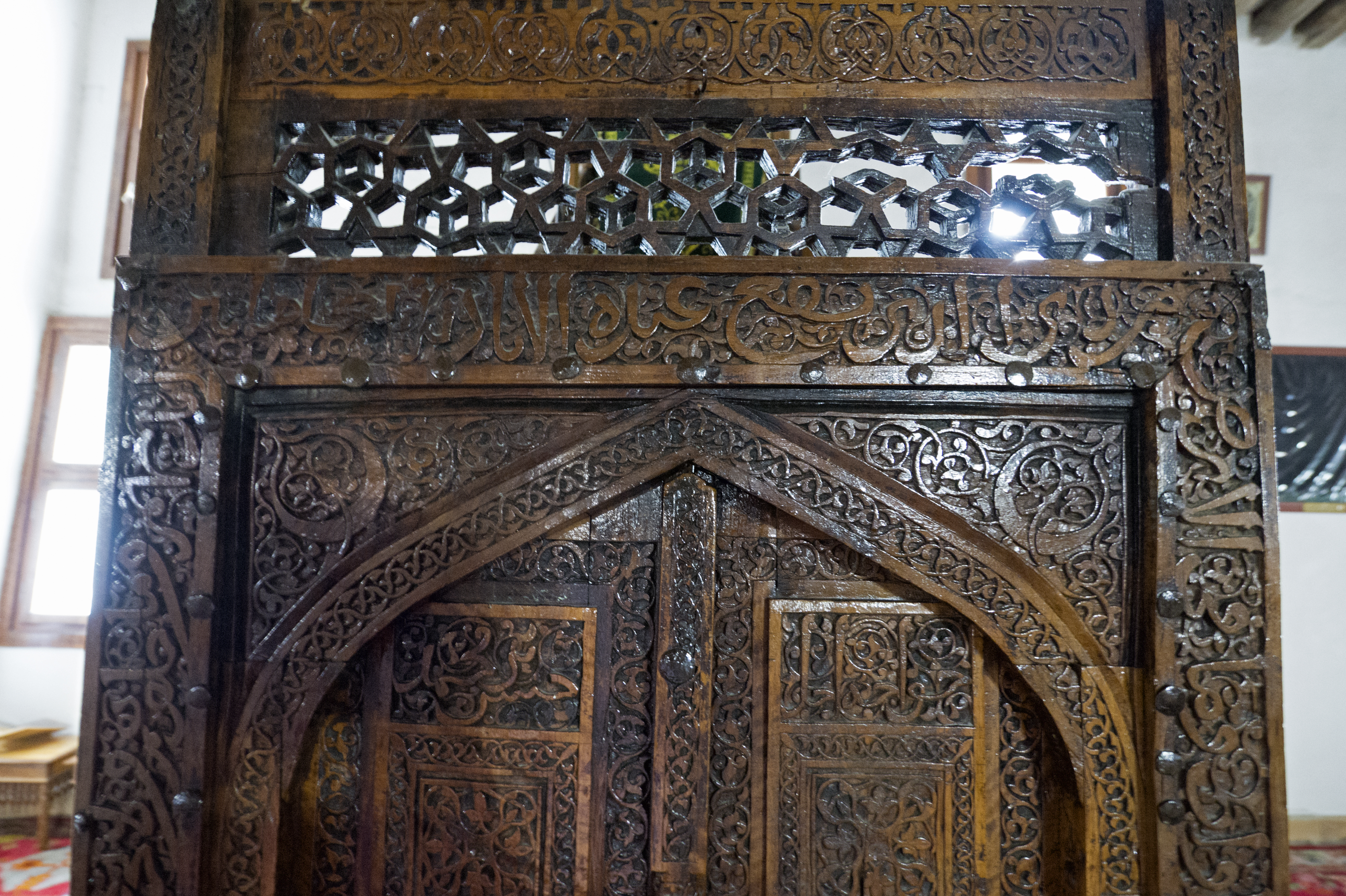
Detail from the front of the minbar of the Great Mosque of Sivrihisar (1275)

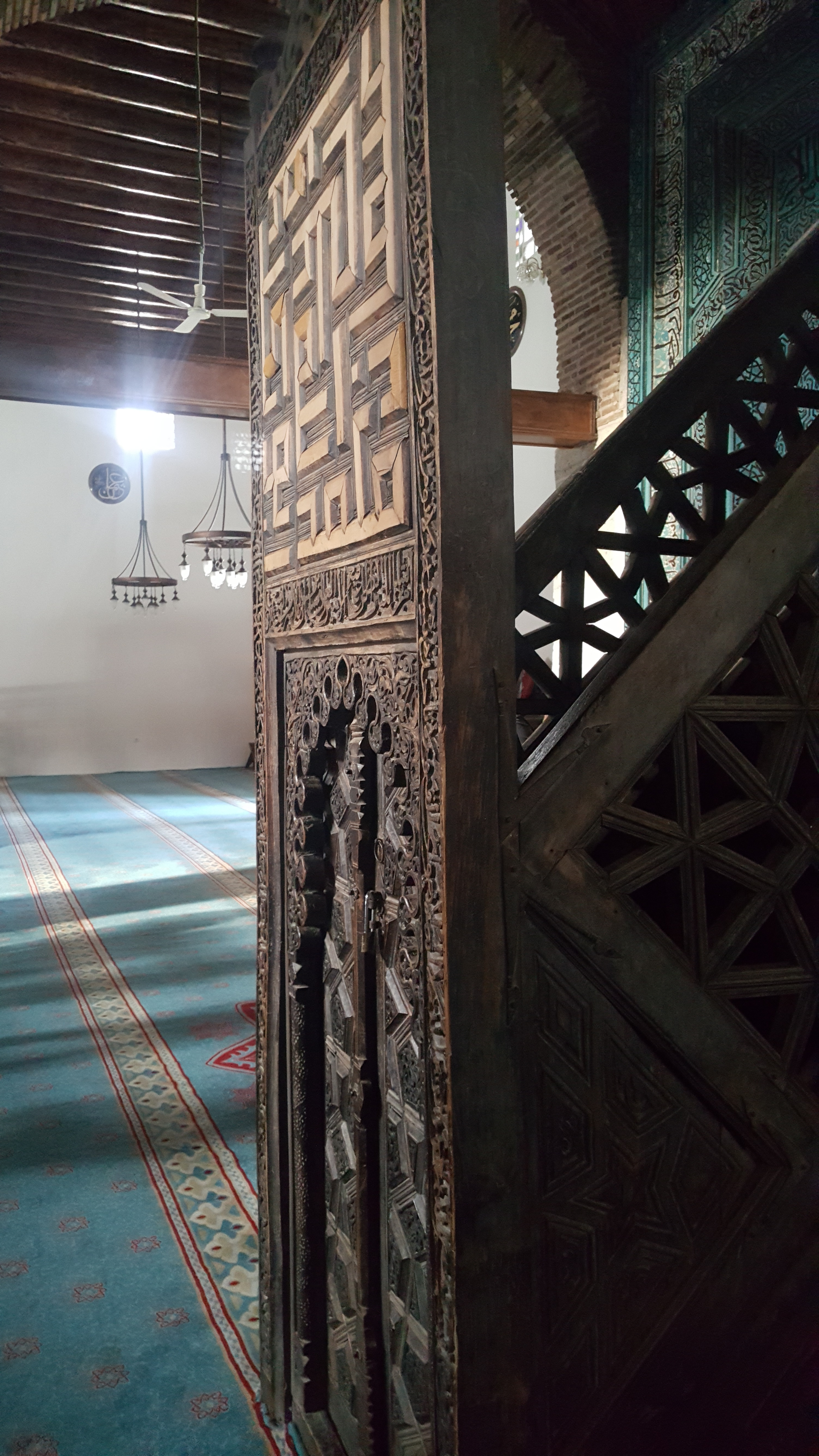
Front part of the minbar of the Eşrefoğlu Mosque, Beyşehir (1297–9)

== See also ==
- List of Seljuk hans and kervansarays in Turkey
- Turkish art

== Bibliography ==
- Bedrosian, Robert (1999). "Armenia during the Seljuk and Mongol Periods". In Hovannisian, Richard (ed.). The Armenian People From Ancient to Modern Times: The Dynastic Periods from Antiquity to the Fourteenth Century. Vol. I. St. Martin's Press.
- Blair, Sheila; Bloom, Jonathan M. (1995). The Art and Architecture of Islam 1250–1800. Yale University Press. ISBN 978-0-300-06465-0.
- Blair, Sheila; Bloom, Jonathan (2004). "West Asia: 1000–1500". In Onians, John (ed.). Atlas of World Art. Laurence King Publishing.
- Blessing, Patricia (2014). Rebuilding Anatolia after the Mongol Conquest: Islamic Architecture in the Lands of Rūm, 1240–1330. Routledge. ISBN 978-1-4724-2406-8.
- Bloom, Jonathan M.; Blair, Sheila (2009). The Grove Encyclopedia of Islamic Art & Architecture. Oxford University Press. ISBN 978-0-19-530991-1.
- Canby, Sheila R.; Beyazit, Deniz; Rugiadi, Martina; Peacock, A. C. S. (2016). Court and Cosmos: The Great Age of the Seljuqs. Metropolitan Museum of Art. ISBN 978-1-58839-589-4.
- Crane, H. (1993). "Notes on Saldjūq Architectural Patronage in Thirteenth Century Anatolia". Journal of the Economic and Social History of the Orient. 36 (1): 1–57. doi:10.1163/156852093X00010.
- Ettinghausen, Richard; Grabar, Oleg; Jenkins-Madina, Marilyn (2001). Islamic Art and Architecture: 650–1250. Yale University Press. ISBN 978-0-300-08869-4.
- Flood, Finbarr Barry (2007). "Lost in Translation: Architecture, Taxonomy, and the Eastern "Turks"". Muqarnas. 24: 79–115. doi:10.1163/22118993-90000112.
- Hattstein, Markus; Delius, Peter, eds. (2011). Islam: Art and Architecture. h.f.ullmann. ISBN 9783848003808.
- Kuban, Doğan (2001). The Miracle of Divriği. YKY. ISBN 975080290X.
- Pancaroğlu, Oya (2013). "Devotion, Hospitality and Architecture in Medieval Anatolia". Studia Islamica. 108: 48–81. doi:10.1163/19585705-12341275.
- Petersen, Andrew (1996). Dictionary of Islamic Architecture. Routledge. ISBN 9781134613663.
- Saladin, H. (1908). "Architecture (Muhammadan)". In Hastings, James; Alexander, John (eds.). Encyclopaedia of Religion and Ethics. Vol. 1. Charles Scribner's son.
- Saoud, Rabah (2003). Al-Hassani, Salim (ed.). "Muslim Architecture Under Seljuk Patronage (1038–1327)" (PDF). Foundation for Science Technology and Civilisation.
