= Wooden Hypostyle Mosques of Medieval Anatolia =

UNESCO World Heritage Site
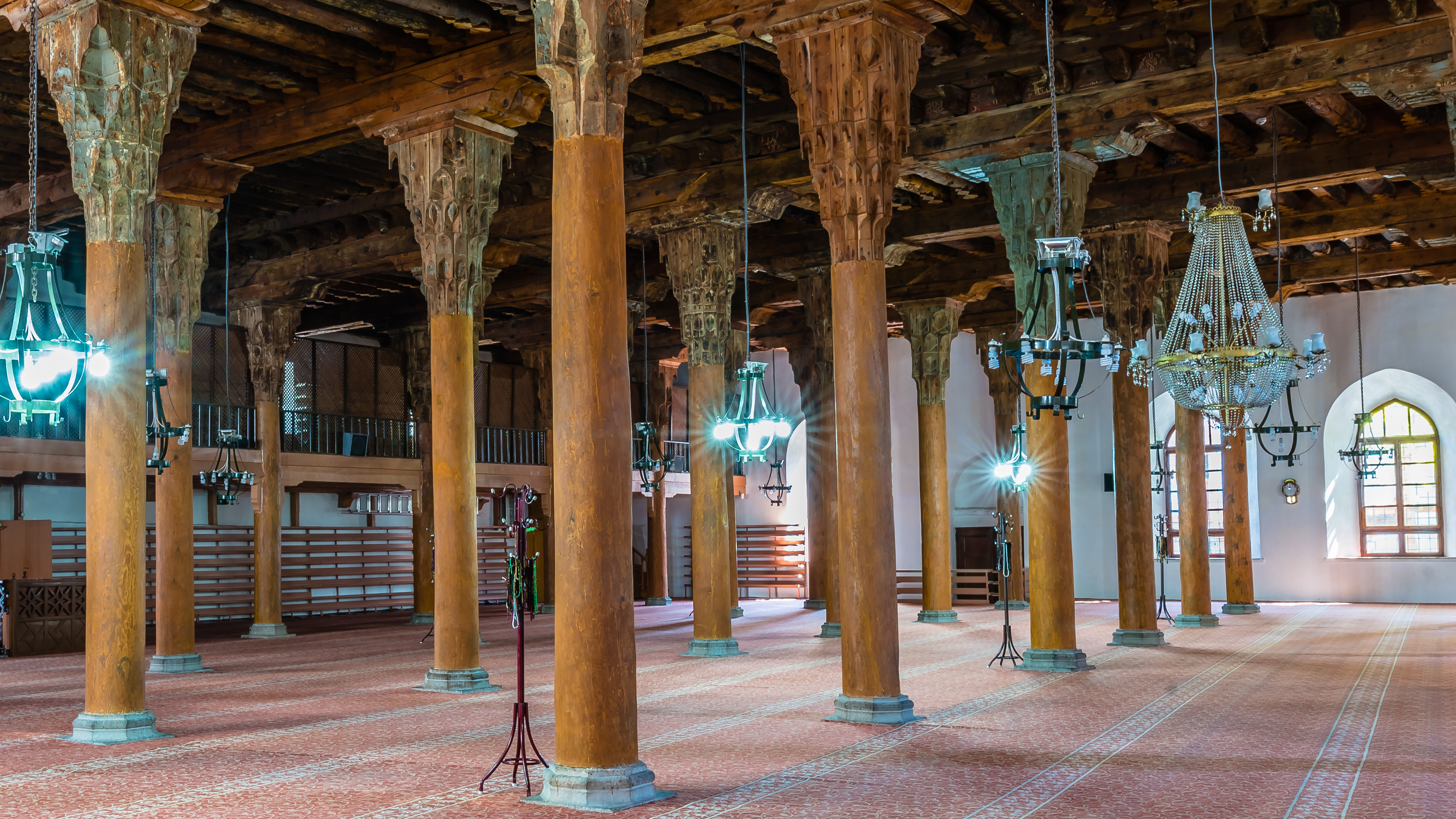
- Interior of Afyon Grand Mosque

- Location within Turkey Location within Europe
- Location: Turkey
- Includes: Afyon Grand Mosque; Aslanhane Mosque; Eşrefoğlu Mosque; Mahmut Bey Mosque; Sivrihisar Grand Mosque
- Criteria: Cultural: (ii), (iv)
- Reference: 1694
- Inscription: 2023 (45th Session)
- Area: 0.61 ha (1.5 acres)
- Buffer zone: 36.66 ha (90.6 acres)

The Wooden Hypostyle Mosques of Medieval Anatolia (Turkish: Anadolu'nun Orta Çağ Dönemi Ahşap Hipostil Camileri) are a World Heritage Site consisting of five Seljuk mosques in Anatolia dating back to the late 13th and mid-14th centuries.

Afyon Grand Mosque, Aslanhane Mosque, Eşrefoğlu Mosque, Mahmut Bey Mosque, and Sivrihisar Grand Mosque were included in the tentative list of World Heritage Sites in 2018 under the name "Wooden Roofed and Wooden Columned Mosques in Anatolia". In 2023, the site became a World Heritage Site when UNESCO recognized the mosques for their outstanding universal values.

== Components ==
World Heritage Sites
Site	Image	Location (province)	UNESCO ID	Description
Afyon Grand Mosque		Afyonkarahisar Province	1694-001	
Aslanhane Mosque		Ankara Province	1694-002	
Eşrefoğlu Mosque		Konya Province	1694-005	
Mahmut Bey Mosque		Kastamonu Province	1694-004	
Sivrihisar Grand Mosque		Eskişehir Province	1694-003	
