= Grand Mosque of Sivrihisar =

Mosque in Sivrihisar, Turkey

Sivrihisar Grand Mosque
- Sivrihisar Ulu Camii
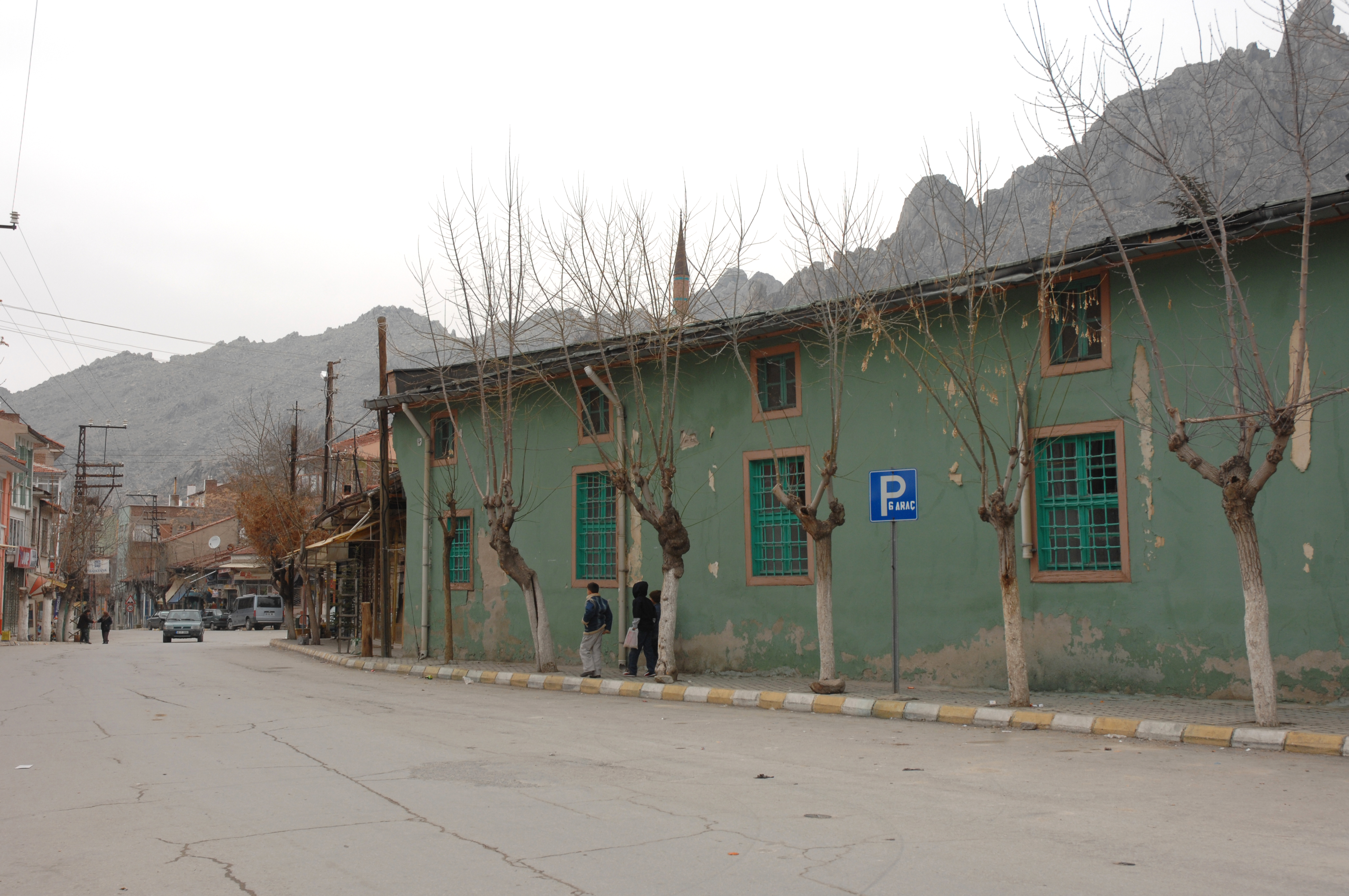

- Location within Turkey

Religion
- Affiliation: Sunni Islam
- District: Sivrihisar
- Province: Eskişehir
- Region: Central Anatolia Region
- Status: active

Location
- Interactive map of Sivrihisar Grand Mosque
- Coordinates: 39°27′03″N 31°32′14″E

Architecture
- Type: Mosque
- Style: Seljuk architecture
- Completed: 1232; 794 years ago

Specifications
- Minaret: 1
- Materials: ashlar, wood
- UNESCO World Heritage Site
- Type: Cultural
- Criteria: ii, iv
- Designated: 2023
- Parent listing: Wooden Hypostyle Mosques of Medieval Anatolia
- Reference no.: 1694-003

Sivrihisar Grand Mosque (Turkish: Sivrihisar Ulu Camii) is a historic mosque in Sivrihisar, Turkey.

The mosque is located in Sivrihisar ilçe (district) of Eskişehir Province. It was built by Leşker Emir Celaleddin Ali in 1231–1232 during the reign of Anatolian Seljuk Sultan Kayqubad I (r. 1220–1237). It later underwent two restorations, in 1275 by Eminüddin Mikail bin Abdullah, the regent of Kaykhusraw III (r. 1265–1284), and in 1440 by Hızır Bey, a judge in Sivrihisar and later the first judge in Istanbul. The mosque is one of only five examples of wooden-columned architectural technique in Anatolia.

The ground area of the mosque is 1,485 m^{2} (15,980 sq ft). It has a rectangular plan. The outer walls are of ashlar. It has four entrances. Marble inscriptions showing the historical restoration dates are found on the northern and eastern gates. The roof is covered by tiles, which were replaced by lead sheet not long ago. The roof is carried by 67 wooden columns, of which upper parts are decorated by, mostly in green, red and black colors, engravings of traditional figures. Some columns stand on stone base having ancient column head. It is likely that the stone columns heads originate from Pessinus, an ancient city known as Ballıhisar today close to Sivrihisar. There are six naves in east-west direction. The middle naves are higher than the others resembling the historic Turkic tents used in the nomadic era in Central Asia. The mosque's minbar, the pulpit, is a masterwork made by Horasanlı İbni Mehmet in 1245, and is famous for its ornaments in geometrical and floral design engraved in walnut wood. It is believed that the minbar was brought here from the Sivrihisar Kılıç Masjid, which was demolished in 1924. The minaret was added by Osman oğlu Hacı Habib in 1409–1410 according to its inscription.

== World Heritage Site status ==
This site was added to the UNESCO World Heritage List on 2023 in the Cultural category.

== Gallery ==
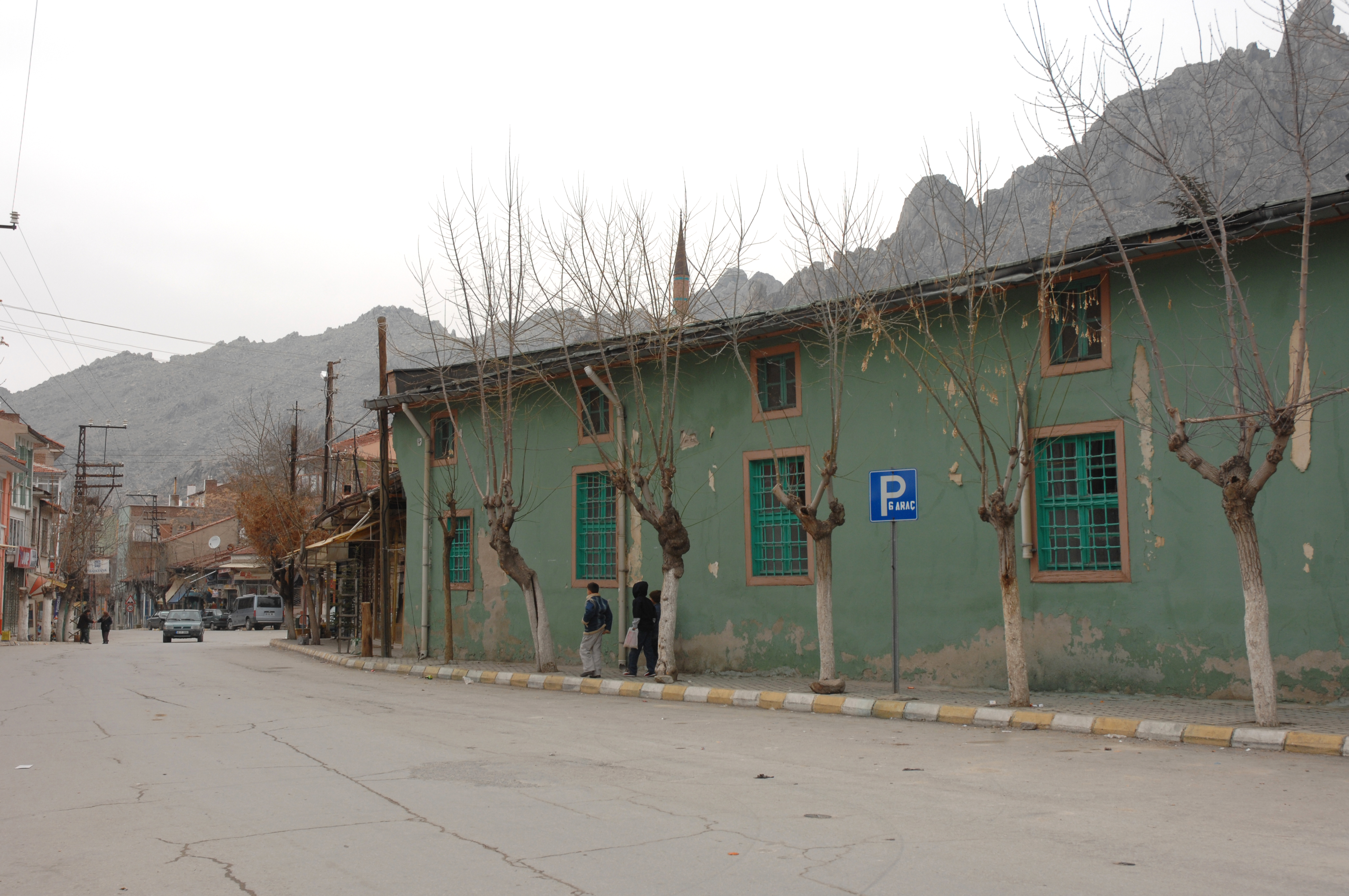
Sivrihisar Grand Mosque Exterior side

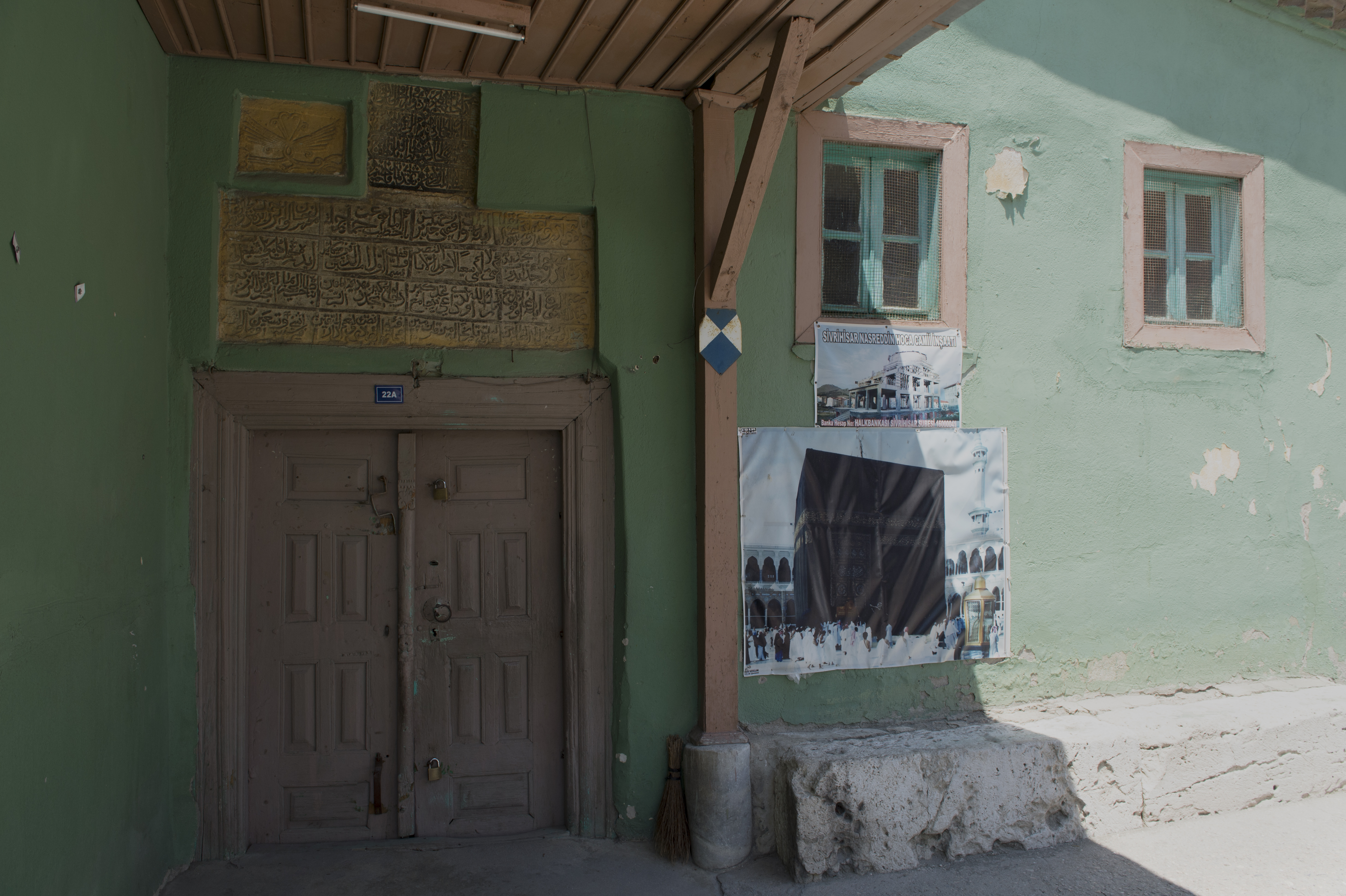
Sivrihisar Grand Mosque entrance

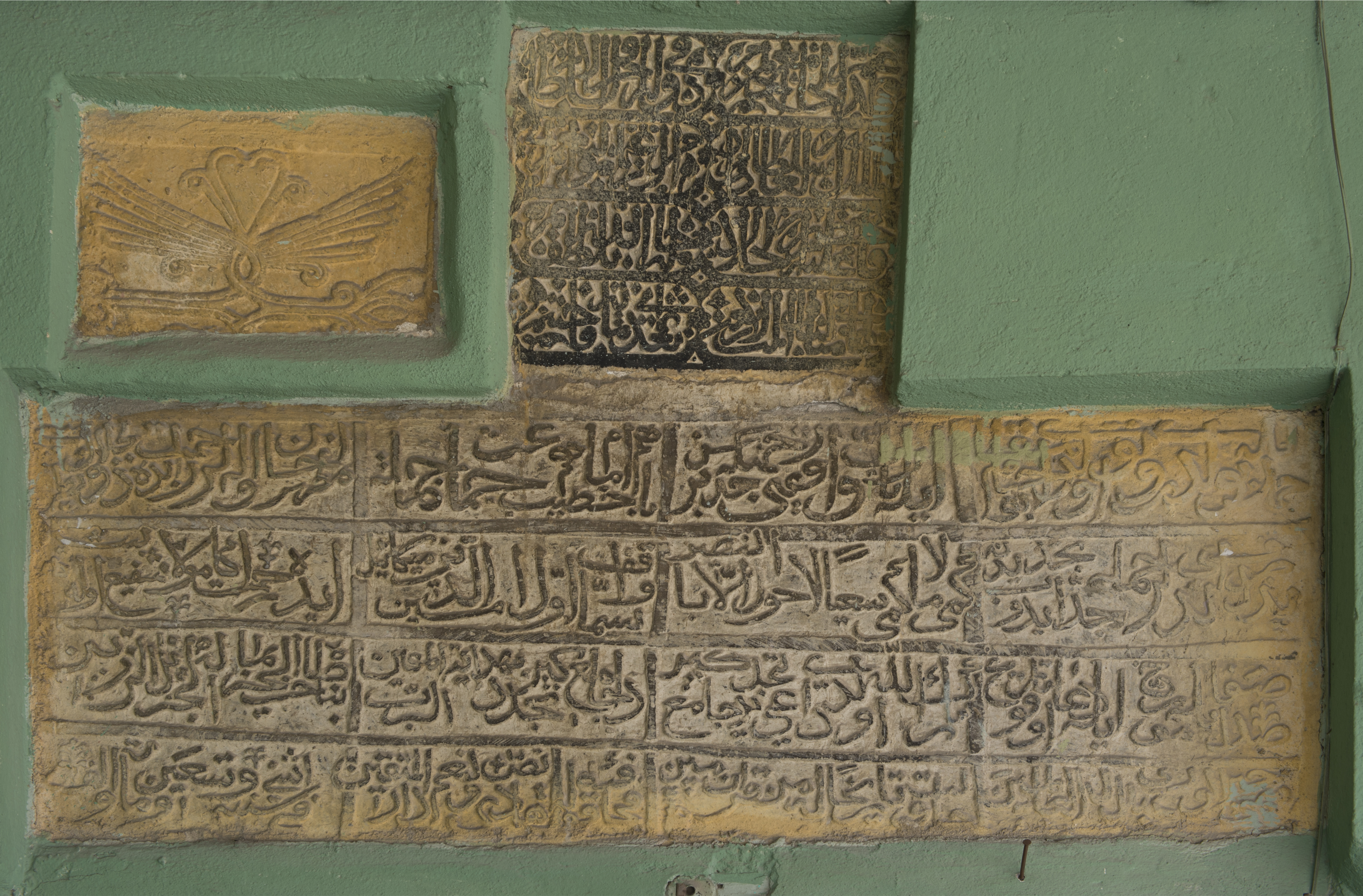
Sivrihisar Grand Mosque Foundation stones

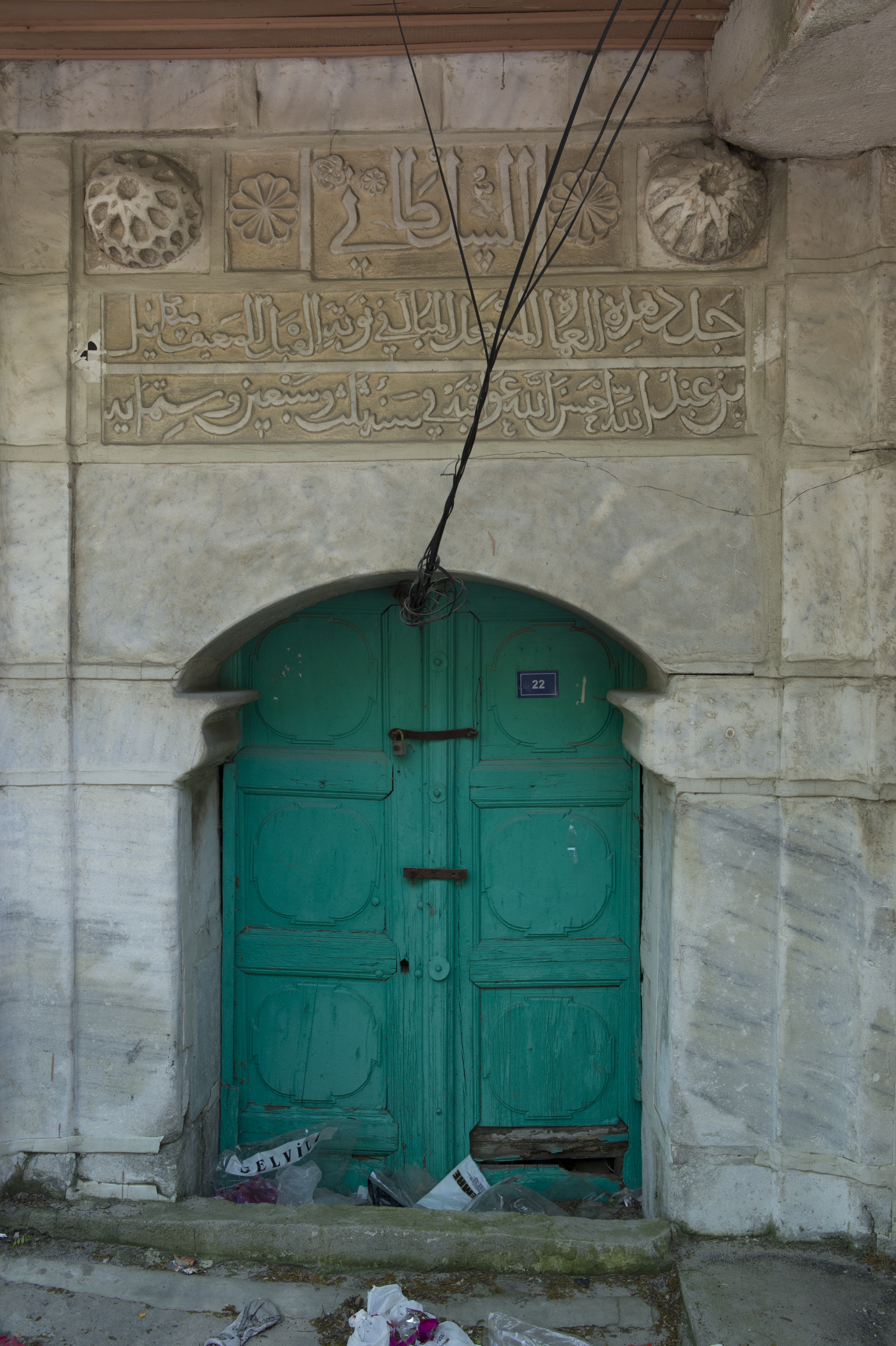
Sivrihisar Grand Mosque entrance

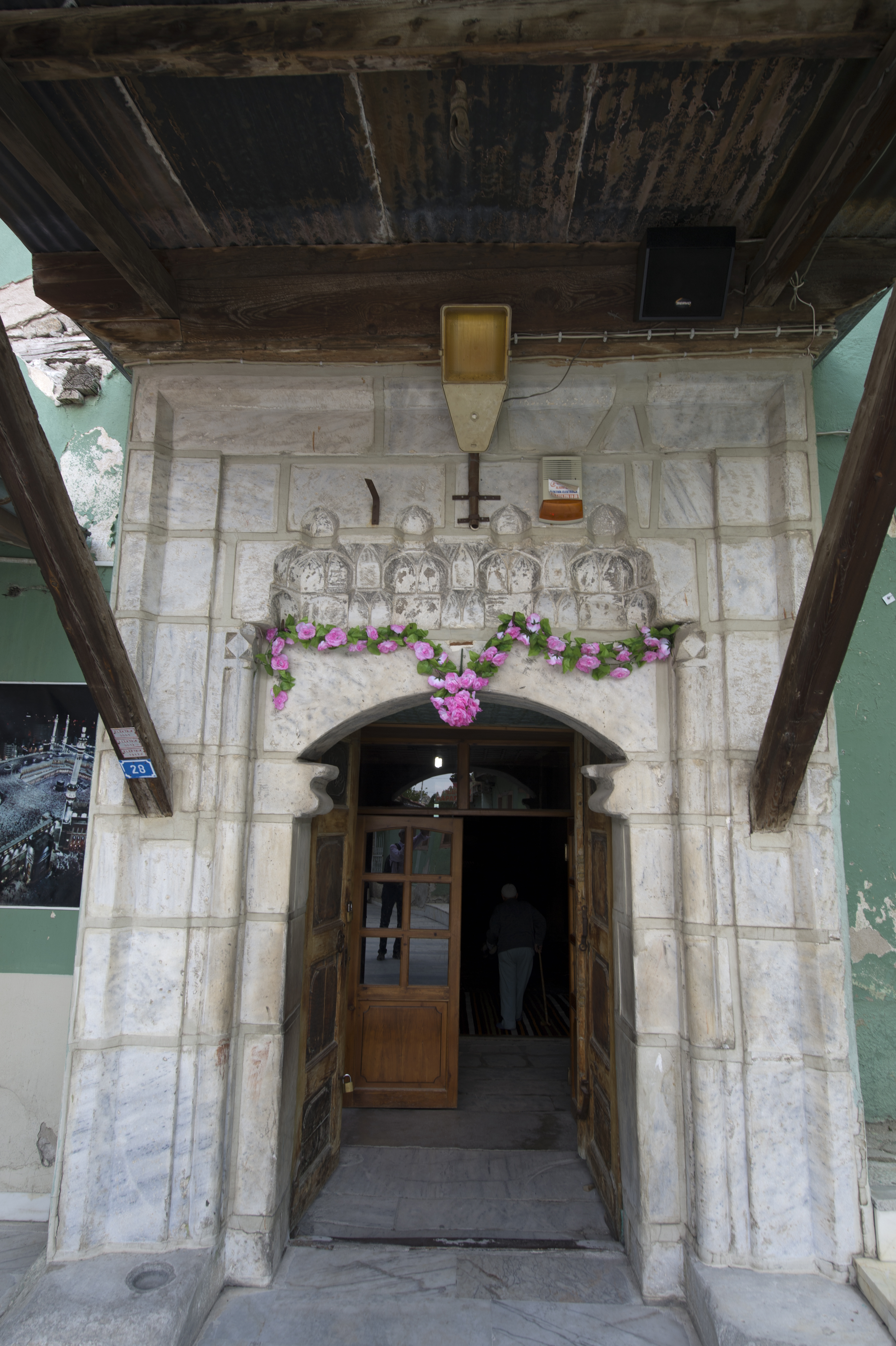
Sivrihisar Grand Mosque entrance

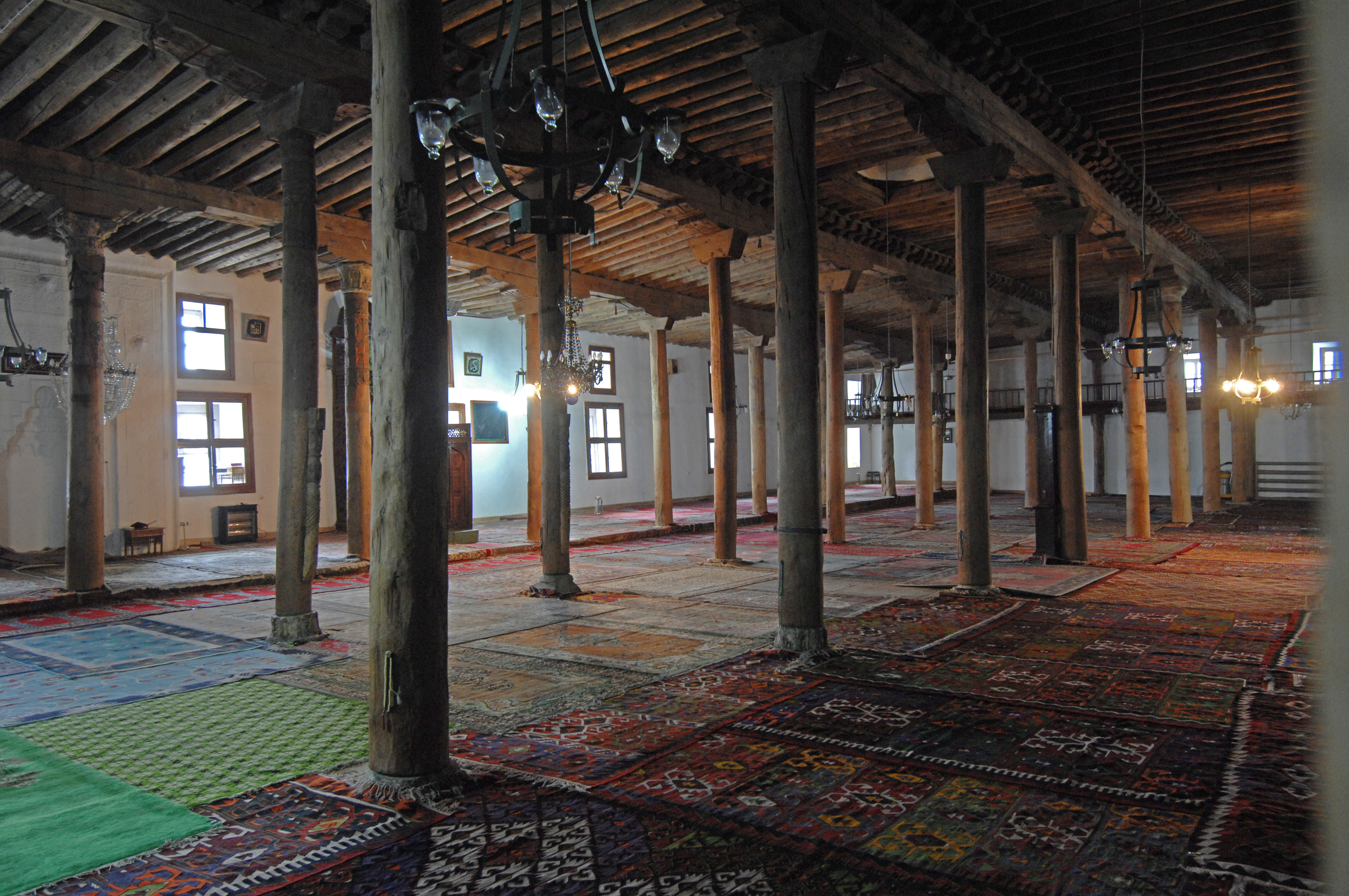
Sivrihisar Grand Mosque Interior general view

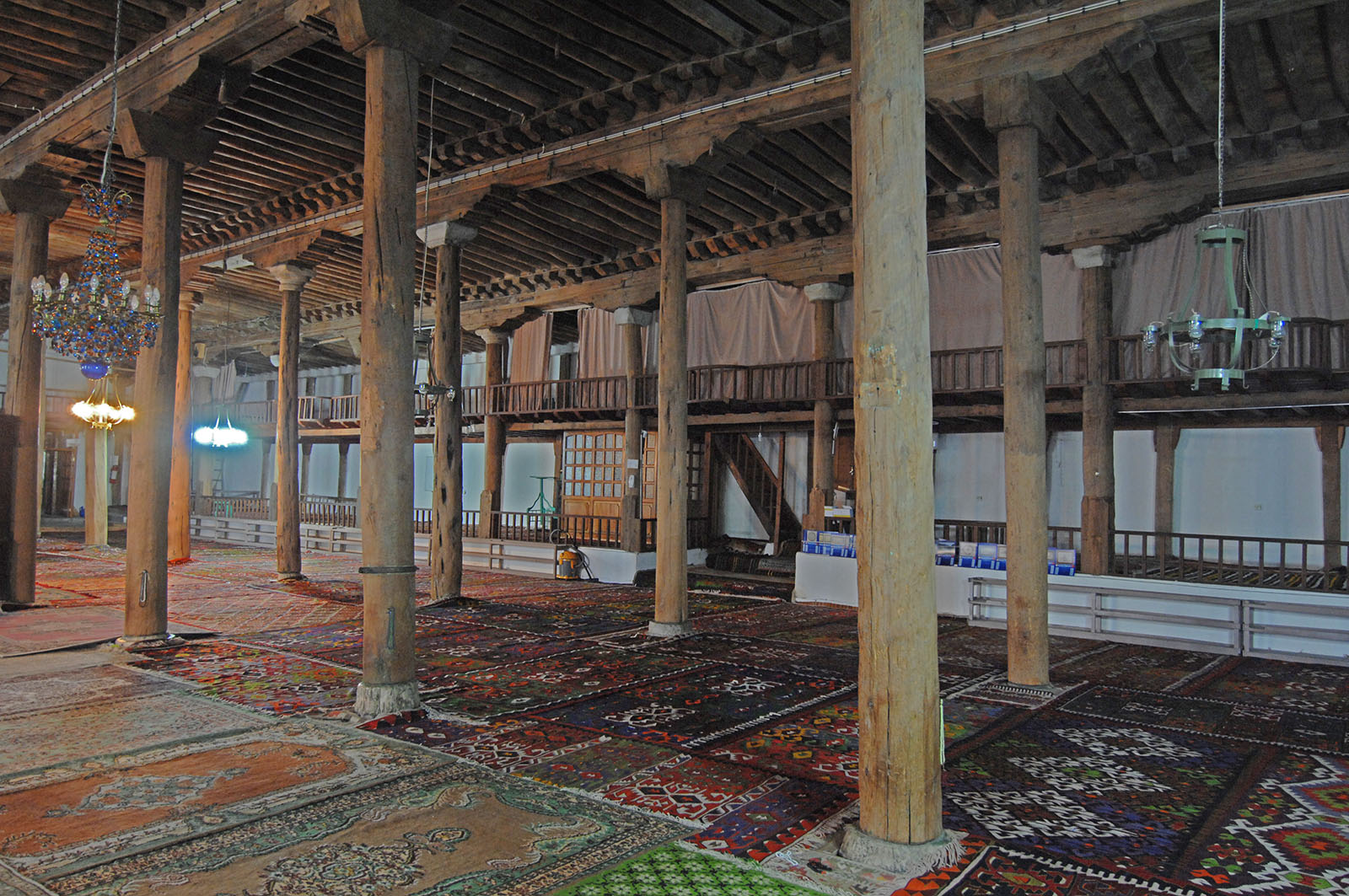
Sivrihisar Grand Mosque Interior general view

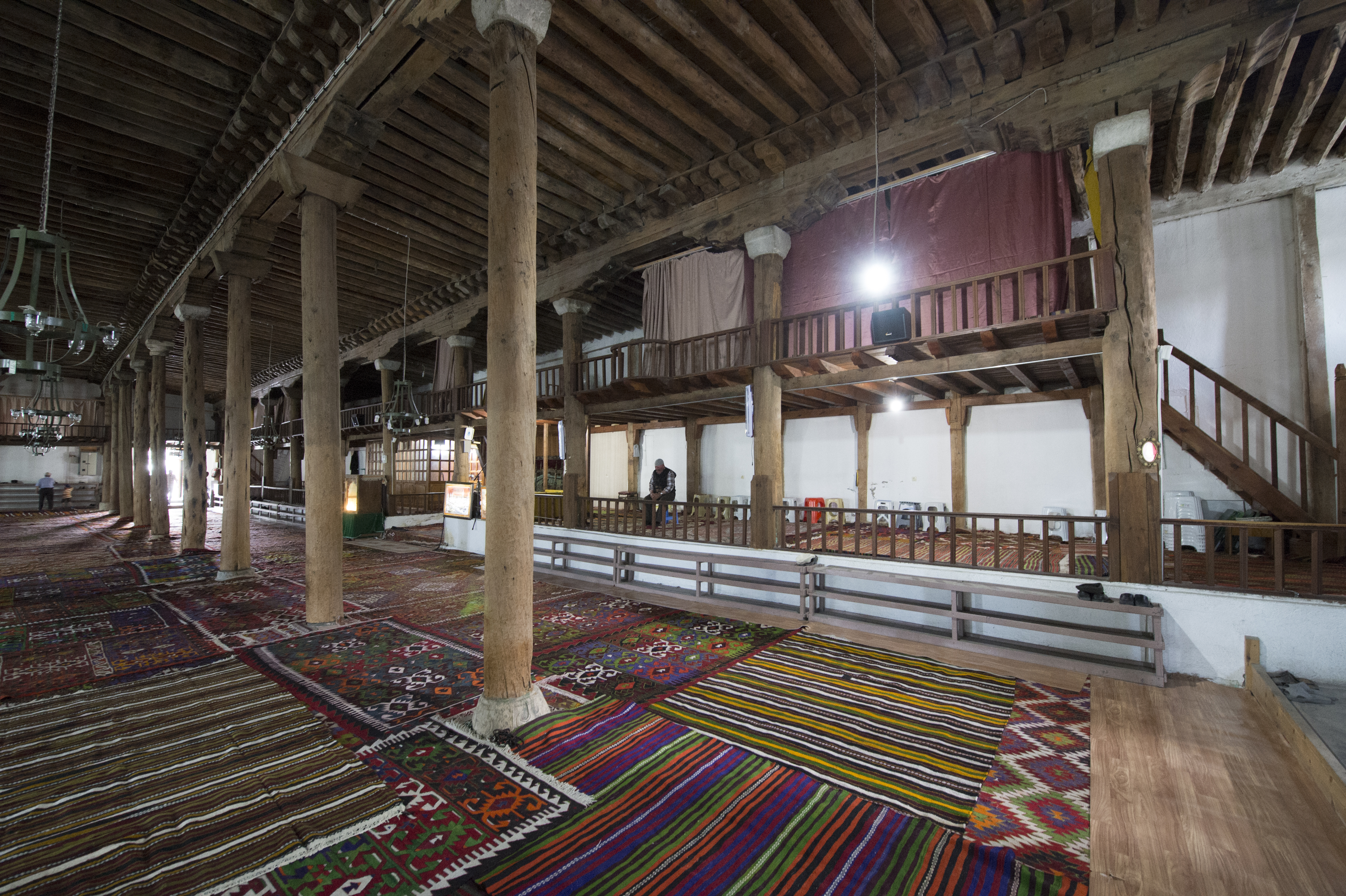
Sivrihisar Grand Mosque Interior

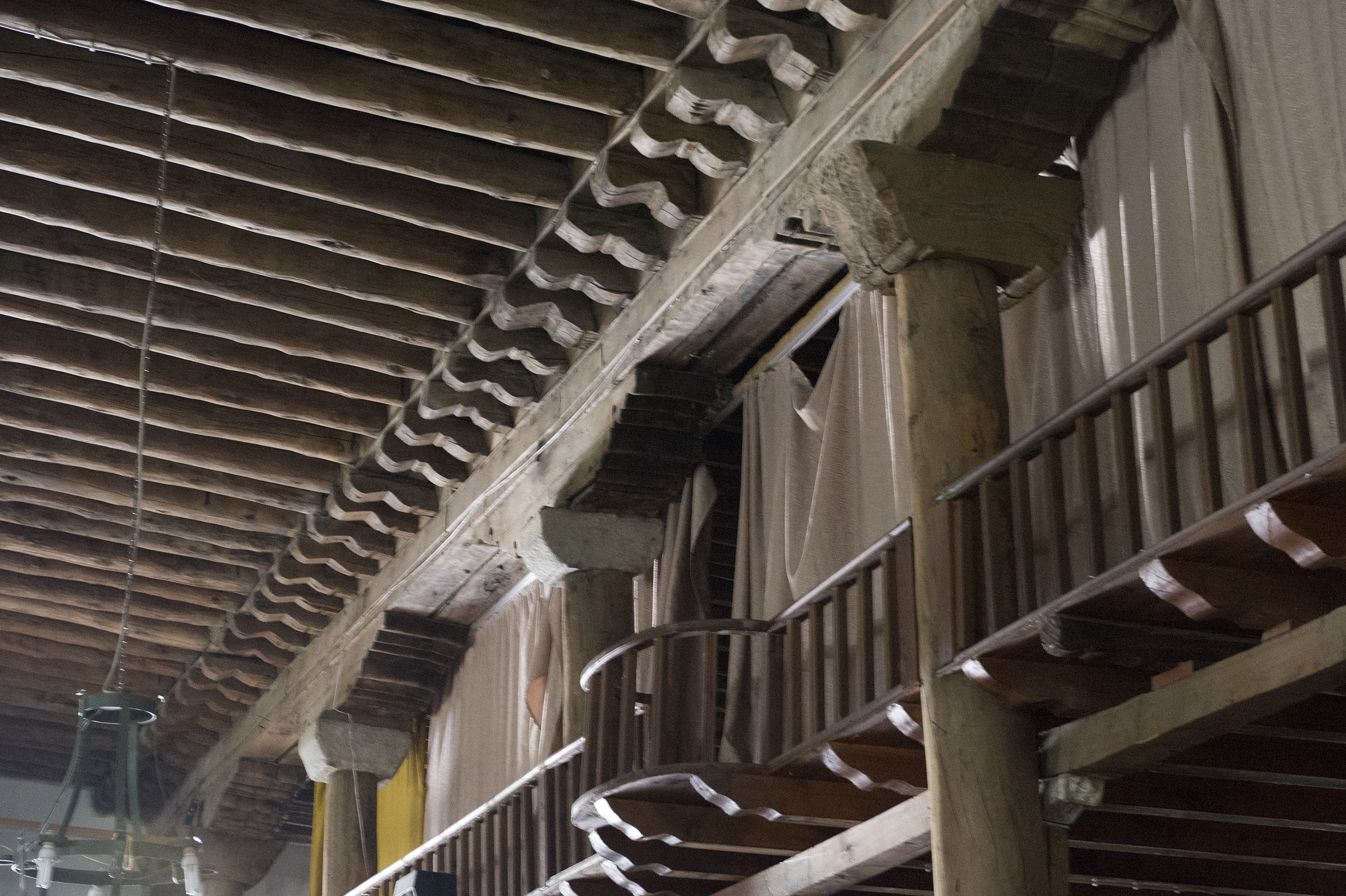
Sivrihisar Grand Mosque Interior with balcony

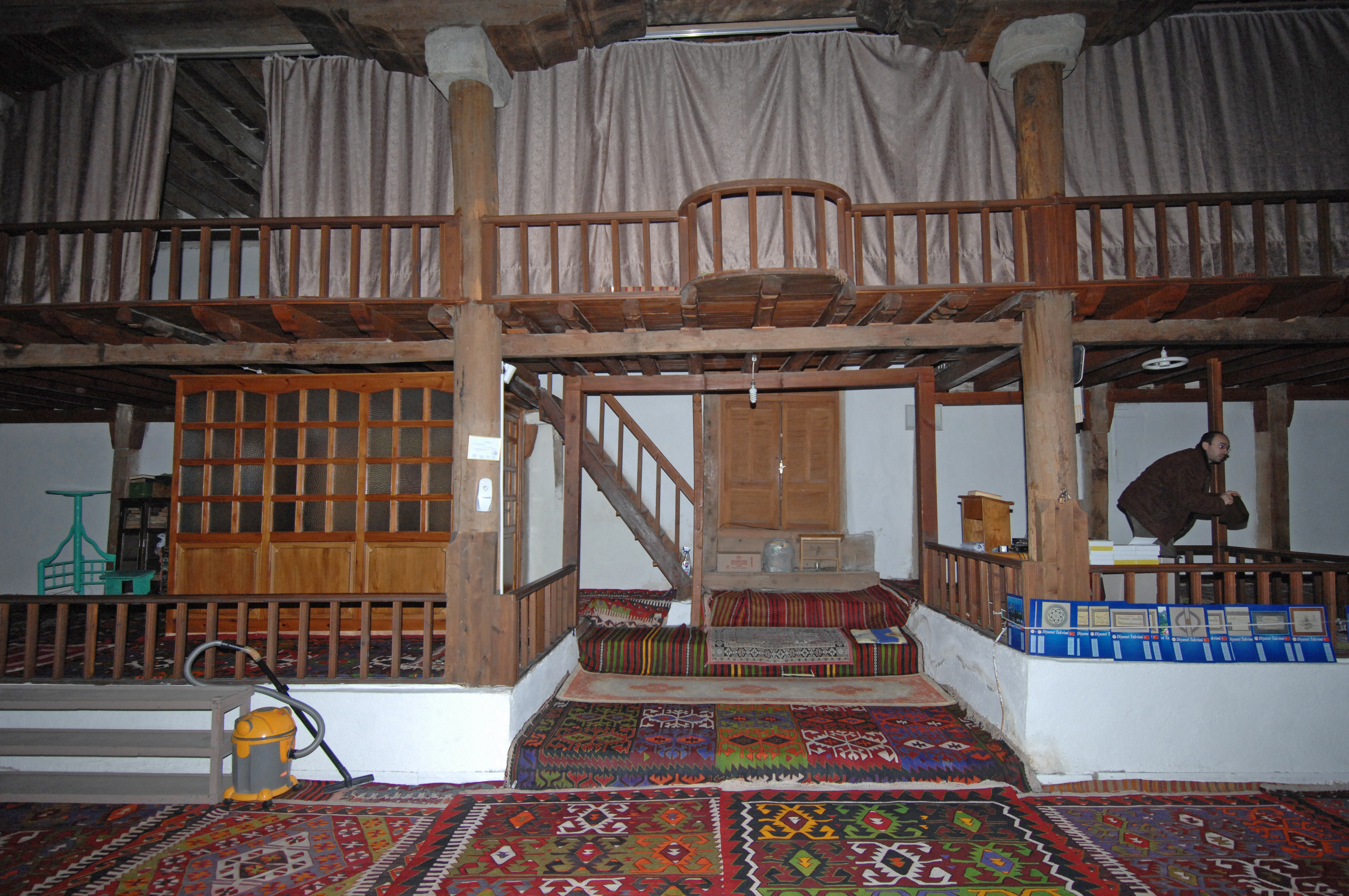
Sivrihisar Grand Mosque Interior

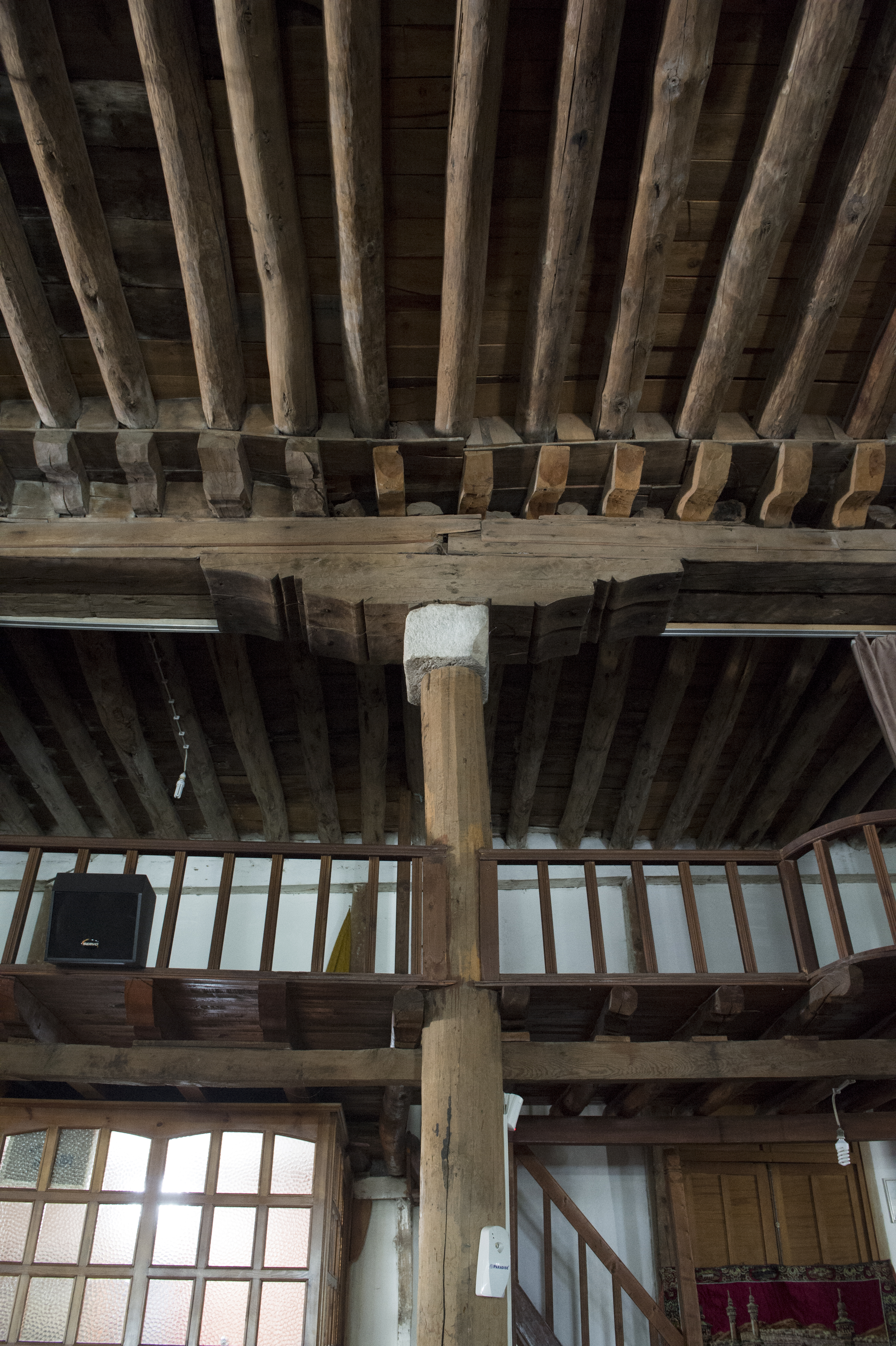
Sivrihisar Grand Mosque Interior roof and balcony

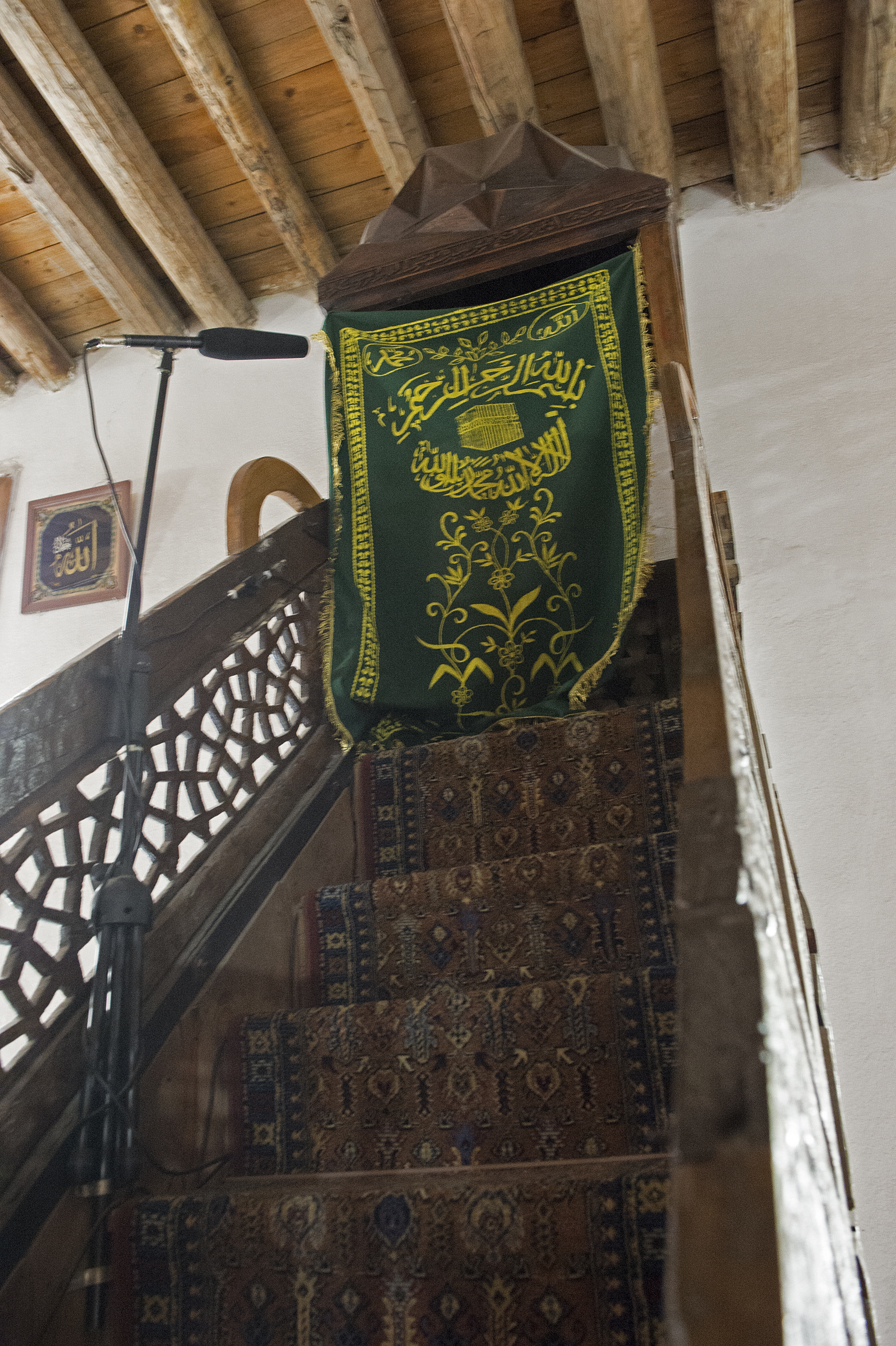
Sivrihisar Grand Mosque Minbers stairs

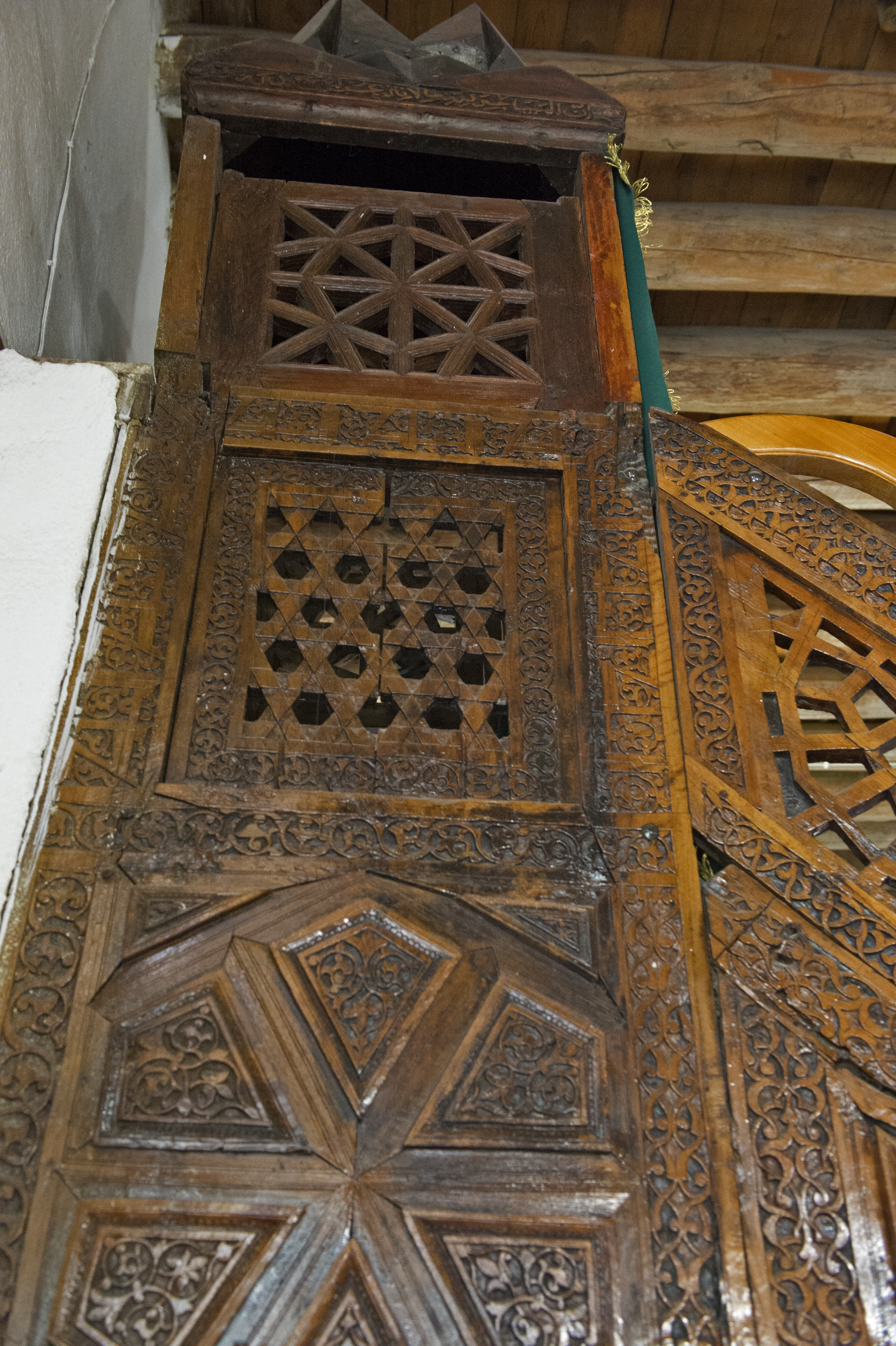
Sivrihisar Grand Mosque Minber side

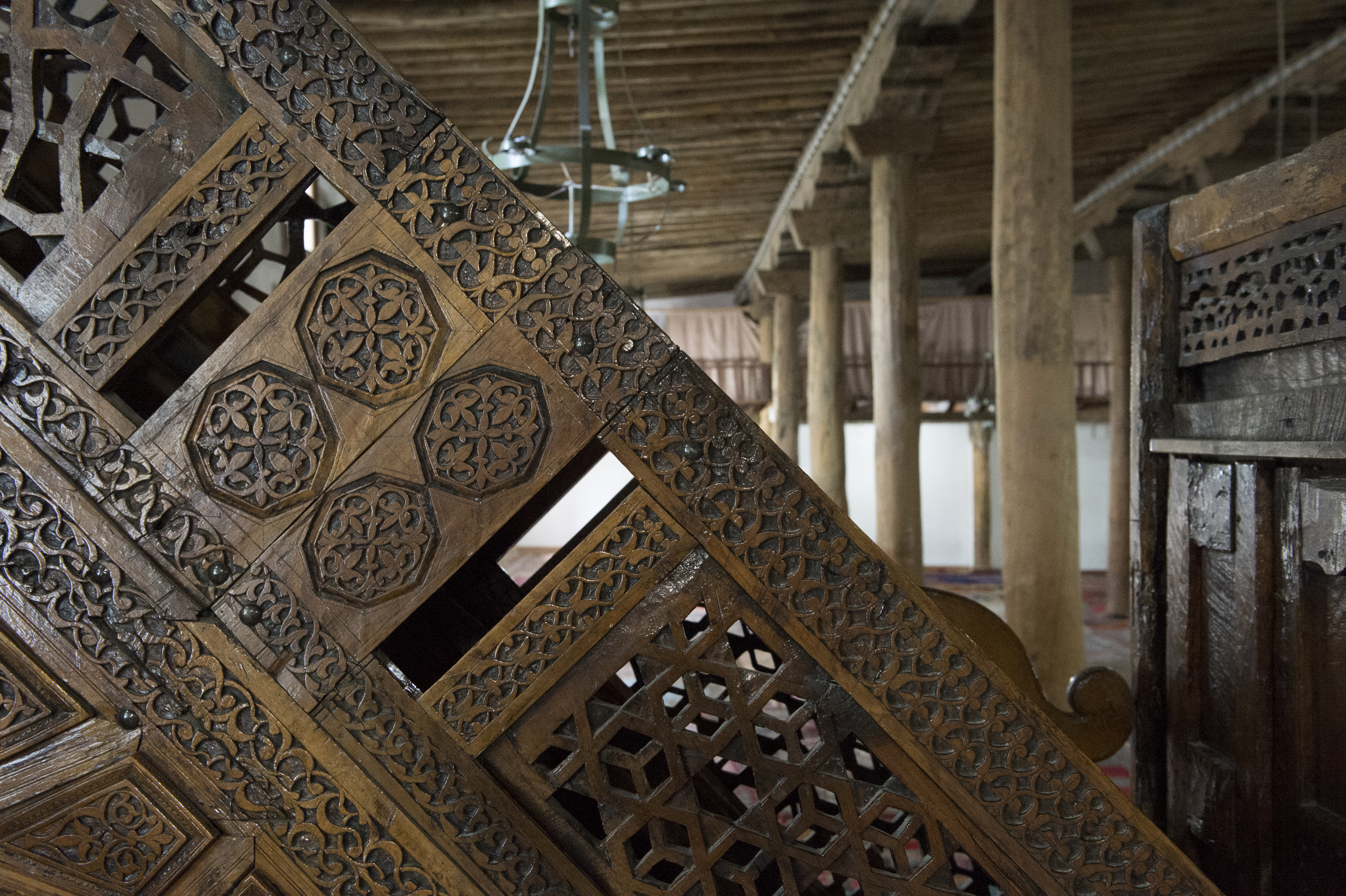
Sivrihisar Grand Mosque Minber side

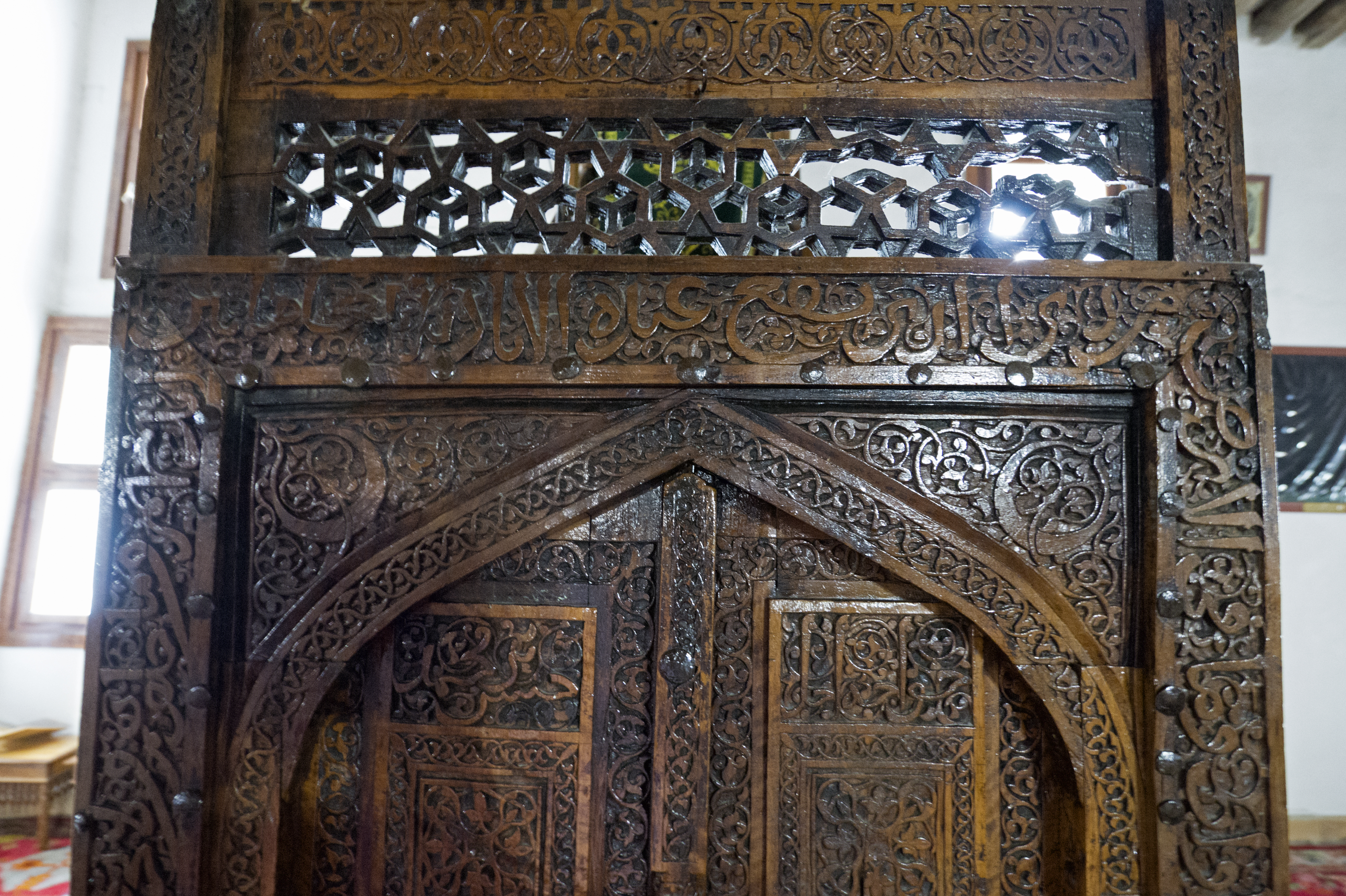
Sivrihisar Grand Mosque Minber detail

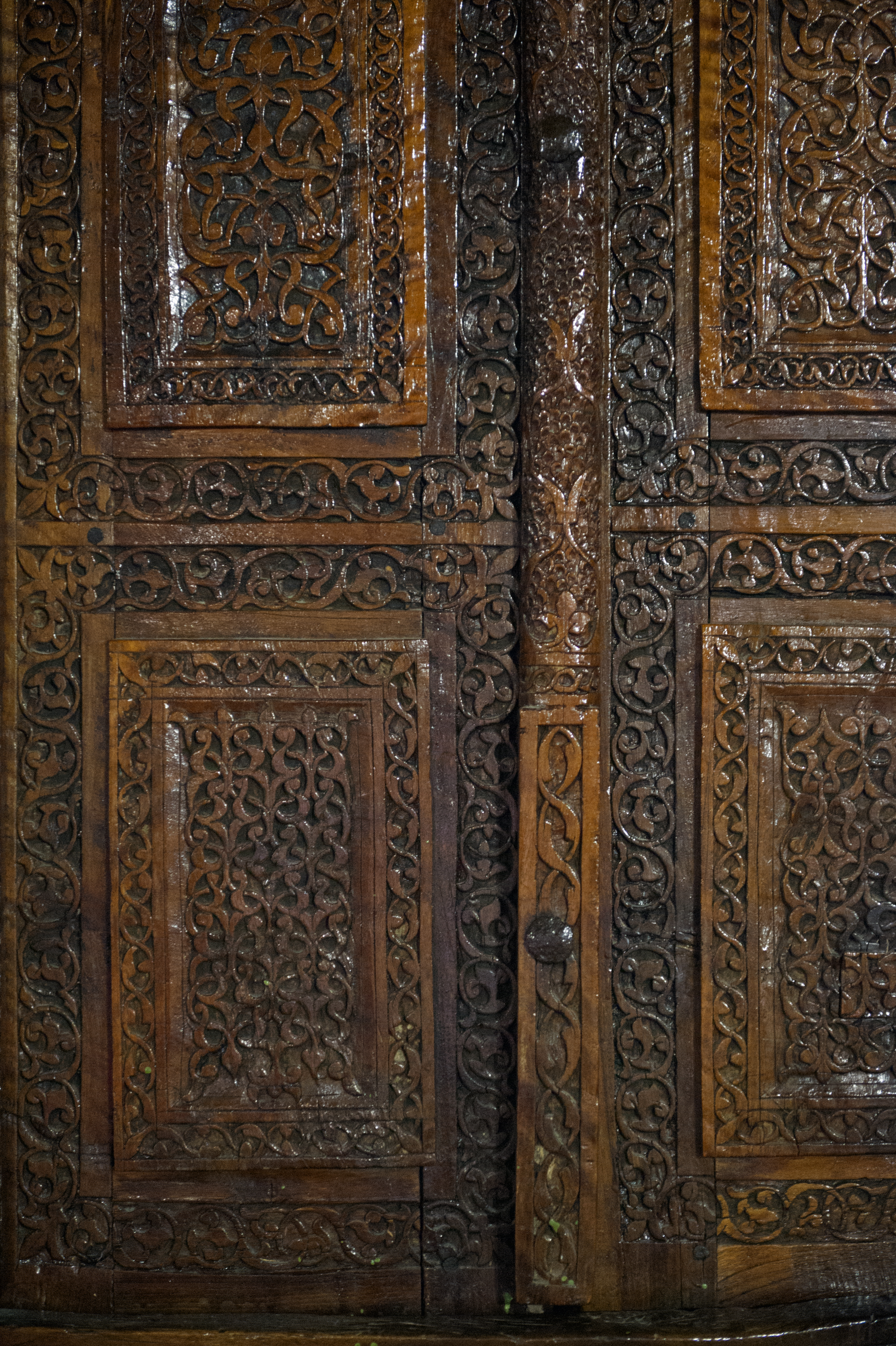
Sivrihisar Grand Mosque Minber doors detail

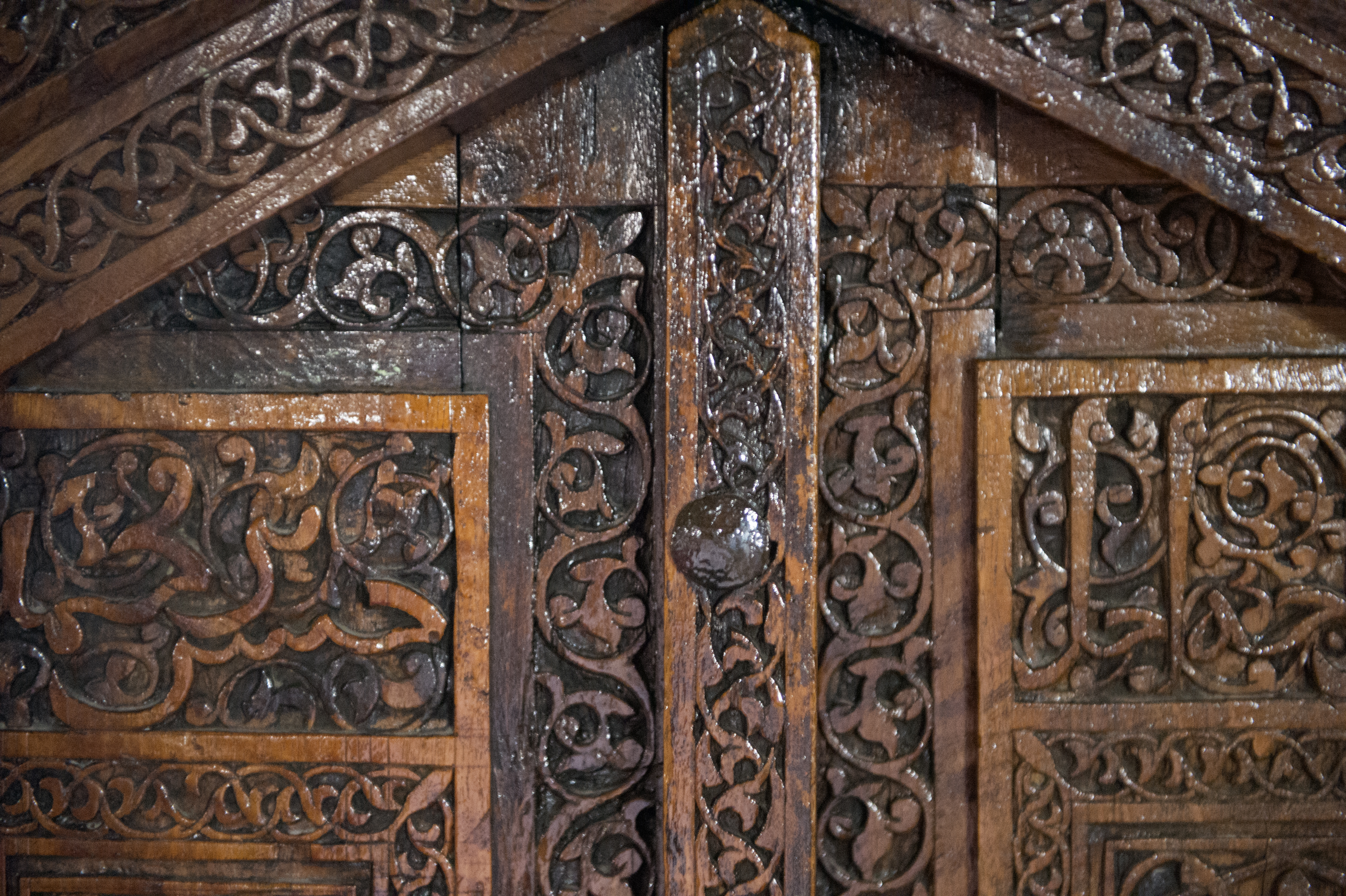
Sivrihisar Grand Mosque Minber doors detail

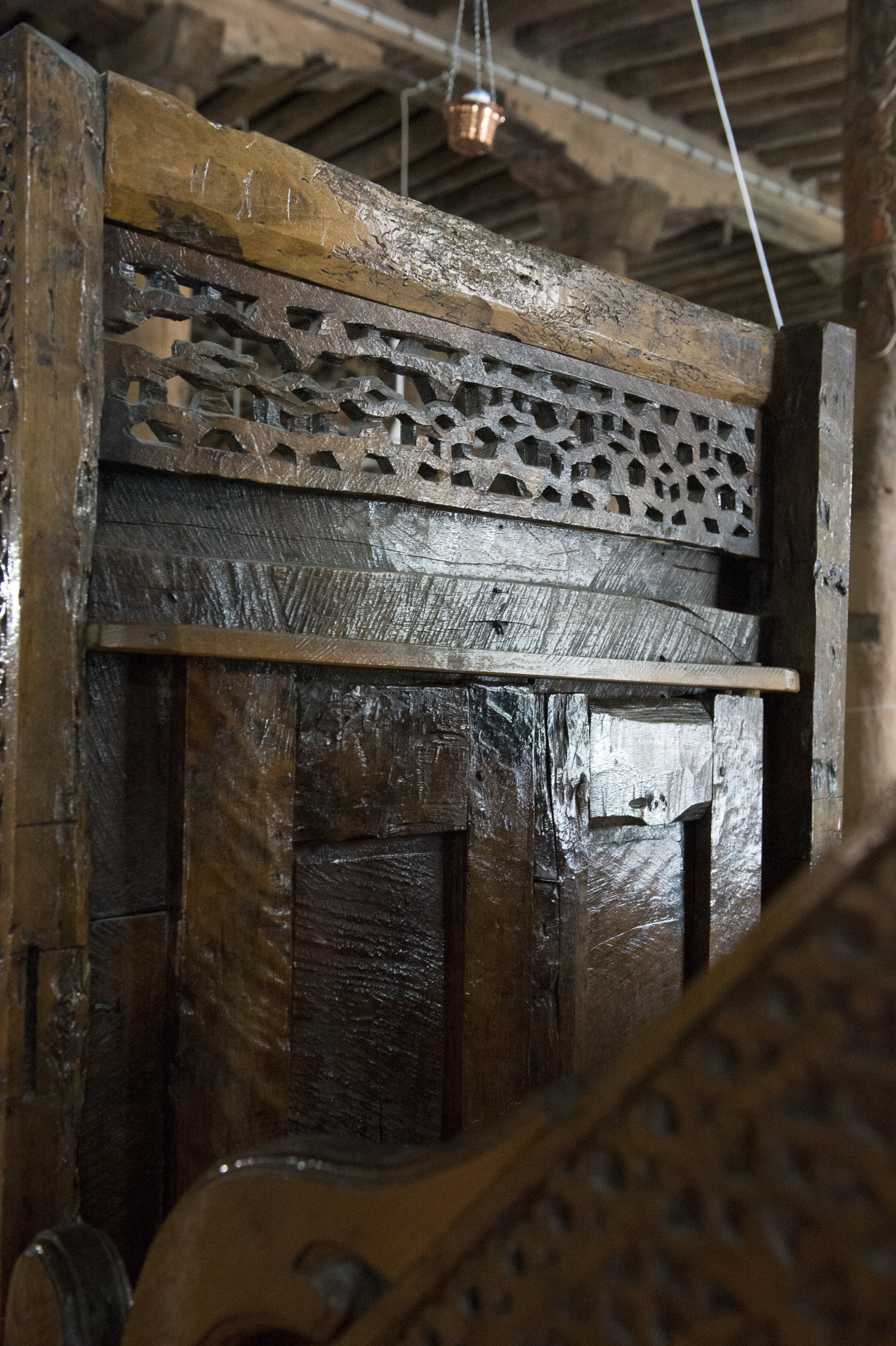
Sivrihisar Grand Mosque Interior woodwork
