= Grand Mosque of Afyonkarahisar =

13th-century Seljuk-era mosque in Afyonkarahisar, Turkey

Afyon Grand Mosque
- Afyon Ulu Camii

Location
- Location: Afyonkarahisar, Turkey
- Interactive map of Afyon Grand Mosque
- Coordinates: 38°45′18″N 30°31′46″E

Architecture
- Architect: Emir Hac Bey
- Type: Mosque
- Established: 1272
- UNESCO World Heritage Site
- Type: Cultural
- Criteria: ii, iv
- Designated: 2023
- Parent listing: Wooden Hypostyle Mosques of Medieval Anatolia
- Reference no.: 1694-001

The Afyon Grand Mosque (Turkish: Afyonkarahisar Ulu Camii) is a historical mosque in Afyonkarahisar in Afyonkarahisar province, Turkey.

== The mosque ==
The mosque is the most important one of the many mosques in town. It was built in 1272 by Hasan Nusretüddin. Its architect was Emir Hac Bey. It is an example of the Anatolian wooden mosque architecture from the Seljuk period. A wooden beam roof covering nine naves is supported by 40 wooden columns with well-executed capitals in stalactite decoration. The middle nave is slightly wider than the others, as well as slightly higher. Around the marble prayer niche some verses from the koran are written. The construction date is indicated there also. In 1341 a first restoration was executed by Muinuddin Emir Abdullah Bey, an inscription indicating this can be found on the east front door. The building was preserved in its original shape with a flat roof, however another roof was added during a more recent restoration. The minaret is in brick with lozenge glazed shapes for decoration, a rare survivor from Seljuk times.

== Gallery ==
Afyon Grand Mosque Exterior minaret

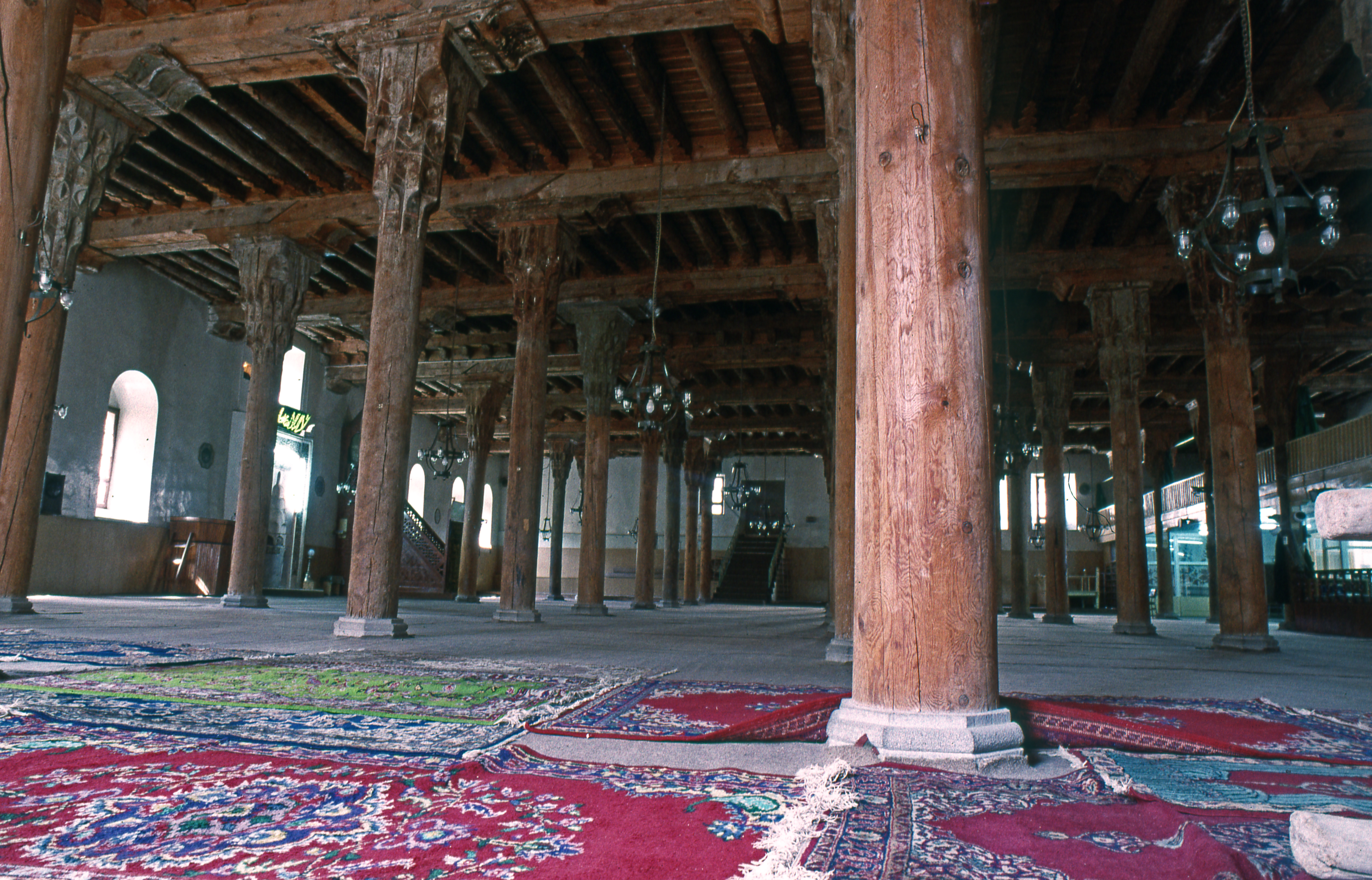
Afyon Grand Mosque Interior with carpets

Afyon Grand Mosque Interior with mihrab and minber

Afyon Grand Mosque Interior minber

Afyon Grand Mosque Interior Mihrab

Afyon Grand Mosque Interior door of mihrab

Afyon Grand Mosque Interior Ceiling

Afyon Grand Mosque Interior ceiling close up

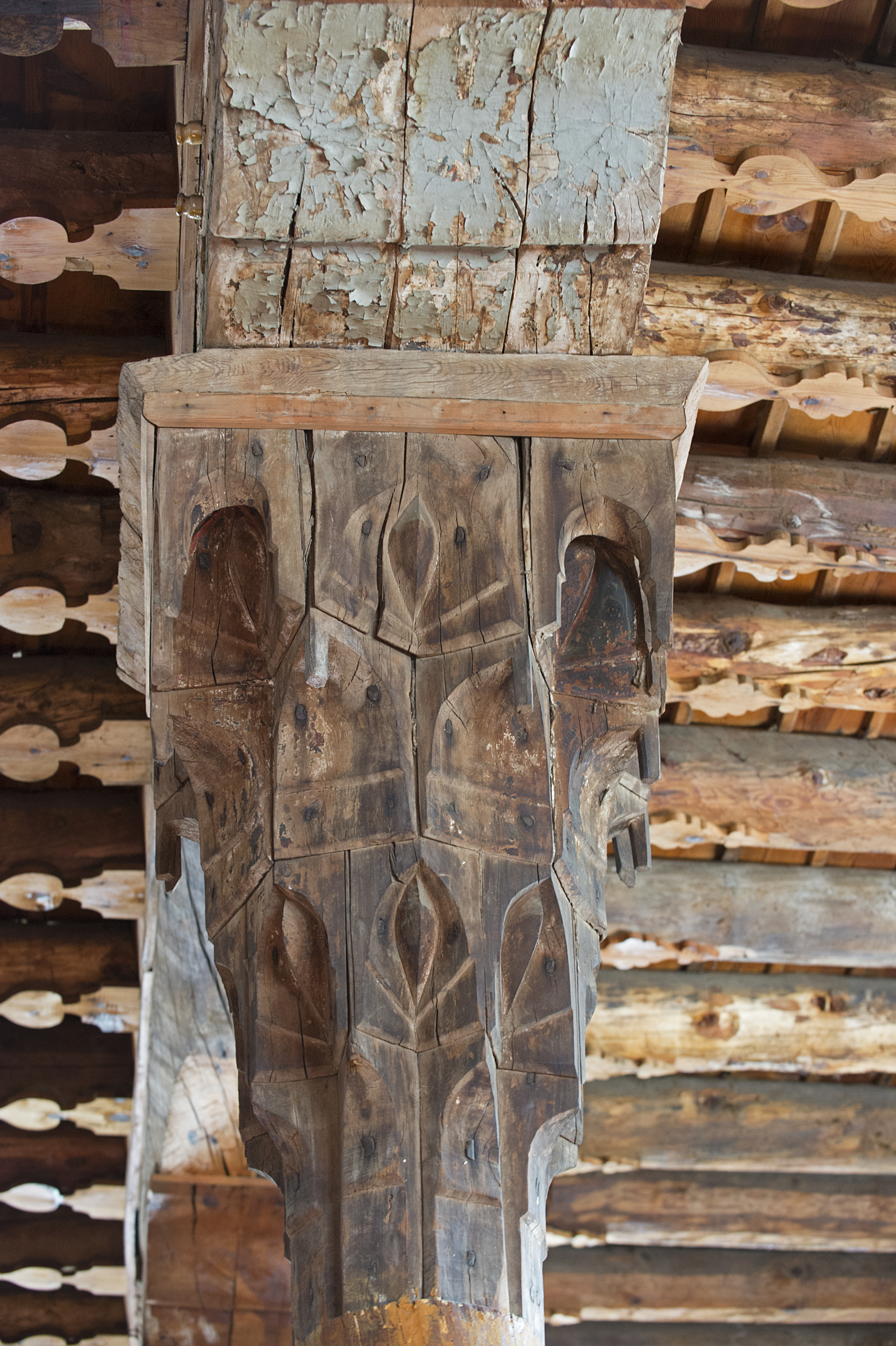
Afyon Grand Mosque Interior detail of capital

Afyon Grand Mosque Interior detail of capital
