= Aslanhane Mosque =

Mosque in Ankara, Turkey

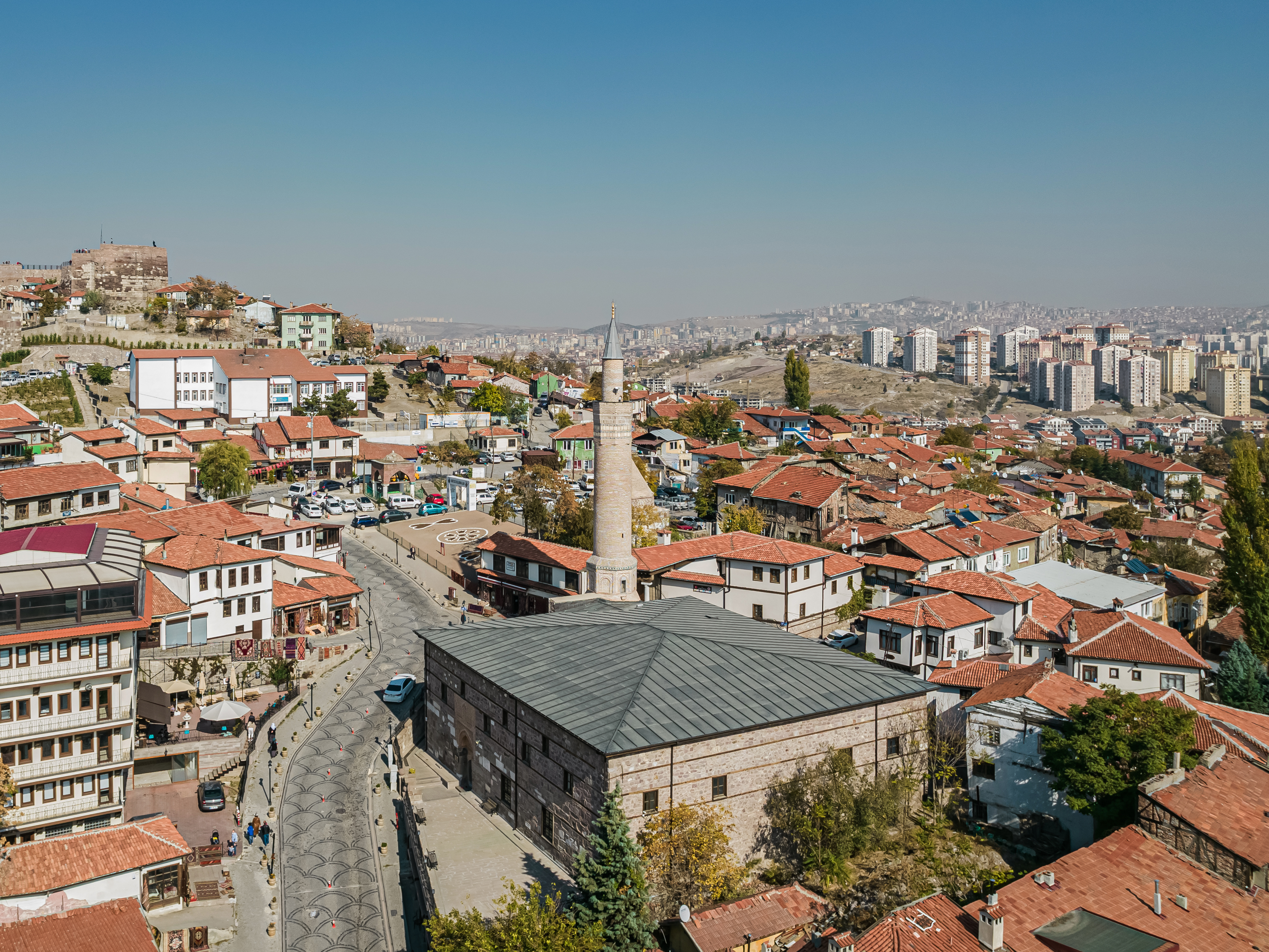

- Location of the mosque in Turkey

Religion
- Affiliation: Islam

Location
- Location: Ankara, Turkey
- Coordinates: 39°56′12″N 32°51′55″E

Architecture
- Architect: Ebubekir Mehmet
- Type: Mosque
- Style: Seljuk
- Completed: 1290; 736 years ago

Specifications
- Minaret: 1
- Materials: Face stone and Rubble stone
- UNESCO World Heritage Site
- Type: Cultural
- Criteria: ii, iv
- Designated: 2023
- Parent listing: Wooden Hypostyle Mosques of Medieval Anatolia
- Reference no.: 1694-002

Aslanhāne Mosque (Turkish: Arslanhane Camisi) aka Ahi Sherafeddin Mosque is a 13th-century mosque in Ankara, and one of the oldest in Turkey.

== Location ==
The mosque is in the old quarter of Ankara next to Ankara Castle. With an altitude of 947 metres (3,107 ft) it overlooks Ankara at 39°56′12″N 32°51′55″E.

== History ==
Built during the reign of Mesud II of the Seljuks of Rum in 1290, the mosque is one of the oldest mosques in Turkey still standing. Its architect was Ebubekir Mehmet. It was commissioned by two Ahi leaders named Hüsamettin and Hasaneddin. However, in 1330, it was repaired by another Ahi leader named Şerafettin after whom the mosque was named. After several minor repairs the mosque was restored by the Directorate General of Foundations in 2010-2013 term.

== The building ==
The square-plan building with 400 square metres (4,300 sq ft) area has one minaret. Its wooden roof is supported by 24 large wood columns. It has 3 gates and 12 windows The mihrab is decorated with Seljuk tiles. The building material is mostly spolia from earlier buildings.

Şerafettin's tomb is facing the mosque. There was a lion statue which was buried in the walls of Şerafettin's mosque. That's why the popular name of the mosque is Aslanhane meaning the house of the lion.

== Gallery ==
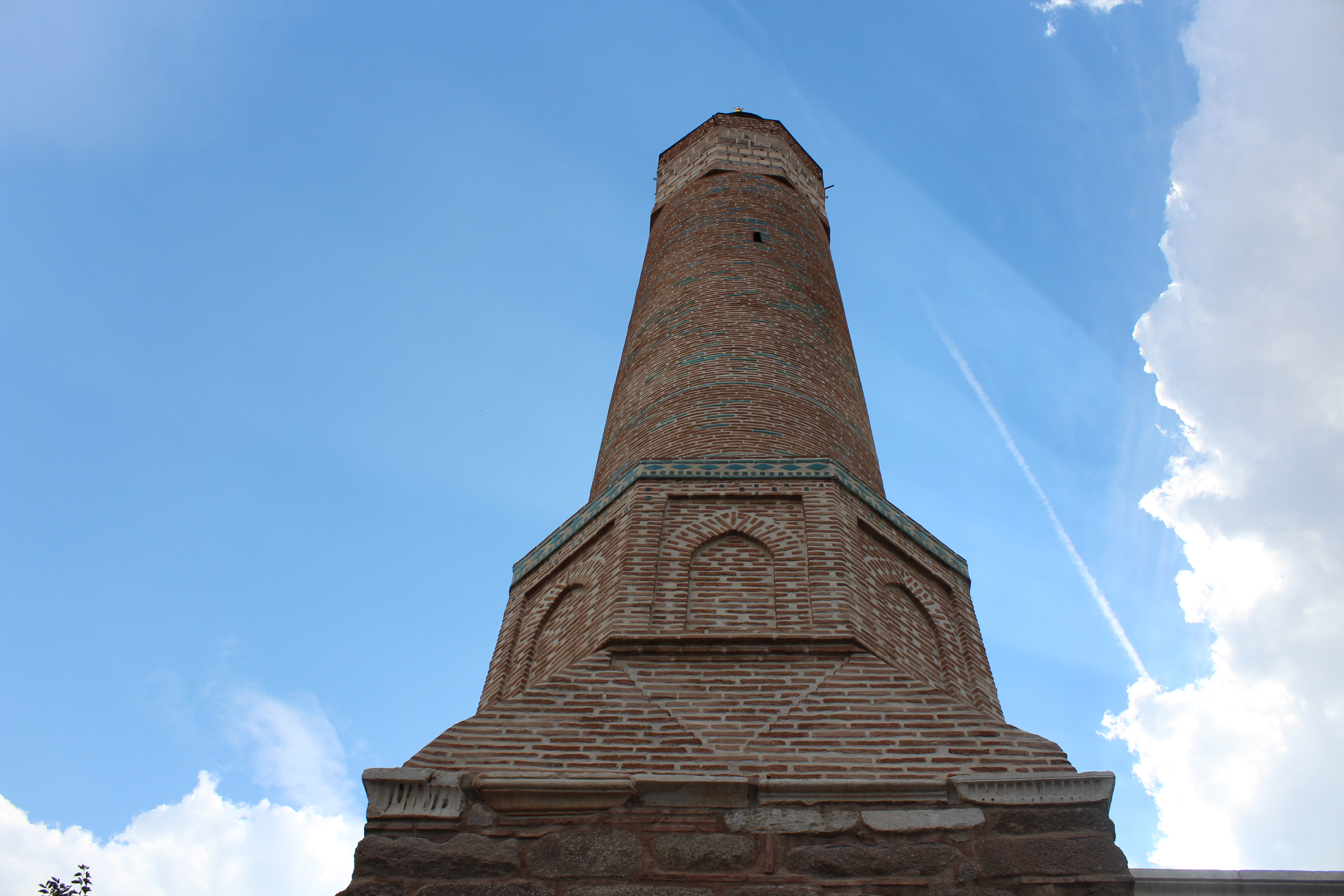
The minaret

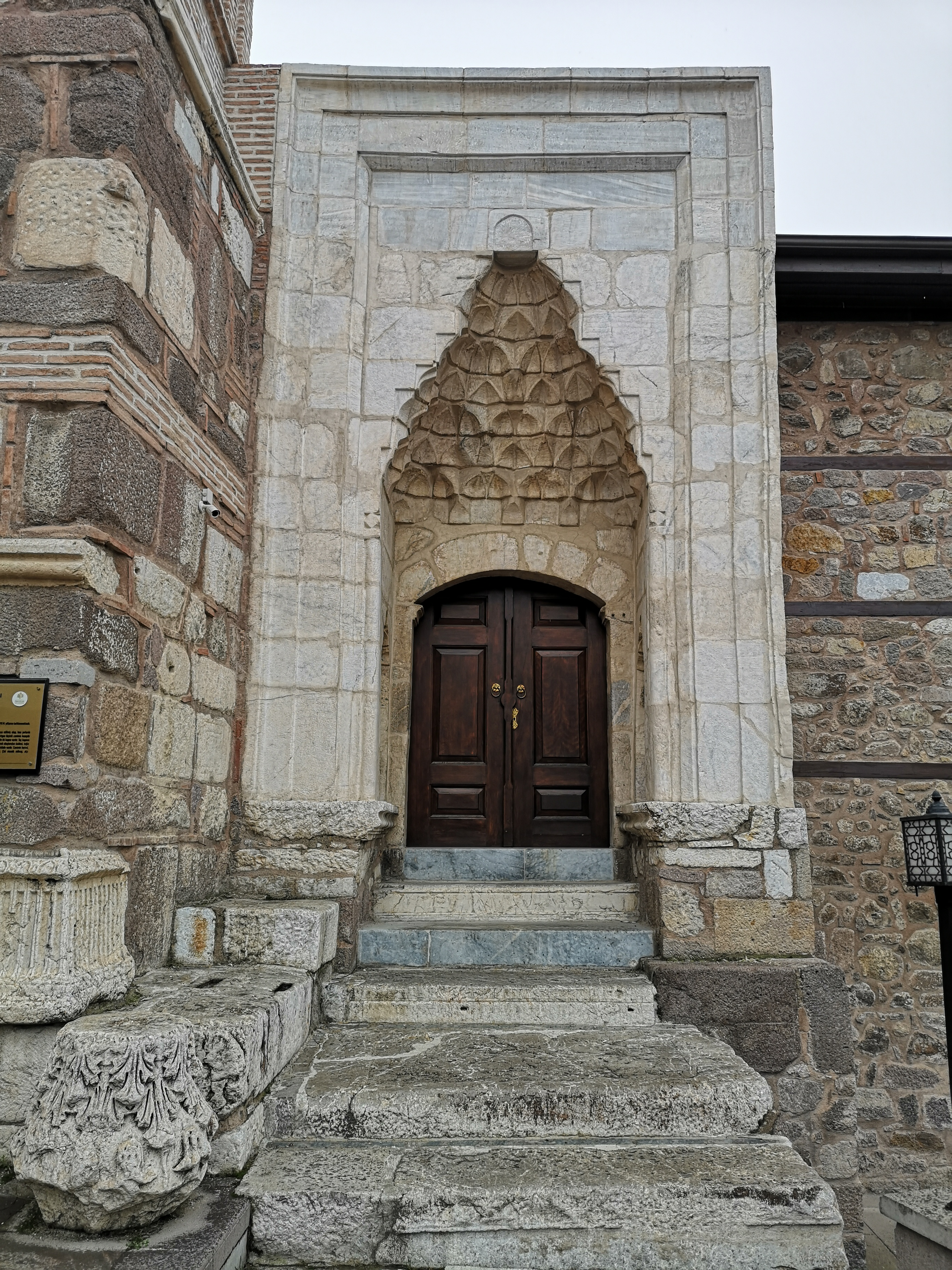
Main entrance

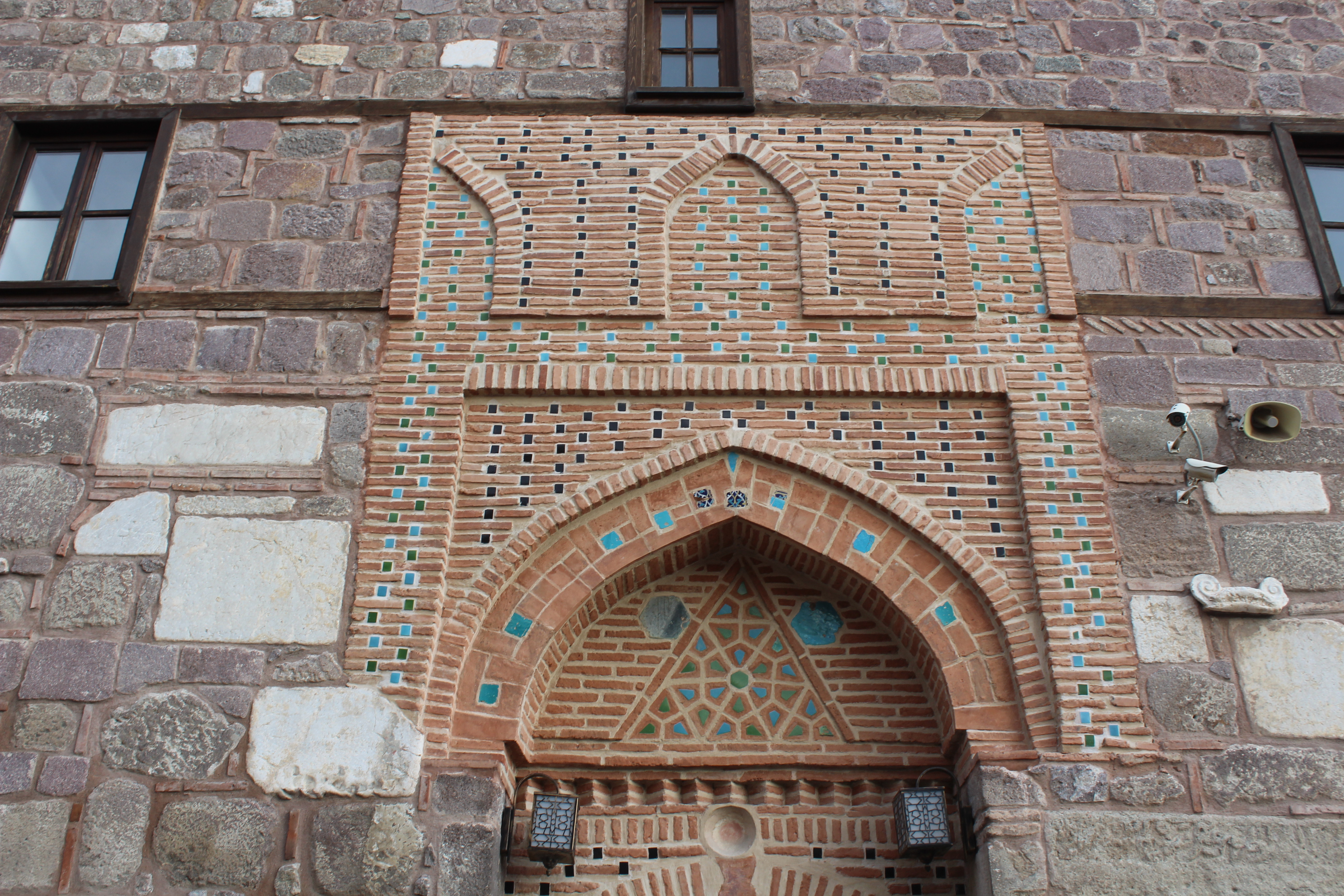
Archivolt of the west entrance

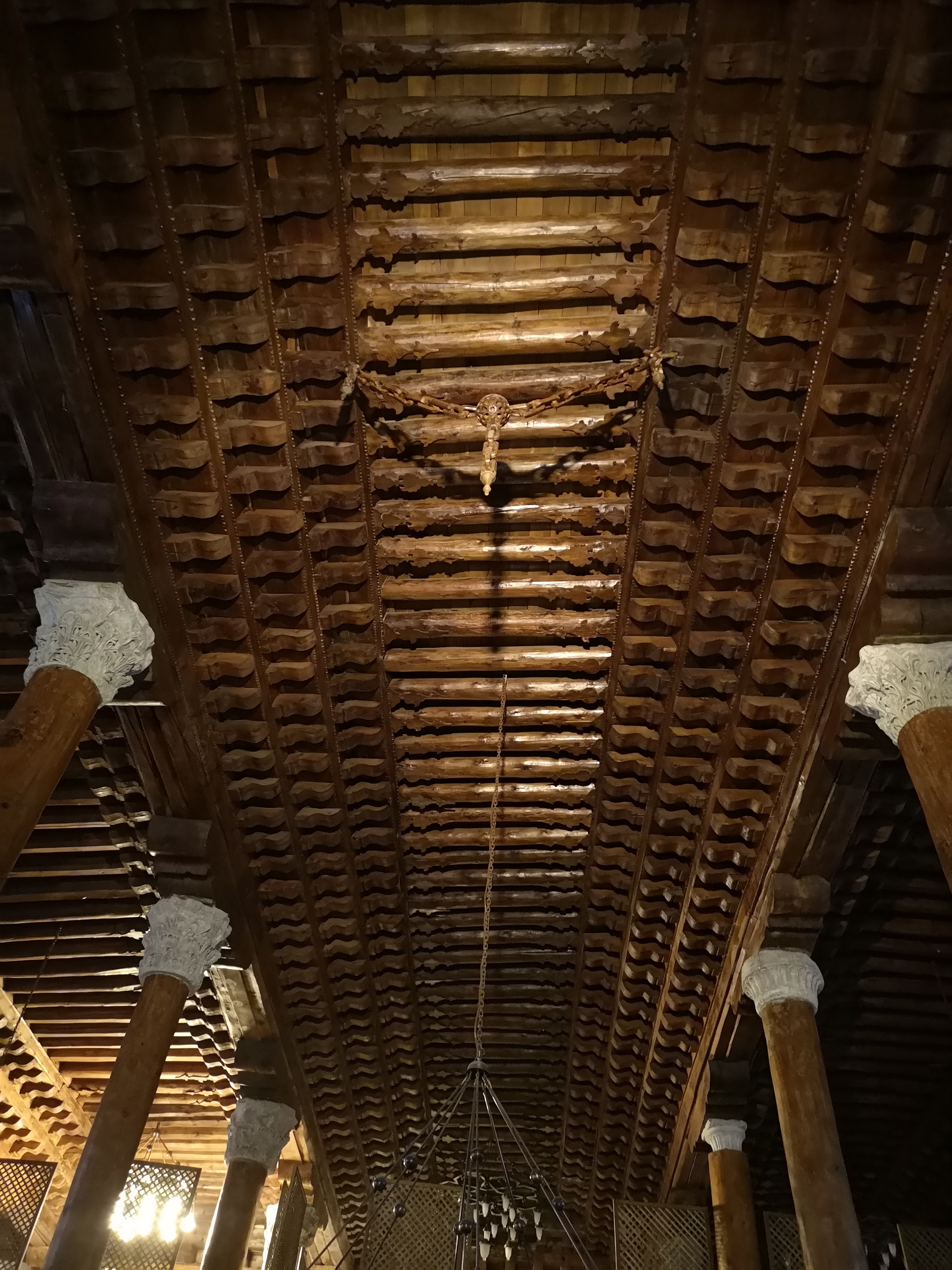
Wooden ceiling of the mosque

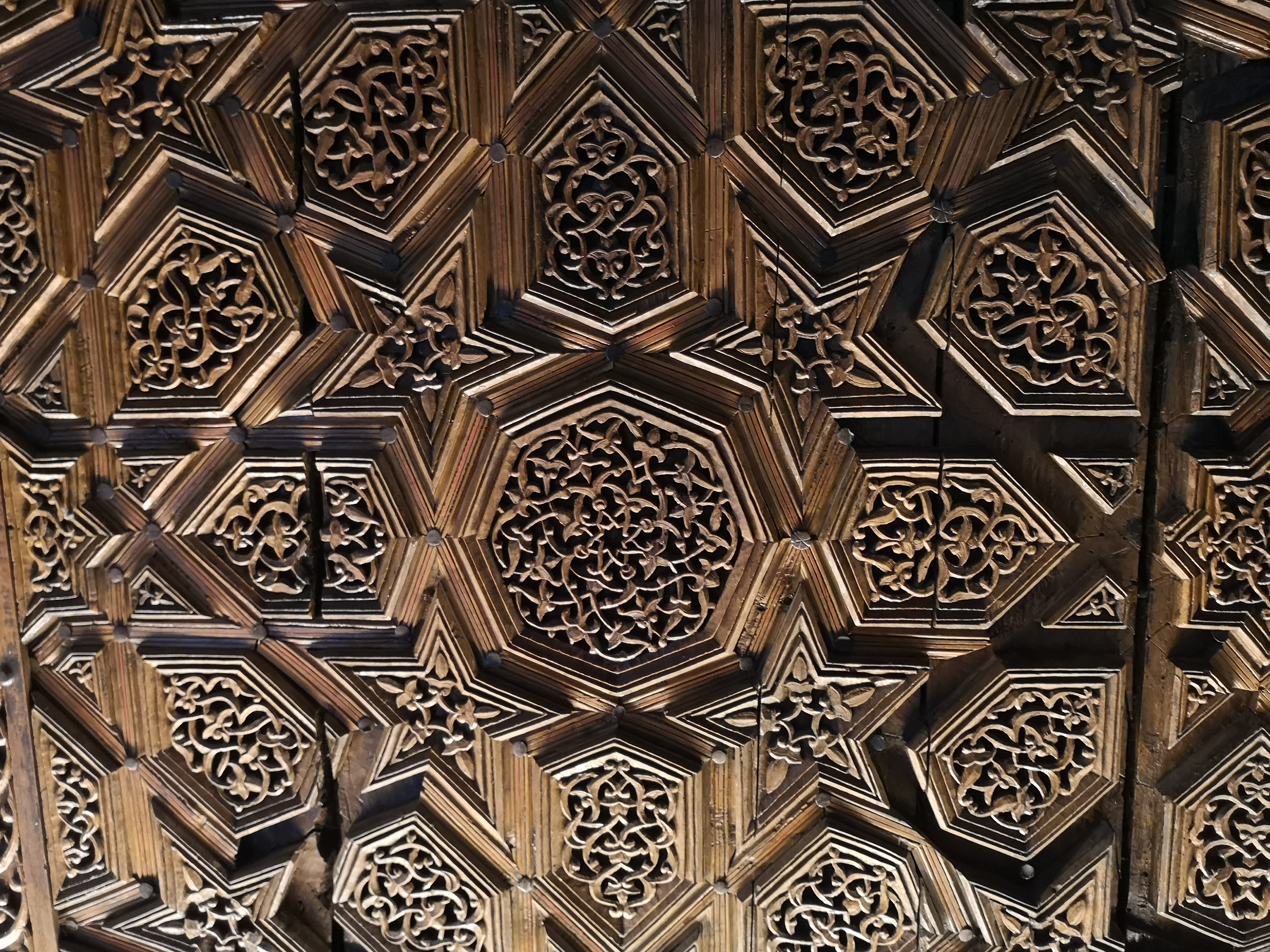
Minbar details

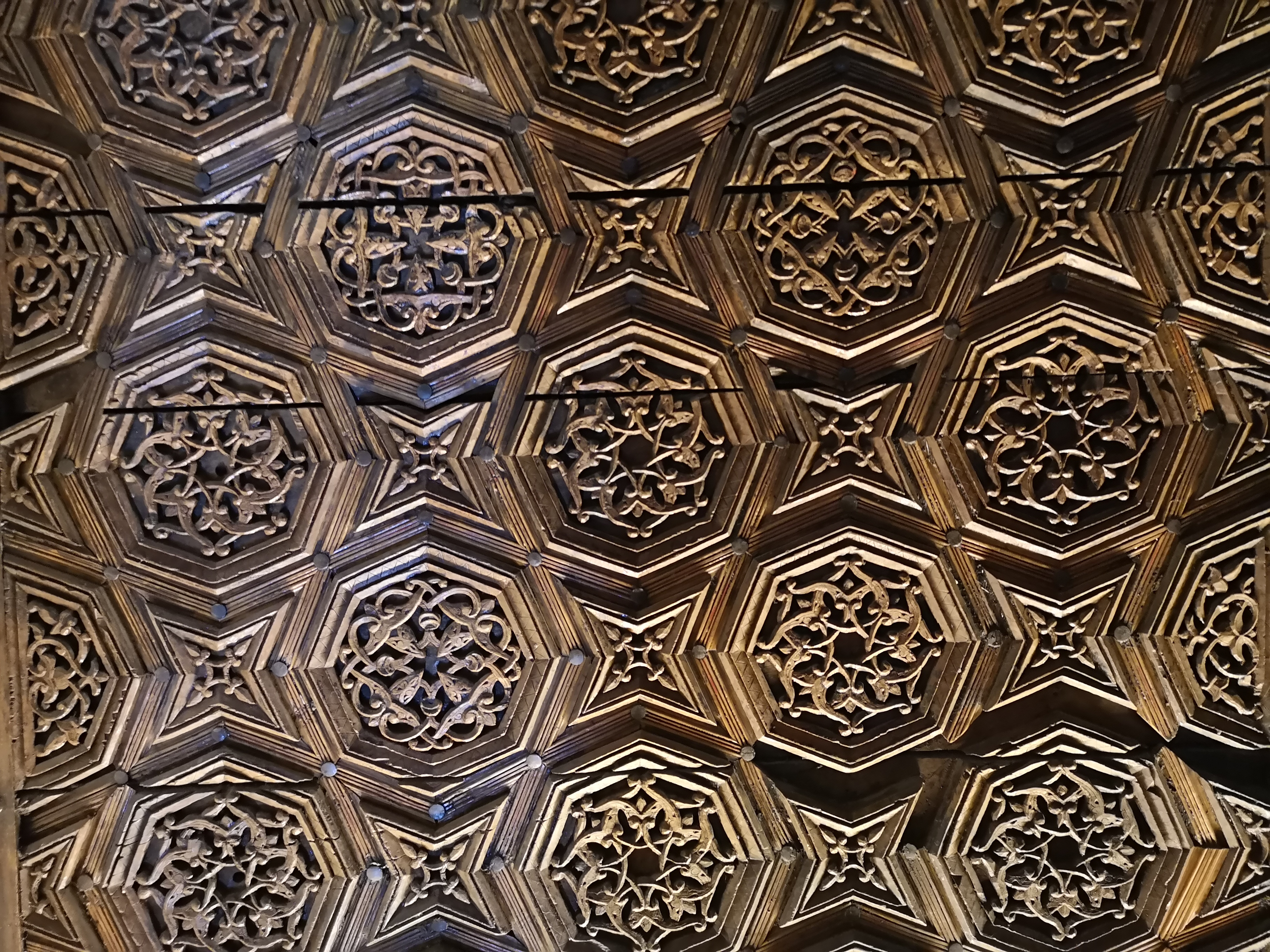
Minbar details

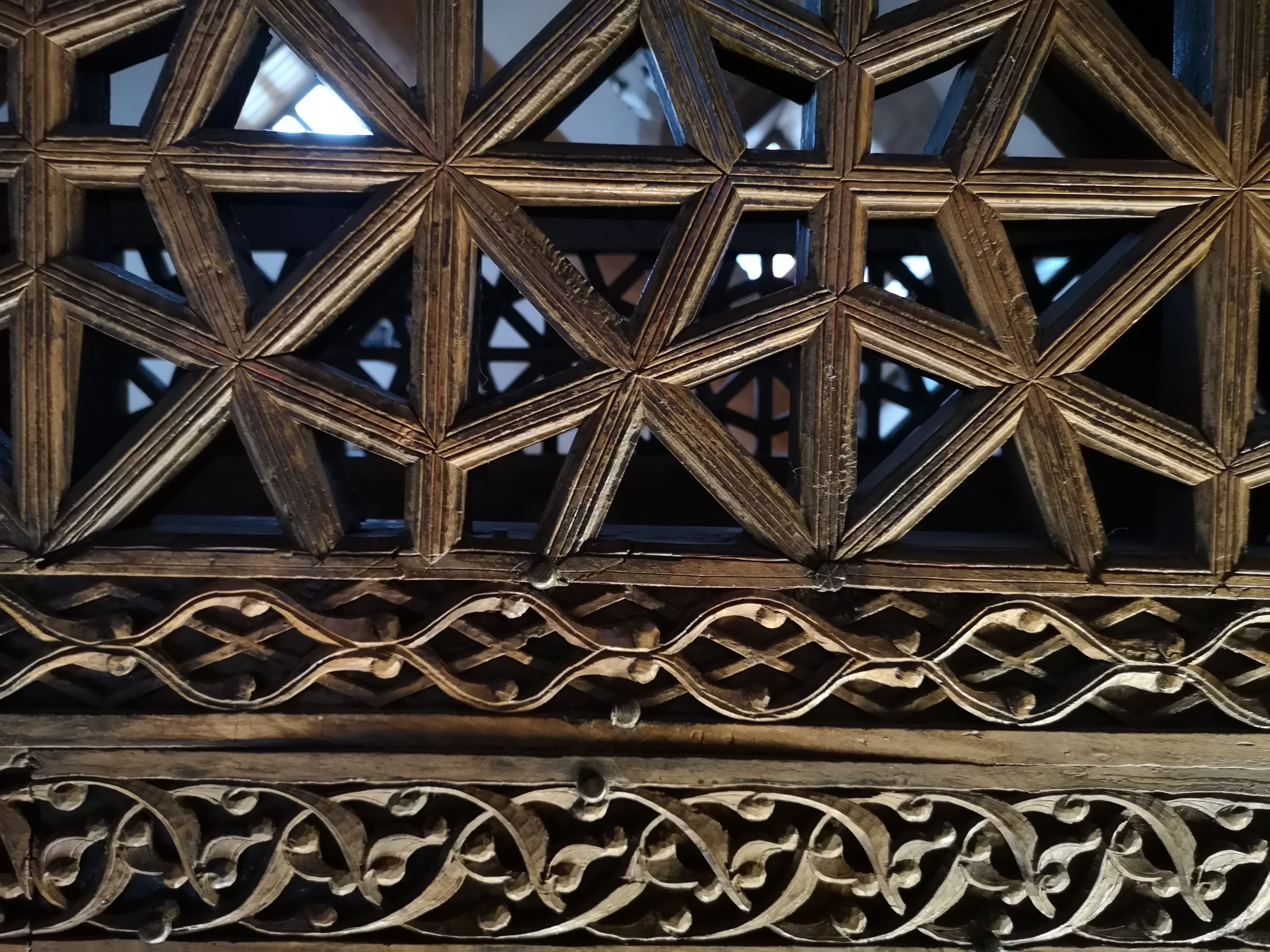
Minbar details

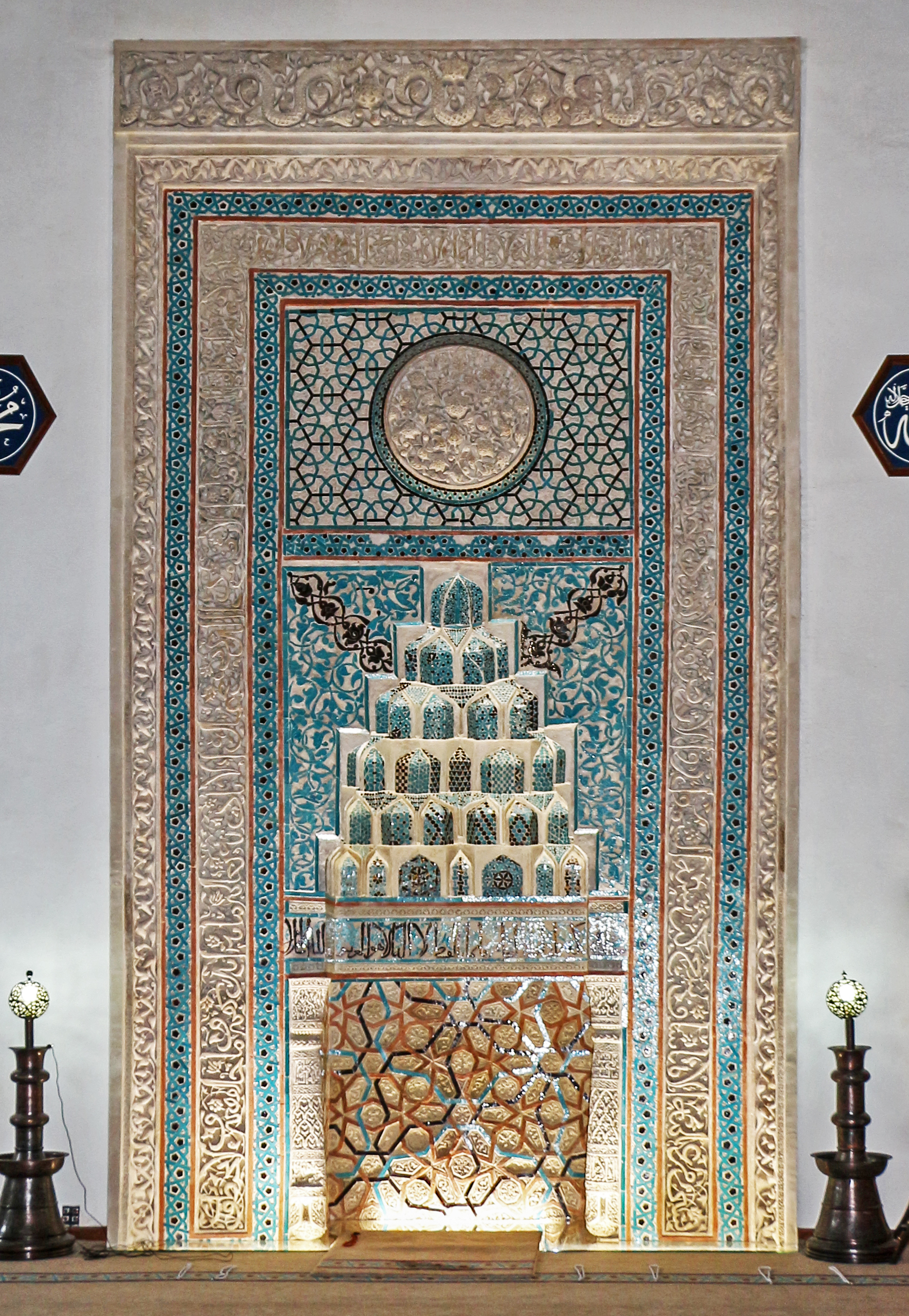
The mihrab

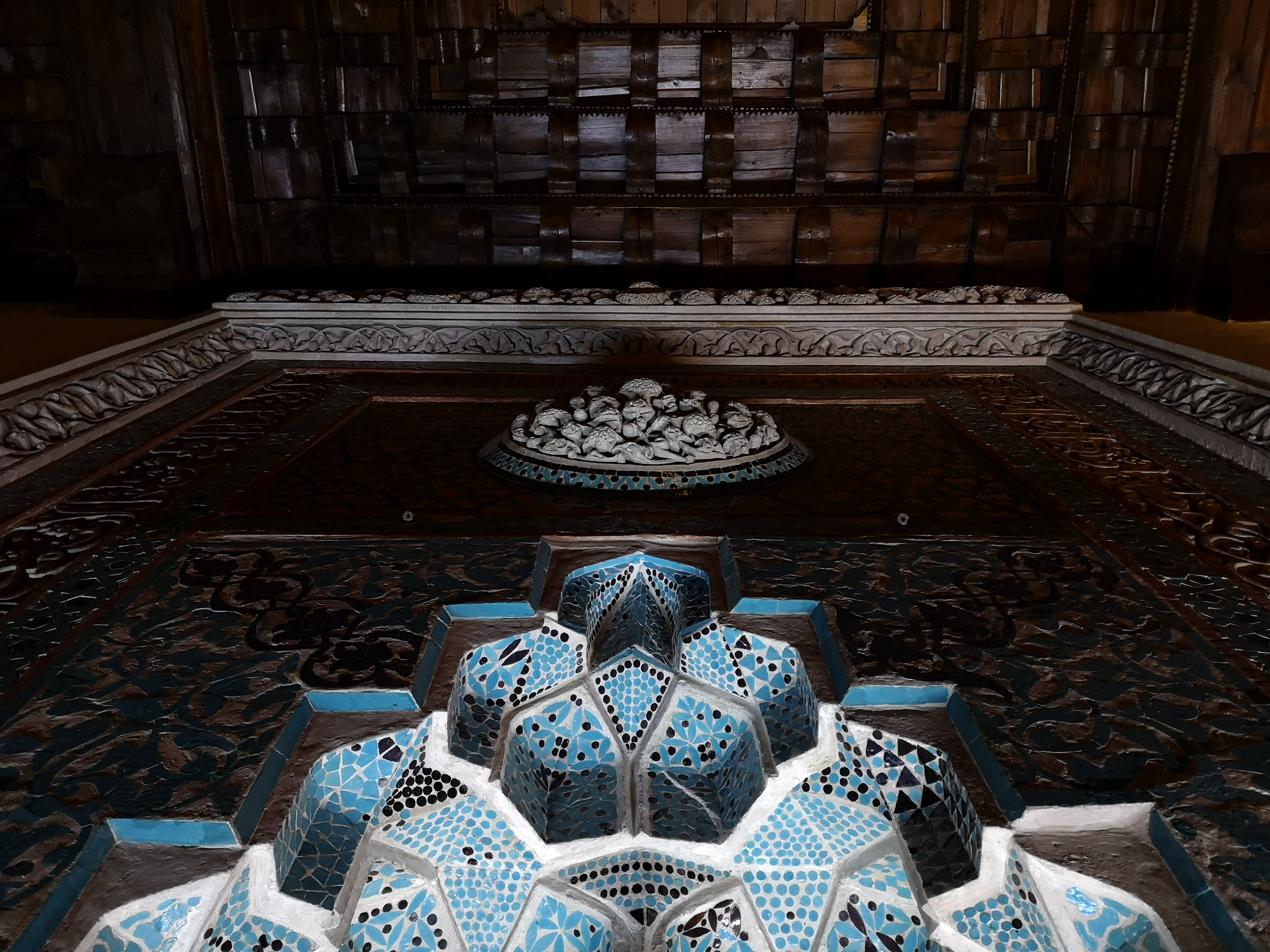
Mihrab details

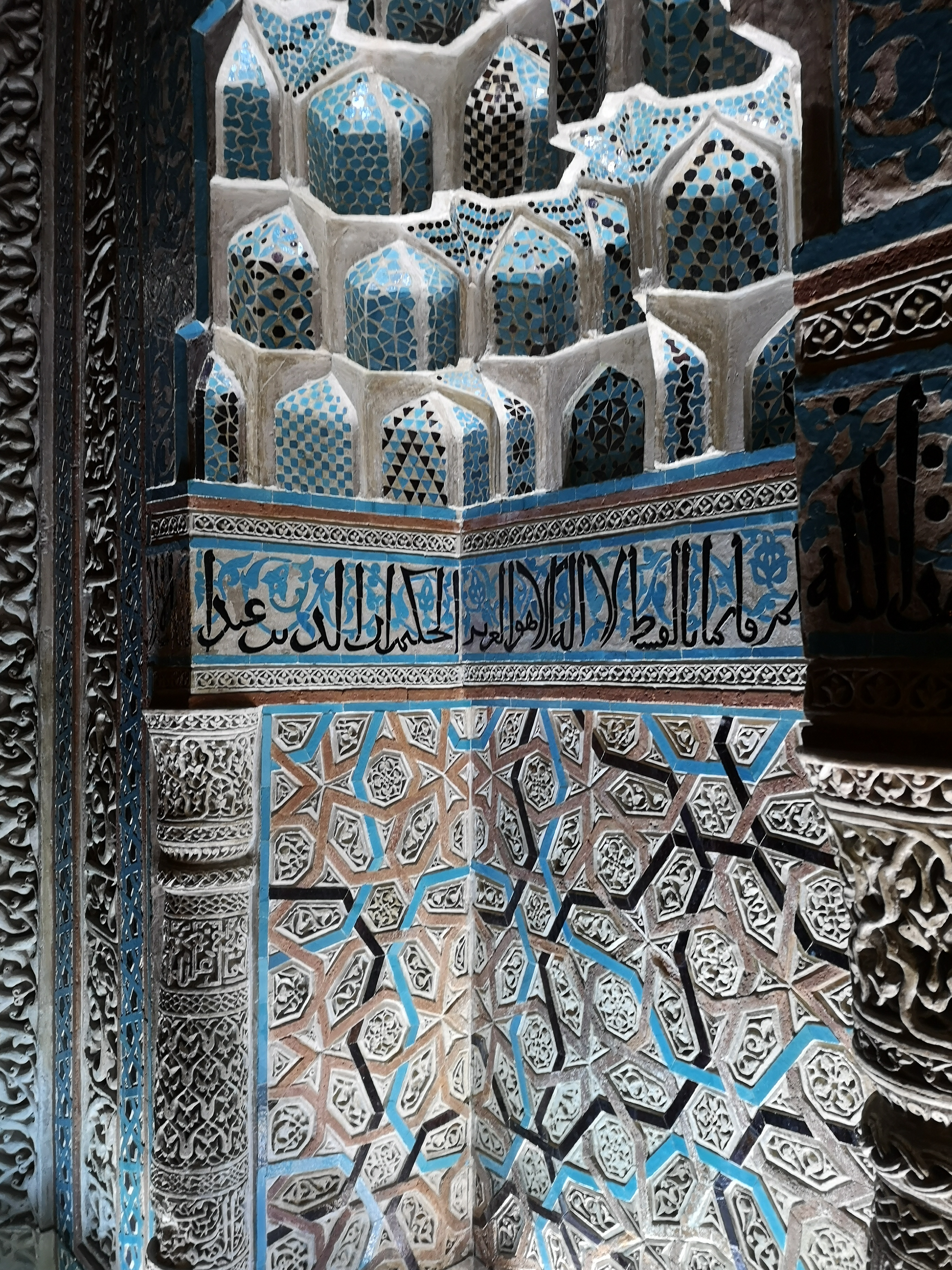
Mihrab details

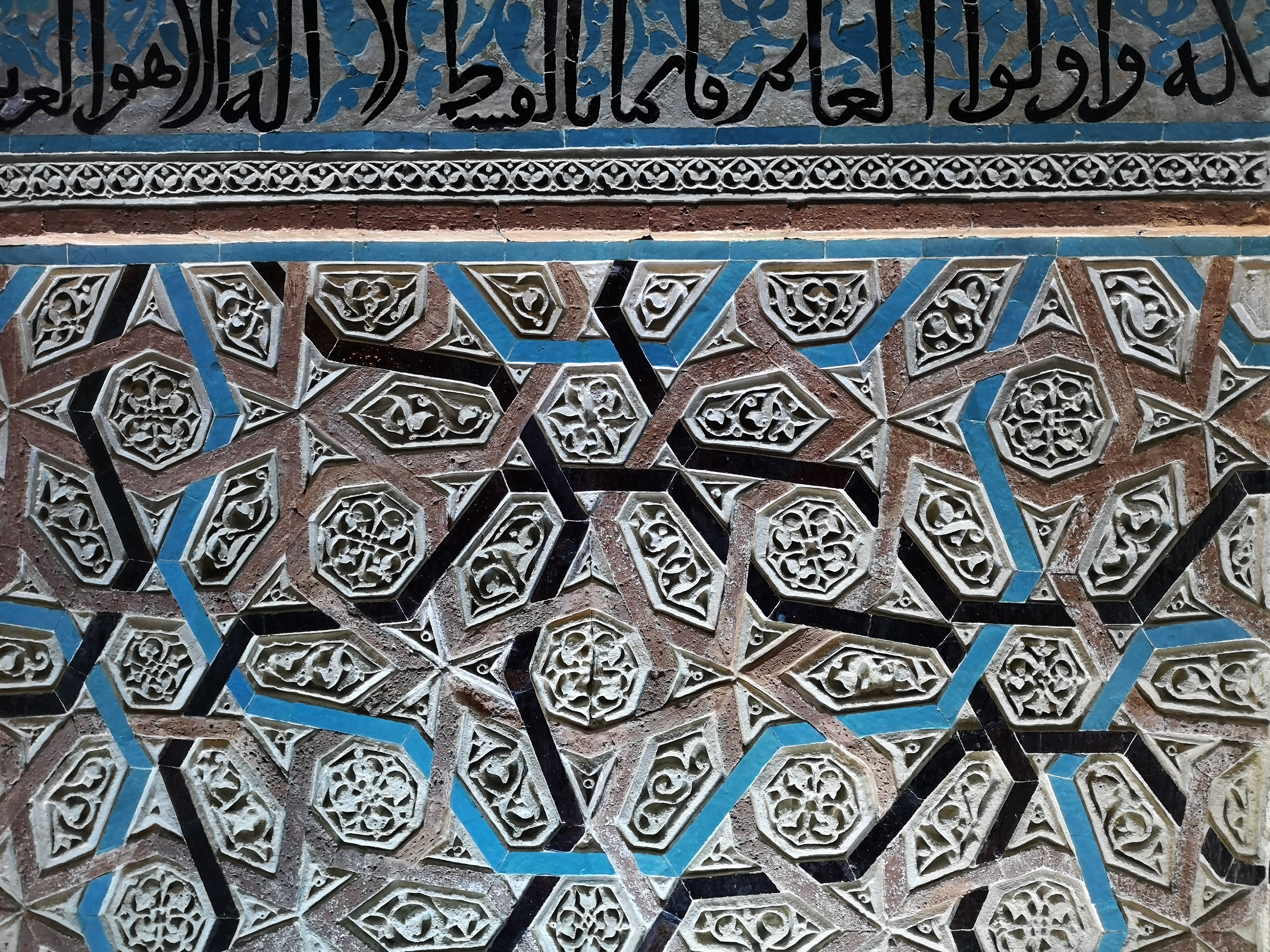
Mihrab details

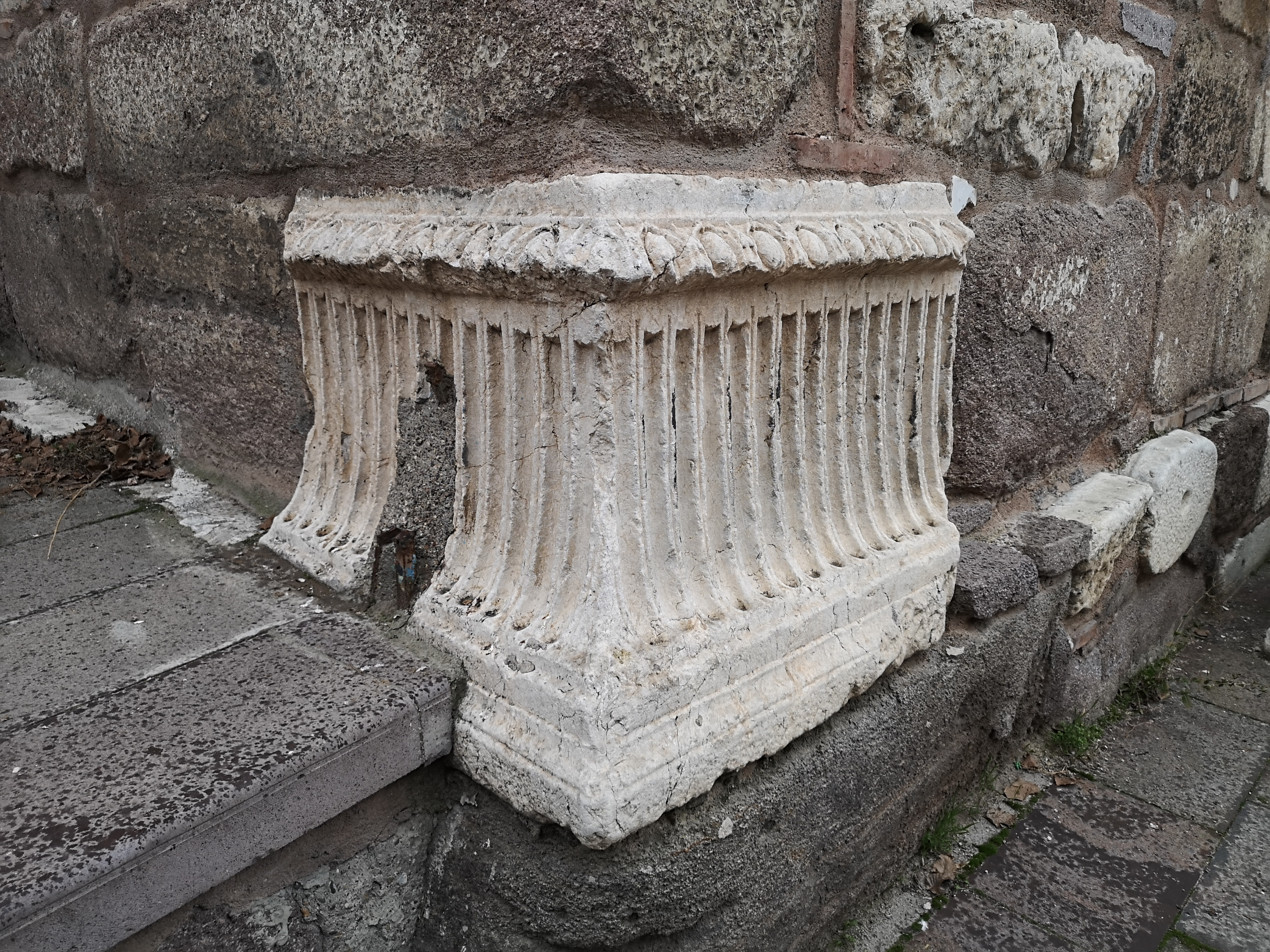
Spolia use at the exterior walls

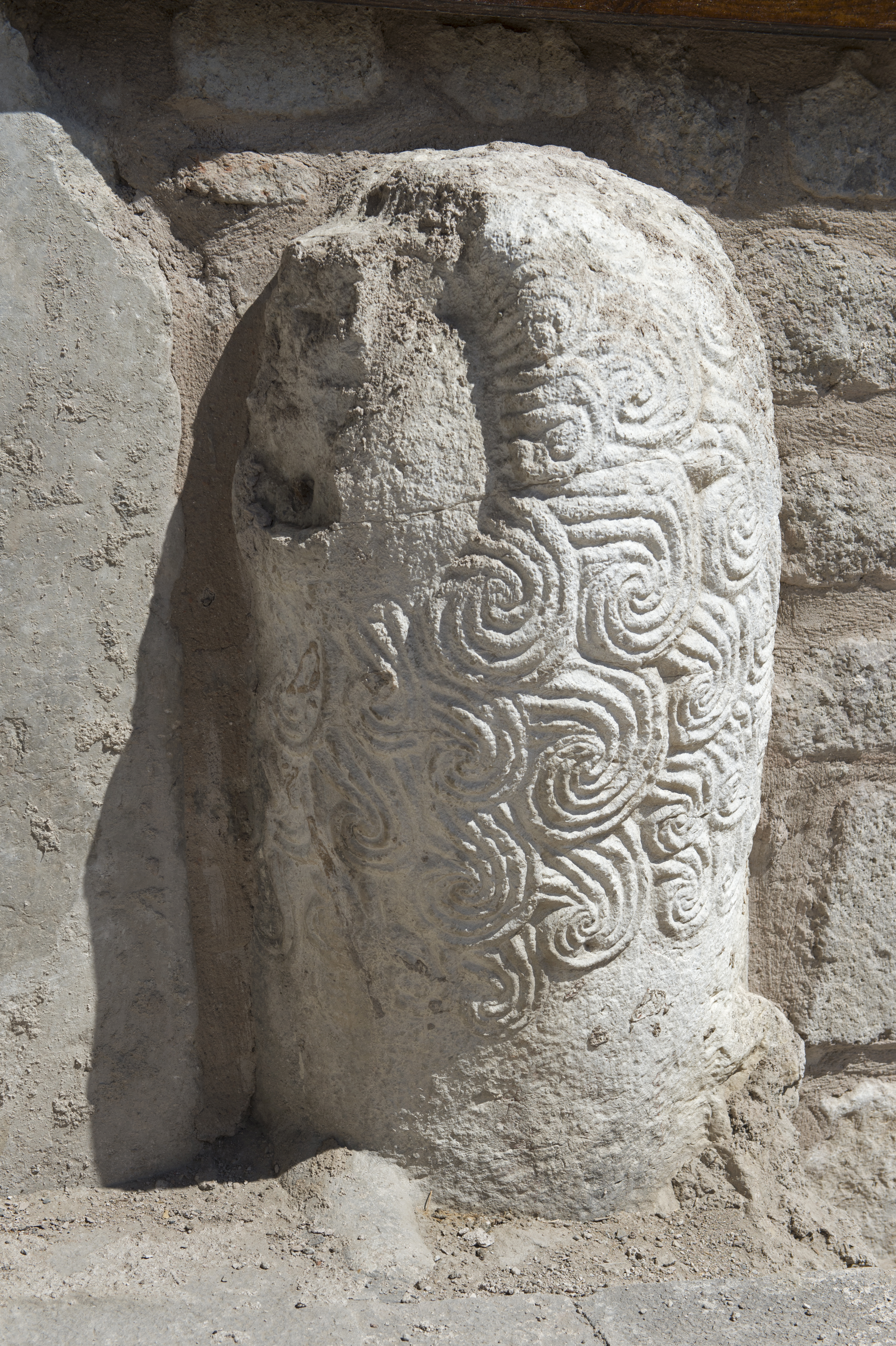
Lion fragment, now across street from mosque
