= List of Turkish Grand Mosques =

This is a list of Turkish Grand Mosques or Ulucami, a title originally given to the grandest Friday mosque of a Turkish city where local citizens traditionally gathered en masse for Friday Prayers, though today it is common for Muslims in a single city to gather in several different mosques for these prayers.

== Turkish Grand Mosques ==
Province	City	Name	Commissioner	Date
Istanbul	Fatih	Holy Hagia Sophia Grand Mosque (Note: Hagia Sophia represented the power of Christianity and Islam respectively under the ruling Byzantine and Ottoman empires. In the Turkish Republican period, the building has been subject to a new shift of meaning, representing the power of the new, modern, secular Republic and has been used as one of the means to convey its ideals. From being the Grand Mosque of the old capital, this imperial monument was converted into a museum during the early years of the Turkish Republic – another turning point in its history.)	Sultan Mehmed II	1453
Kars	Kars	Kars Ulucami	Dilaver Pasha	1643
Karaman	Ermenek	Ermenek Grand Mosque	Mahmud Bey (of the Karamanids)	1302–3AD (702AD)
Kayseri	Bünyan	Bünyan Grand Mosque	Zahireddin Mahmud	1333
Kayseri	Kayseri	Kayseri Grand Mosque	Melik Muhammed	1134-1143
Erzincan	Erzincan	Gülâbi-bey Mosque	Gülâbi Bey	1486
Tokat	Tokat	Tokat Grand Mosque	Danishmends	1679 AD
Tokat	Niksar	Niksar Grand Mosque	Muineddin Süleyman Pervane	1145/46
Tokat	Zile	Zile Grand Mosque	Abu Ali	1266-1267 AD (665 AH)
Çankırı	Çankırı	Çankırı Grand Mosque	Suleiman I	1558
Bolu	Bolu	Bolu Ulucami	Bayezid I	1390
Konya	Ereğli	Ereğli Ulucami	Karamanid Mehmet Bey	1426
Konya	Akşehir	Akşehir Grand Mosque	Kaykaus I	1213
Konya	Konya	Konya Grand Mosque (Alaeddin Mosque)	Alaeddin Keykubad	1219-1220
Konya	Beyşehir	Eşrefoğlu Mosque	Eşrefoğlu Süleyman Bey	1299
Çorum	Çorum	Çorum Grand Mosque	Hayreddin	1300s?
Siirt	Siirt	Siirt Grand Mosque	Mugīsüddin Mahmud bin Muhammed (Iraqi Seljuk ruler)	1129
Muğla	Milas	Milas Grand Mosque	Ahmed Gazi Bey	1378
Muğla	Muğla	Muğla Ulucami	İbrahim of Menteşe	1340
Edirne	Edirne	Edirne Old Mosque	Mehmed I	1414
Kastamonu	Kastamonu	Atabey Camii		1273
Kastamonu	Küre	Küre Grand Mosque		Before 1465-66 AD (870 AH)* (Note: It is understood from the foundation charter dated 870 (1465-66) of the mosque (Hoca Şemseddin Mosque) in the Câmi-i Kebîr district that it was built by Hoca Şemseddin before this date.)
Hatay	Antakya	Antakya Grand Mosque	Sultan Baybars I	1271
Adana	Adana	Adana Ulucami	Halil Bey of Ramadanids-Piri Mehmet Pasha	1513
Adana	Kozan	Hoşkadem Mosque		1448
Kilis	Kilis	Kilis Ulucami		1339
Gaziantep	Gaziantep	Ömeriye Cami		1210?
Batman	Hasankeyf	Hasankeyf Grand Mosque		1324
Malatya	Malatya	Malatya Grand Mosque (Note: The Malatya Grand Mosque holds a unique place in the history of Turkish art and architecture, whether for its layout, its dome design, or its embellishment.)	Kayqubad I	1224
Bayburt	Bayburt	Bayburt Grand Mosque	Mesud II	1298
İzmir	Selçuk	Isa Bey Mosque	Aydinid İsa Bey	1375
İzmir	Birgi	Birgi Grand Mosque	Aydinids	1311
İzmir	Bergama	Bergama Grand Mosque	Bayezid I	1399
İzmir	Ödemiş	Ödemiş Ulucami	Aydinid Mahmud Bey	1311
İzmir	Tire	Tire Grand Mosque	Aydınoğlu Cüneyd Bey	1405-1426 AD
Antalya	Antalya	Yivli Minare Mosque	Kayqubad I	1230
Van	Van	Van Grand Mosque	Qara Yusuf of Karaköy	1389-1400 AD
Van	Adilcevaz	Adilcevaz Ulucami		1300-1500?
Afyon	Afyon	Afyon Grand Mosque		1272
Ankara	Ankara	Arslanhane Ulucami		1290
Eskişehir	Sivrihisar	Sivrihisar Grand Mosque	Cemaleddin Ali Bey	1232
Eskişehir	Eskişehir	Eskişehir Ulucami	Kaykhusraw III	1267
Samsun	Samsun	Samsun Ulucami		1885
Manisa	Manisa	Manisa Ulucami	Muzafferüddin İshak Çelebi	1366
Kahramanmaraş	Afşin	Afşin Grand Mosque	Mehmed, son of Pir Ali, of the Danishmends	1571
Kahramanmaraş	Elbistan	Elbistan Grand Mosque	Mübarizüddin Çavlı	1239-1240
Kahramanmaraş	Kahramanmaraş	Maraş Grand Mosque	Süleyman Bey of the Dulkadirids	1442-1454
Isparta	Isparta	Isparta Grand Mosque	Kutlu Bey	1429
Isparta	Eğridir	Eğridir Grand Mosque	Hizir Bey	1301-1302
Mardin	Mardin	Mardin Grand Mosque	Artukids	1176-77 AD (572 AH)
Mardin	Kızıltepe	Kızıltepe Grand Mosque	Ebü'l-Feth Artuk Arslan of the Artukids	1204-1205 AD
Bitlis	Bitlis	Bitlis Grand Mosque	Artukids	1126
Şanlıurfa	Şanlıurfa	Grand Mosque of Urfa	Zengids	c.1190 AD
Şanlıurfa	Harran	Harran Grand Mosque	Marwan II	744-750
Sinop	Sinop	Sinop Grand Mosque	Muînüddin Süleyman Pervâne	1268
Burdur	Burdur	Burdur Ulucami	Dündar Bey	1299
Kütahya	Kütahya	Kütahya Grand Mosque	Ottomans	1410
Aksaray	Aksaray	Aksaray Grand Mosque	Mehmet II of Karaman	1408
Bursa	Bursa	Bursa Grand Mosque (Note: Bursa Grand Mosque is among the distinguished examples of early Ottoman religious architecture.)	Beyazit I	1396
Diyarbakır	Diyarbakır	Diyarbakır Grand Mosque	Malikshah of Seljuks	1091
Diyarbakır	Silvan	Silvan Grand Mosque	Necmeddin Alpı bin Timurtaş of the Artukids	1152-1157 AD (547-552 AH)
Elazığ	Elazığ	Harput Grand Mosque	Fahrettin Karaaslan of the Artukids	1146
Mersin	Mersin	Mersin Ulucami	(Citizens)	1898
Mersin	Tarsus	Tarsus Ulucami	Ibrahim of Ramazanoğlu	1579 (?)
Niğde	Niğde	Niğde Grand Mosque (Alâeddin Mosque)	Beşâre bin Abdullah (Bey of the Seljuks)	1223
Sivas	Divriği	Divriği Grand Mosque	Ahmed of Mengujekids	1228
Sivas	Sivas	Sivas Grand Mosque	Kizilarslan bin İbrâhim	1197
Uşak	Uşak	Uşak Grand Mosque	Mehmed Bey	c.1419 AD
Balıkesir	Balıkesir	Zagan Pasha Mosque	Zagan Pasha	1461
Şırnak	Cizre	Cizre Grand Mosque	Ebü'l-Kāsım Mahmud Sencer Shah	1160
Kayseri	Develi	Develi Grand Mosque (Lower)	Mr Ali	1730
Kayseri	Develi	Develi Grand Mosque (Upper)	Nasrullah, son of Göçer Arslan	1281
Erzurum	Erzurum	Erzurum Grand Mosque	Nasreddin Aslan Mehmed	1179

== See also ==
- List of mosques in Turkey
- List of mosques in Istanbul
- List of mosques in Europe
- List of mosques in Asia
- Lists of mosques
- Islam in Turkey
