= Iplikçi Mosque =

13th-century Seljuk-era mosque in Konya, Turkey

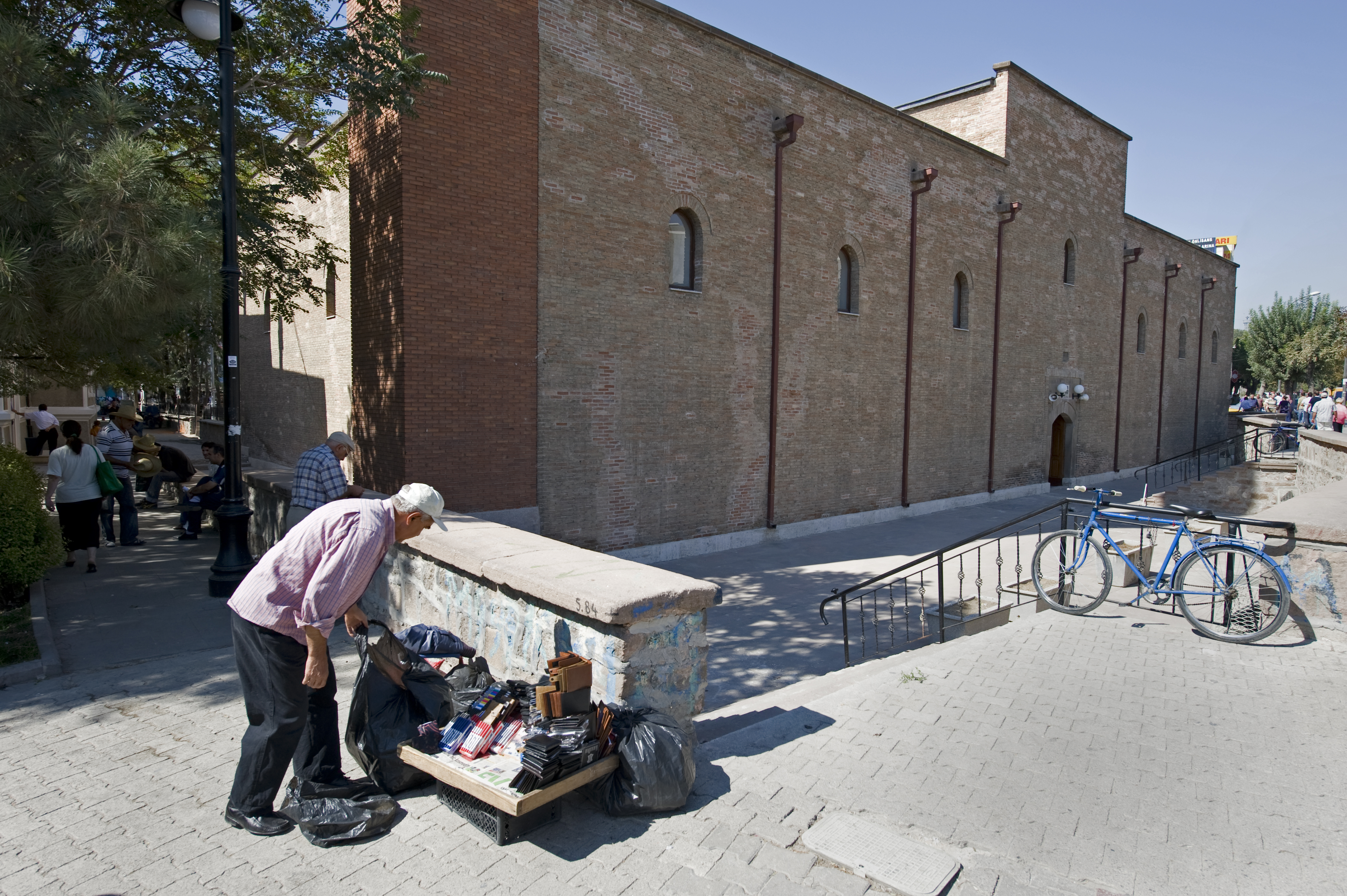

Religion
- Affiliation: Islam

Location
- Location: Konya, Konya Province, Turkey
- Interactive map of Iplikçi Mosque
- Coordinates: 37°52′19″N 32°29′48″E

Architecture
- Style: Seljuk
- Established: 1201–2 AD (598 AH)

The Iplikçi Mosque (Turkish: Iplikçi Camii), also known as Ebülfazl Mosque, is a 13th-century Seljuk-era Islamic Friday mosque built in 1201-2 AD (598 AH) in the city of Konya, Turkey, to the east of Alaeddin Hill (Konya's citadel).

== History ==
The mosque, built in 1201-2 AD (598 AH) to accommodate Friday prayers for the surrounding area, is considered one of the first examples of the mosque layout adopted by the Seljuk Sultanate of Rum in the 13th century. It is also one of just two Seljuk-era mosques in Anatolia built using bricks.

The structure was first named after its builder, Ebü'l-Fazl Abdülcebbâr of Tabriz, and later after İplikçi Necîbüddin Ayaz, a founding trustee of the adjacent Altun-aba Madrasa and eponymous patron of the nearby İplikçiler Çarşısı or bazaar. "Iplikçi" means thread chooser, yarnman or spinner in Turkish.

According to the inscription on its door, the mosque was further expanded by one Mesudzâde Hacı Ebubekir in early April 1333 AD (Ragab 733 AH), and was destroyed by fire and repaired by a Hacı Emrullah, a merchant, before 1584. Although the mosque has been repeatedly rebuilt, its early architectural elements (including traces of its original 13th-century mihrab), charter document and mentions in medieval sources all make it historically important.

The present-day mihrab is decorated in a baroque 19th-century style, but the remains of the original Seljuk-era mihrab are visible on the floor beneath it and are the oldest extant example of Anatolian Seljuk art – a geometric mosaic of turquoise and purple tiles, and a second composition with turquoise and dark blue tiles.

The building took its present shape in 1945 following restoration by the Museums Directorate. It was put into service as the Classical Works Department of the Konya Museum in 1951 before being reopened as a mosque in February 1960.

== Architecture ==
The mosque's floorplan measures approximately 30 metres by 40 metres and consists of seven arched naves running perpendicular to the mihrab wall and three transverse corridors, with a roof consisting of three by seven domes supported by arches.

The roof over the first two naves is supported by cross vaults, while the roof over the third nave (adjacent to the mihrab) rests on barrel vaults. The three domes supporting the roof from the central main door of the mosque to the mihrab are rare Seljuk examples of oval-shaped domes.

Photography from around the year 1900 shows that the mosque still had a domed roof and a short, stubby minaret at this time, revealing that the current façade walls and minaret were raised significantly at some point in the intervening period.

The structural relationship between the mosque and the formally adjacent Altun-aba Madrasa is unclear. An excavation carried out during the structure's repair in 1939 revealed traces of an arch in the wall of the mosque that may have belonged to the madrasa, but the foundations also showed evidence of an old minaret in front of the south wall that could suggest the arch belonged to the first mosque.

== Gallery ==
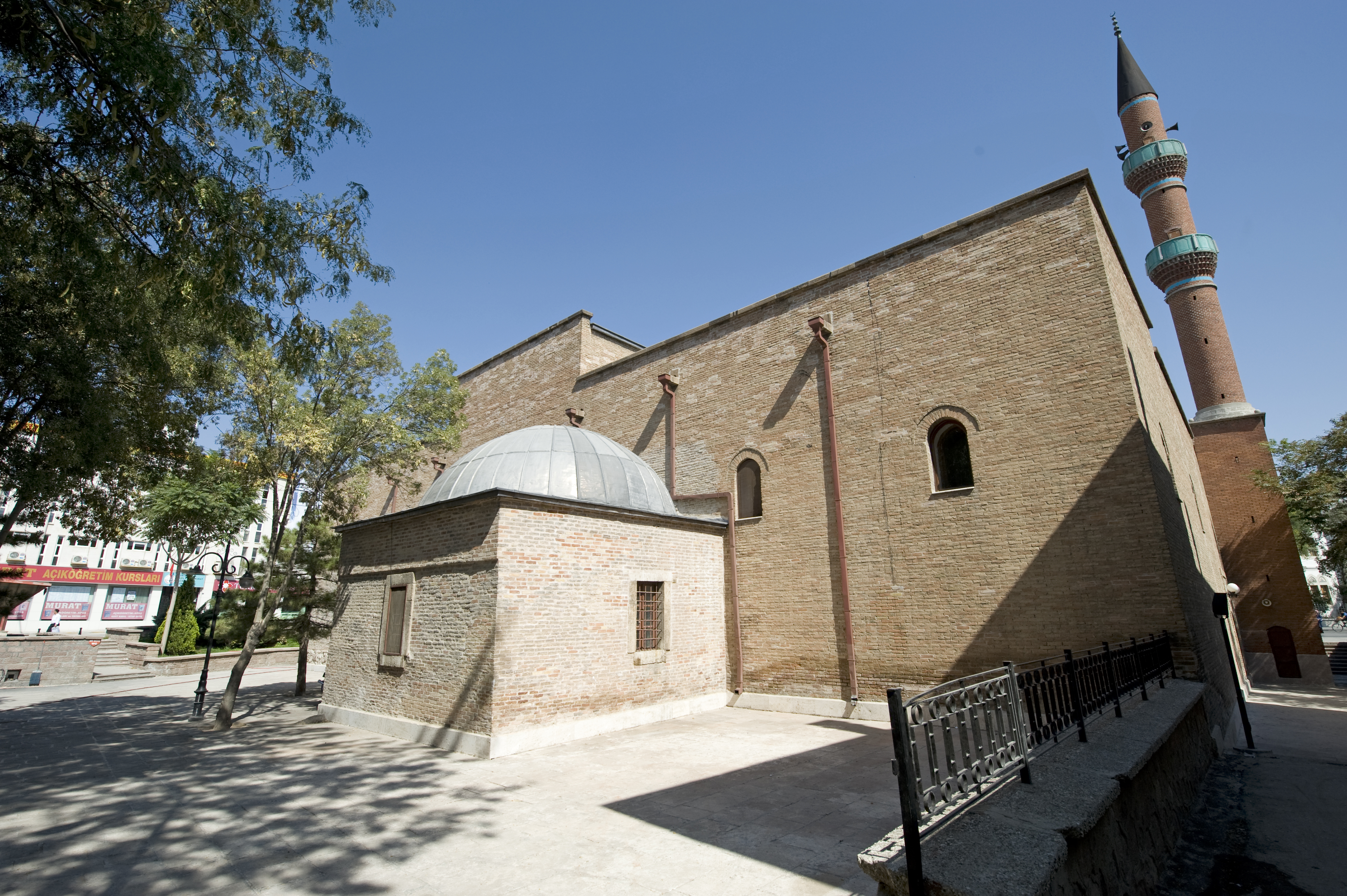
Rear view

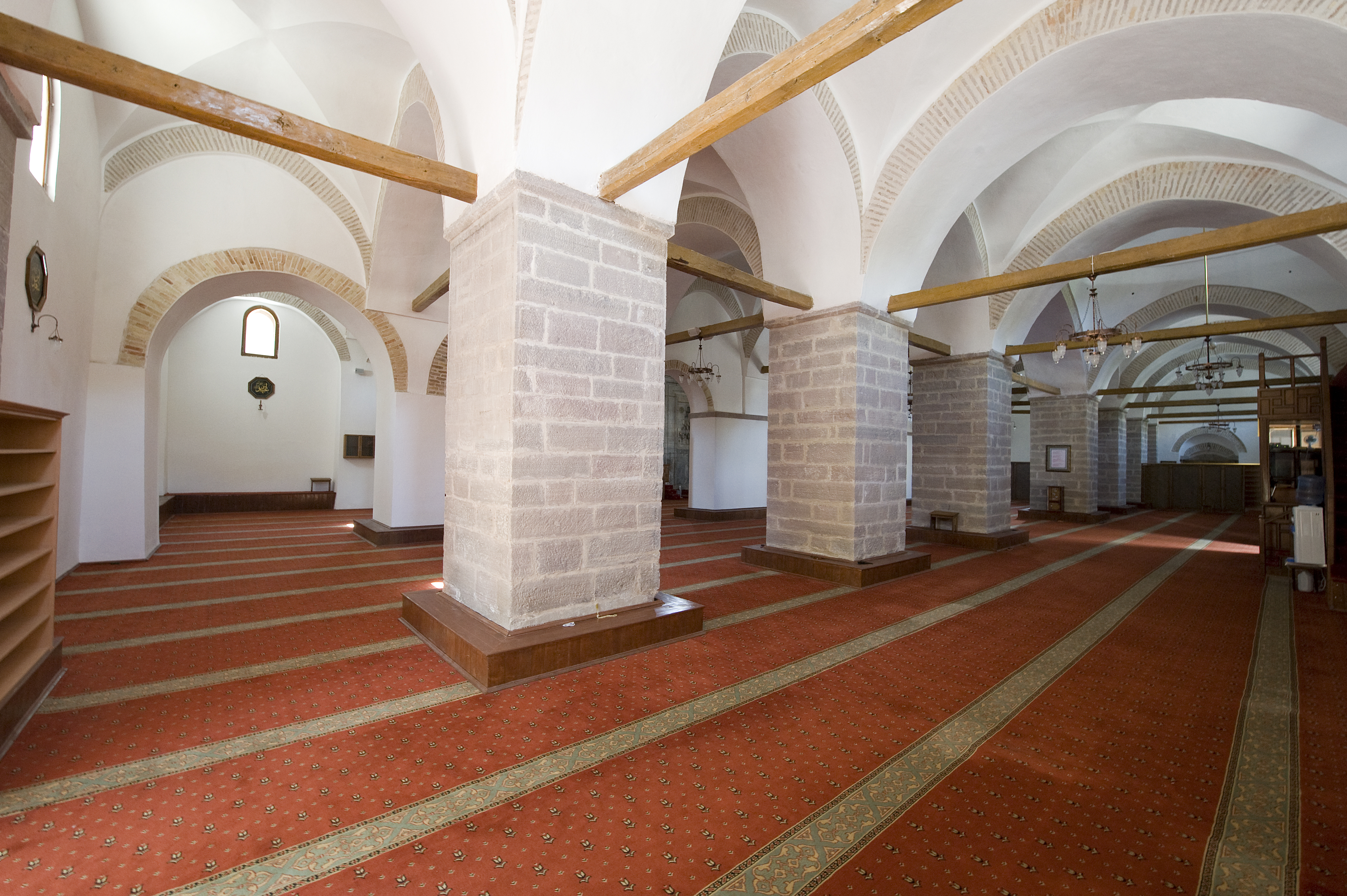
Interior view

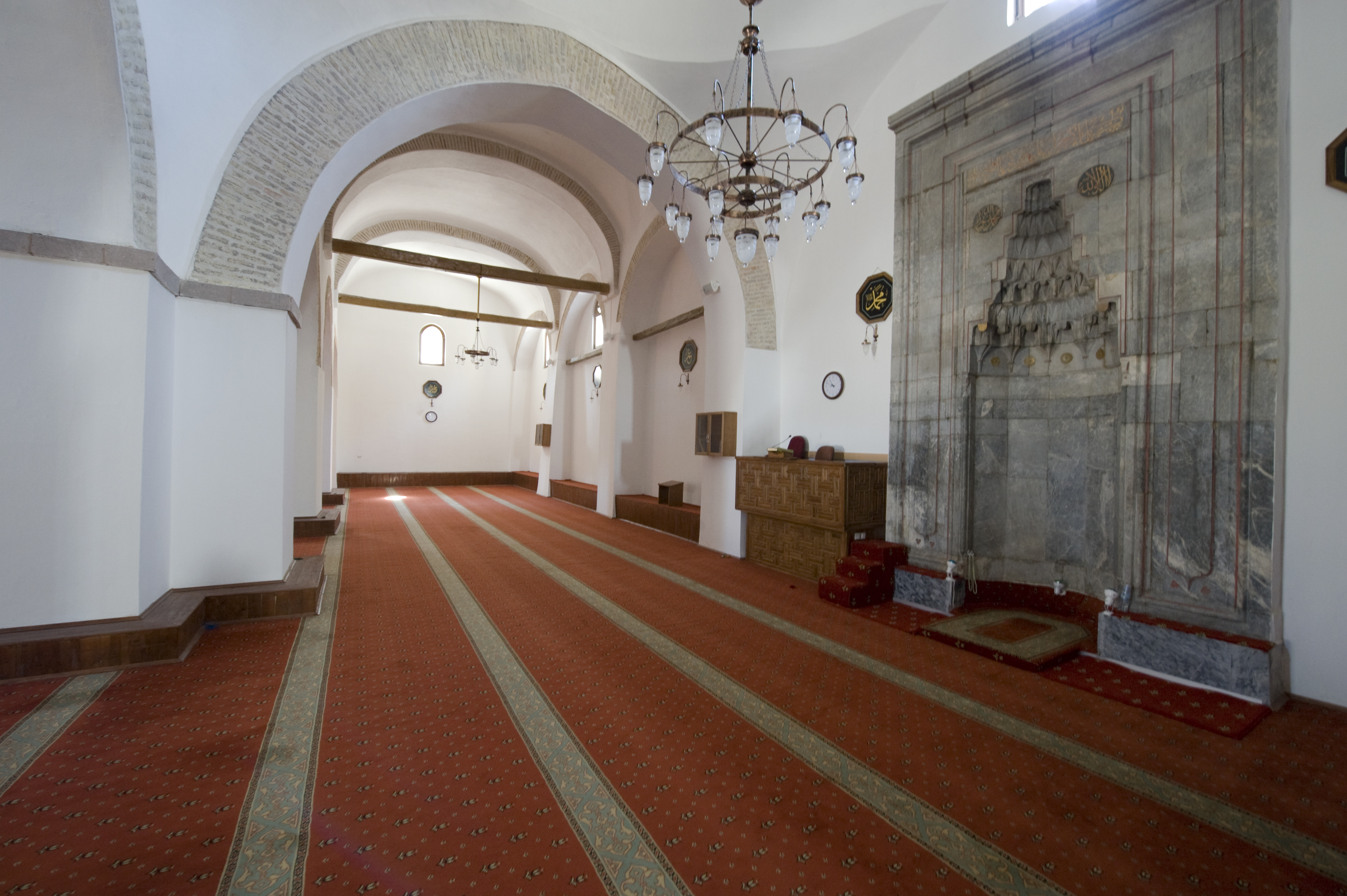
View of the mihrab

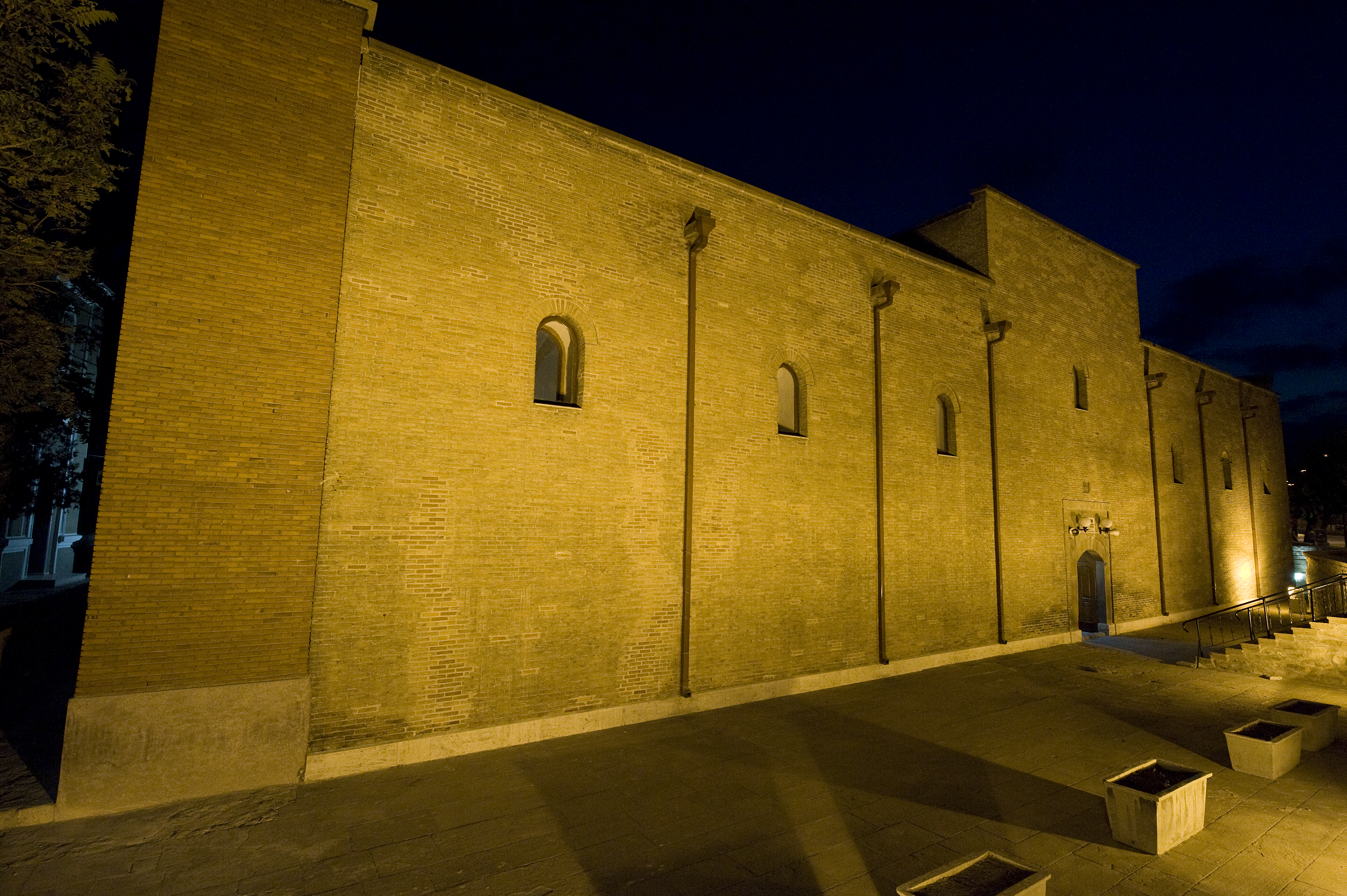
Front lit up at night

== See also ==
- List of mosques in Turkey
- List of Turkish Grand Mosques
