= Küre District =

District of Kastamonu Province, Turkey

- District
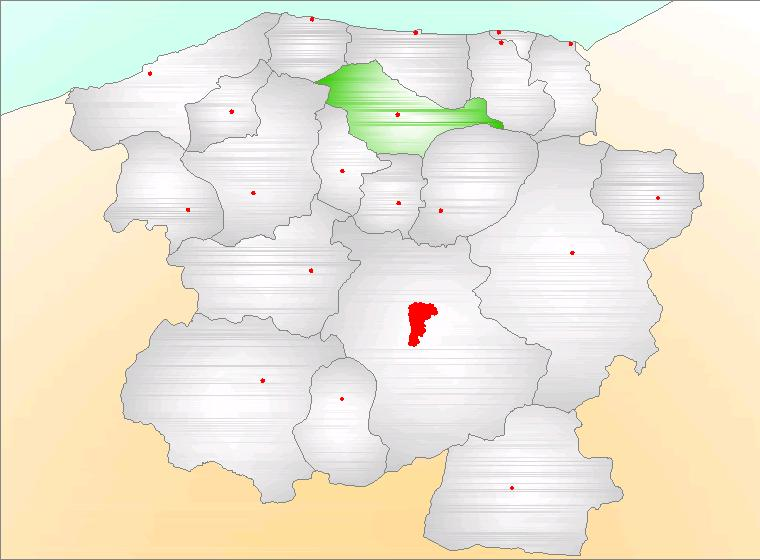
- Map showing Küre District (green) in Kastamonu Province

- Location in Turkey
- Coordinates: 41°48′N 33°43′E
- Country: Turkey
- Province: Kastamonu
- Seat: Küre

Government
  - Kaymakam: Abdulkadir Işık
- Area: 406 km^{2} (157 sq mi)
- Population (2021): 5,431
  - Density: 13/km^{2} (35/sq mi)
- Time zone: UTC+3 (TRT)
- Website: www.kure.gov.tr

Küre District is a district of the Kastamonu Province of Turkey. Its seat is the town of Küre. Its area is 406 km^{2}, and its population is 5,431 (2021).

== Composition ==
There is one municipality in Küre District:

- Küre

There are 34 villages in Küre District:

- Afşargüney
- Afşarimam
- Ahmetbeşe
- Alacık
- Avcıpınar
- Belören
- Beşören
- Beyalan
- Bürüm
- Cambaz
- Camili
- Çatak
- Çatköy
- Çaybükü
- Ersizler
- Ersizlerdede
- Güllüce
- Güneyköy
- İğdir
- İkizciler
- İmralı
- Karadonu
- Karaman
- Kayadibi
- Kesepınar
- Koyunkırtık
- Kozköy
- Kösreli
- Köstekçiler
- Sarpun
- Sipahiler
- Taşpınar
- Topçu
- Uzunöz
