= Grand Mosque of Akşehir =

13th-century Seljuk-era mosque in Western Turkey

Akşehir Grand Mosque
- Akşehir Ulucami
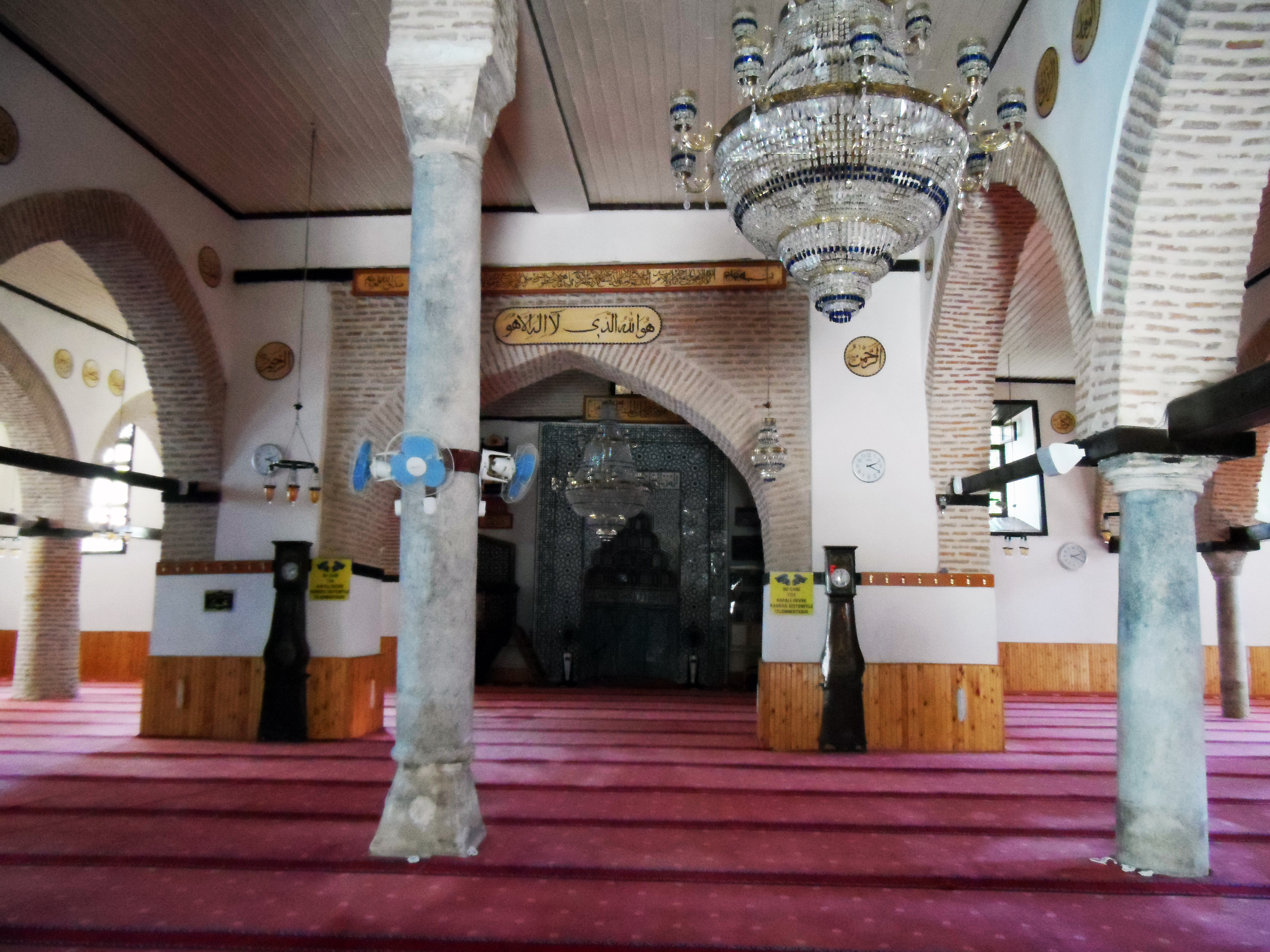

- Location within Turkey

Religion
- Affiliation: Islam
- District: Akşehir
- Province: Konya Province
- Region: Central Anatolia
- Rite: Sunni Islam
- Status: Active

Location
- Location: Dudukadın Street, Akşehir
- Coordinates: 38°21′22″N 31°24′42″E

Architecture
- Type: Mosque
- Groundbreaking: 1213

Specifications
- Length: 30 m (98 ft)
- Width: 40 m (130 ft)
- Minaret: 1

Akşehir Grand Mosque (Turkish: Akşehir Ulucami) is a historical mosque in Akşehir, Turkey.

== Location ==
The mosque is in Akşehir ilçe (district) of Konya Province at 38°21′22″N 31°24′42″E on Dudukadın Street. It faces Akşehir Museum.

== History ==
The exact date of construction is not known, though according to the inscription on the minaret base, it must be in 1213 or earlier. The commissioner of the minaret was Ebu Said İbrahim. This date coincides with the reign of Kaykaus I (r. 1211–1220) in the Sultanate of Rum. During the reign of Kayqubad I (r. 1220–1237) of Seljuıks the mosque was enlarged. The ceramic-tiled mihrab was added later, probably in the 15th century, while both the water fountain on the north wall and the shadirvan in the yard were added in the 19th century during the Ottoman Empire. According to the inscription of the fountain it was commissioned by Yaralı Yusuf of Cihanbeyli in 1811.

== The building ==
The rectangular ground area of the mosque including the yard and excluding the minaret is about 1,200 m^{2} (13,000 sq ft). The ground area of the minaret located at the north east is 4.8 m^{2} (52 sq ft). Cut stone and rubble stone was used in the construction of the mosque.

== Gallery ==
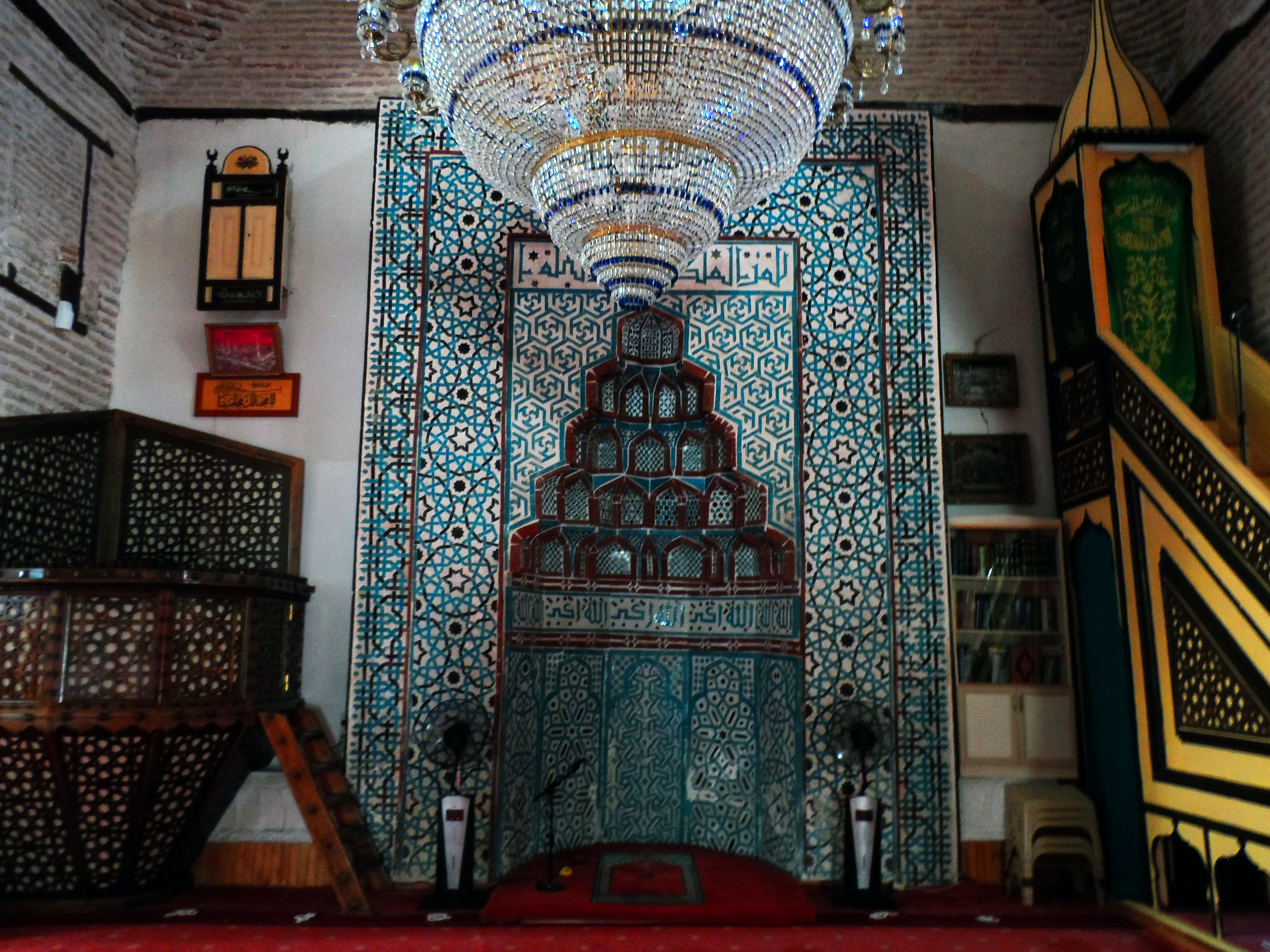
Mihrab

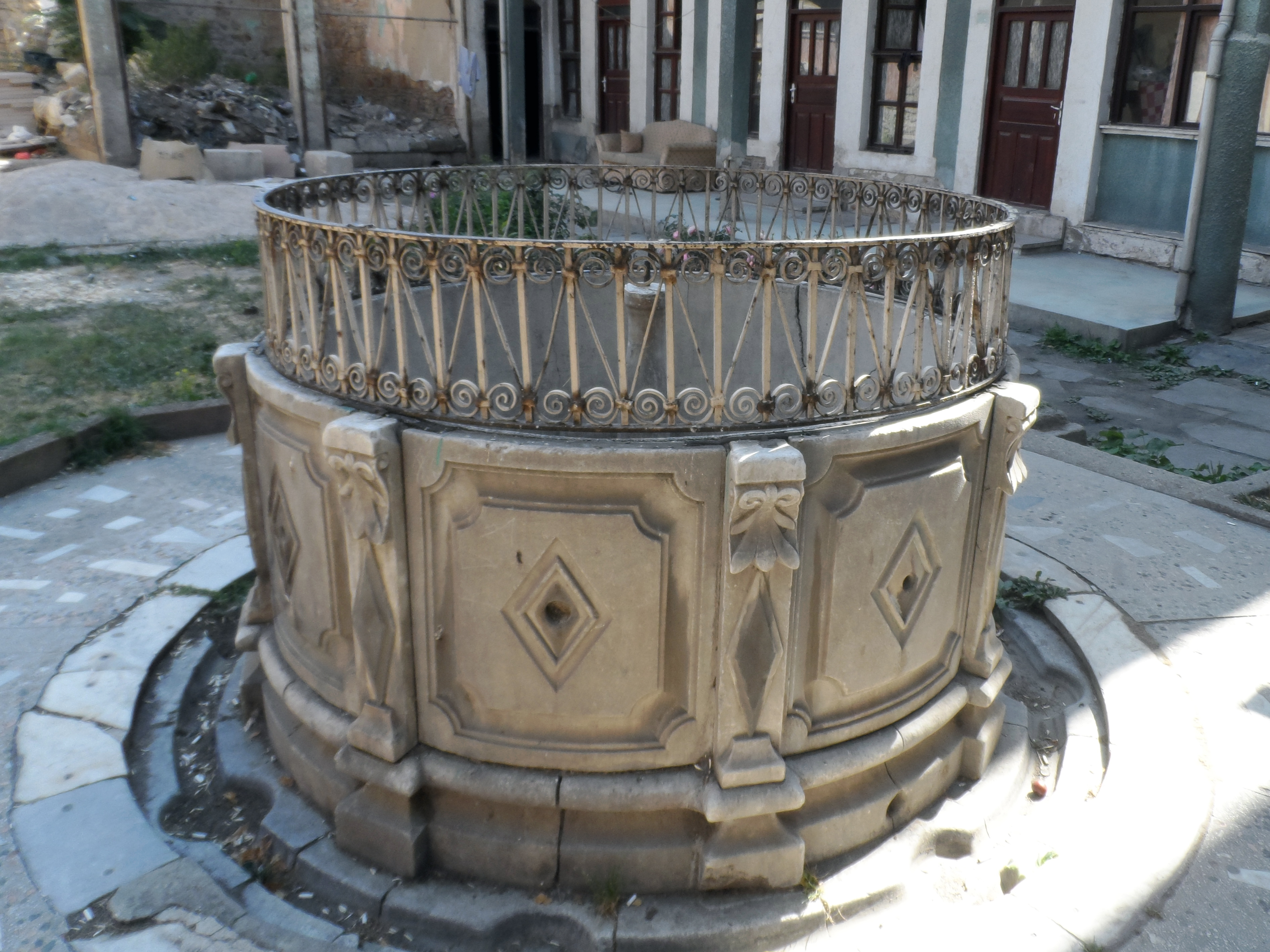
Shadirvan

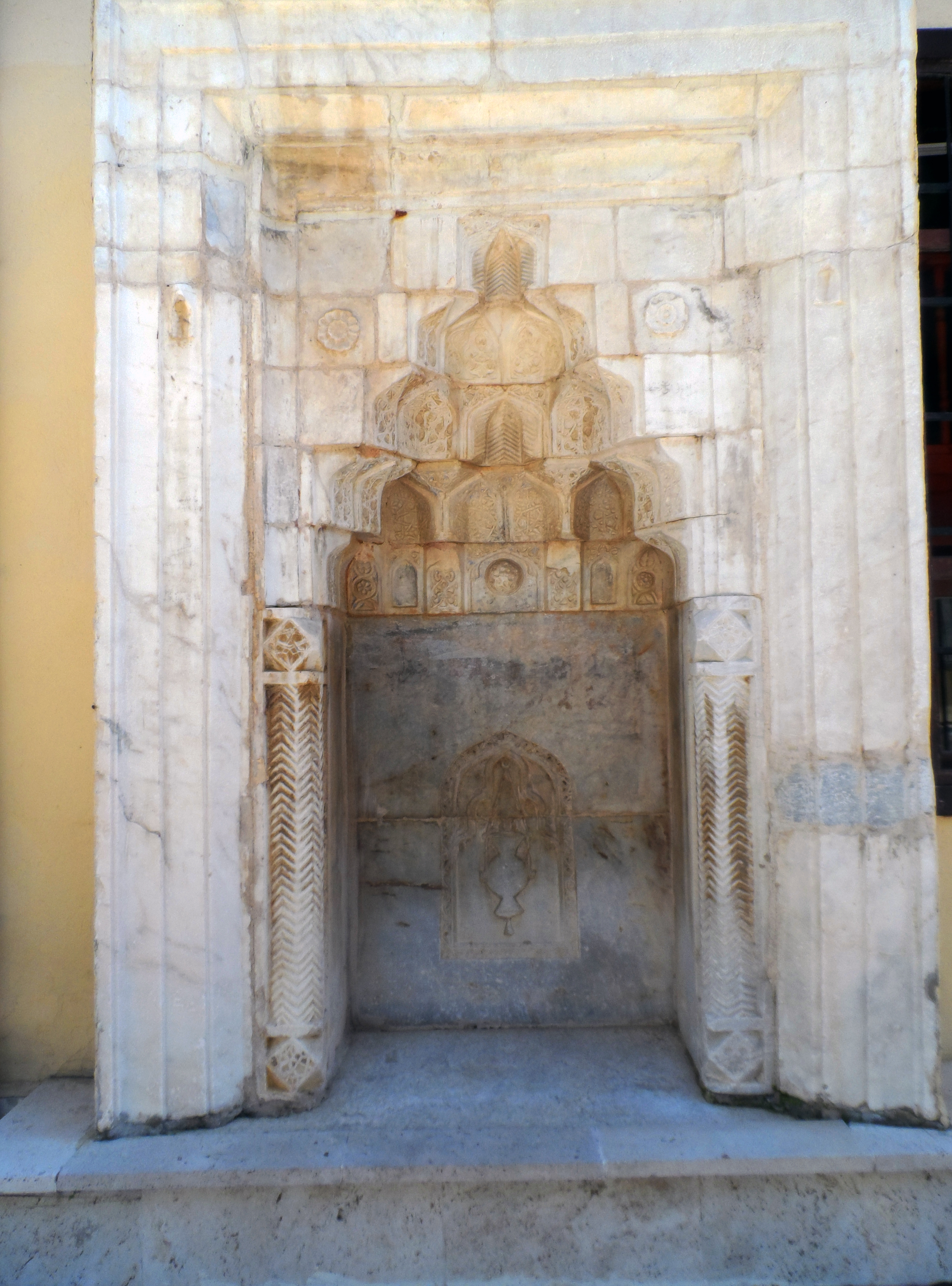
Fountain

== See also ==
- List of Turkish Grand Mosques
