= Great Mosque of Malatya =

Mosque in Battalgazi, Malatya, Turkey

- Malatya Ulu Camii
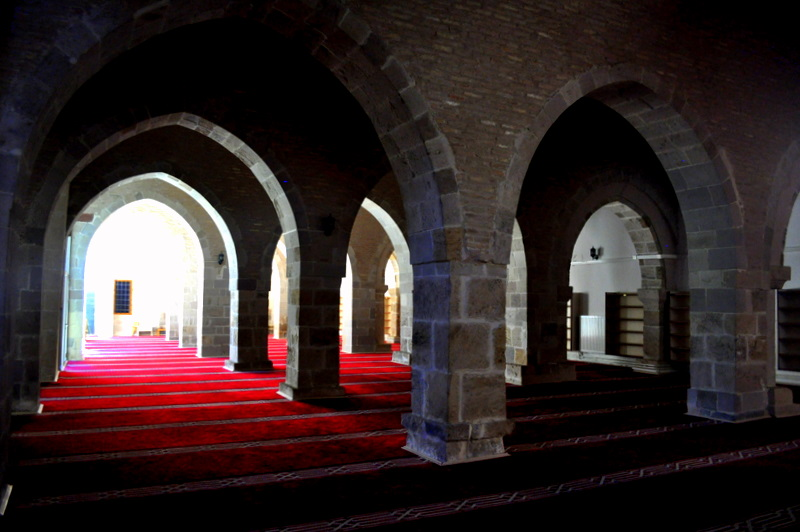

- Location within Turkey

Religion
- Affiliation: Islam

Location
- Municipality: Battalgazi
- State: Malatya
- Country: Turkey
- Interactive map of Great Mosque of Malatya
- Coordinates: 38.4205°N 38.3668°E

Architecture
- Type: mosque
- Established: 13th century
- Destroyed: 6 February 2023

The Great Mosque of Malatya (Turkish: Malatya Ulu Camii) was a Seljuk mosque in Battalgazi, Malatya Province, Turkey. The mosque was originally built in the 13th century, and was destroyed in the 2023 Turkey–Syria earthquake.

== See also ==
- List of Turkish Grand Mosques
