= Uşak Grand Mosque =

15th-century Anatolian beylik-era mosque in western Turkey

- Uşak Ulu Camii
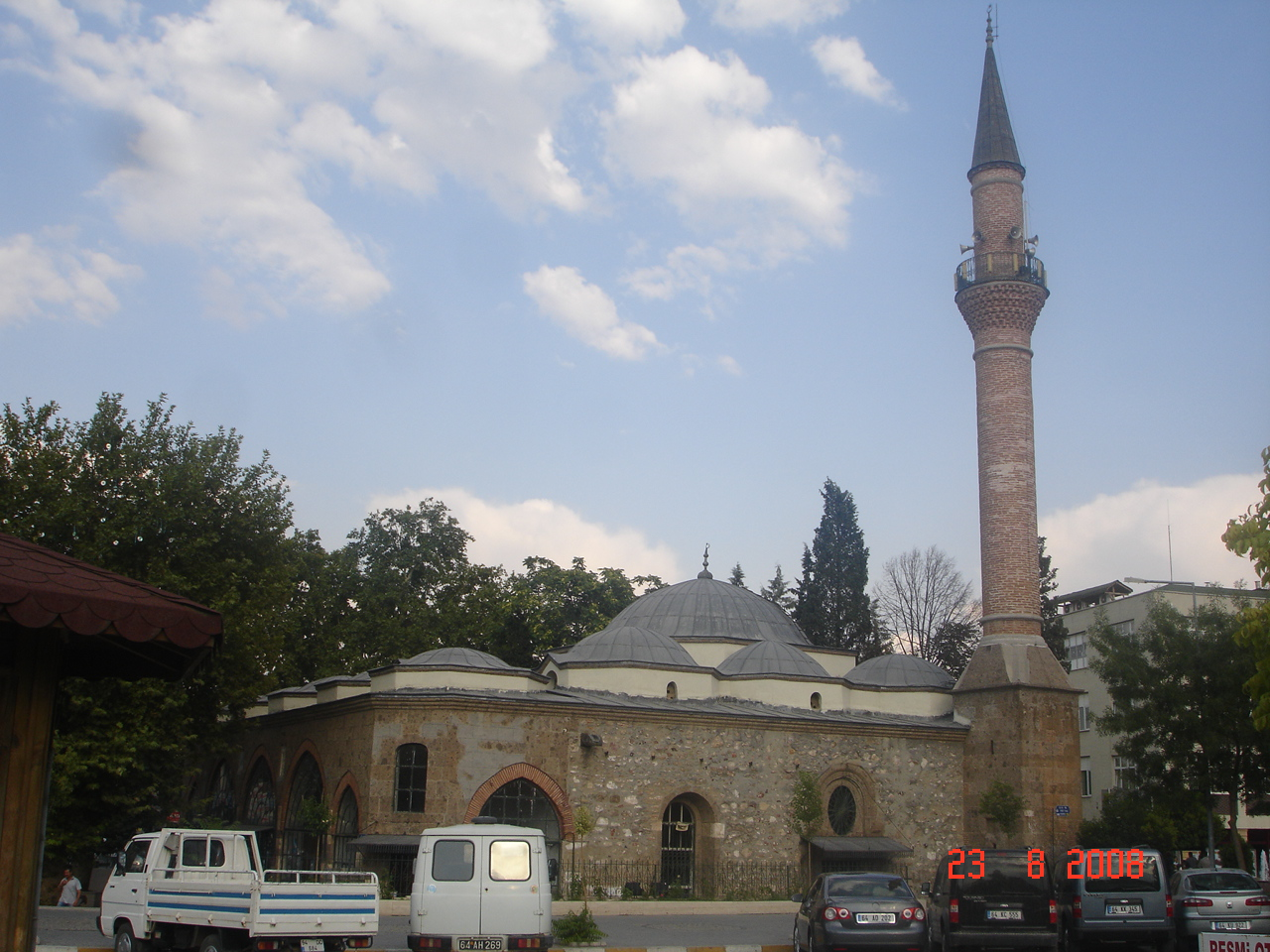

- Location of the mosque in Turkey

Religion
- Affiliation: Sunni Islam
- District: Central
- Province: Uşak

Location
- Country: Turkey
- Interactive map of Uşak Grand Mosque
- Coordinates: 38°40′47″N 29°24′17″E

Architecture
- Completed: 15th century

Specifications
- Dome: 1 main + 2 x 3 side
- Dome dia. (outer): 10 m (33 ft)
- Minaret: 1
- Materials: Stone

Uşak Grand Mosque (Turkish: Uşak Ulu Camii) is a historic mosque in Uşak City, Uşak Province, Turkey.

The Grand Mosque is situated in the center of Uşak.

== History ==
Although its construction year is unknown, the architectural characteristics indicate that it was built during the Germiyanids era. An inscription in thuluth calligraphy of Arabic scriptplaced above the mosque's entrance is related to a fountain and has so nothing to do with the mosque. According to the inscription Yakup II of Germiyan (reigned 1402–1429) built the fountain and brought water in AH 822 (1419). It is considered that the inscription was relocated during restoration works.

== Architecture ==
The mosque underwent a major architectural change in the 19th century. It was decorated in the Ottoman Imperial architectural style and a narthex was added. The mosque is constructed in ashlar. A graveyard is situated east of the mosque. The courtyard, which is at a lower level in relation to the road, is paved with stone. The narthex has three gates, and is topped by five domes on octagonal base supported by thick stone columns carrying pointed arches. In the later time, a glass wall was constructed in front of the columns so that they remain behind.

The rectangular-formed prayer hall has the dimensions 18.50 m × 22 m (60.7 ft × 72.2 ft). The main dome has a diameter of 10 m (33 ft), and is flanked on both sides by three smaller domes. The stone-carved mihrab widely lost its originality after it was decorated in the Ottoman Imperial architectural style. Some parts of the original minbar were affixed to the new one.

Although a unique building, Uşak Grand Mosque has interesting similarities of architectural plan with Old Mosque, Edirne, Great Mosque of Sofia and Dzhumaya Mosque in Plovdiv. The cylindrical minaret rises up upon a base, which is as high as the mosque's wall, and has one gallery.

The mosque was closed to worship for restoration purposes for a period of ten months in August 2015.

== See also ==
- List of Turkish Grand Mosques
