= Ermenek Grand Mosque =

14th-century Karamanid-era mosque in Ermenek, Turkey

- Ermenek Ulucamii
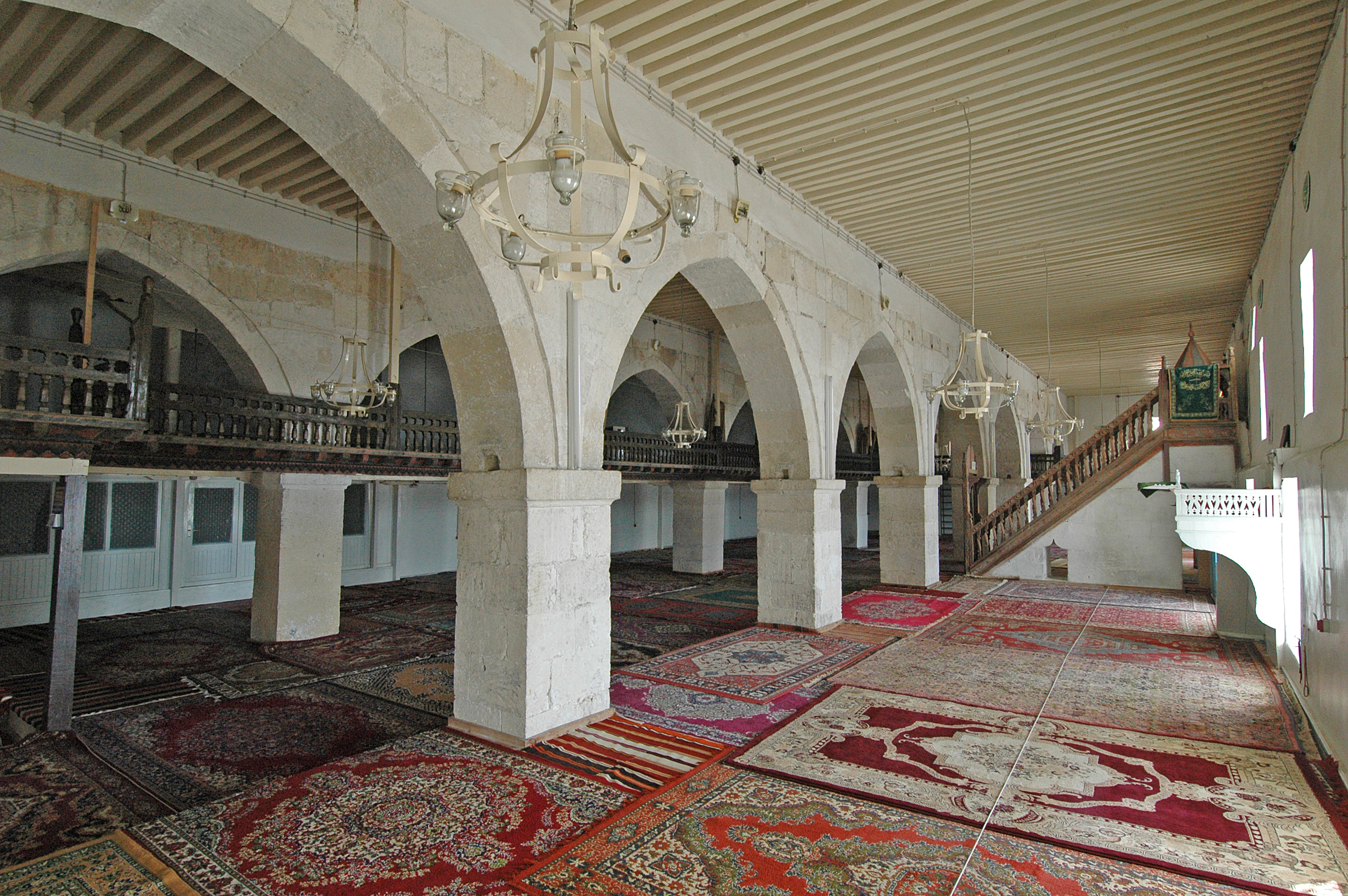
- Interior view showing the three naves

Religion
- Affiliation: Islam

Location
- Location: Ermenek, Karaman Province, Turkey
- Interactive map of Ermenek Grand Mosque

Architecture
- Style: Karamanid
- Funded by: Mahmud Bey
- Established: 1302AD (702AH)

Ermenek Grand Mosque (Turkish: Ermenek Ulucamii) is located on the outskirts of Ermenek Castle on an outcrop that overlooks the city of Ermenek. The mosque was built by Mahmud Bey of the Karamanids in 1302AD (702AH), as inscribed in Sülüs-style calligraphy on the original door wings between the antechamber and the prayer hall.

These 14th-century Karamind-era wooden door wings have since been removed for preservation and posterity and are exhibited at the Sahip Ata Museum in Konya.

From an architectural perspective, the mosque consists of a rectangular hypostyle (pillar-supported) prayer hall with three transverse arched naves extending from west to east, and is the first example of a Turkish mosque with a narthex gallery, a form of antechamber, between the outer doors and the prayer hall. The structure is unusual in not having its main entrance and narthex to the north of the mosque (opposite the mihrab to the south), but to its west.

Several times throughout its history the mosque was altered through renovations and repair work, including expansion works in 950AD, repairs in 1125AD and 1324AD, and other changes and repairs during the Ottoman period. The mosque also now has a wooden minaret that was added later.

== Gallery ==
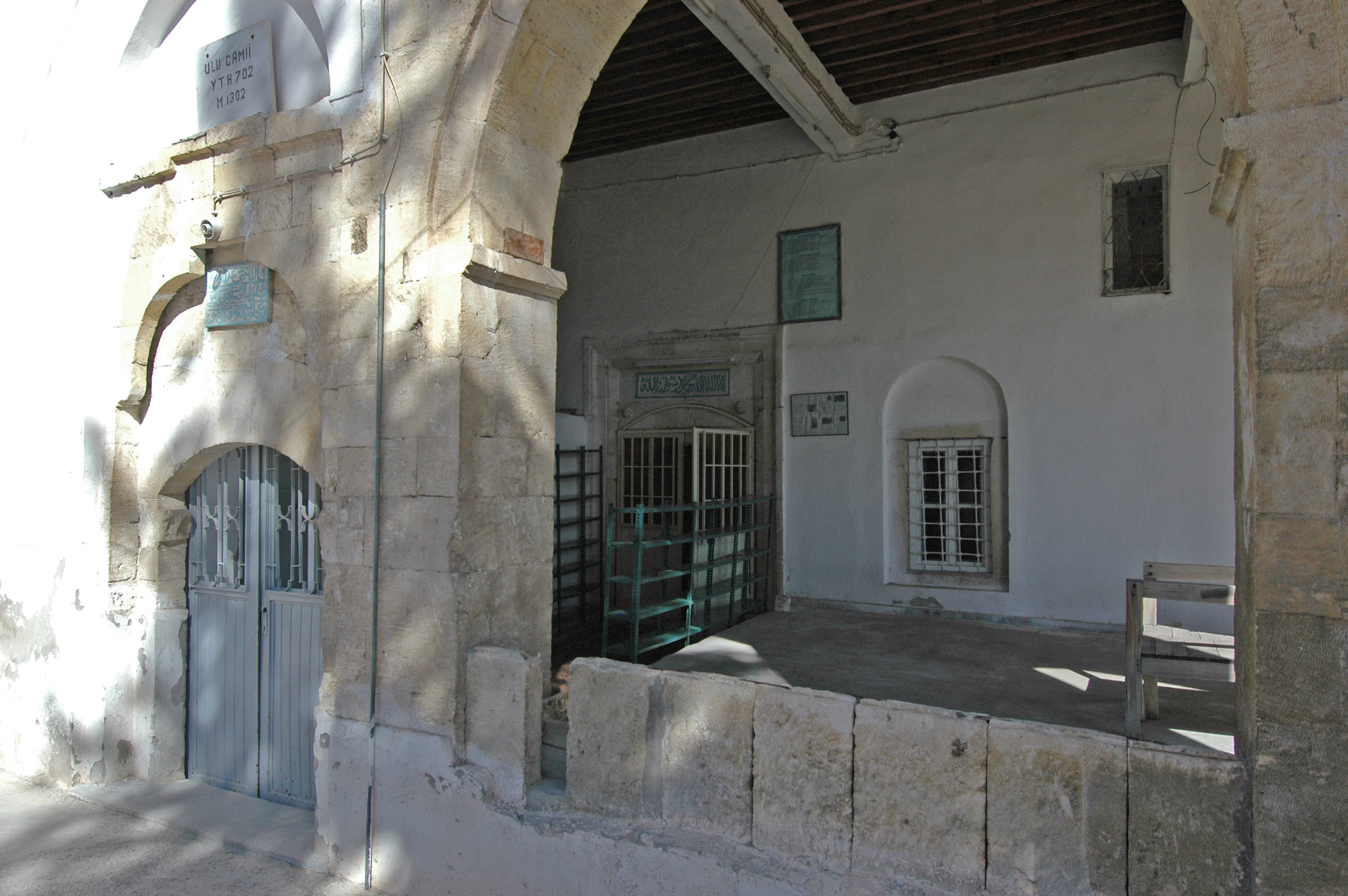
Front view of the mosque and its narthex

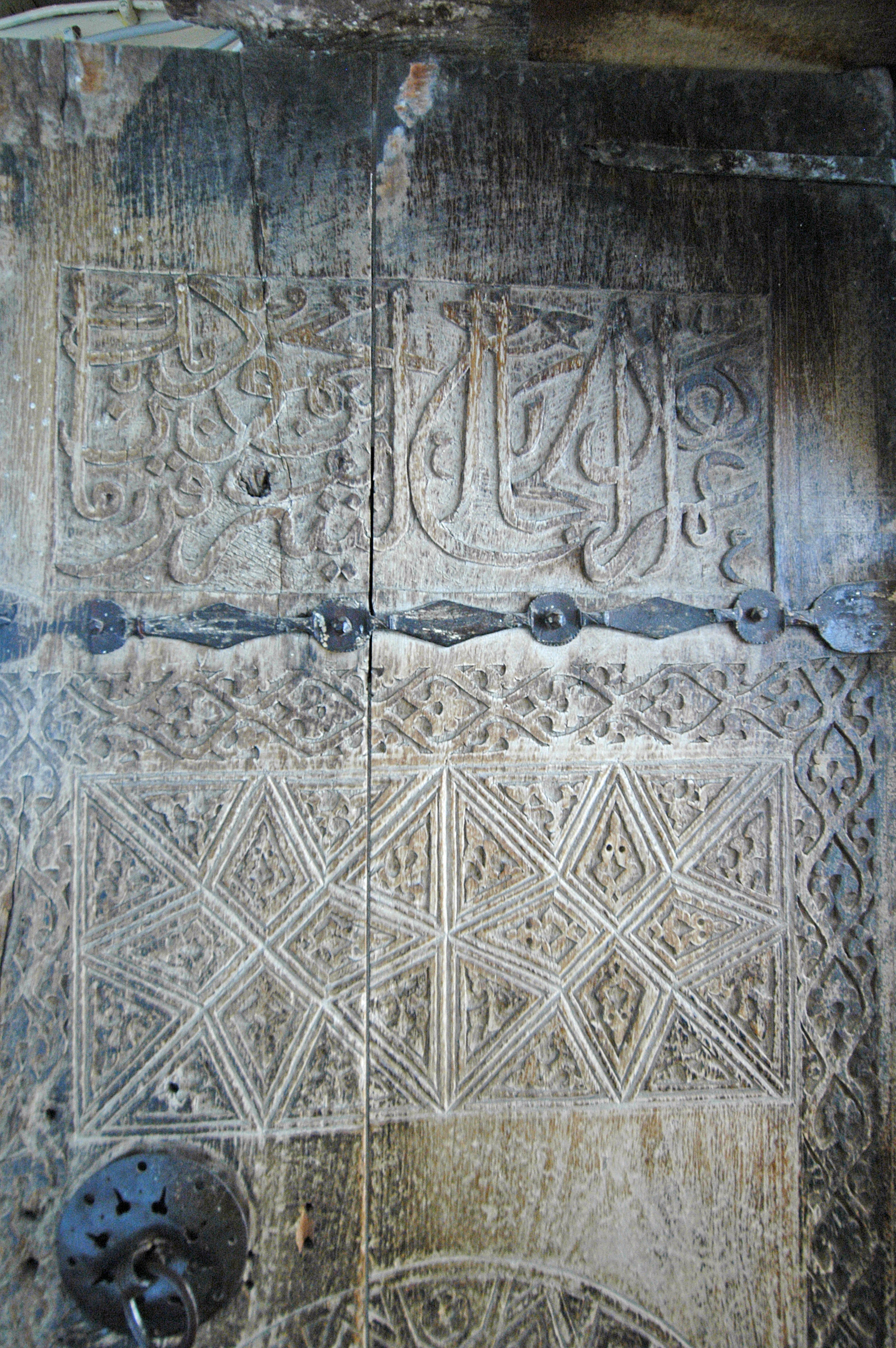
Calligraphy on a door within the mosque

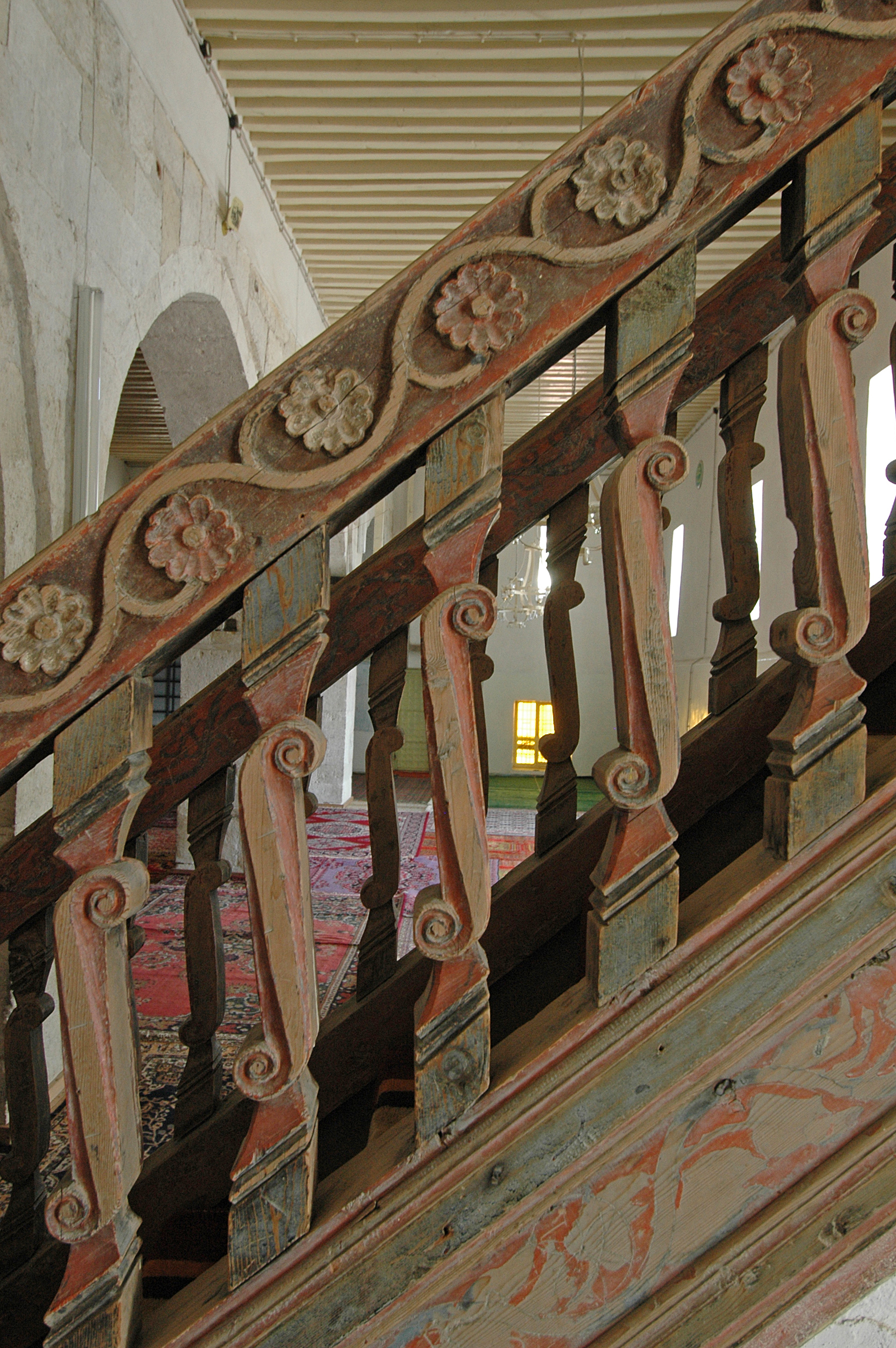
Detail on the wooden minbar

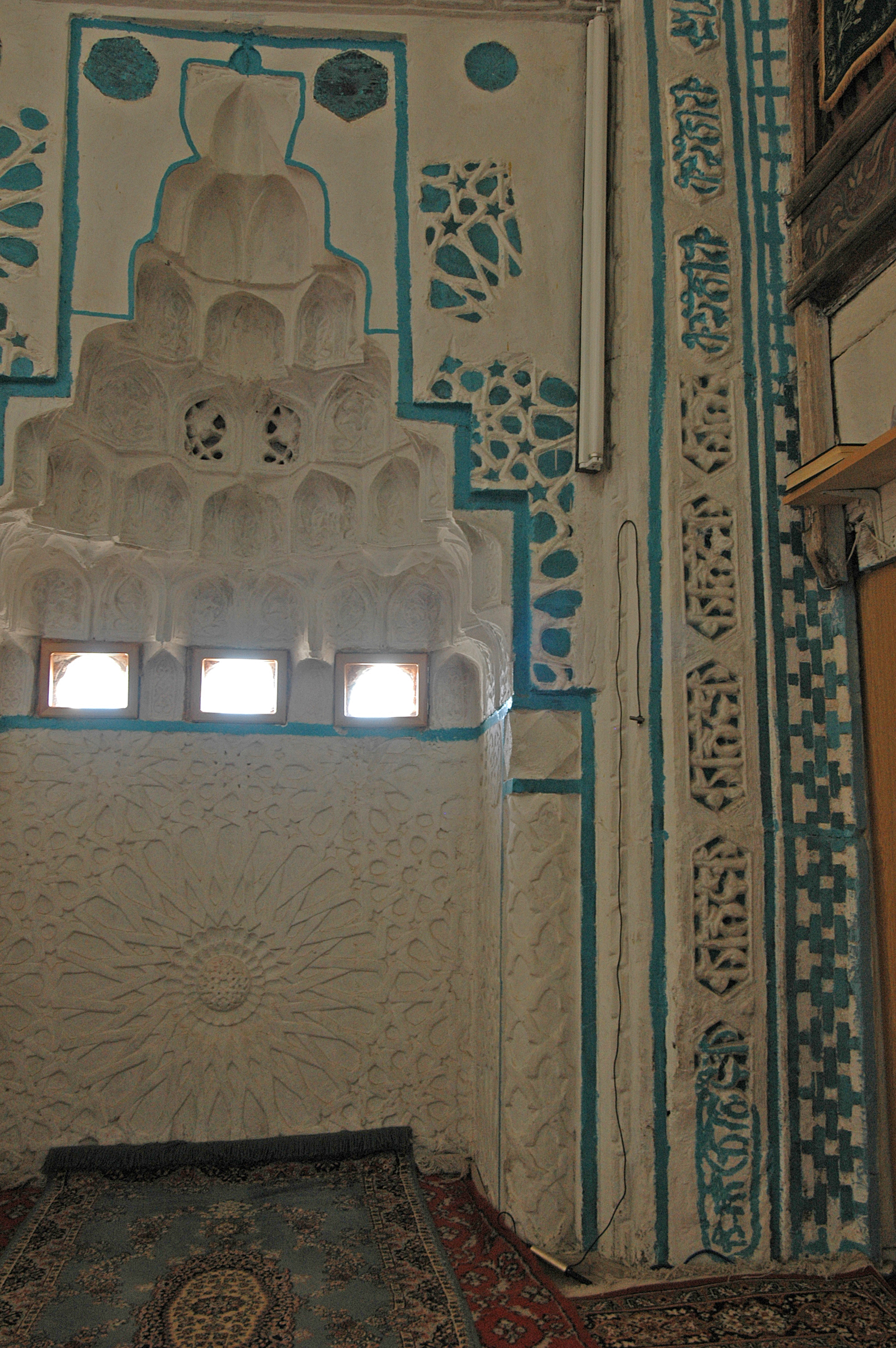
A prayer alcover or mihrab

== See also ==
- List of mosques in Turkey
- List of Turkish Grand Mosques
