= Grand Mosque of Mersin =

Mosque in Mersin, Turkey

Mersin Grand Mosque
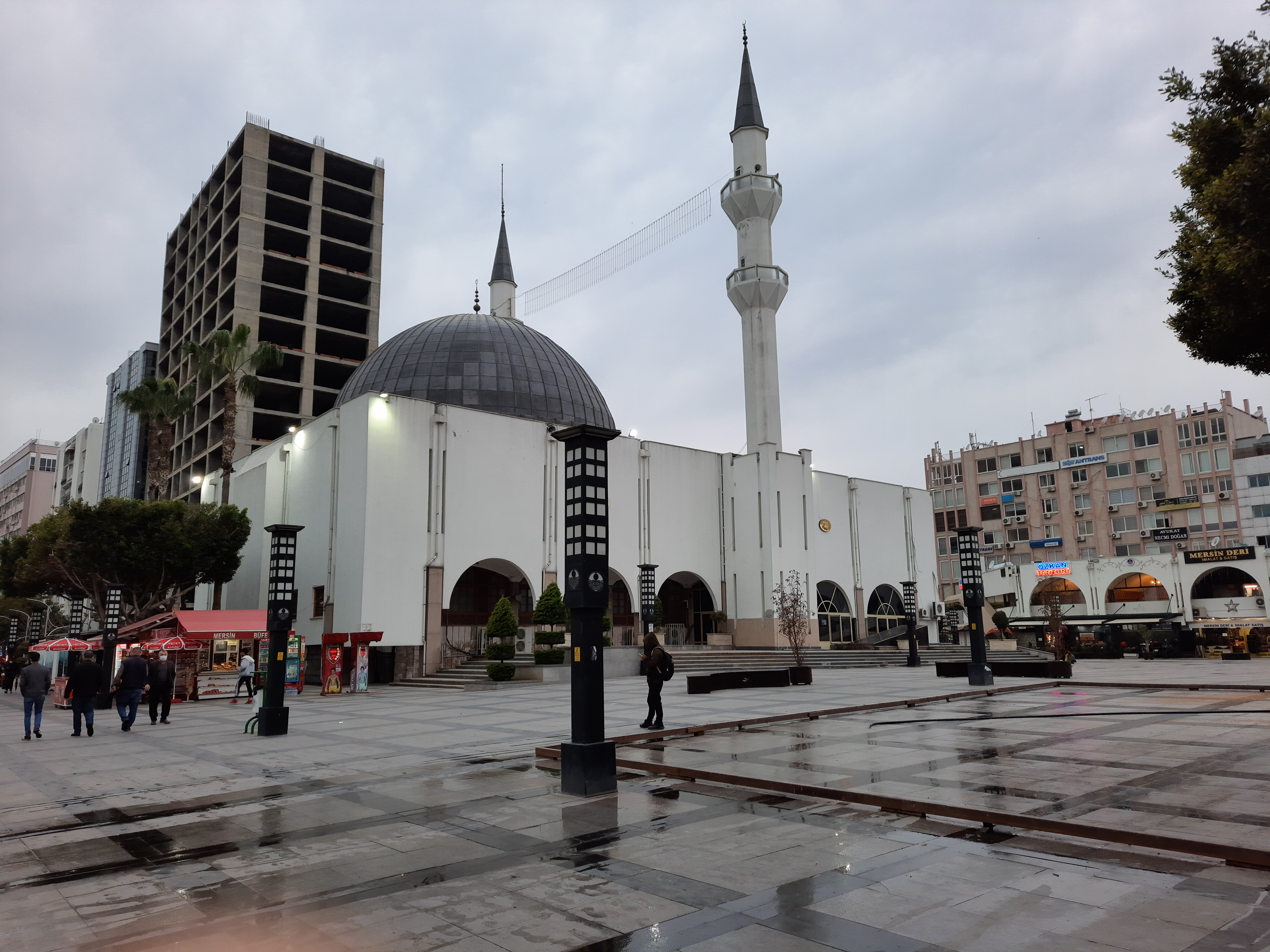

- Location within Turkey

Religion
- Affiliation: Islam
- Province: Mersin Province
- Region: Mediterranean Region
- Rite: Sunni Islam
- Status: Active

Location
- Location: Mersin, Turkey
- Coordinates: 36.796838°N 34.629618°E

Architecture
- Type: Mosque
- Completed: 1898 (original)-1979 (rebuilt)
- Capacity: 3000

Mersin Grand Mosque (Turkish: Mersin Ulucami) is a Grand Mosque in Mersin, Turkey.

== History ==
The original mosque, then named Yeni Cami (Turkish: New Mosque), was built in 1898 by the leading people (like Abdülkadir Seydavi) of Mersin. In the 1970s, the mosque has been rebuilt and was renamed Ulucami.

== The building ==
The mosque is in Akdeniz secondary municipality of Mersin (Central Mersin). It is at the intersection of the main streets. Atatürk Park is to the south and business quarter of the city is to the north and west. The square ground area of the mosque is about 6,400 square metres (69,000 sq ft) The mosque shares this area with a small shopping area named Ulu Çarşı. The parking area is below the basement. It is a three-storey mosque. The prayer section for 3000 people and nartex is at the ground floor. The conference room for 400 people and Youth center is at the basement. There are two minarets one at the east and one at the west. Each minaret has two şerefes (minaret balconies).

== See also ==
- List of Turkish Grand Mosques
