= Küre, Kastamonu =

Küre
- Municipality
- Location within Turkey
- Coordinates: 41°48′20″N 33°42′38″E
- Country: Turkey
- Province: Kastamonu
- District: Küre

Government
  - Mayor: Salih Turan (AKP)
- Elevation: 1,020 m (3,350 ft)
- Population (2021): 2,522
- Time zone: UTC+3 (TRT)
- Area code: 0366
- Climate: Cfb
- Website: www.kure.bel.tr

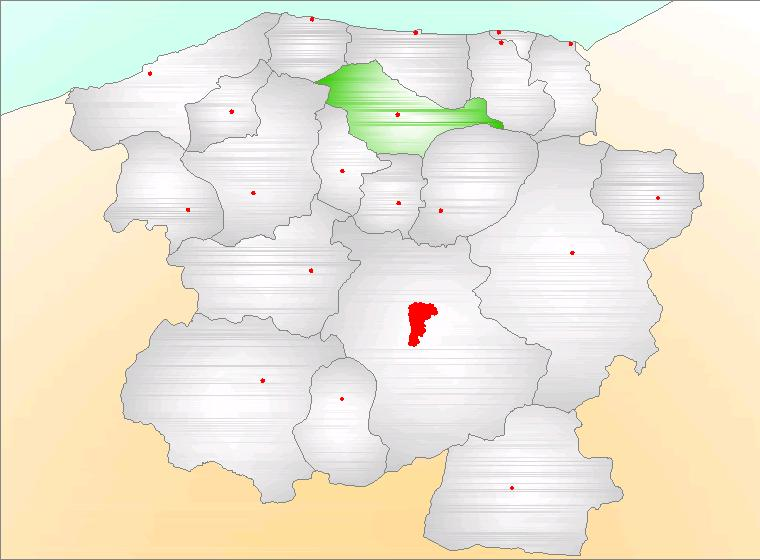
Küre district of Kastamonu, Province of Turkey

Küre is a town in the Kastamonu Province in the Black Sea region of Turkey. It is the seat of Küre District. Its population is 2,522 (2021). The town lies at an elevation of 1,020 m (3,346 ft).

== Geography ==
It is a small forest town. It was established in a valley between two mountains, at an altitude of approximately 1,500 m. It is on the Kastamonu - Inebolu road. It is 60 km from Kastamonu and 30 km from Inebolu . The main source of income of the people is the copper mine operation in the district and forestry .
