= Grand Mosque of Urfa =

Mosque in Urfa, Turkey

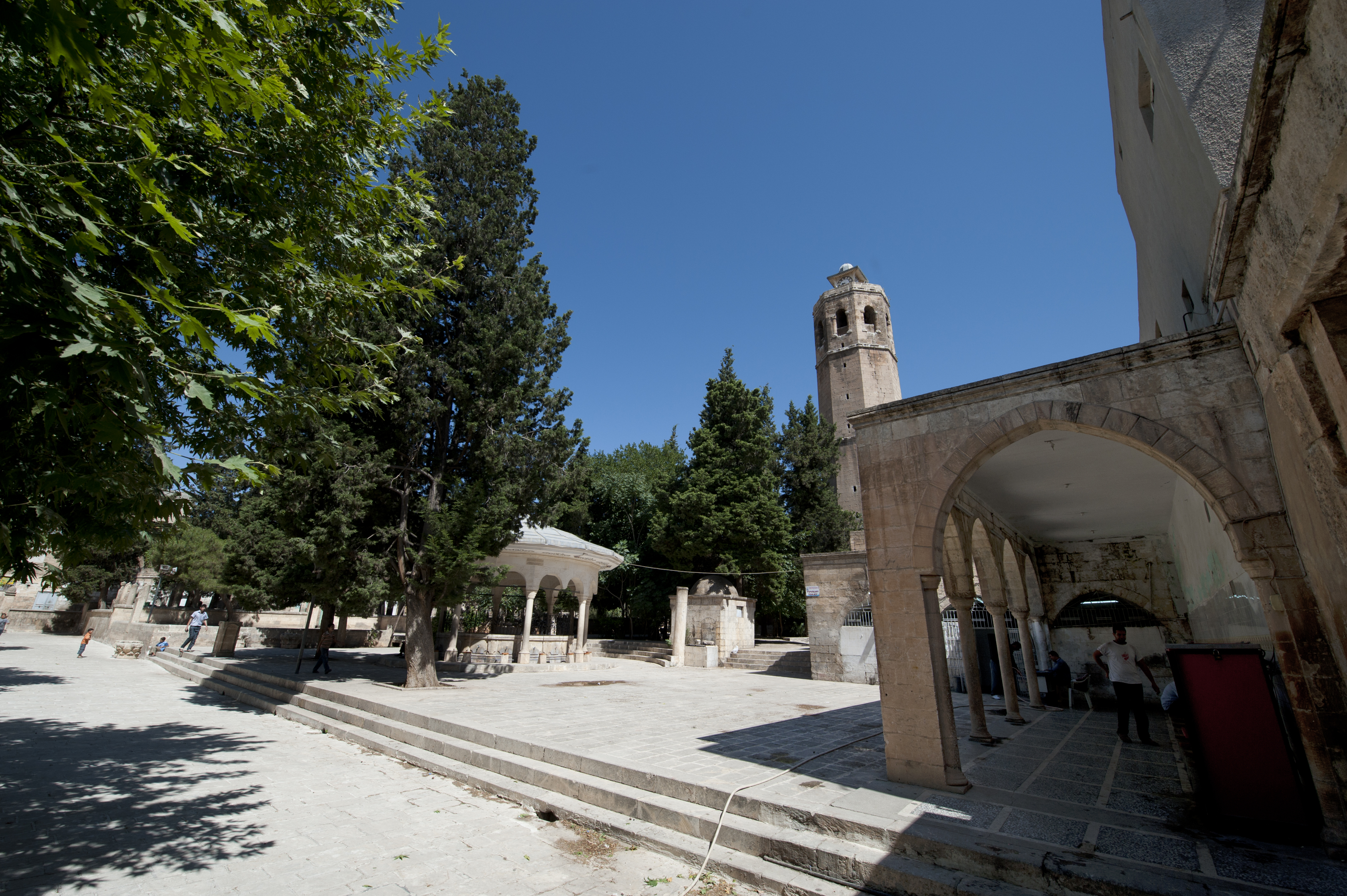

Religion
- Affiliation: Islam

Location
- Municipality: Urfa
- Country: Turkey
- Interactive map of Grand Mosque of Urfa
- Coordinates: 37°09′04″N 38°47′24″E

Architecture
- Type: mosque

The 12th-century Grand Mosque of Urfa is a congregational mosque in Urfa, Turkey. It was probably built on the site of an earlier Christian church, in this case possibly one dedicated to St. Stephen. The exact circumstances of the mosque's foundation are unknown — it may represent an expansion of an earlier mosque. Two mosques older than the Grand Mosque are attested in historical documents. One is the one built shortly after the Muslim conquest, and the other is the one built by Muhammad ibn Tahir in 825 in front of the Melkite cathedral. The locations of these mosques, and by extension the cathedral, are unknown. or it may have been a new mosque foundation. The courtyard's west and east walls contain some ancient masonry. Several arches on the north wall were either part of an arcade in the old church or part of an associated building. The Grand Mosque is located on Divan Caddesi.

The courtyard itself is unusually elongated north-south. The main prayer hall is on the south side of the complex, while the minaret is at the northeast corner. A medrese is in the southeast corner, unusually projecting outward. The courtyard itself is slightly elevated and has two cemetery areas, both shaded by cypress trees.

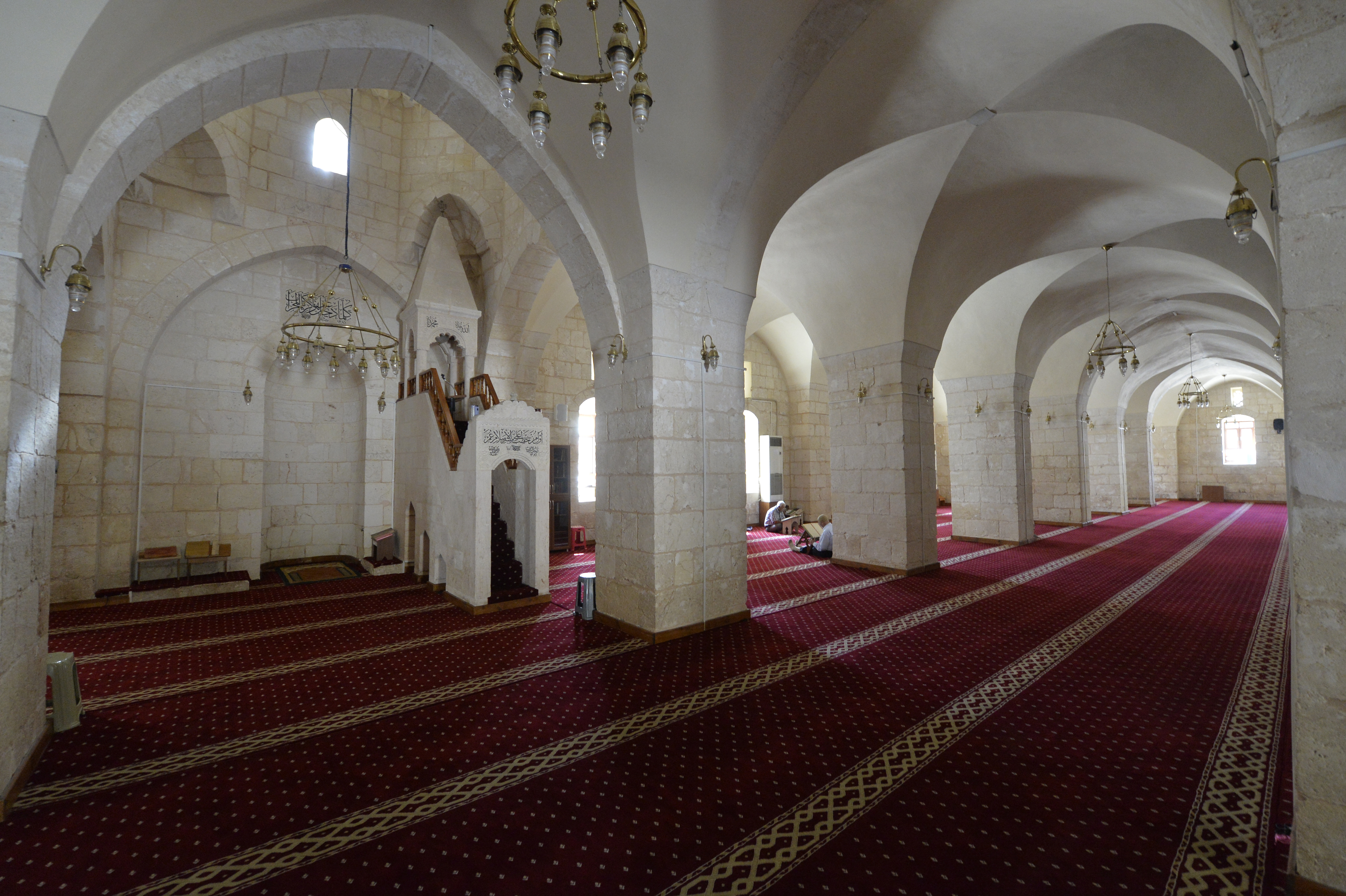
Interior of the Grand Mosque

The main prayer hall was probably built sometime after Nur ad-Din Zengi captured the city in 1146. It was later renovated in 1779. The interior consists of three long east-west aisles separated by low, thick columns. Each aisle has cross-vaulted ceilings. The mihrab and the dome above it are slightly off-center. The whole north face of the structure is fronted by a portico, which is possibly a later addition to the structure. Its ceiling is also cross-vaulted; the supporting columns are irregularly spaced.

The current medrese was built in the late 1700s on the site of an older one. The fountain at its southeast corner now contains an inscription commemorating the old medrese's construction in 1191, when the Ayyubids were ruling Urfa. Its construction was begun one Umar ibn Shahan ibn Ayyub, who may have been Saladin's cousin. Construction was finished under Umar's son Muhammad. This inscription used to be on the medrese's north wall, but was apparently moved to the fountain sometime after 1930.

The current medrese has its own mini-courtyard and consists of four rooms on the courtyard's south side plus a two-story building on the west side. This whole complex is now used as a school.

The minaret, like the main prayer hall, was probably built in the mid-12th century. It is a tall eight-sided tower with large windows on each side of the top floor, giving a commanding view of the city. These windows start at floor level and are partly walled up to protect the muezzin or others from falling. Other windows, much smaller and narrower, are arranged in vertical rows on the north, west, south, and east faces. The top floor is reached by a circular staircase. The minaret's roof was originally flat, but there is now a cube-shaped addition on top, crowned by a lead cupola and with a clock on each side.

An archaeological excavation in 1979 discovered a corridor underneath the Grand Mosque's prayer hall, beginning at its south face and extending north for about 6 or 7 meters before hitting a wall. The excavators hypothesized that this corridor would have then split into two parts and connected either to the old church's cellar or to underground catacombs.

== See also ==
- List of mosques in Turkey
