= Great Mosque of Sivas =

Mosque in Sivas, Turkey

- Sivas Ulu Camii
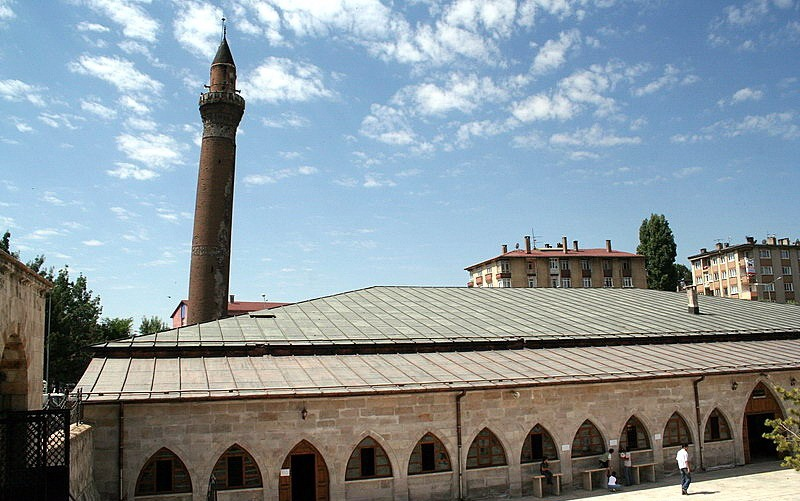

- Location within Turkey

Religion
- Affiliation: Islam

Location
- Municipality: Sivas
- State: Sivas Province
- Country: Turkey
- Interactive map of Great Mosque of Sivas
- Coordinates: 39°44′49.7″N 37°01′03.3″E

Architecture
- Type: congregational mosque
- Style: Anatolian Seljuk

The Great Mosque of Sivas (Turkish: Sivas Ulu Camii) is a historic mosque located in Sivas, Turkey. It was built in the 12th century and is the oldest surviving building in the city. Its minaret was built in the early 13th century.

== History ==
The mosque is the oldest surviving building in Sivas and one of the oldest mosques in Anatolia. According to an epigraphic inscription discovered during restoration work in 1955, the mosque was built in 1196–1197 CE by Kızılarslan ibn Ibrahim, during the rule of Qutbuddin Malik Shah, son of Kilij Arslan II, as emir of Sivas. Another possibility, supported by Michael Meinecke, is that mosque was built in 1109. Some scholars consider it a product of the earlier 12th century under the Danishmendid rulers (before they were annexed by the Rum Seljuks in 1178), based on the building's architectural features.

The minaret was added in c. 1213, during repairs to the mosque. This was also a time when minarets first became a standard feature of Anatolian mosques. The inscription that records this date, also discovered in 1955, attributes the construction to someone named Yusuf.

== Architecture ==
=== Main structure ===
The mosque is designed in a hypostyle form, the earliest type of mosque design in Anatolia. The main structure (the prayer hall) is a low building with a rectangular floor plan and is built of cut stone. The interior is divided into eleven aisles or naves by ten rows of pointed arches supported on thick piers, which run perpendicular to the qibla wall. The hall is covered by a flat wood ceiling. The mosque is entered from the north side via a wooden porch that dates from the modern period. Originally, there may have been a narthex here defined by another row of arches and pillars, as suggested by the existence of two small mihrabs in the northern façade of the prayer hall. This porch is in turn preceded by an open courtyard which still dates from the original construction. Both the exterior and interior of the mosque are generally plain and feature little decoration.

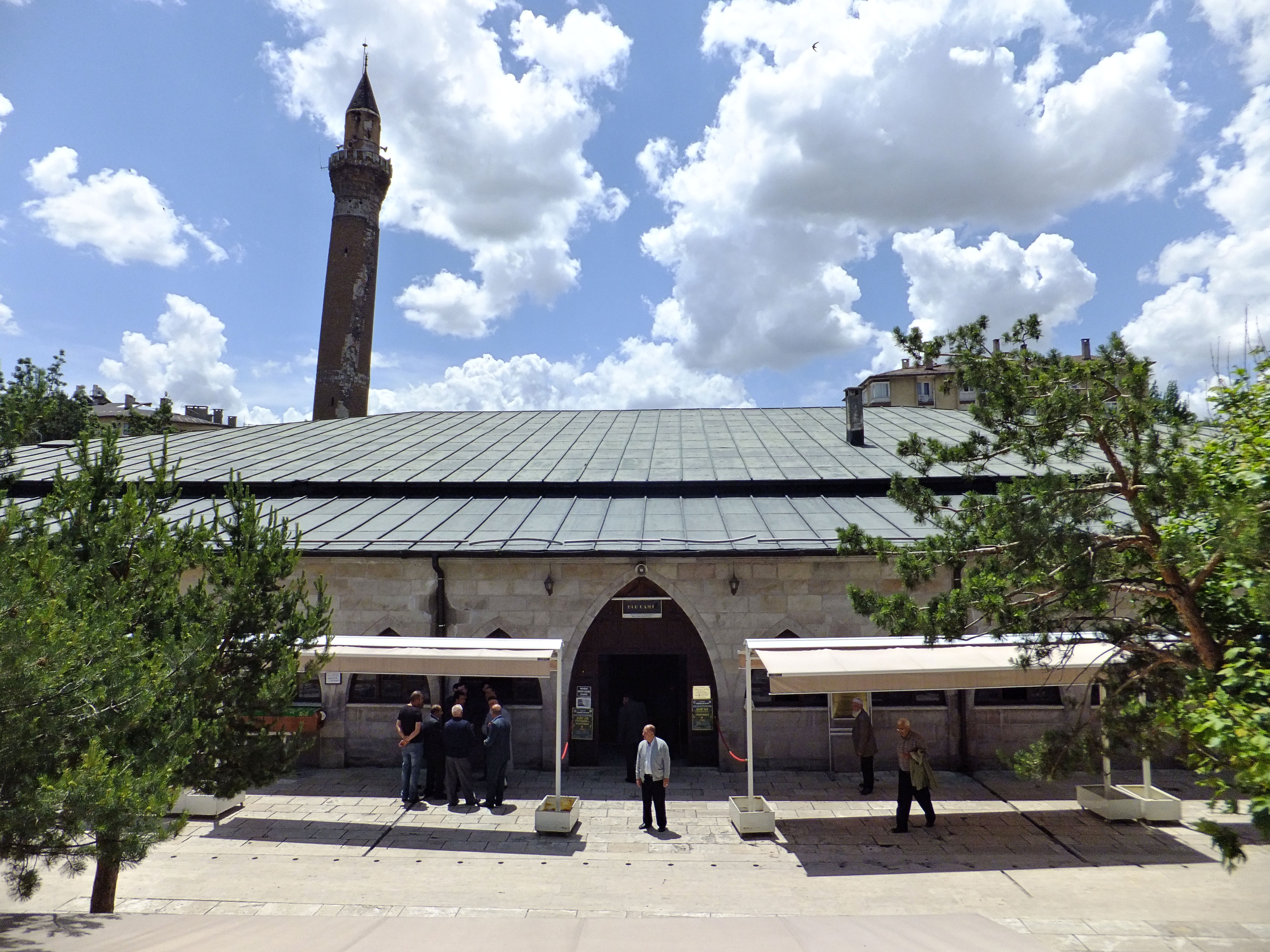
Entrance and northern façade of the mosque from the courtyard

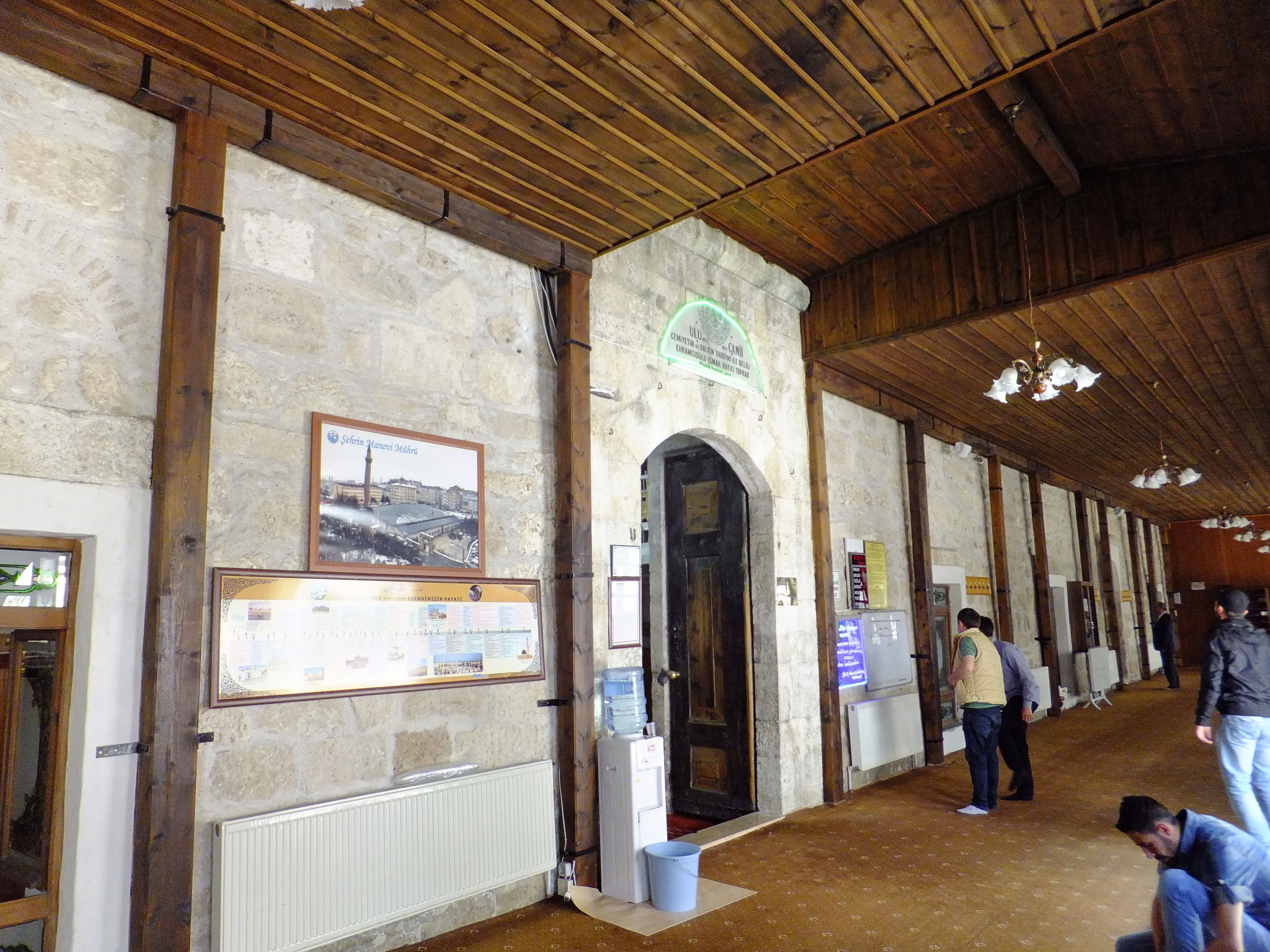
The front porch of the mosque, preceding the main prayer hall

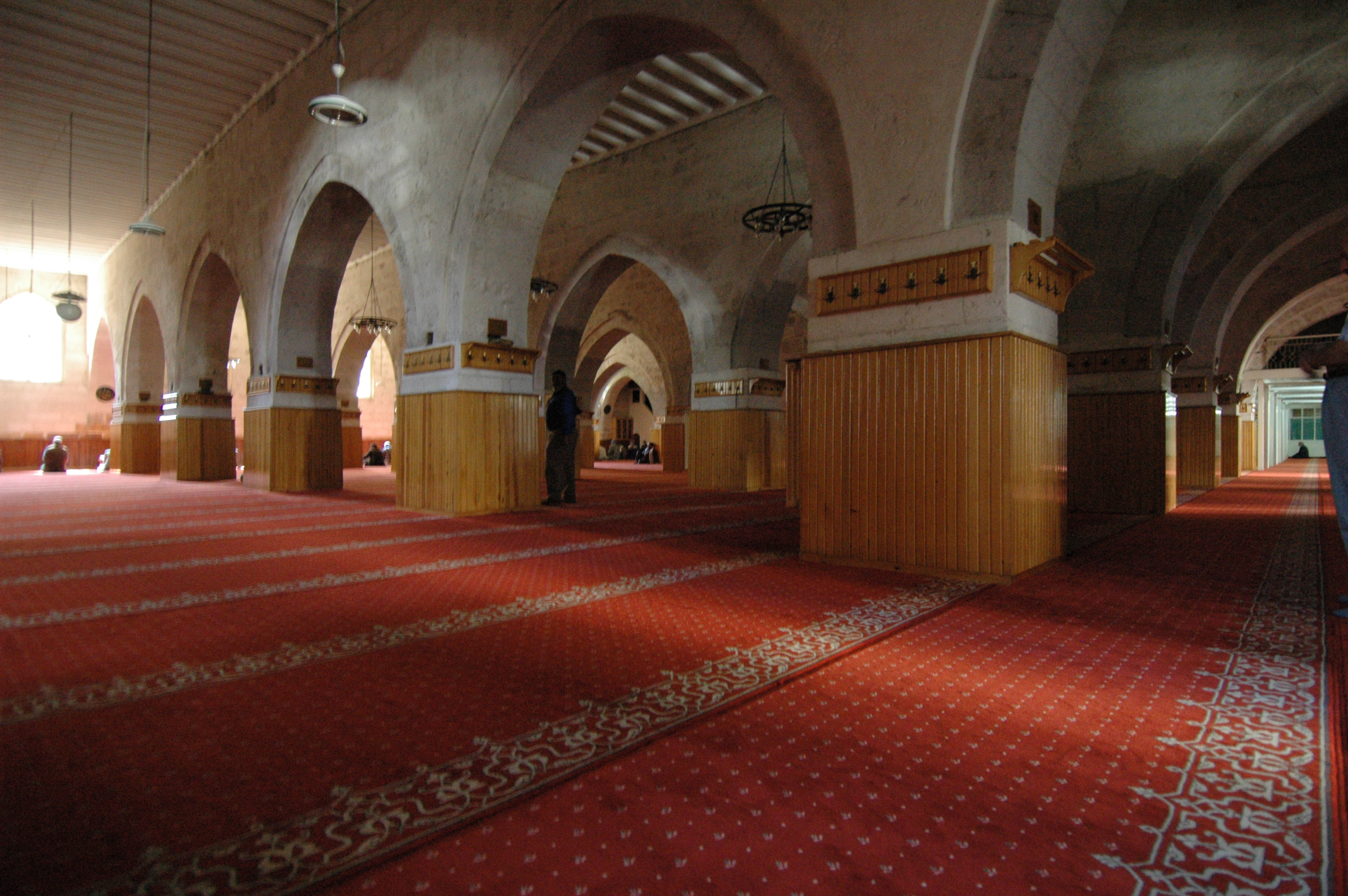
The hypostyle prayer hall

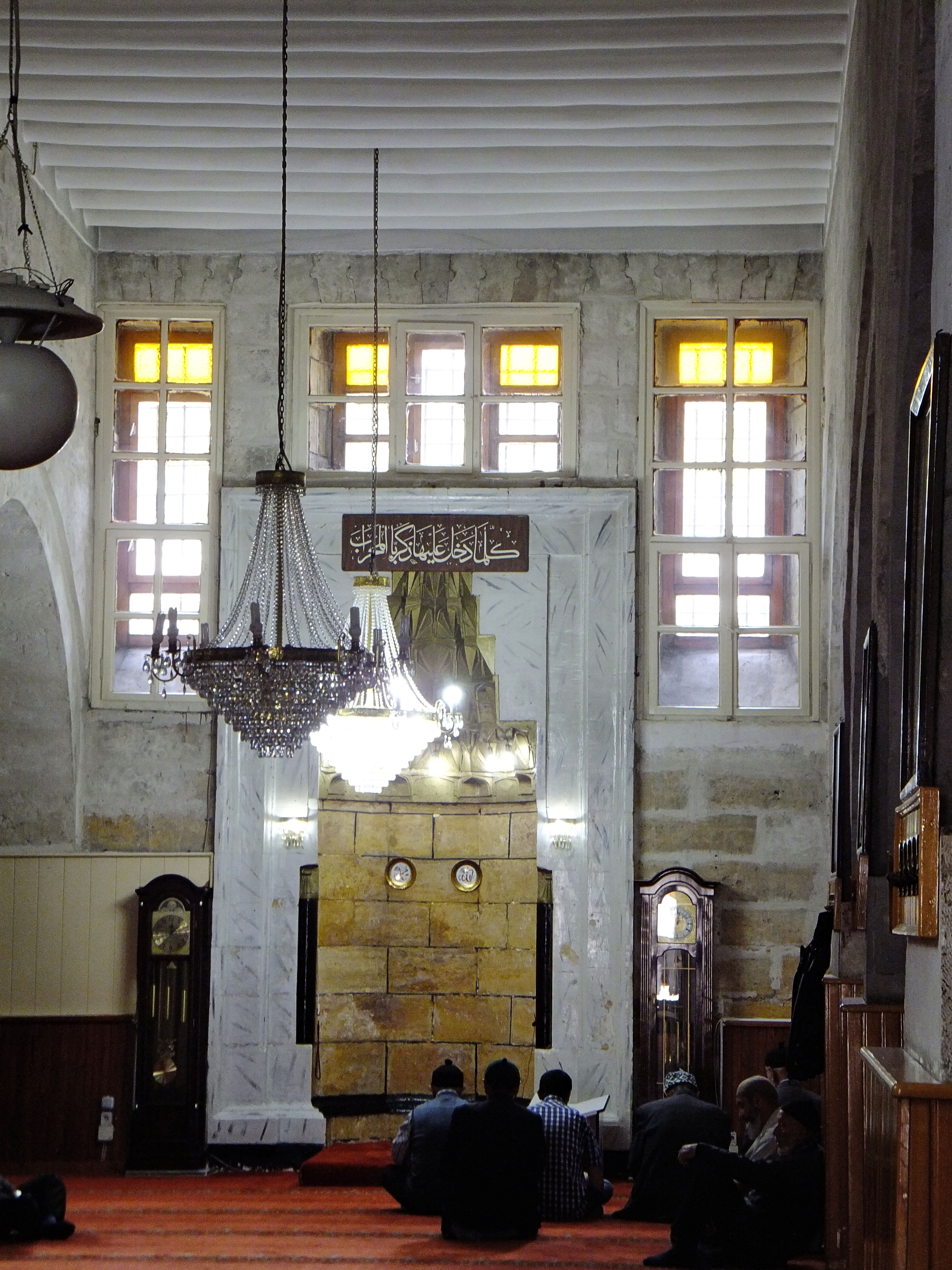
View towards the mihrab

=== Minaret ===
The 12th-century minaret is built in brick and is located near the southeastern corner of the mosque. A helicoidal staircase with 114 steps gives access to the top. Its style is close to the minarets of earlier Great Seljuk architecture in the region of Iran. It has a cylindrical shaft which, unusually for this region and period, rests on an octagonal base. Of the six visible façades of the base, four of them have blind pointed arches. The spandrels of these arches have different decorative brickwork patterns on each façade and they are each topped by a rectangular panel with a Kufic inscription in turquoise glazed ceramic. Of these three inscription panels, three are partially preserved and one has disappeared. Their texts cannot all be reconstructed but they include at least one part of a Qur'anic verse (40:16).

The cylindrical shaft, which tapers slightly, features two monumental inscription bands: one near the middle and another near the top. The top inscription has largely been lost but the lower inscription is partially preserved. The text is now difficult to discern. The letters of this inscription are designed in an elaborated "knotted" Kufic style and executed in baked brick, with one section executed in turquoise glazed ceramic. It style is similar to earlier examples in Ghurid art and may be the result of craftsmen from Khurasan (or previously employed in Khurasan). This also suggests that the minaret was built at significant expense, perhaps sponsored by the sultan.

The balcony near the top of the minaret is supported by corbeling of brick muqarnas. These are executed in different courses of brick. The lower level of muqarnas cells feature alternating decoration of glazed ceramic turquoise decoration or patterned brickwork with strapwork or geometric motifs. The upper layers consist of simpler "V"-shaped or triangular brick projections.

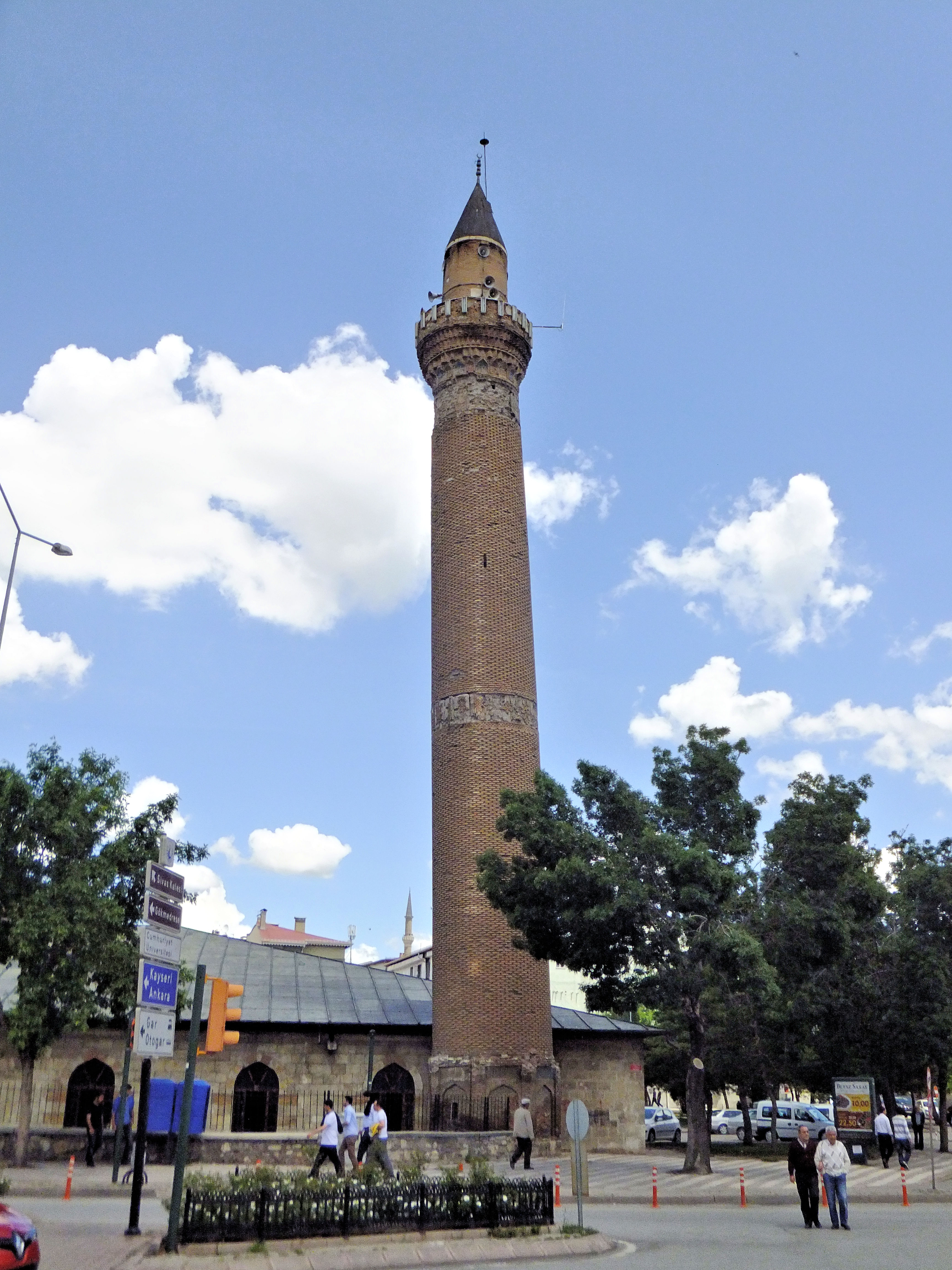
The minaret

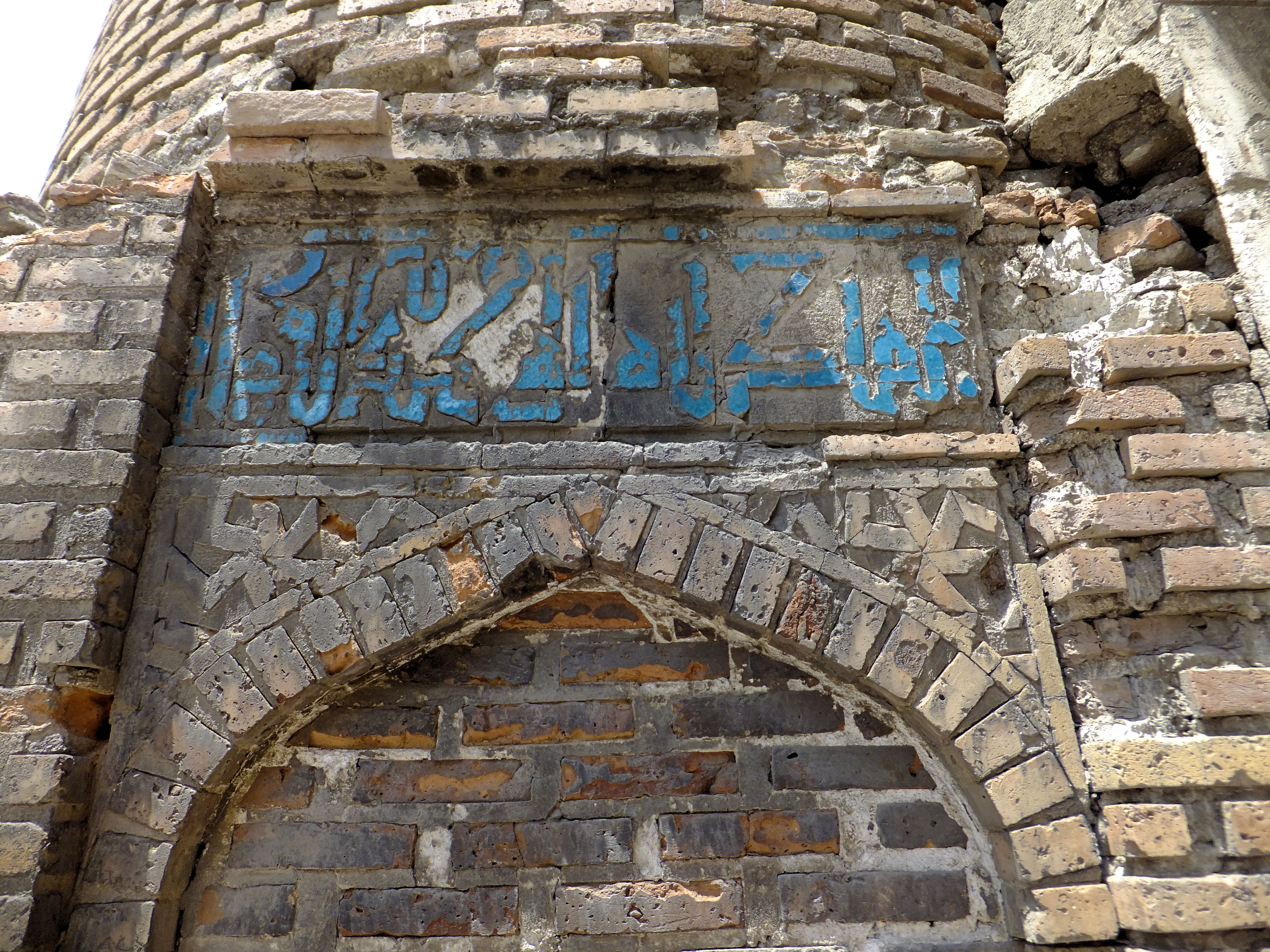
One of the façades of the minaret's base, with a blind arch and inscription panel in turquoise tile

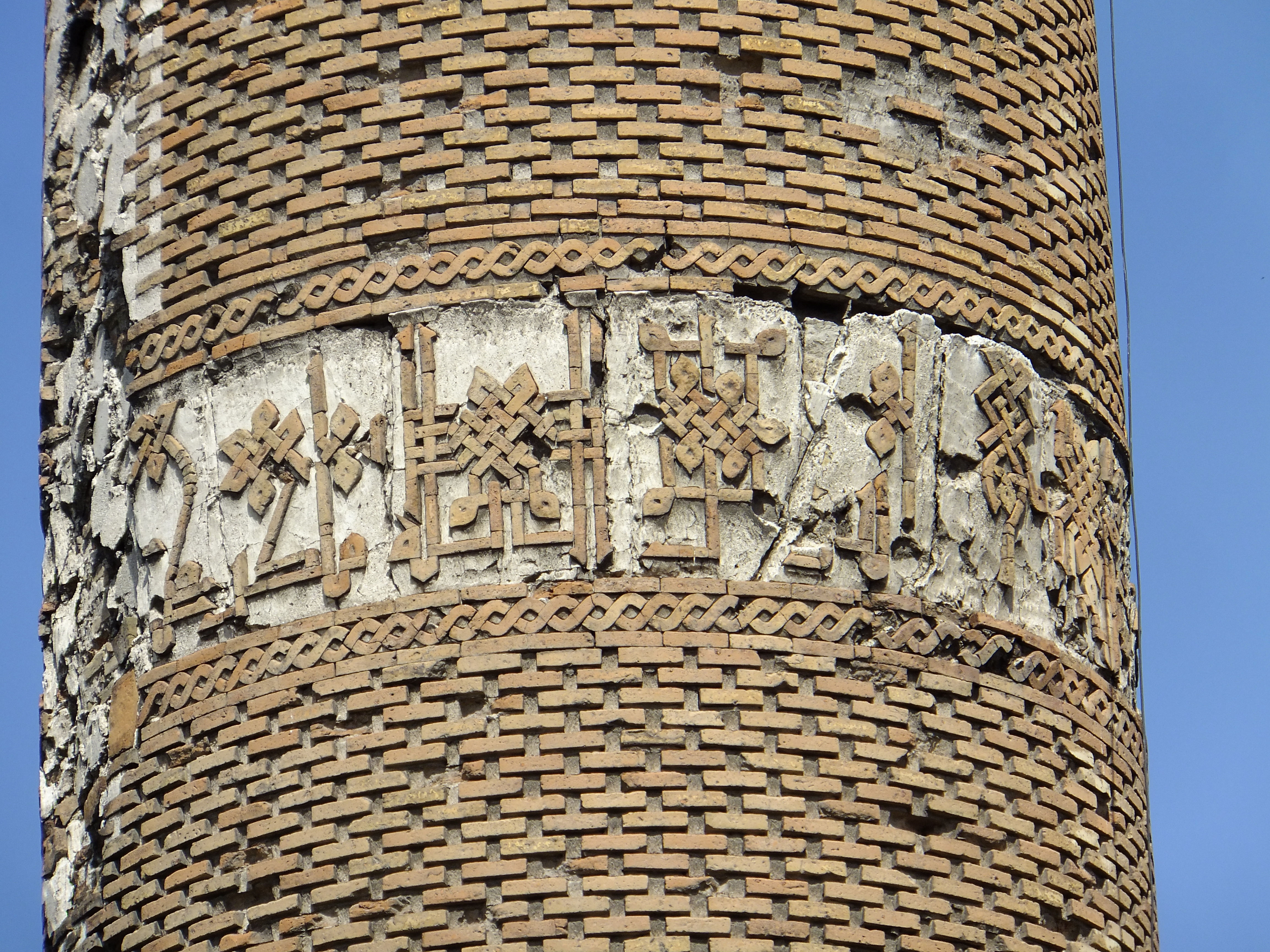
The partially-preserved inscription band near the middle of the tower

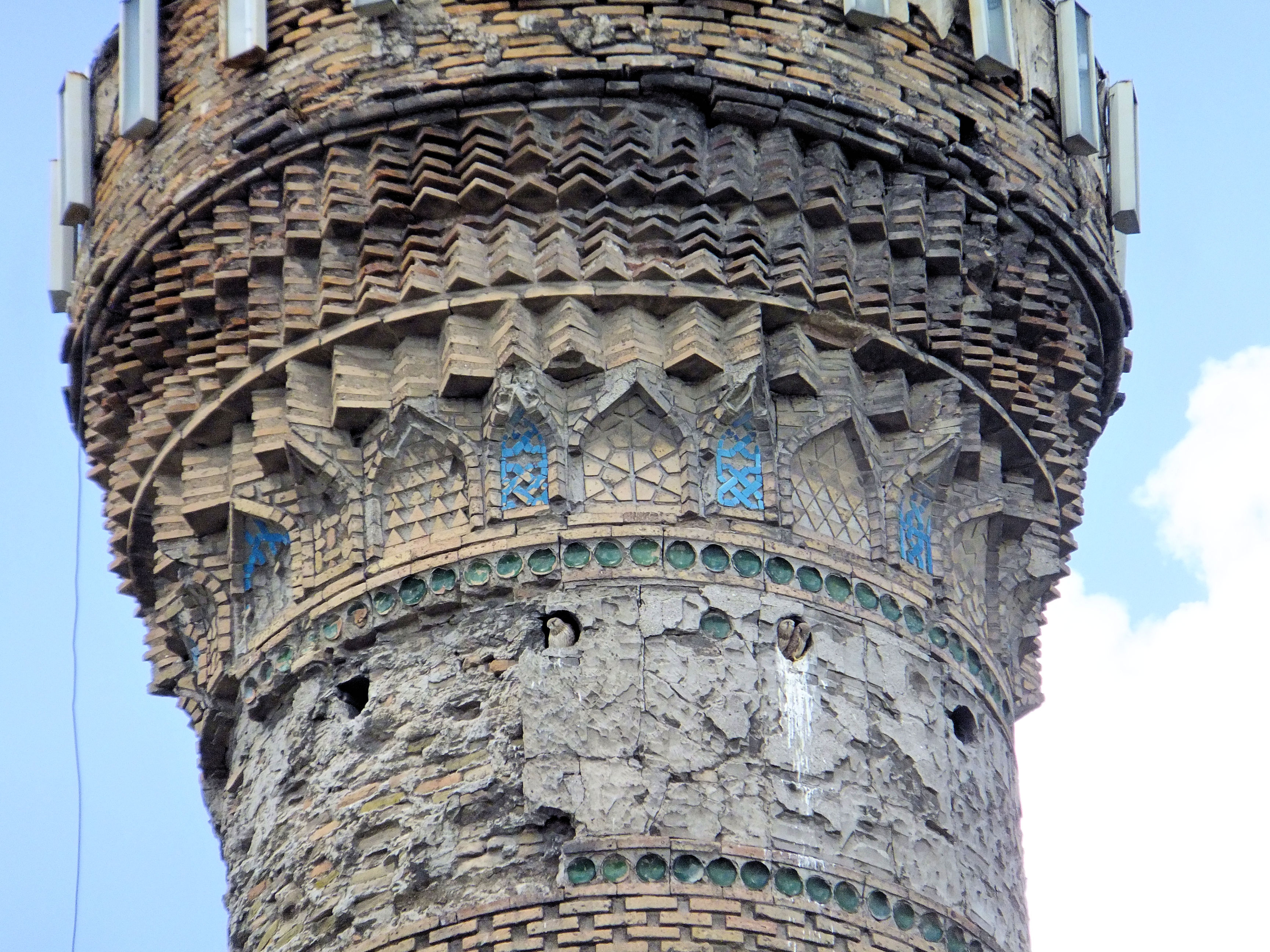
The muqarnas below the balcony

== Restoration works ==
The minaret is currently threatened by a tilt which has long characterized its appearance. As of 2023, the top of the minaret was 117 centimetres (46 in) off from its vertical axis at the base. As of October 2023, a team of Turkish and Italian experts have prepared plans to stabilize the tower by inserting 40-metre-long steel reinforcements inside it. Subsequently, the main building of the mosque will also be repaired and renovated.
