= List of populated places in Konya Province =

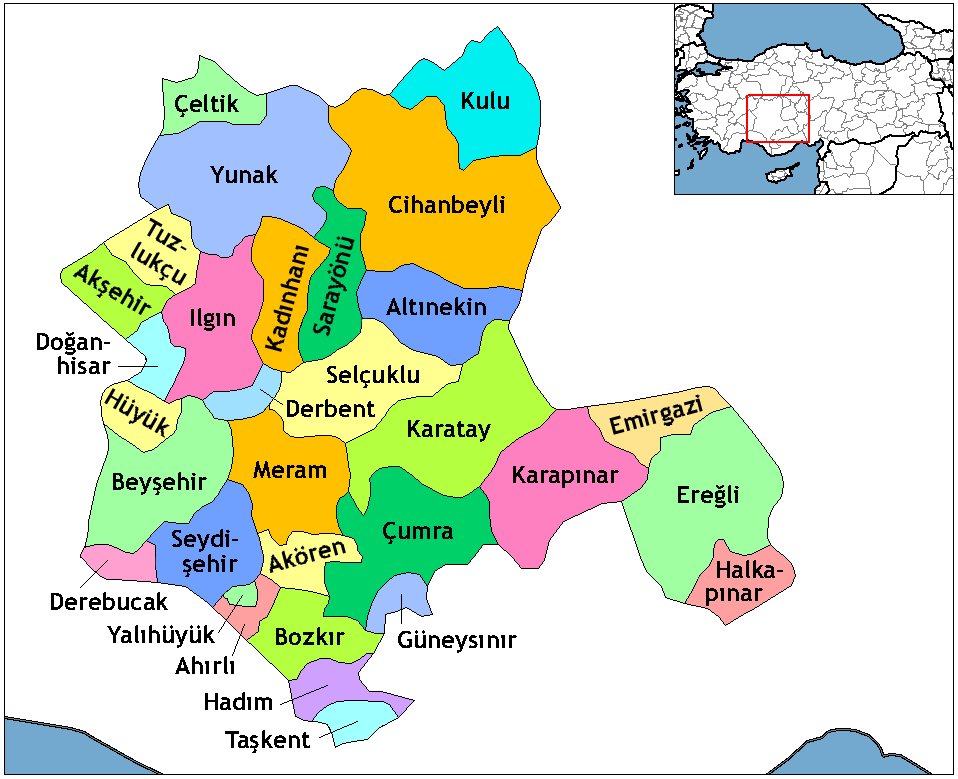
Konya Province

Below is the list of populated places in Konya Province, Turkey by the districts. The first three districts (Karatay, Meran and Selçuklu) are parts of the city of Greater Konya. In the following lists, the first place in each district list is the administrative center of that district.

== Karatay ==
- Karatay
- Acıdort
- Akbaş
- Akörenkışla
- Aksaklı
- Bakırtolu
- Başgötüren
- Beşağıl
- Büyükburnak
- Çengilti
- Divanlar
- Esentepe
- Göçü
- İpekler
- Karadona
- Karakaya
- Katrancı
- Kızören
- Köseali
- Obruk
- Sürüç
- Yağlıbayat
- Yavşankuyu
- Yenice
- Yenikent
- Zincirli

== Meram ==
- Meram
- Bayat
- Botsa
- Çayırbağı
- Çomaklar
- Çukurçimen
- Erenkaya
- Evliyatekke
- Gökyurt
- Hasanşeyh
- Hatip
- İkipınar
- İlyasbaba
- Karaağaç
- Kayadibi
- Kayalı
- Kayıhüyük
- Kumralı
- Sadıklar
- Sarıkız
- Yatağan
- Yeşildere
- Yeşiltekke

== Selçuklu ==
- Seçuklu
- Akpınar
- Bağrıkurt
- Biçer
- Çaldere
- Çaltı
- Çandır
- Dağdere
- Eğribayat
- Güvenç
- Kaleköy
- Karaömerler
- Kervan
- Kınık
- Kızılcakuyu
- Küçükmuhsine
- Meydanköy
- Sarıcalar
- Selahattin
- Ulumuhsine
- Yazıbelen

== Ahırlı ==
- Ahırlı
- Aliçerçi
- Bademli
- Balıklava
- Büyüköz
- Çiftlikköy
- Erdoğan
- Karacakuyu
- Kayacık
- Kuruçay
- Küçüköz

== Akören ==
- Akören
- Ahmediye
- Alanköy
- Belkuyu
- Çatören
- Dutlu
- Karahüyük
- Orhaniye
- Süleymaniye

== Akşehir ==
- Akşehir
- Alanyurt
- Bozlağan
- Cankurtaran
- Çamlı
- Çimendere
- Değirmenköy
- Gedil
- Gözpınarı
- Ilıcak
- Karabulut
- Ortaca
- Sarayköy
- Savaş
- Sorkun
- Söğütlü
- Tekkeköy
- Tipiköy
- Ulupınar
- Üçhüyük
- Yaşarlar
- Yaylabelen
- Yeniköy
- Yeşilköy

== Altınekin ==
- Altınekin
- Akçaşar
- Akköy
- Ayışığı
- Borukkuyu
- Hacınuman
- Karakaya
- Koçaş
- Koçyaka
- Mantar
- Ölmez
- Sarnıçköy
- Topraklık
- Yenikuyu
- Yeniyayla

== Beyşehir ==
- Beyşehir
- Ağılönü
- Akburun
- Avdancık
- Bademli
- Başgöze
- Bayat
- Bayındır
- Bektemir
- Çiçekler
- Çiftlikköy
- Çivril
- Çukurağıl
- Damlapınar
- Doğancık
- Dumanlı
- Eğirler
- Eğlikler
- Fasıllar
- Göçü
- Gökçekuyu
- Gölkaşı
- Gönen
- Gündoğdu
- Hüseyinler
- İsaköy
- Karabayat
- Karadiken
- Karahisar
- Kuşluca
- Küçükafşar
- Mesutlar
- Sarıköy
- Şamlar
- Üçpınar
- Yazyurdu
- Yukarıesence
- Yunuslar

== Bozkır ==
- Bozkır
- Akçapınar
- Armutlu
- Arslantaş
- Aydınkışla
- Ayvalıca
- Bağyurdu
- Baybağan
- Boyalı
- Bozdam
- Çat
- Dere
- Elmaağaç
- Ferhatlar
- Hacılar
- Hacıyunuslar
- Işıklar
- Karabayır
- Karacaardıç
- Karacahisar
- Karayahya
- Kayacılar
- Kayapınar
- Kınık
- Kızılçakır
- Kildere
- Kovanlık
- Kozağaç
- Kuşça
- Küçükhisarlık
- Pınarcık
- Sazlı
- Soğucak
- Sorkun
- Tarlabaşı
- Taşbaşı
- Tepearası
- Tepelice
- Ulupınar
- Yalnızca
- Yazdamı
- Yelbeyi
- Yeniköy
- Yolören

== Cihanbeyli ==
- Cihanbeyli
- Ağabeyli
- Beyliova
- Böğrüdelik
- Çimen
- Çölyaylası
- Damlakuyu
- Hodoğlu
- Kayı
- Kırkışla
- Korkmazlar
- Küçükbeşkavak
- Mutlukonak
- Sağlık
- Sığırcık
- Turanlar
- Tüfekçipınarı
- Uzuncayayla
- Yeşildere
- Yünlükuyu
- Zaferiye

== Çeltik ==
- Çeltik
- Adakasım
- Doğanyurt
- İshakuşağı
- Kaşören
- Torunlar
- Yukarıaliçomak

== Çumra ==
- Çumra
- Abditolu
- Adakale
- Afşar
- Alemdar
- Alibeyhüyüğü
- Apasaraycık
- Avdul
- Balçıkhisar
- Beylerce
- Büyükaşlama
- Çiçek
- Çukurkavak
- Dedemoğlu
- Dineksaray
- Dinlendik
- Doğanlı
- Erentepe
- Fethiye
- Gökhüyük
- İnli
- Kuzucu
- Küçükköy
- Seçme
- Sürgüç
- Tahtalı
- Taşağıl
- Türkmenkarahüyük
- Uzunkuyu
- Üçhüyükler
- Ürünlü
- Yürükcamili

== Derbent ==
- Derbent
- Değiş
- Derbenttekke
- Güneyköy
- Mülayim
- Saraypınar
- Yassıören

== Derebucak ==
- Çamlık
- Derebucak
- Durak
- Taşlıpınar
- Tepearası
- Uğurlu

== Doğanhisar ==
- Doğanhisar
- Fırınlı
- Güvendik
- İlyaslar
- Kemer
- Tekkeköy
- Uncular
- Yazır
- Yazlıca

== Emirgazi ==
- Emirgazi
- Besci
- Gölören
- İkizli
- Karaören
- Meşeli
- Öbektaş
- Yamaçköy

== Ereğli ==
- Ereğli
- Acıkuyu
- Acıpınar
- Adabağ
- Akhüyük
- Alhan
- Aşağıgöndelen
- Aşıklar
- Bahçeli
- Belceağaç
- Beyköy
- Beyören
- Bulgurluk
- Burhaniye
- Büyükdede
- Çakmak
- Çiller
- Çimencik
- Gaybi
- Gökçeyazı
- Göktöme
- Hacımemiş
- Kamışlıkuyu
- Karaburun
- Kargacı
- Kızılgedik
- Kuskuncuk
- Kuzukuyu
- Mellicek
- Orhaniye
- Özgürler
- Pınarözü
- Sarıca
- Sarıtopallı
- Servili
- Taşağıl
- Taşbudak
- Tatlıkuyu
- Türkmen
- Ulumeşe
- Yazlık
- Yellice
- Yeniköy
- Yıldızlı
- Yukarıgöndelen

== Güneysınır ==
- Güneysınır
- Ağaçoba
- Avcıtepe
- Gürağaç
- Habiller
- Karagüney
- Kayaağzı
- Kızılöz
- Kurukavak
- Mehmetali
- Ömeroğlu
- Örenboyalı
- Sarıhacı

== Hadim ==
- Hadim
- Ağaççı
- Aşağıeşenler
- Aşağıkızılkaya
- Beyreli
- Çiftepınar
- Dülgerler
- Fakılar
- Gaziler
- Göynükkışla
- Gülpınar
- İğdeören
- Kalınağıl
- Kaplanlı
- Küplüce
- Oduncu
- Sarnıç
- Selahattin
- Umurlar
- Yağcı
- Yelmez
- Yenikonak
- Yukarıeşenler

== Halkapınar ==
- Halkapınar
- Büyükdoğan
- Çakıllar
- Dedeli
- Delimahmutlu
- Eskihisar
- İvriz
- Karayusuflu
- Kayasaray
- Körlü
- Kösere
- Osmanköseli
- Seydifakılı
- Yassıkaya
- Yayıklı
- Yeşilyurt

== Hüyük ==
- Hüyük
- Başlamış
- Budak
- Çukurkent
- Değirmenaltı
- Görünmez
- Pınarbaşı
- Suludere
- Tolca
- Yenice

== Ilgın ==
- Ilgın
- Ağalar
- Avdan
- Barakmuslu
- Belekler
- Boğazkent
- Bulcuk
- Büyükoba
- Çatak
- Çobankaya
- Çömlekçi
- Dereköy
- Dığrak
- Düğer
- Eldeş
- Geçitköy
- Gedikören
- Gökbudak
- Gölyaka
- Güneypınar
- Harmanyazı
- İhsaniye
- Kaleköy
- Kapaklı
- Karaköy
- Köstere
- Mahmuthisar
- Mecidiye
- Misafirli
- Olukpınar
- Orhaniye
- Ormanözü
- Sadıkköy
- Sebiller
- Tekeler
- Yorazlar
- Zaferiye

== Kadınhanı ==
- Kadınhanı
- Afşarlı
- Alabağ
- Bakırpınar
- Bayramlı
- Beykavağı
- Bulgurpınarı
- Çavdar
- Çeşmecik
- Çubuk
- Demiroluk
- Hacımehmetli
- Hacıoflazlar
- Hacıpirli
- Kabacalı
- Kamışlıözü
- Karahisarlı
- Karakurtlu
- Karasevinç
- Karayürüklü
- Kızılkuyu
- Konurören
- Kökez
- Köylütolu
- Kurthasanlı
- Küçükkuyu
- Mahmudiye
- Meydanlı
- Örnekköy
- Pirali
- Pusat
- Saçıkara
- Sarıkaya
- Söğütözü
- Şahören
- Tosunoğlu
- Yağlıca
- Yaylayaka

== Karapınar ==
- Karapınar
- Akçayazı
- Akören
- Çiğil
- Hasanoba
- Karakışla
- Kayacık
- Kazanhüyüğü
- Kesmez
- Küçükaşlama
- Ortaoba
- Oymalı
- Sazlıpınar
- Yağmapınar
- Yenikuyu

== Kulu ==
- Kulu
- Acıkuyu
- Ağılbaşı
- Altılar
- Arşıncı
- Beşkardeş
- Boğazören
- Bozan
- Burunağıl
- Canımana
- Dipdede
- Doğutepe
- Fevziye
- Gökler
- Güzelyayla
- Hisarköy
- Karacadere
- Kırkkuyu
- Kömüşini
- Köşker
- Sarıyayla
- Seyitahmetli
- Soğukkuyu
- Şerefli
- Tavlıören
- Yaraşlı
- Yazıçayırı
- Yeşiltepe
- Yeşilyurt

== Sarayönü ==
- Sarayönü
- Bahçesaray
- Boyalı
- Büyükzengi
- Değirmenli
- Ertugrul
- Karabıyık
- Karatepe
- Kayıören
- Konar
- Kuyulusebil
- Özkent
- Yenicekaya

== Seydişehir ==
- Seydişehir
- Aşağıkaraören
- Başkaraören
- Boyalı
- Bükçe
- Çatköy
- Çatmakaya
- Dikilitaş
- Gökçehüyük
- Gökhüyük
- Gölyüzü
- Irmaklı
- İncesu
- Karabulak
- Karacaören
- Kavakköy
- Kızılca
- Kozlu
- Kumluca
- Kuran
- Madenli
- Mesudiye
- Muradiye
- Oğlakçı
- Ortakaraören
- Saraycık
- Susuz
- Taşağıl
- Tepecik
- Tolköy
- Ufacık
- Yaylacık
- Yenice

== Taşkent ==
- Taşkent
- Keçimen
- Kongul
- Sazak

== Tuzlukçu ==
- Tuzlukçu
- Çöğürlü
- Dursunlu
- Erdoğdu
- Gürsu
- Konarı
- Koraşı
- Köklüce
- Kundullu
- Mevlütlü
- Pazarkaya
- Subatan

== Yalıhüyük ==
- Yalıhüyük
- Arasöğüt
- Sarayköy

== Yunak ==
- Yunak
- Altınöz
- Ayrıtepe
- Beşışıklı
- Böğrüdelik
- Cebrail
- Çayırbaşı
- Eğrikuyu
- Hacıfakılı
- Hacıömeroğlu
- Harunlar
- Hatırlı
- Hursunlu
- İmamoğlu
- Karayayla
- Kargalı
- Kıllar
- Kurtuşağı
- Kuyubaşı
- Meşelik
- Odabaşı
- Ortakışla
- Özyayla
- Sertler
- Sevinç
- Sıram
- Sinanlı
- Yavaşlı
- Yeşiloba
- Yeşilyayla
- Yığar
