= List of municipalities in Konya Province =

This is the List of municipalities in Konya Province, Turkey

== Municipalities ==
List is sorted alphabetically A-Z, as Districts->Municipalities.

District	Municipality
Ahırlı	Ahırlı
Ahırlı	Akkise
Akören	Akören
Akören	Avdan
Akören	Kayasu
Akşehir	Adsız
Akşehir	Akşehir
Akşehir	Altuntaş
Akşehir	Atakent
Akşehir	Çakıllar
Akşehir	Doğrugöz
Akşehir	Engilli
Akşehir	Gölçayır
Akşehir	Karahüyük
Akşehir	Ortaköy
Akşehir	Reis
Akşehir	Yazla
Altınekin	Akıncılar
Altınekin	Altınekin
Altınekin	Dedeler
Altınekin	Oğuzeli
Beyşehir	Adaköy
Beyşehir	Akçabelen
Beyşehir	Aşağıesence
Beyşehir	Bayavşar
Beyşehir	Beyşehir
Beyşehir	Doğanbey
Beyşehir	Emen
Beyşehir	Gökçimen
Beyşehir	Gölyaka
Beyşehir	Huğlu
Beyşehir	Karaali
Beyşehir	Kayabaşı
Beyşehir	Kurucaova
Beyşehir	Sadıkhacı
Beyşehir	Sevindik
Beyşehir	Üstünler
Beyşehir	Üzümlü
Beyşehir	Yenidoğan
Beyşehir	Yeşildağ
Bozkır	Bozkır
Bozkır	Çağlayan
Bozkır	Dereiçi
Bozkır	Dereköy
Bozkır	Hamzalar
Bozkır	Harmanpınar
Bozkır	Hisarlık
Bozkır	Sarıoğlan
Bozkır	Söğüt
Bozkır	Sorkun
Bozkır	Üçpınar
Çeltik	Çeltik
Çeltik	Gökpınar
Çeltik	Küçükhasan
Cihanbeyli	Bulduk
Cihanbeyli	Büyükbeşkavak
Cihanbeyli	Cihanbeyli
Cihanbeyli	Gölyazı
Cihanbeyli	Günyüzü
Cihanbeyli	İnsuyu
Cihanbeyli	Kandil
Cihanbeyli	Karabağ
Cihanbeyli	Kelhasan
Cihanbeyli	Kuşca
Cihanbeyli	Kütükuşağı
Cihanbeyli	Taşpınar
Cihanbeyli	Yapalı
Cihanbeyli	Yeniceoba
Çumra	Alibeyhüyüğü
Çumra	Apa
Çumra	Arıkören
Çumra	Çumra
Çumra	Dinek
Çumra	Güvercinlik
Çumra	İçeriçumra
Çumra	Karkın
Çumra	Okçu
Çumra	Türkmencamili
Çumra	Yenisu
Derbent	Çiftliközü
Derbent	Derbent
Derebucak	Çamlık
Derebucak	Derebucak
Derebucak	Gencek
Derebucak	Göynem
Derebucak	Pınarbaşı
Doğanhisar	Ayaslar
Doğanhisar	Başköy
Doğanhisar	Çınaroba
Doğanhisar	Deştiğin
Doğanhisar	Doğanhisar
Doğanhisar	Karaağa
Doğanhisar	Koçaş
Doğanhisar	Konakkale
Doğanhisar	Yenice
Emirgazi	Demirci
Emirgazi	Emirgazi
Emirgazi	Işıklar
Ereğli	Aziziye
Ereğli	Belkaya
Ereğli	Çayhan
Ereğli	Ereğli
Ereğli	Kutören
Ereğli	Sazgeçit
Ereğli	Zengen
Güneysınır	Alanözü
Güneysınır	Aydoğmuş
Güneysınır	Güneysınır
Hadim	Bademli
Hadim	Bağbaşı
Hadim	Bolat
Hadim	Dedemli
Hadim	Göynükkışla
Hadim	Hadim
Hadim	Korualan
Hadim	Yalınçevre
Halkapınar	Halkapınar
Hüyük	Burunsuz
Hüyük	Çamlıca
Hüyük	Çavuş
Hüyük	Göçeri
Hüyük	Hüyük
Hüyük	İlmen
Hüyük	İmrenler
Hüyük	Kıreli
Hüyük	Köşk
Hüyük	Mutlu
Hüyük	Selki
Ilgın	Argıthanı
Ilgın	Aşağıçiğil
Ilgın	Balkı
Ilgın	Beykonak
Ilgın	Çavuşçugöl
Ilgın	Gökçeyurt
Ilgın	Ilgın
Ilgın	Yukarıçiğil
Kadınhanı	Atlantı
Kadınhanı	Başkuyu
Kadınhanı	Kadınhanı
Kadınhanı	Kolukısa
Kadınhanı	Osmancık
Karapınar	Hotamış
Karapınar	İslik
Karapınar	Karapınar
Karapınar	Kayalı
Karapınar	Yeşilyurt
Karatay	Hayıroğlu
Karatay	İsmil
Karatay	Karatay
Karatay	Ovakavağı
Karatay	Yarma
Kulu	Celep
Kulu	Karacadağ
Kulu	Kırkpınar
Kulu	Kozanlı
Kulu	Kulu
Kulu	Ömeranlı
Kulu	Tuzyaka
Kulu	Zincirlikuyu
Meram	Hatunsaray
Meram	İnlice
Meram	Kavak
Meram	Kızılören
Meram	Meram
Meram	Sağlık
Meram	Sefaköy
Sarayönü	Başhüyük
Sarayönü	Çeşmelisebil
Sarayönü	Gözlü
Sarayönü	Kadıoğlu
Sarayönü	Kurşunlu
Sarayönü	Ladik
Sarayönü	Sarayönü
Selçuklu	Başarakavak
Selçuklu	Selçuklu
Selçuklu	Sızma
Selçuklu	Tepeköy
Seydişehir	Akçalar
Seydişehir	Bostandere
Seydişehir	Çavuş
Seydişehir	Gevrekli
Seydişehir	Ketenli
Seydişehir	Kisecik
Seydişehir	Ortakaraören
Seydişehir	Seydişehir
Seydişehir	Taraşçı
Taşkent	Afşar
Taşkent	Balcılar
Taşkent	Bolay
Taşkent	Çetmi
Taşkent	Taşkent
Tuzlukçu	Tuzlukçu
Yalıhüyük	Yalıhüyük
Yunak	Koçyazı
Yunak	Kuzören
Yunak	Piribeyli
Yunak	Saray
Yunak	Sülüklü
Yunak	Turgut
Yunak	Yunak

== Changes in 2014 ==
According to Law act no. 6360, belde (town) municipalities within provinces with more than 750,000 population (so called Metropolitan municipalities) were abolished as of 30 March 2014. 168 belde municipalities in the above list are now defunct. The list is kept for historical reference.
