= Derbent, Konya =

Derbent
- District and municipality
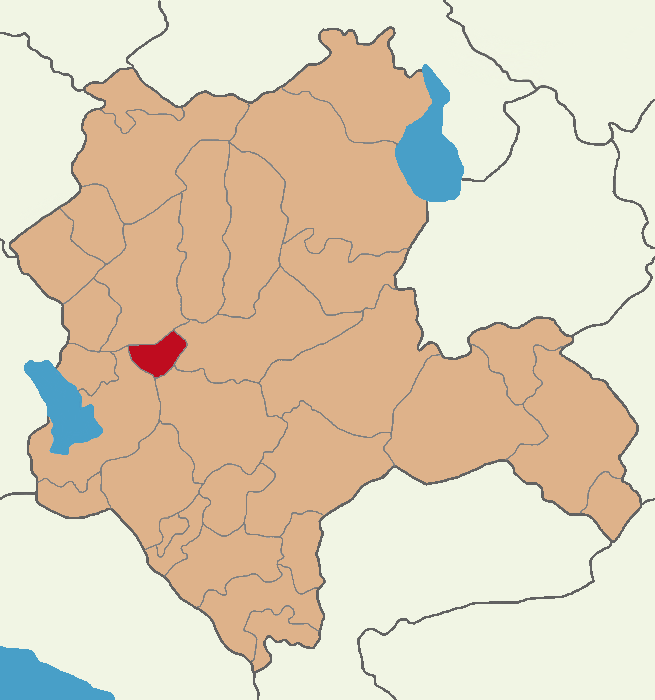
- Map showing Derbent District in Konya Province

- Location within Turkey Location within Turkey Central Anatolia
- Coordinates: 38°00′49″N 32°00′59″E
- Country: Turkey
- Province: Konya

Government
  - Mayor: Hüseyin Ayten (AKP)
- Area: 359 km^{2} (139 sq mi)
- Elevation: 1,480 m (4,860 ft)
- Population (2022): 4,052
  - Density: 11.3/km^{2} (29.2/sq mi)
- Time zone: UTC+3 (TRT)
- Area code: 0332
- Website: www.taskent.bel.tr

Derbent is a municipality and district of Konya Province, Turkey. Its area is 359 km^{2}, and its population is 4,052 (2022).

Its area is 359 km², of which approximately 10 km² is irrigable and the total area of 156 km² is agricultural land. The remaining part is settlements, forest and pasture land. In the Ottoman Period, the word "derbent" was used to mean department. In this sense, the outposts used in passages and straits on mountains are called "derbents".

Derbent remained within the borders of the Eshrefids Principality during the Seljuk period. Eşrefoğulları Principality borders includes the borders of Ilgın, Bolvadin and Akşehir after Beyşehir and Seydişehir. Cities such as Bozkır, Şarkikaraağaç, Yalvaç, Gelendost, Kıreli, Doğanhisar and even Çal were sometimes included within the borders of the principality.

== Composition ==
There are 13 neighbourhoods in Derbent District:

- Arapözü
- Camikebir
- Çiftliközü
- Değiş
- Derbenttekke
- Güney
- Güneyköy
- Hacıahmet
- Karalar
- Mülayim
- Saraypınar
- Süleyman
- Yukarı
