= Kodylessos =

Town of ancient Lycaonia

Coordinates: 37°16′12″N 32°45′53″E

Kodylessos was a town of ancient Lycaonia, inhabited in Roman times.

Its site is located near Gödelisin, Güneysınır, Konya Province, Turkey.
