= Kileci Mosque =

13th-century mosque in Akşehir, Turkey

- Kileci Mescidi
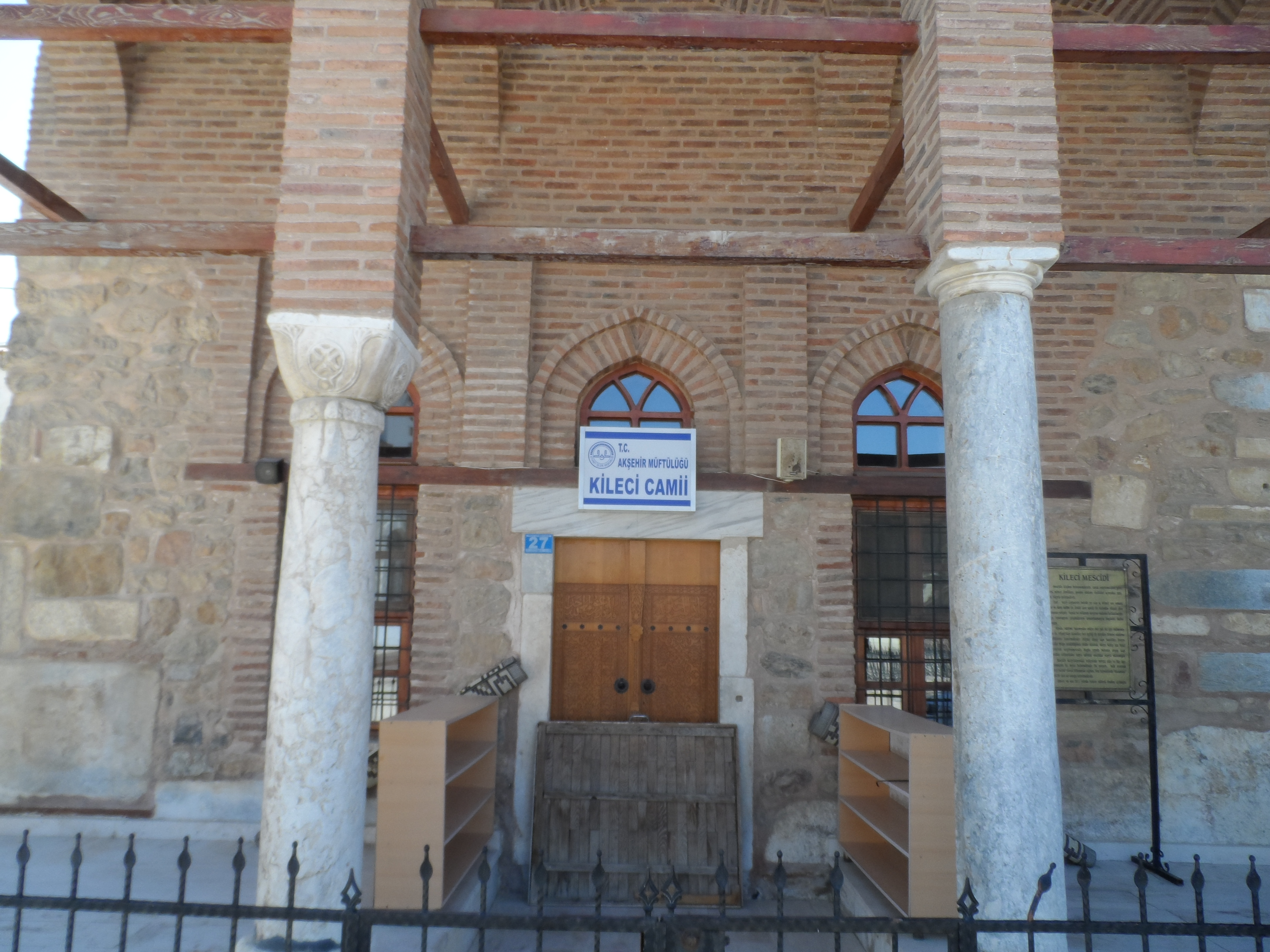

- Location of the mosque in Turkey.

Religion
- Affiliation: Sunni Islam
- District: Akşehir
- Province: Konya Province

Location
- Location: Akşehir, Turkey
- State: Turkey
- Interactive map of Kileci Mosque
- Coordinates: 38°21′16″N 31°24′50″E

Architecture
- Type: Mosque
- Style: Seljukid
- Groundbreaking: 13th century
- Minaret: 1

Kileci Mosque (Turkish: Kileci Mescidi) is a small historical mosque in Akşehir, Turkey. It is a 13th-century mosque built during the Sultanate of Rum era. But the exact construction date, the commissioner and the architect are not known.

The ground area is square. In the north side is there is a narrow nartex (Turkish: Son cemaat yeri). The columns used in this area are collect material from an older Byzantine building. In the original praying area there was no minbar or mihrab. The original dome was demolished during a storm. It was replaced by a wooden roof. But in 2007 during the restoration a modern dome was added to the mosque.

According to the publicity panel in front of the mescit, the original wooden doors of the mescit are in display in Sahip Ata Museum in Konya. The current doors are replicas of the original doors.

Kileci Mosque is in Akşehir ilçe (district) of Konya Province at 38°21′16″N 31°24′50″E It is in Çay neighborhood of Akşehir.

In Turkish, unlike in Arabic, the word mescit refers only to small mosques The name of the mescit probably refers to a tombstone in the yard of the mescit which is believed to be the commissioner of the mescit.
