= Mourisa =

Town in the borderlands between ancient Isauria and Lycaonia

Coordinates: 37°26′10″N 32°22′32″E

Mourisa was a town in the borderlands between ancient Isauria and Lycaonia, inhabited in Roman times. The name does not occur among ancient authors but is inferred from epigraphic and other evidence.

Its site is located near Akören, Asiatic Turkey.
