= State production farms =

State Production Farms (Turkish: Devlet Üretme Çiftliği, abbreviated DÜÇ) is the name of a group of state owned farms in Turkey. They were founded on 1 March 1950 as a model to Turkish farmers. In 1984 they were reorganized within TIGEM, a subsidiary of the Ministry of Agriculture of Turkey. The names of the farms is as follows:

Farm	Province
Altınova	Konya Province
Anadolu	Eskişehir Province
Boztepe	Antalya Province
Ceylanpınar	Şanlıurfa Province
Çukurova	Adana Province
Dalaman	Muğla Province
Gökhöyük	Amasya Province
Gözlü	Konya Province
Karacabey	Bursa Province
Kazımkarabekir	Iğdır Province
Koçaş	Aksaray Province
Konuklar	Konya Province
Malya	Kırşehir Province
Polatlı	Ankara Province
Sultansuyu	Malatya Province
Türkgeldi	Kırklareli Province
Ulaş	Sivas Province
