= Konya Ereğli Museum =

Museum in Turkey

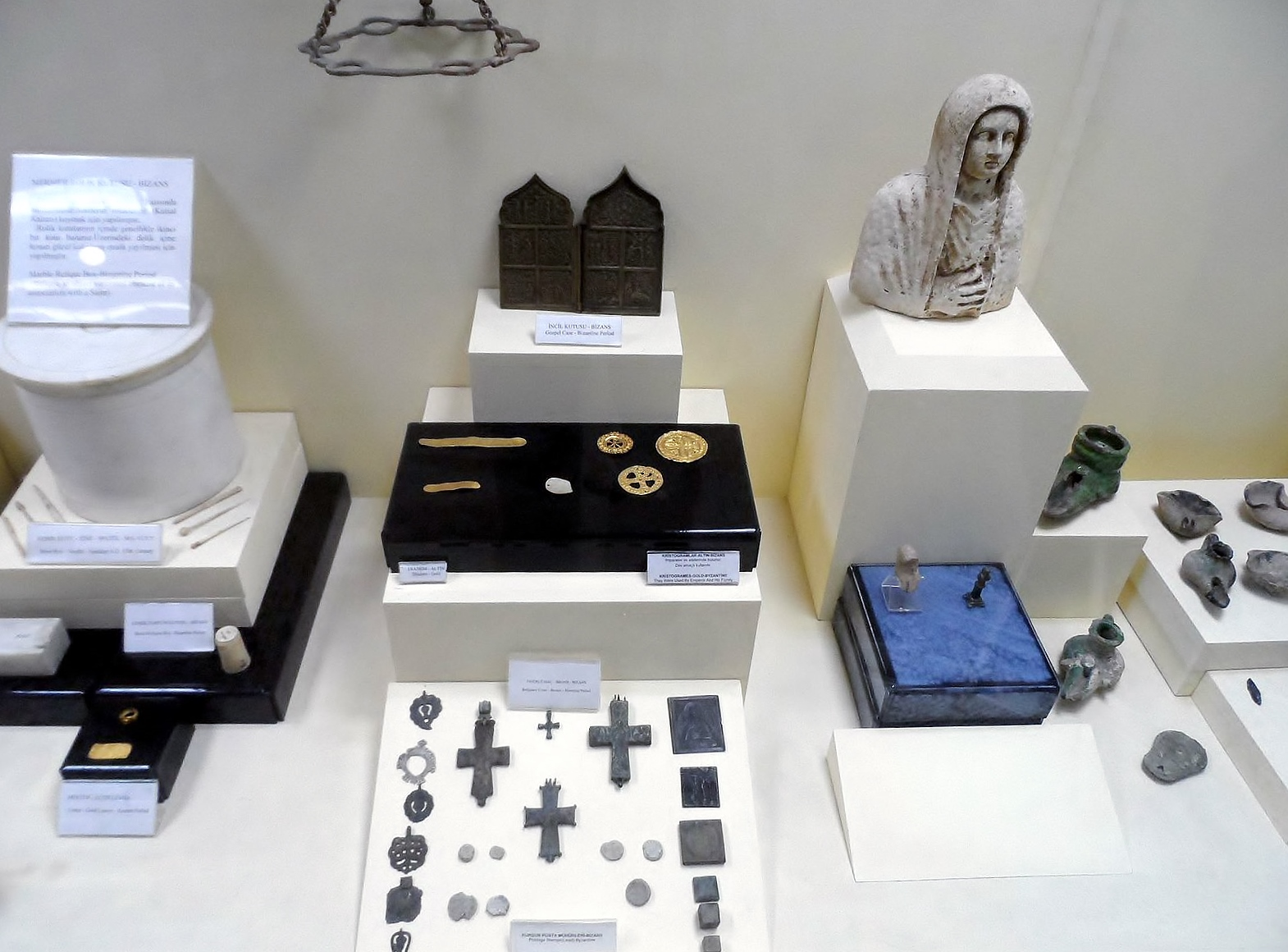
- Museum exhibits

- Location of Ereğli Museum in Turkey
- Established: 1978
- Location: İstasyon Cad. Ereğli, Konya
- Coordinates: 37.51583°N 34.04730°E
- Type: Archaeology, ethnography

Konya Ereğli Museum (Turkish: Konya Ereğli Müzesi) is an archaeological and ethnographic museum in Ereğli district of Konya Province, Turkey. Situated in the İstasyon cad (main street of the city), it is operated by the Ministry of Culture and Tourism.

== History ==
The museum was established as a subunit of the Konya Archaeological Museum in 1967. In 1978, it was moved to its own building and was reestablished as an independent museum. In 2005, the museum underwent a reorganization.

== Exhibits ==
The museum exhibits items from the Neolithic age to the Republican period of Turkey. It consists of two sections, namely for archaeology and for ethnography.

In the first exhibition hall, there are five display cases featuring stoneware, obsidian ornaments of the Neolithic, Hittite and Phrygia era, golden diadems, figurines, candles, parts of steles from Hellenistic and Roman times, various Byzantine artifacts such as glassware, bracelets found in the excavations at the nearby historic underground city of Oymalı, Roman coins classified after emperors, as well as part of a mammoth tusk found in a sanctuary at the nearby Zengen village.

In the second hall, there are two display cases exhibiting items related to the Ottoman and modern Turkish periods.

There are also several large items outside the display cases. There are a total of 8,367 items in the museum.
