= Sahib Ata Complex =

- Sâhib Atâ Külliyesi
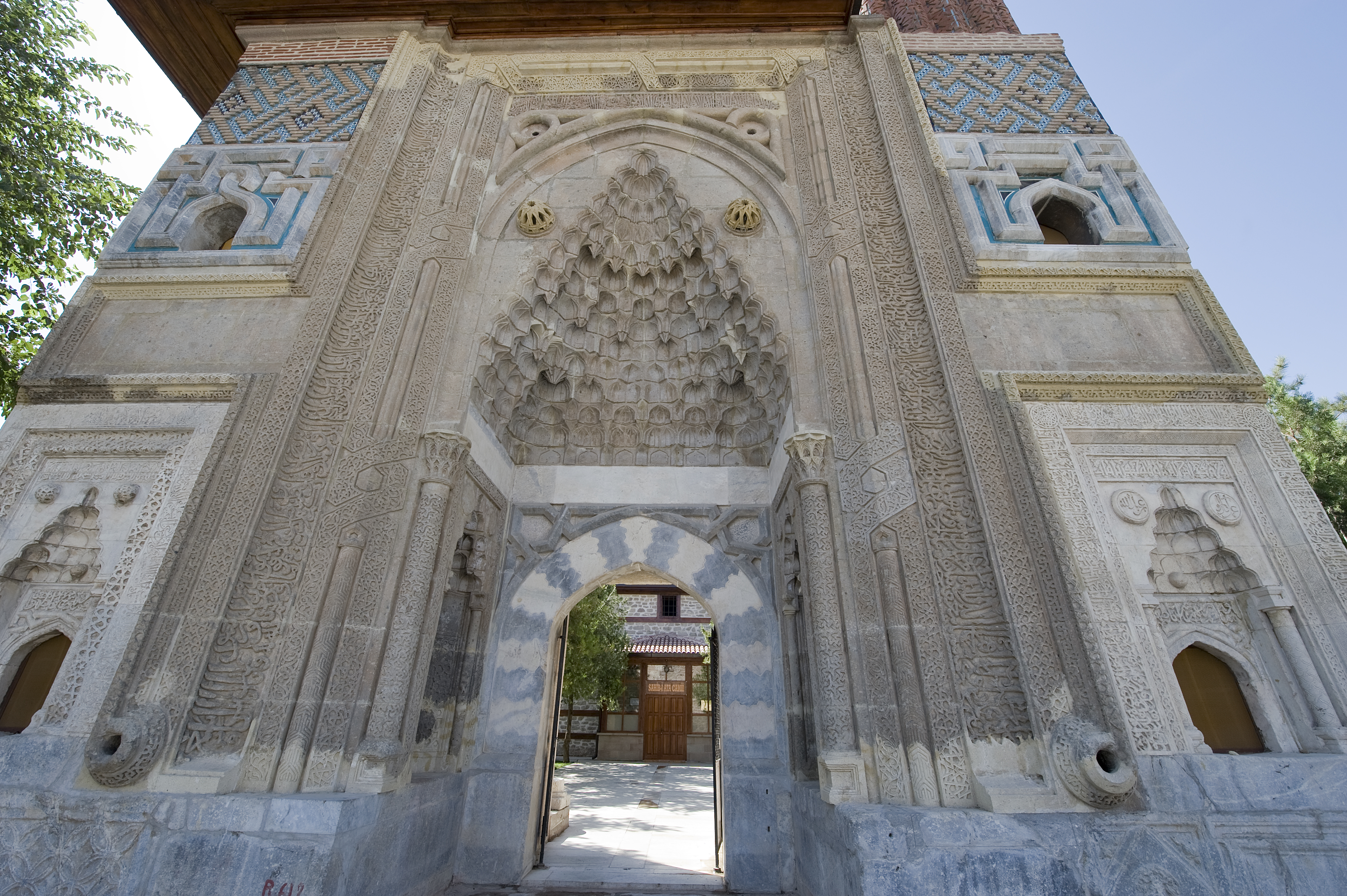
- Entrance to the complex

- Location within Turkey

Religion
- Affiliation: Islam
- Province: Konya Province
- Year consecrated: 1258

Location
- Location: Konya, Turkey
- Coordinates: 37.8675259°N 32.4942149°E

Architecture
- Architect: Abdullah ibn Kelük
- Type: mosque, mausoleum, khanqah and hammam
- Style: Seljuk
- General contractor: Sâhib Ata
- Completed: 1285
- Materials: stone, brick

The Sahib Ata Complex (Turkish: Sâhib Atâ Külliyesi) is a historic funerary and religious complex located in Konya, Turkey. It was built between 1258 and 1285 by Sâhib Ata, the Persian vizier of the Sultanate of Rum. This religious complex consists of a mosque, mausoleum, khanqah and a hammam.

== History ==
The religious complex was built in 1258 under the orders of Sâhib Ata, the vizier of the Seljuk Turks. He rose to prominence after the Seljuks became vassals for the Ilkhanate after the Mongol invasions of Anatolia. Sâhib Ata' and his family are buried in the mausoleum of the complex. The architect of the complex was Abdullah ibn Kelük. Repairs to the complex were made in the 19th century. The final restorations were made in 2007.

== Description ==
=== Mosque ===
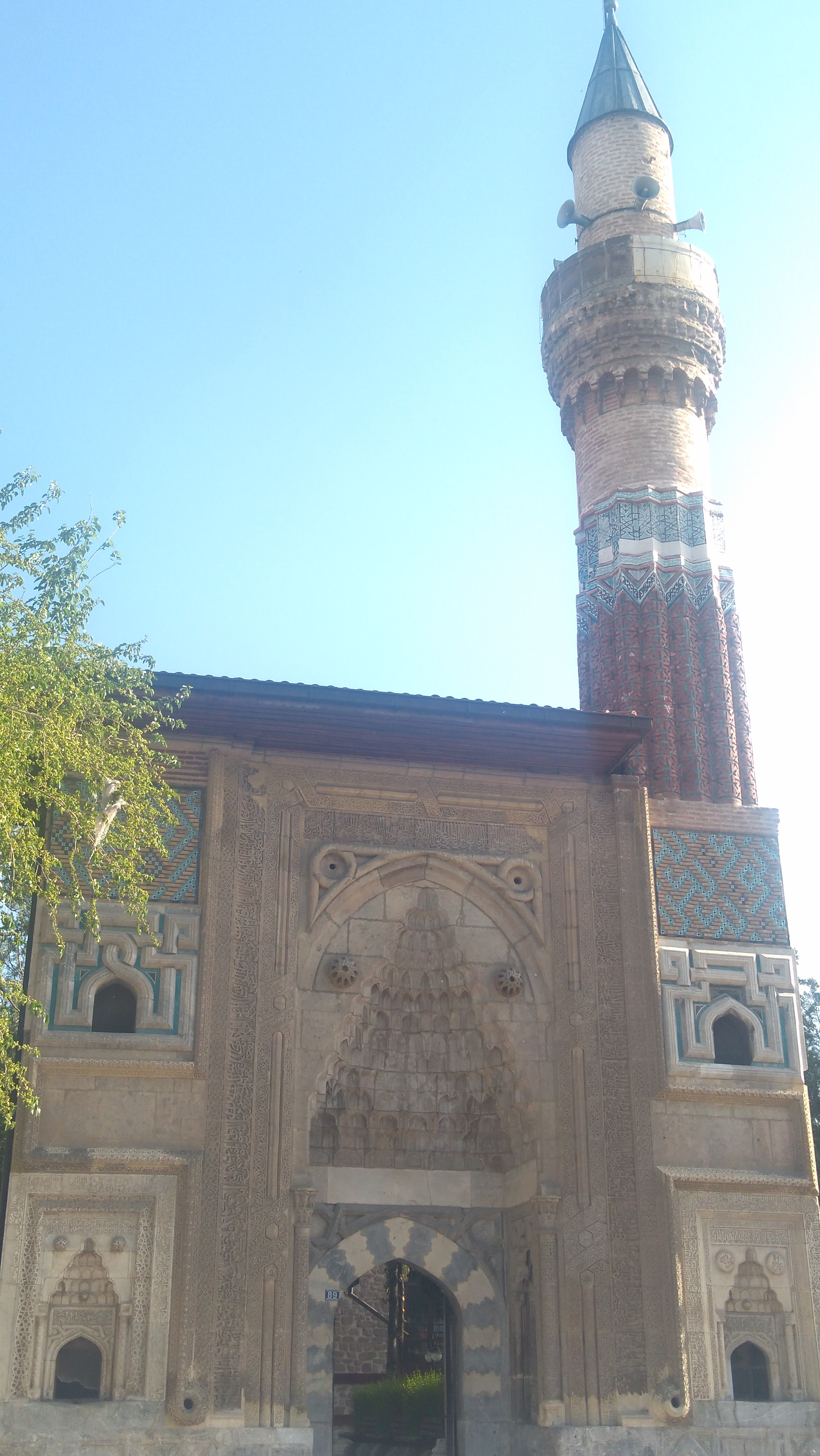
The entrance of the Sahip 'Ata Mosque, with its minaret

The mosque was the earliest structure to be built in the religious complex. The current mosque, however, is an 1871 reconstruction, as the older mosque was almost completely destroyed in a fire. Only the mihrab and the entrance were fully preserved from the original structure. The mosque roof is supported by wooden beams, and it is entered through the iwan on the northern side of it.

=== Mausoleum ===
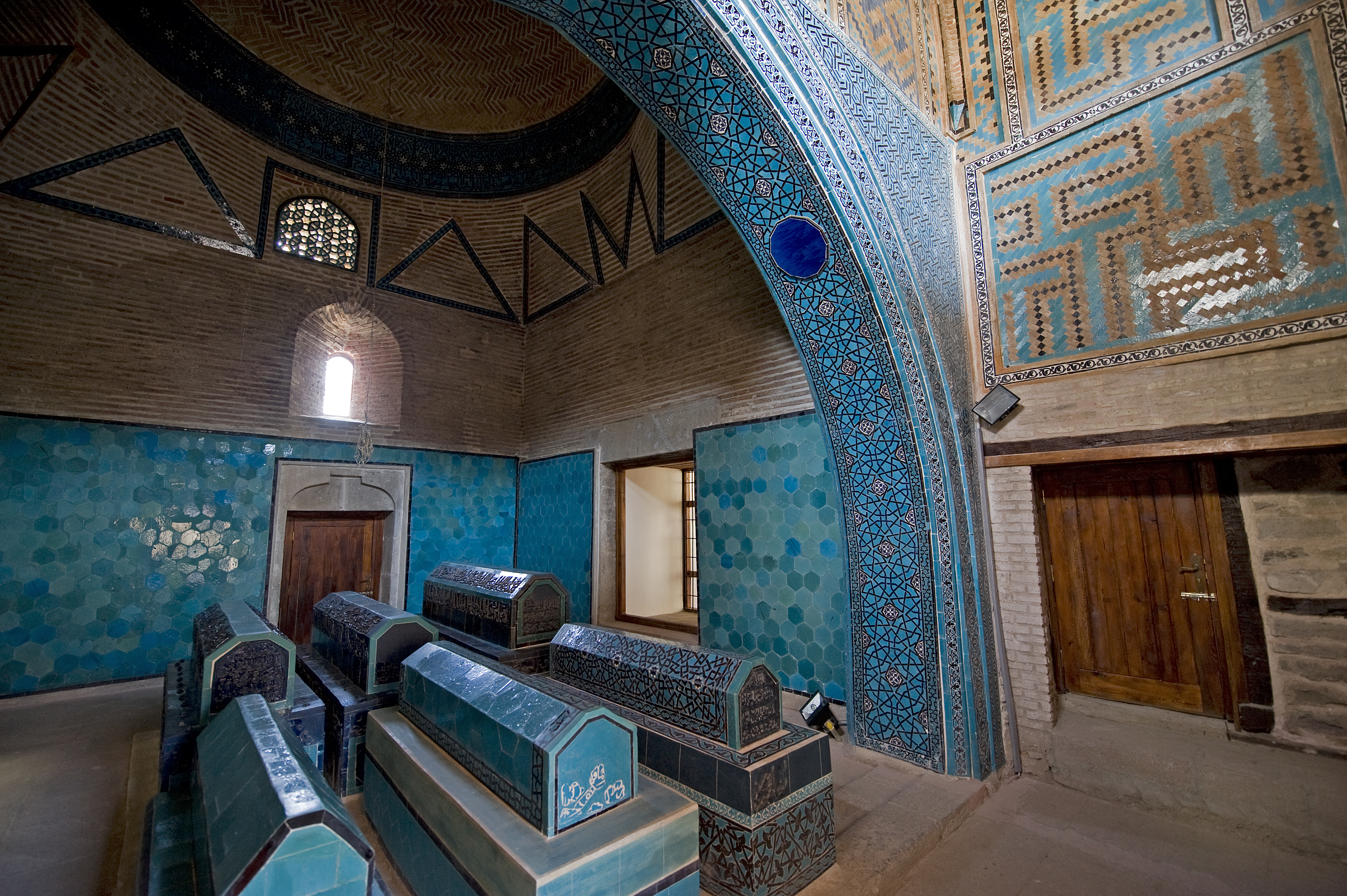
Inside the mausoleum

The mausoleum (türbe) entombs the remains of Sâhib Ata and his family. It is topped by a dome. The walls of the mausoleum are covered with turquoise-colored hexagonal tiles up to approximately 2.5 meters from the ground. The mausoleum is located next to the mosque, and is behind the qibla.

=== Khanqah ===
The khanqah was built in 1279. It is a lodge for the Turkish Sufis or dervishes. There is mihrab, made from plaster, in the southern side of the khanqah.

=== Hammam ===
The hammam is gender segregated. It is rectangular in shape with a symmetrical appearance in the eastern and western directions. The men's section is in the northern part of the hammam, with the southern part being the woman's section. The hammam is topped with domes, with an elliptical one over the men's section.

== See also ==
- Islam in Turkey
- Türbe
- List of mosques in Turkey
