= Akşehir Museum =

Archaeological museum in Konya, Turkey

- Akşehir Müzesi
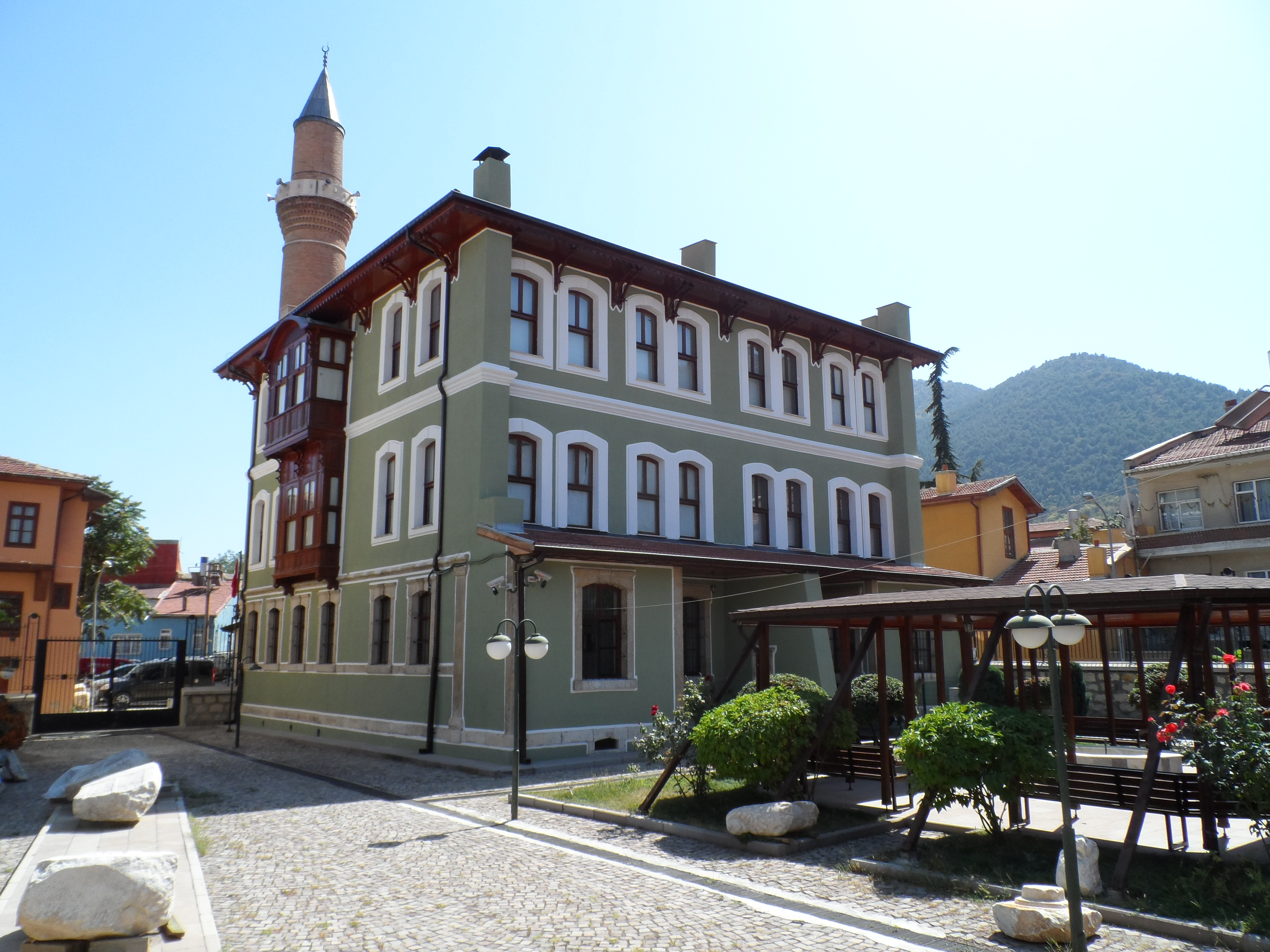
- Akşehir Museum from the north

- Akşehir Museum
- Established: 2007; 19 years ago
- Coordinates: 38°21′24″N 31°24′40″E
- Type: Ethnography, Archaeology,
- Collections: Neolithic, Chalcolithic, Bronze, Iron, Classic, Roman and, Byzantine, Ottoman Empire
- Owner: Ministry of Culture and Tourism

Akşehir Museum, a.k.a. Nasrettin Hoca Archaeology and Ethnography Museum (Turkish: Nasrettin Hoca Arkeoloji ve Etnoğrafya Müzesi), is a national museum in Akşehir district of Konya Province, central Turkey, exhibiting archaeological artifacts and ethnographic items. Established in 2007, it is dedicated to Nasrettin Hoca, a satirical figure in Turkish history and folklore, whose tomb is in Akşehir.

The museum is on Ulucami Street in Akşehir at 38°21′24″N 31°24′40″E. Its distance to Konya is 135 km (84 mi).

The museum was formerly housed in a historic building named Taşmedrese, which was inadequate. The museum was moved later to a mansion, built in 1914 and was owned by a local coroner. The building was acquired by the Ministry of Culture in 1989. After restoration in 2006, it was opened during the International Festival of Nasrettin Hoca on 5 July 2007.

The ground floor is reserved for the administrative offices and the stock rooms. The archaeological exhibit halls are in the first floor. There are various items and coins from Neolithic Chalcolithic era, Bronze and Iron Ages, Classical antiquity, Roman and Byzantine periods. The ethnographic items are exhibited in the second floor. In this floor there are sections about a bridal room and Nasrettin Hoca.
