= Lake Suğla =

Lake in Turkey

- Location within Turkey
- Location: Konya Province
- Coordinates: 37°19′48″N 32°0′18″E
- Basin countries: Turkey
- Surface area: 25–80 km^{2} (9.7–30.9 sq mi)

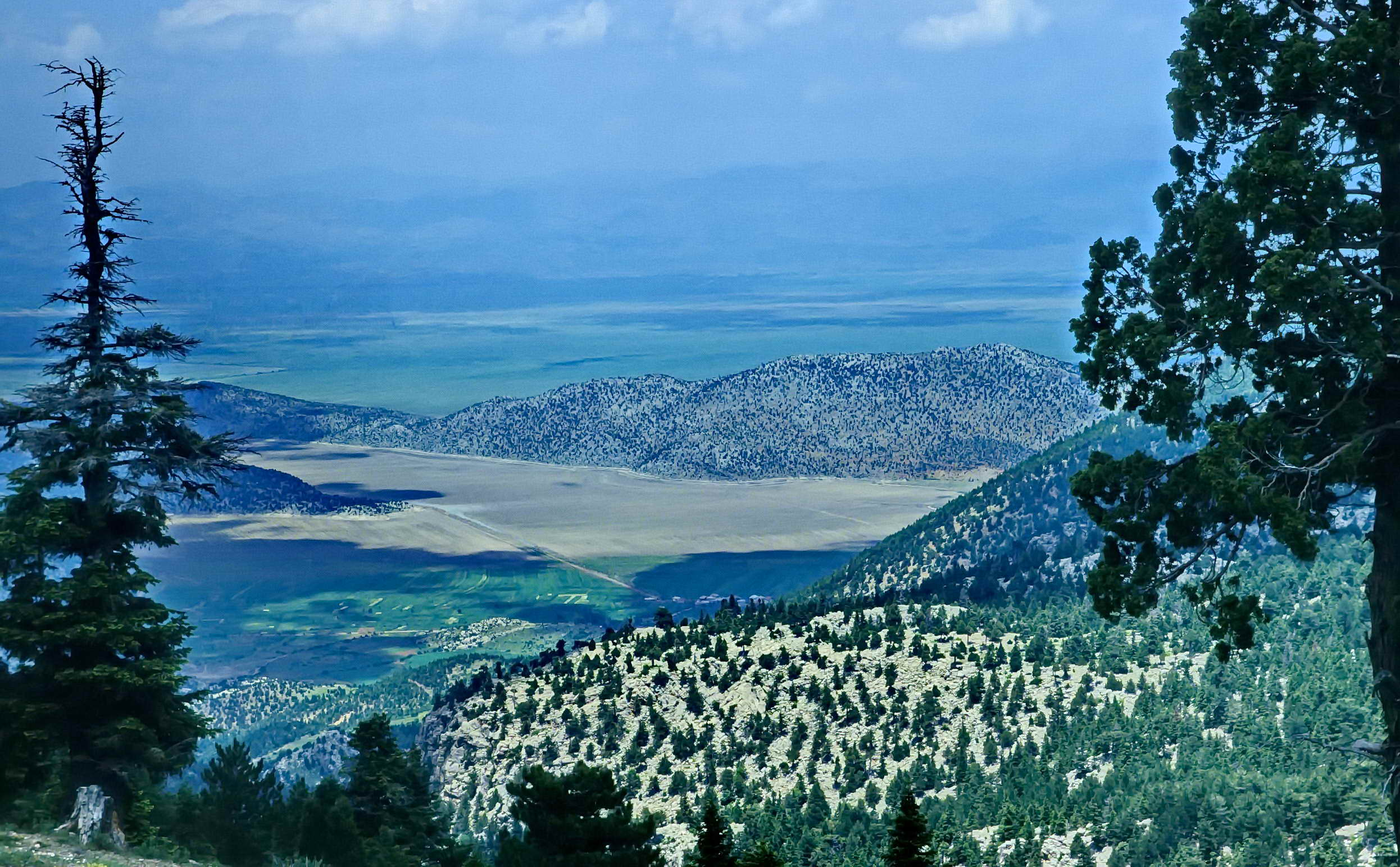
View from the height of the İrmasan Pass near Cevizli into the basin of Suğla Gölü with the partially dried-up lake near Çatmakaya

Lake Suğla (Turkish: Suğla Gölü; anciently Trogitis, Ancient Greek: Τρωγῖτις) is a large lake in Konya Province, in the southwestern part of Turkey. It has an area of 25–80 km^{2}. The water level in the lake fluctuates. Lake Suğla is also an important wetland site for birds. In Graeco-Roman antiquity it was considered part of ancient Lycaonia.
