= Sahip Ata Museum =

Museum in Konya, Turkey

- Sahip Ata Vakıf Müzesi
- Sahip Ata Museum
- Coordinates: 37°52′03″N 32°29′40″E
- Type: Ethnography
- Collections: Seljuks, Ottoman Empire
- Owner: Directorate General of Foundations

Sahip Ata Museum is an ethnography museum in Konya, Turkey. It is under the supervision of Directorate General of Foundations.

== Location ==
The museum at 37°52′03″N 32°29′40″E is in Meram secondary municipality in Konya. Both the archaeology museum and the ethnography museum of Konya are close to Sahip Ata Museum.

== History ==
The museum is a part of Sahip Ata building complex. Sahip Ata was a vizier, equivalent to government minister in modern time, of the Sultanate of Rum in the second half of the 13th century. The complex was composed of a mosque, a madrasa, a hammam and a number of fund-raising shops for the maintenance of the building complex. The tomb of Sahip Ata is also situated inside the complex. The construction began in 1258, and it was completed in 1277. The name of the architect was Kölük. During the Ottoman Empire period, the complex underwent restoration works in 1570, 1702, 1825 and 1848. During the Republican period, further restorations took place in 1945 and 2006. Following the last restoration, it was developed as a museum.

== Exhibited items ==
The museum exhibits 220 ethnographic items. The items are historical artifacts collected from various mosques in the provinces Konya, Aksaray and Karaman. These are carpets, hand-written Qurans, candelabras, swords, beads, etc. The wooden doors from the mosques are especially notable. There are also stone artifacts, original firmans and a historical wall clock. Admission to the museum is free of charge.
