= Tuzlukçu =

- District and municipality
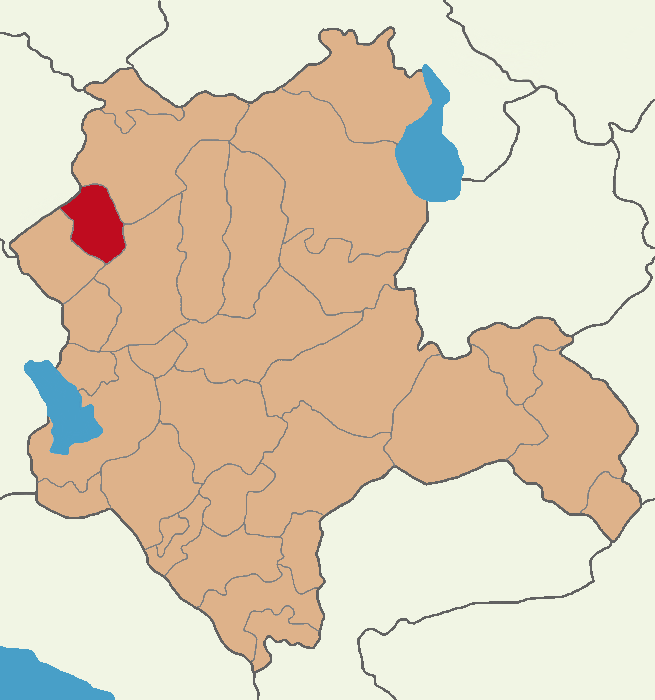
- Map showing Tuzlukçu District in Konya Province

- Location in Turkey Tuzlukçu (Turkey Central Anatolia)
- Coordinates: 38°28′40″N 31°37′35″E
- Country: Turkey
- Province: Konya

Government
  - Mayor: Nurettin Akbuğa (CHP)
- Area: 704 km^{2} (272 sq mi)
- Elevation: 990 m (3,250 ft)
- Population (2022): 6,062
  - Density: 8.6/km^{2} (22/sq mi)
- Time zone: UTC+3 (TRT)
- Postal code: 42970
- Area code: 0332
- Website: www.tuzlukcu.bel.tr

Tuzlukçu (Turkish: [tuzˈɫuktʃu]) is a municipality and district of Konya Province, Turkey. Its area is 704 km^{2}, and its population is 6,062 (2022).

== Composition ==
There are 15 neighbourhoods in Tuzlukçu District:

- Aşağı
- Çöğürlü
- Dursunlu
- Erdoğdu
- Gürsu
- Köklüce
- Konarı
- Koraşı
- Kundullu
- Mevlütlü
- Orta
- Pazar
- Pazarkaya
- Subatan
- Yukarı
