= Ahırlı =

- District and municipality
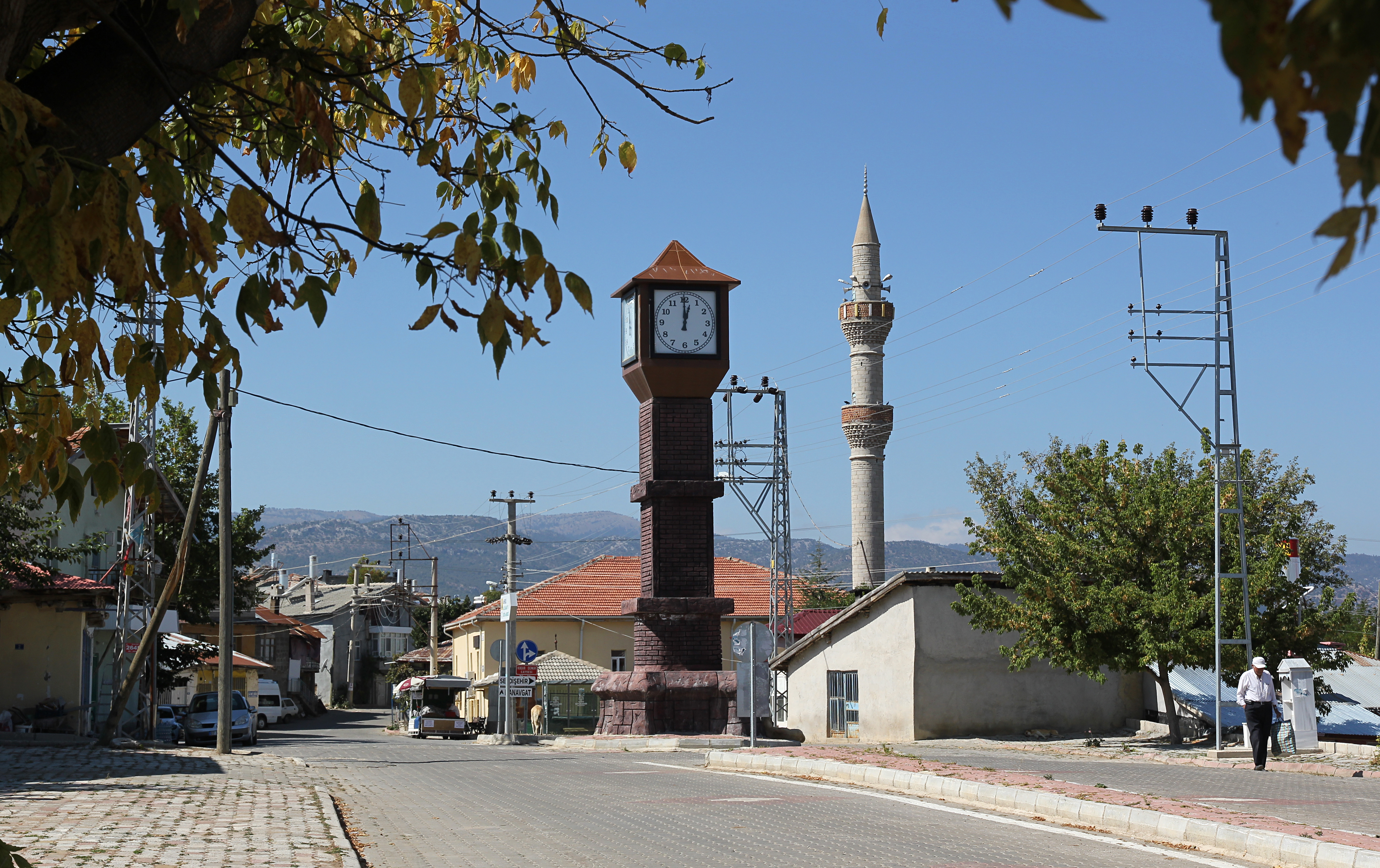

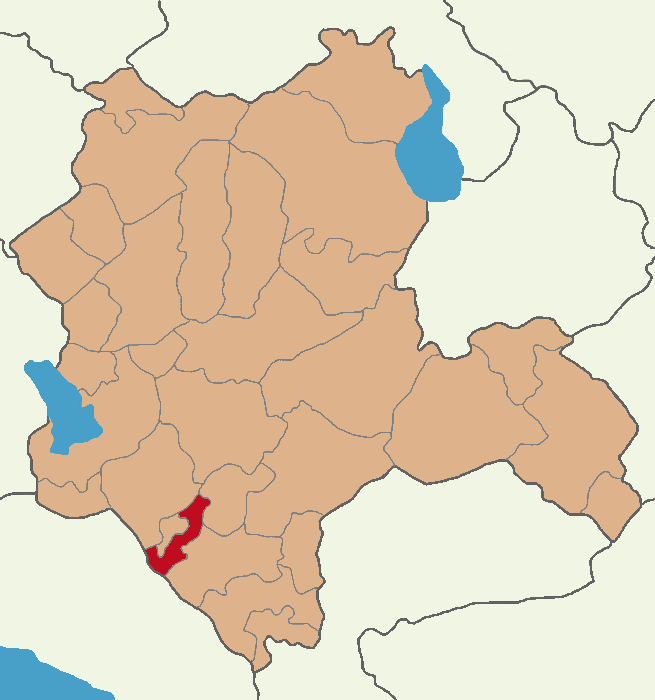
- Map showing Ahırlı District in Konya Province

- Location within Turkey Location within Turkey Central Anatolia
- Coordinates: 37°14′15″N 32°07′05″E
- Country: Turkey
- Province: Konya

Government
  - Mayor: Ali Üzlük (AKP)
- Area: 325 km^{2} (125 sq mi)
- Elevation: 1,179 m (3,868 ft)
- Population (2022): 4,574
  - Density: 14.1/km^{2} (36.5/sq mi)
- Time zone: UTC+3 (TRT)
- Postal code: 42390
- Area code: 0332
- Climate: Csb
- Website: www.ahirli.bel.tr

Ahırlı is a municipality and district of Konya Province, Turkey. Its area is 325 km^{2}, and its population is 4,574 (2022).

== Composition ==
There are 15 neighbourhoods in Ahırlı District:

- Akkise
- Aliçerçi
- Bademli
- Balıklava
- Büyüköz
- Çiftlikköy
- Çukurbucak
- Erdoğan
- Hamzalar
- Hengeme
- Karacakuyu
- Kayacık
- Küçüköz
- Kuruçay
- Merkez
