= Yalıhüyük =

- District and municipality
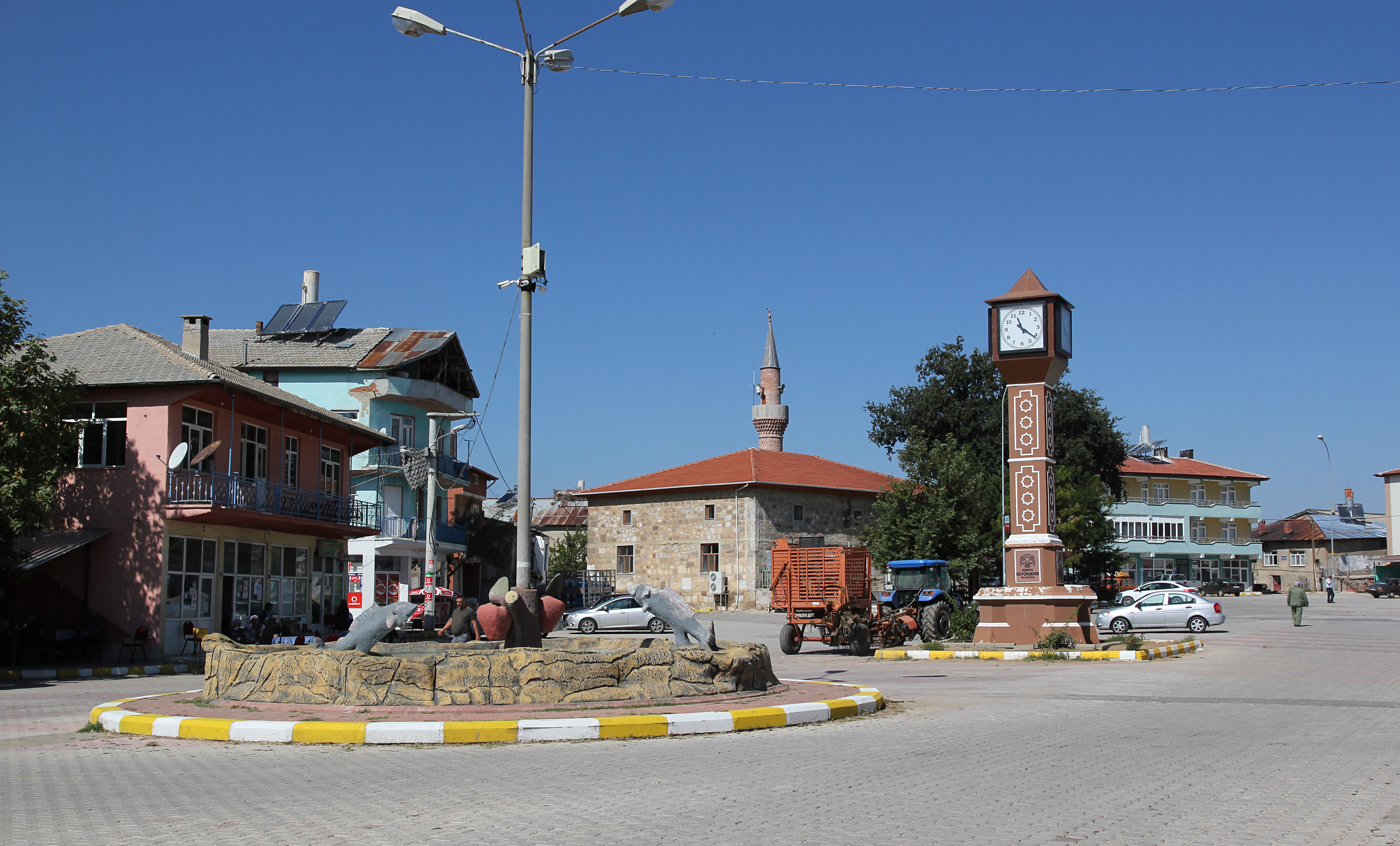
- Yalıhüyük town center

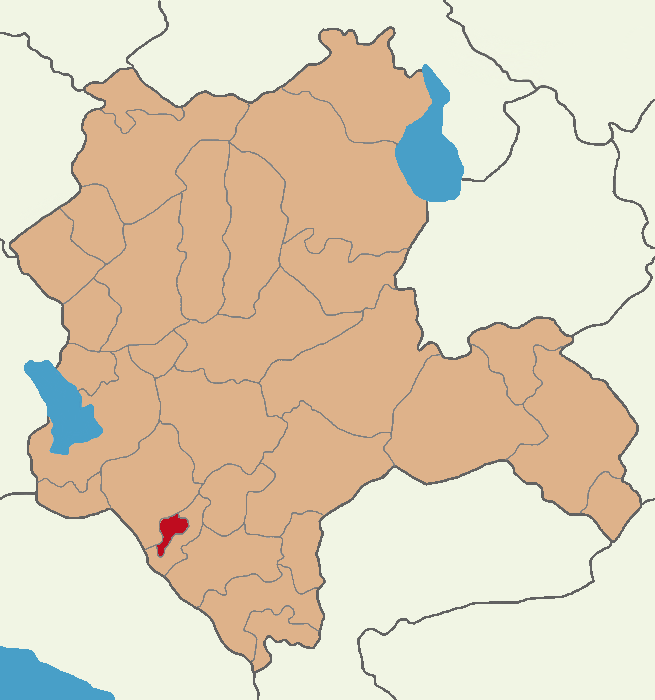
- Map showing Yalıhüyük District in Konya Province

- Location within Turkey Location within Turkey Central Anatolia
- Coordinates: 37°18′13″N 32°05′13″E
- Country: Turkey
- Province: Konya

Government
  - Mayor: Mehmet Ali Yılmaz (AKP)
- Area: 94 km^{2} (36 sq mi)
- Elevation: 1,094 m (3,589 ft)
- Population (2022): 1,710
  - Density: 18/km^{2} (47/sq mi)
- Time zone: UTC+3 (TRT)
- Postal code: 42470
- Area code: 0332
- Website: www.yalihuyuk.bel.tr

Yalıhüyük (Turkish: [jaˈɫɯhyjyc]) is a municipality and district of Konya Province, Turkey. Its area is 94 km^{2}, and its population is 1,710 (2022). Its elevation is 1,094 m (3,589 ft). Gölcük Plateau is located in the district.

== Composition ==
There are 4 neighbourhoods in Yalıhüyük District:

- Arasöğüt
- Aşağı
- Sarayköy
- Yukarı
