= Halkapınar, Konya =

Halkapınar
- District and municipality
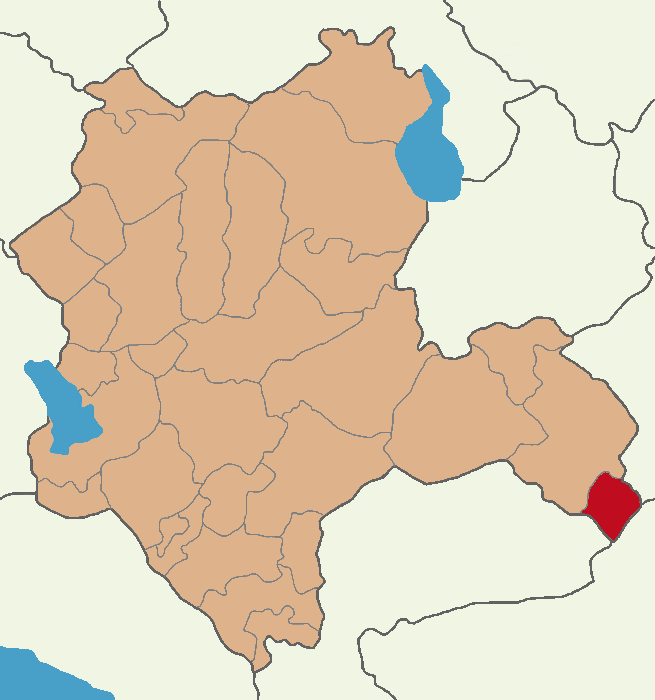
- Map showing Halkapınar District in Konya Province

- Location in Turkey Halkapınar (Turkey Central Anatolia)
- Coordinates: 37°26′06″N 34°11′19″E
- Country: Turkey
- Province: Konya

Government
  - Mayor: Mehmet Vardar (BBP)
  - Kaymakam: Enes Talha Ulusoy
- Area: 605 km^{2} (234 sq mi)
- Elevation: 1,160 m (3,810 ft)
- Population (2022): 3,909
  - Density: 6.5/km^{2} (17/sq mi)
- Time zone: UTC+3 (TRT)
- Postal code: 42980
- Area code: 0332

Halkapınar is a municipality and district of Konya Province, Turkey. Its area is 605 km^{2}, and its population is 3,909 (2022).

== Composition ==
There are 17 neighbourhoods in Halkapınar District:

- Bahçelievler
- Büyükdoğan
- Çakıllar
- Cumhuriyet
- Dedeli
- Delimahmutlu
- Eskihisar
- İvriz
- Karayusuflu
- Kayasaray
- Körlü
- Kösere
- Nernek
- Osmanköseli
- Seydifakılı
- Yassıkaya
- Yeşilyurt
