= Hüyük =

- District and municipality
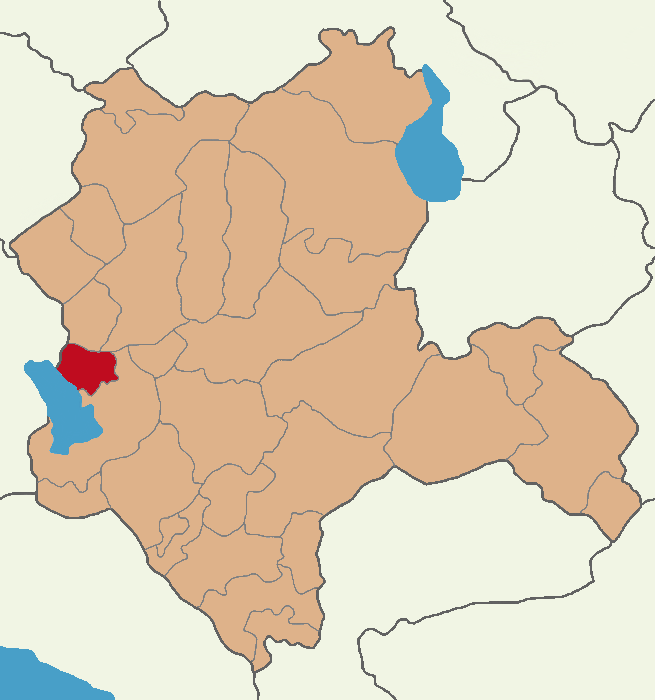
- Map showing Hüyük District in Konya Province

- Location in Turkey Hüyük (Turkey Central Anatolia)
- Coordinates: 37°57′07″N 31°35′45″E
- Country: Turkey
- Province: Konya

Government
  - Mayor: Sadık Sefer (AKP)
- Area: 443 km^{2} (171 sq mi)
- Elevation: 1,250 m (4,100 ft)
- Population (2022): 15,144
  - Density: 34.2/km^{2} (88.5/sq mi)
- Time zone: UTC+3 (TRT)
- Postal code: 42690
- Area code: 0332
- Website: www.huyuk.bel.tr

Hüyük, also Höyük (Turkish: höyük, "tumulus, burial mound"), is a municipality and district of Konya Province, Turkey. Its area is 443 km^{2}, and its population is 15,144 (2022).

== Composition ==
There are 23 neighbourhoods in Hüyük District:

- Akdağ
- Bahçelievler
- Başlamış
- Budak
- Burunsuz
- Çamlıca
- Çavuş
- Çukurkent
- Cumhuriyet
- Değirmenaltı
- Göçeri
- Görünmez
- İlmen
- İmrenler
- Kıreli
- Köşk
- Mutlu
- Pınarbaşı
- Selki
- Suludere
- Tolca
- Ulupınar
- Yenice
