= Emirgazi =

- District and municipality
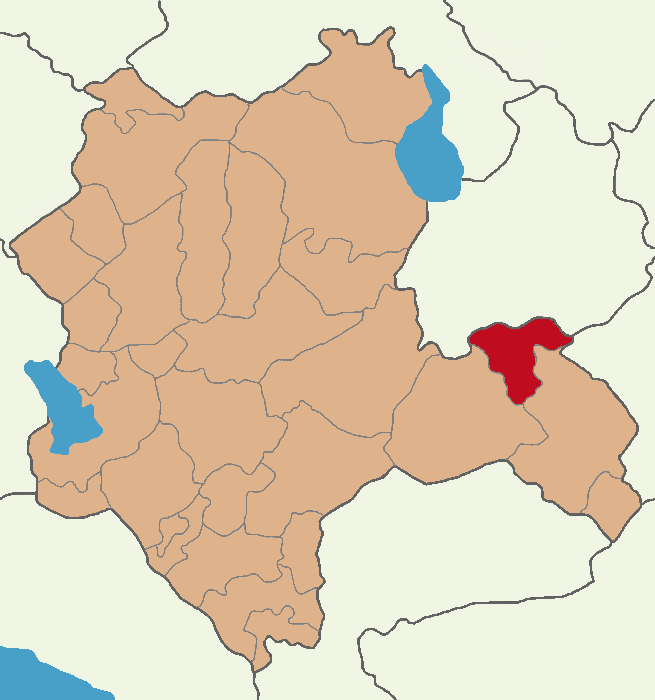
- Map showing Emirgazi District in Konya Province

- Location in Turkey Emirgazi (Turkey Central Anatolia)
- Coordinates: 37°54′08″N 33°50′14″E
- Country: Turkey
- Province: Konya

Government
  - Mayor: Mesut Mertcan (Independent)
- Area: 798 km^{2} (308 sq mi)
- Elevation: 1,078 m (3,537 ft)
- Population (2022): 7,724
  - Density: 9.68/km^{2} (25.1/sq mi)
- Time zone: UTC+3 (TRT)
- Postal code: 42910
- Area code: 0332
- Website: www.emirgazi.bel.tr

Emirgazi is a municipality and district of Konya Province, Turkey. Its area is 798 km^{2}, and its population is 7,724 (2022). Its elevation is 1,078 m (3,537 ft).

== Composition ==
There are 16 neighbourhoods in Emirgazi District:

- Akmescit
- Besci
- Camikebir
- Cumhuriyet
- Demirci
- Fatih
- Gölören
- İkizli
- Işıklar
- Kale
- Karaören
- Meşeli
- Öbektaş
- Türbe
- Yamaçköy
- Yeni
