= Seydişehir =

- District and municipality
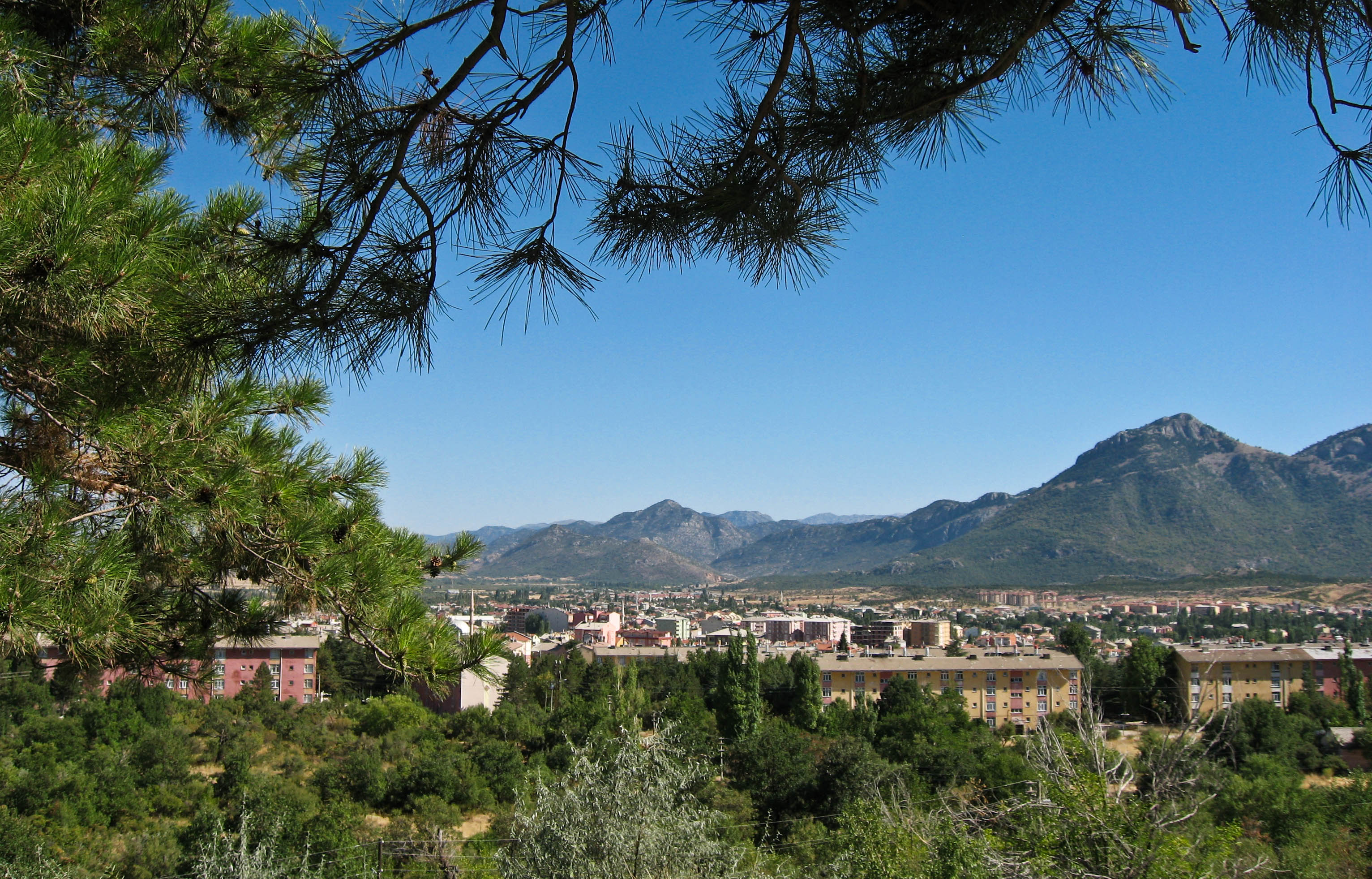
- Seydişehir and Taurus Mountains from Ilıca

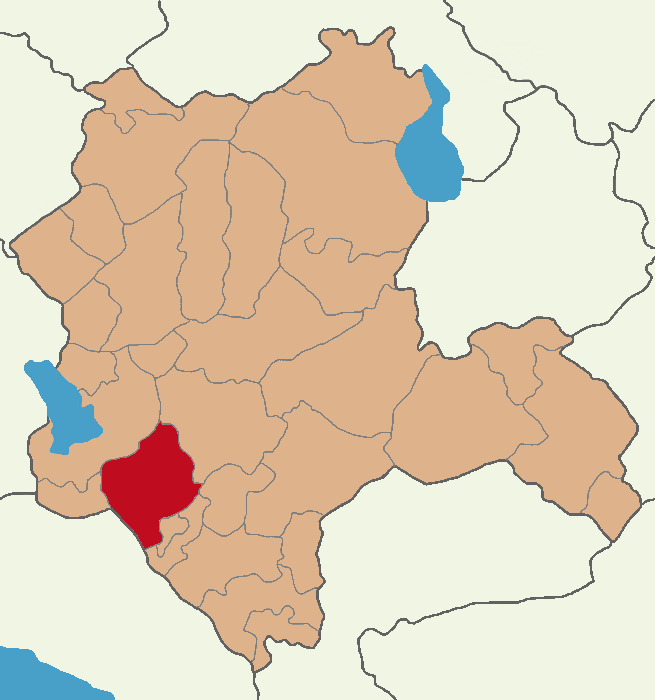
- Map showing Seydişehir District in Konya Province

- Location within Turkey Location within Turkey Central Anatolia
- Coordinates: 37°25′06″N 31°51′02″E
- Country: Turkey
- Province: Konya

Government
  - Mayor: Hasan Ustaoğlu (AKP)
- Area: 1,458 km^{2} (563 sq mi)
- Elevation: 1,130 m (3,710 ft)
- Population (2022): 65,465
  - Density: 44.90/km^{2} (116.3/sq mi)
- Time zone: UTC+3 (TRT)
- Postal code: 42360-42380
- Area code: 0332
- Website: Seydişehir Municipality; Seydişehir District Governorate

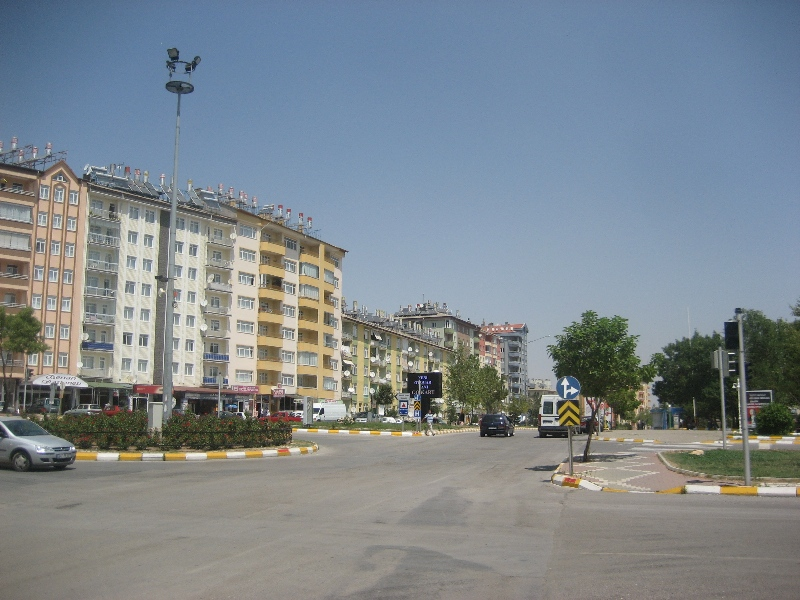
A view from Seydişehir city center

Seydişehir is a municipality and district of Konya Province, Turkey. Its area is 1,458 km^{2}, and its population is 65,465 (2022).

== History ==
Seydişehir has an extensive historical record extending back many centuries. In 5500 BC, Seydişehir bordered the ancient province of Pisidia and some historical building may date to this era. The city is situated in a valley between Lake Trogitis and Lake Karalis. Pre-historic buildings are preserved within the valley. Many artefacts from this era are housed in the Konya Archaeological Museum. In 2000–700 BC, the Hittite conquerors of middle Anatolia left their mark in the way of symbols and handiwork. Rock reliefs found in Seydişehir, believed to be made by the Hittite, support the idea of Hittite's living in the area.

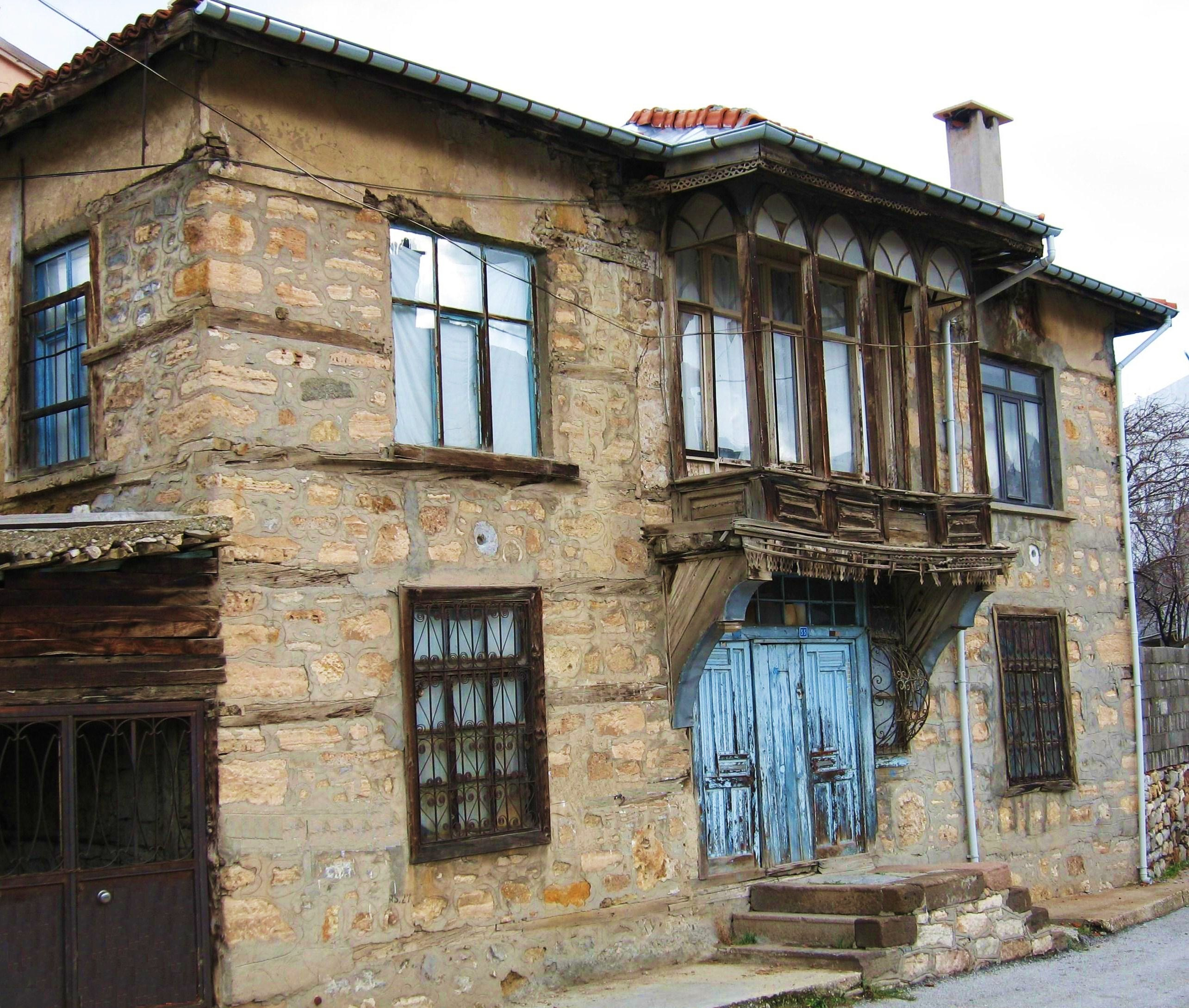
Old house in Seydişehir

== Other ==
Seydişehir is famous for their roasted chickpeas. and for oil wrestling.

== Geography ==
Seydişehir is located south of the city of Konya, and north of the Taurus Mountains.

=== Location ===
	Beyşehir (32 km), Isparta (210 km), İzmir (608 km), Istanbul (670 km)	Konya (89 km), Ankara (350 km)
Derebucak (48 km)
	Akseki (63 km), Manavgat (135 km), Alanya (174 km), Antalya (208 km)	Bozkır (51 km), Karaman (168 km), Mersin (395 km)

=== Composition ===
There are 55 neighbourhoods in Seydişehir District:

- Akçalar
- Aktaş
- Alaylar Bir
- Alaylar Iki
- Anabağlar
- Aşağıkaraören
- Bahçelievler
- Başkaraören
- Bostandere
- Boyalı
- Bükçe
- Çatköy
- Çatmakaya
- Çavuş
- Değirmenci
- Dikilitaş
- Gevrekli
- Gökçehüyük
- Gökhüyük
- Gölyüzü
- Hacıseyidali
- İncesu
- Irmaklı
- Karabulak
- Karacaören
- Karakavak
- Kavakköy
- Kesecik
- Ketenli
- Kızılca
- Kızılcalar
- Kozlu
- Kumluca
- Kuran
- Madenli
- Mesudiye
- Muradiye
- Oğlakçı
- Ortakaraören
- Pınarbaşı
- Saadetler
- Saraycık
- Seyidharun
- Sofuhane
- Stad
- Susuz
- Taraşçı
- Taşağıl
- Tepecik
- Tolköy
- Ufacık
- Ulukapı
- Yaylacık
- Yenicami
- Yenice

=== Climate ===
Seydişehir has a hot-summer Mediterranean climate (Köppen: Csa), with hot, dry summers, and cold, wet winters.

Climate data for Seydişehir (1991–2020)
Month	Jan	Feb	Mar	Apr	May	Jun	Jul	Aug	Sep	Oct	Nov	Dec	Year
Mean daily maximum °C (°F)	4.7 (40.5)	6.7 (44.1)	12.0 (53.6)	17.0 (62.6)	22.2 (72.0)	27.1 (80.8)	31.2 (88.2)	31.3 (88.3)	27.1 (80.8)	20.6 (69.1)	13.2 (55.8)	6.9 (44.4)	18.4 (65.1)
Daily mean °C (°F)	0.3 (32.5)	1.6 (34.9)	6.3 (43.3)	11.0 (51.8)	15.8 (60.4)	20.2 (68.4)	24.0 (75.2)	23.9 (75.0)	19.4 (66.9)	13.5 (56.3)	7.0 (44.6)	2.4 (36.3)	12.2 (54.0)
Mean daily minimum °C (°F)	−3.3 (26.1)	−2.6 (27.3)	1.3 (34.3)	5.3 (41.5)	9.4 (48.9)	13.3 (55.9)	16.5 (61.7)	16.3 (61.3)	11.9 (53.4)	7.2 (45.0)	1.8 (35.2)	−1.2 (29.8)	6.4 (43.5)
Average precipitation mm (inches)	128.4 (5.06)	95.11 (3.74)	74.84 (2.95)	58.13 (2.29)	51.36 (2.02)	29.1 (1.15)	10.09 (0.40)	11.5 (0.45)	20.35 (0.80)	54.25 (2.14)	89.47 (3.52)	146.23 (5.76)	768.83 (30.27)
Average precipitation days (≥ 1.0 mm)	9.1	8.4	7.0	7.2	7.1	4.7	2.4	2.5	3.5	5.2	5.7	9.5	72.3
Average relative humidity (%)	78.8	74.1	65.0	60.4	58.9	54.3	45.9	47.8	52.6	62.9	70.2	78.3	62.3
Source: NOAA

== Notable people ==
- Sadi Irmak (1904–1990), professor of medicine, politician and prime minister
- Mustafa Üstündağ (1933–1983), educator, politician and minister
