= Çeltik =

- District and municipality
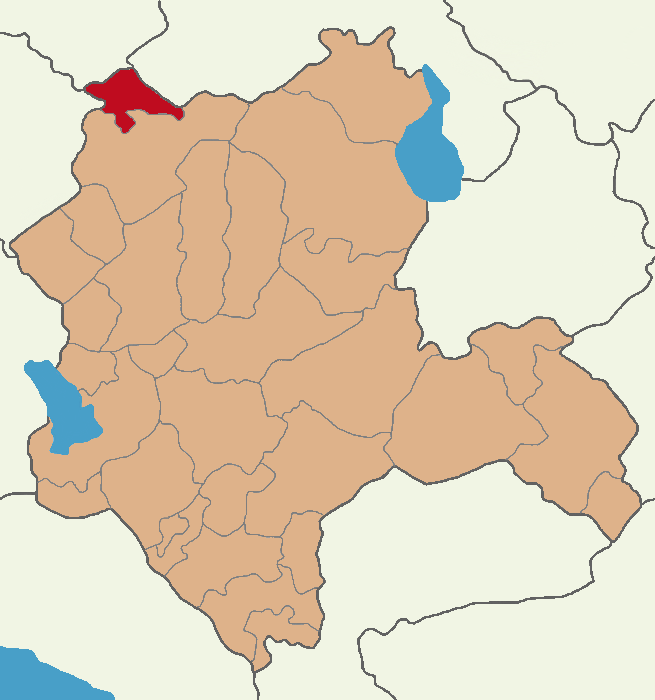
- Map showing Çeltik District in Konya Province

- Location within Turkey Location within Turkey Central Anatolia
- Coordinates: 39°01′28″N 31°47′26″E
- Country: Turkey
- Province: Konya

Government
  - Mayor: Ali Meşe (AKP)
- Area: 640 km^{2} (250 sq mi)
- Elevation: 868 m (2,848 ft)
- Population (2022): 9,429
  - Density: 15/km^{2} (38/sq mi)
- Time zone: UTC+3 (TRT)
- Area code: 0332
- Climate: Csb
- Website: www.celtik.bel.tr

Çeltik (Turkish: çeltik, "paddy, rice in a husk") is a municipality and district of Konya Province, Turkey. Its area is 640 km^{2}, and its population is 9,429 (2022). Its elevation is 868 m (2,848 ft).

== Composition ==
There are 14 neighbourhoods in Çeltik District:

- Adakasım
- Bahçelievler
- Bahçesaray
- Doğanyurt
- Fatih
- Gökpınar
- Honamlı
- İshakuşağı
- Karşıyaka
- Kaşören
- Küçükhasan
- Selçuk
- Torunlar
- Yukarı Aliçomak
