= Ilgın =

- District and municipality
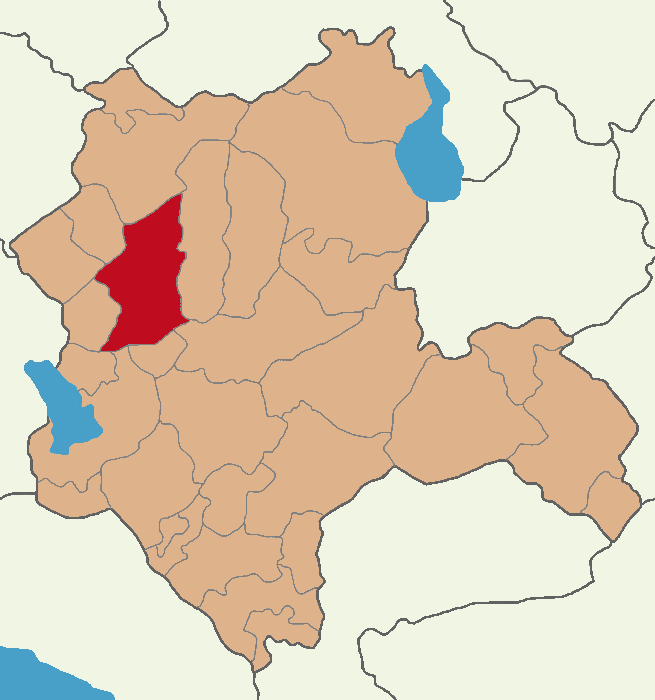
- Map showing Ilgın District in Konya Province

- Location in Turkey Ilgın (Turkey Central Anatolia)
- Coordinates: 38°16′45″N 31°54′50″E
- Country: Turkey
- Province: Konya

Government
  - Mayor: Yalçın Ertaş (AKP)
- Area: 1,636 km^{2} (632 sq mi)
- Elevation: 1,030 m (3,380 ft)
- Population (2022): 53,489
  - Density: 33/km^{2} (85/sq mi)
- Time zone: UTC+3 (TRT)
- Area code: 0332

Ilgın is a municipality and district of Konya Province, Turkey. Its area is 1,636 km^{2}, and its population is 53,489 (2022). Its elevation is 1,030 m (3,380 ft).

== Etymology ==
The name ılgın comes from the former Byzantine name of the city, Lageina.

== Composition ==
There are 56 neighbourhoods in Ilgın District:

- Ağalar
- Argıthanı
- Avdan
- Ayvatdede
- Balkı
- Barakmuslu
- Behlülbey
- Belekler
- Beykonak
- Boğazkent
- Bulcuk
- Büyükoba
- Camiatik
- Çatak
- Çavuşçugöl
- Çiğil
- Çobankaya
- Çömlekçi
- Dereköy
- Dığrak
- Düğer
- Eldeş
- Esentepe
- Fahrettin Altay
- Fatih
- Geçitköy
- Gedikören
- Gökbudak
- Gökçeyurt
- Gölyaka
- Göstere
- Güneypınar
- Harmanyazı
- İhsaniye
- Ilıca
- İstasyon
- Kaleköy
- Kapaklı
- Karaköy
- Mahmuthisar
- Mecidiye
- Milli Egemenlik
- Misafirli
- Olukpınar
- Orhaniye
- Ormanözü
- Sadıkköy
- Sahip Ata
- Sebiller
- Şıhbedrettin
- Şıhcarullah
- Tekeler
- Ucarı
- Yorazlar
- Yukarıçiğil
- Zaferiye

== Climate ==
Ilgın has a transitional dry-summer humid continental climate and Mediterranean climate (Köppen: Dsa/Csa), with hot, dry summers and cold winters.

Climate data for Ilgın (1991–2020)
| Month | Jan | Feb | Mar | Apr | May | Jun | Jul | Aug | Sep | Oct | Nov | Dec | Year |
|---|---|---|---|---|---|---|---|---|---|---|---|---|---|
| Mean daily maximum °C (°F) | 4.9 (40.8) | 7.3 (45.1) | 12.2 (54.0) | 17.3 (63.1) | 22.3 (72.1) | 26.8 (80.2) | 30.8 (87.4) | 30.8 (87.4) | 26.6 (79.9) | 20.5 (68.9) | 13.2 (55.8) | 6.9 (44.4) | 18.4 (65.1) |
| Daily mean °C (°F) | 0.0 (32.0) | 1.7 (35.1) | 5.9 (42.6) | 10.6 (51.1) | 15.3 (59.5) | 19.4 (66.9) | 22.8 (73.0) | 22.5 (72.5) | 18.1 (64.6) | 12.6 (54.7) | 6.3 (43.3) | 2.0 (35.6) | 11.5 (52.7) |
| Mean daily minimum °C (°F) | −4.0 (24.8) | −2.8 (27.0) | 0.6 (33.1) | 4.4 (39.9) | 8.4 (47.1) | 11.6 (52.9) | 14.2 (57.6) | 14.0 (57.2) | 9.9 (49.8) | 6.0 (42.8) | 0.9 (33.6) | −2.0 (28.4) | 5.1 (41.2) |
| Average precipitation mm (inches) | 46.48 (1.83) | 41.96 (1.65) | 43.39 (1.71) | 45.44 (1.79) | 49.72 (1.96) | 36.41 (1.43) | 16.47 (0.65) | 12.72 (0.50) | 17.59 (0.69) | 34.48 (1.36) | 37.39 (1.47) | 51.52 (2.03) | 433.57 (17.07) |
| Average precipitation days (≥ 1.0 mm) | 6.9 | 5.8 | 6.8 | 6.2 | 7.1 | 5.1 | 2.3 | 2.2 | 3.2 | 5.1 | 4.3 | 6.7 | 61.7 |
| Average relative humidity (%) | 76.2 | 70.7 | 63.9 | 60.6 | 60.1 | 56.1 | 49.2 | 50.3 | 54.6 | 63.6 | 69.6 | 75.8 | 62.5 |
Source: NOAA

== Notable natives ==
Famous Turkish folk musician and novelist Zülfü Livaneli was born in Ilgın.
