= Güneysınır =

- District and municipality
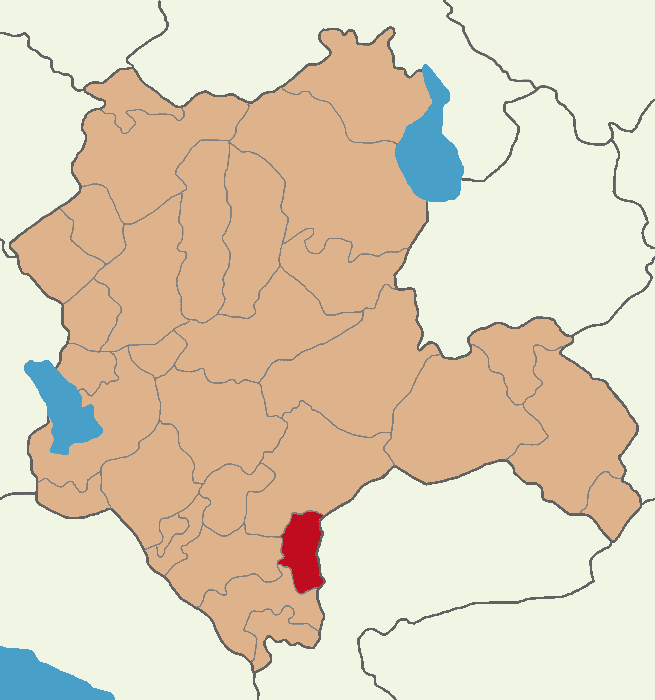
- Map showing Güneysınır District in Konya Province

- Location in Turkey Güneysınır (Turkey Central Anatolia)
- Coordinates: 37°17′53″N 32°43′16″E
- Country: Turkey
- Province: Konya

Government
  - Mayor: Ahmet Demir (AKP)
- Area: 482 km^{2} (186 sq mi)
- Elevation: 1,130 m (3,710 ft)
- Population (2022): 9,266
  - Density: 19/km^{2} (50/sq mi)
- Time zone: UTC+3 (TRT)
- Postal code: 42490
- Area code: 0332
- Website: www.guneysinir.bel.tr

Güneysınır is a municipality and district of Konya Province, Turkey. Its area is 482 km^{2}, and its population is 9,266 (2022).

== Composition ==
There are 18 neighbourhoods in Güneysınır District:

- Avcıtepe
- Aydoğmuş
- Bardas
- Durayda
- Emirhan
- Güneybağ
- Gürağaç
- Habiller
- Karagüney
- Karasınır
- Kayaağzı
- Kızılöz
- Kurukavak
- Mehmetali
- Mevlana
- Ömeroğlu
- Örenboyalı
- Sarıhacı
