= Akören, Konya =

Akören
- District and municipality
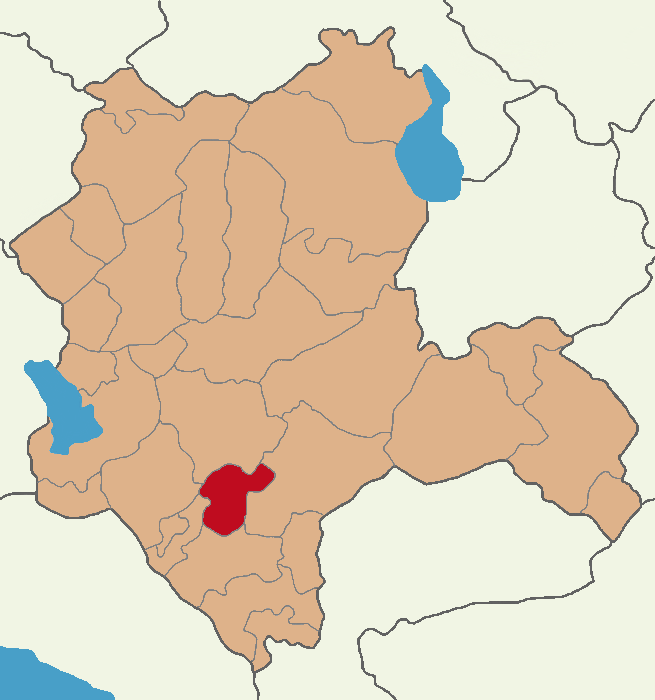
- Map showing Akören District in Konya Province

- Location within Turkey Location within Turkey Central Anatolia
- Coordinates: 37°27′25″N 32°22′10″E
- Country: Turkey
- Province: Konya

Government
  - Mayor: İsmail Arslan (MHP)
- Area: 640 km^{2} (250 sq mi)
- Elevation: 1,097 m (3,599 ft)
- Population (2022): 5,836
  - Density: 9.1/km^{2} (24/sq mi)
- Time zone: UTC+3 (TRT)
- Postal code: 42460
- Area code: 0332
- Climate: Csa
- Website: www.akoren.bel.tr

Akören is a municipality and district of Konya Province, Turkey. Its area is 640 km^{2}, and its population is 5,836 (2022). Its elevation is 1,097 m (3,599 ft).

== Composition ==
There are 14 neighbourhoods in Akören District:

- Ağalar
- Ahmediye
- Alanköy
- Avdan
- Belkuyu
- Çatören
- Dutlu
- Hacılar
- Karahüyük
- Kayasu
- Orhaniye
- Süleymaniye
- Tülce
- Yeni
