= Doğanhisar =

- District and municipality
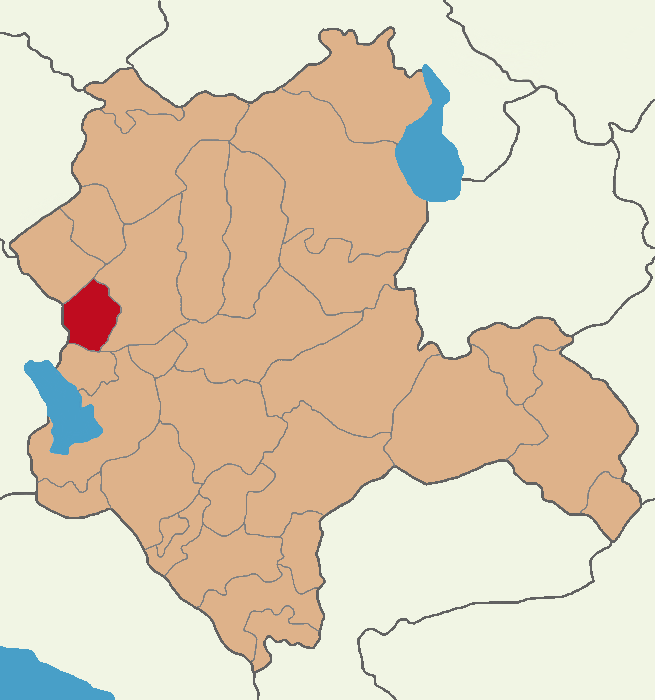
- Map showing Doğanhisar District in Konya Province

- Location in Turkey Doğanhisar (Turkey Central Anatolia)
- Coordinates: 38°08′41″N 31°40′41″E
- Country: Turkey
- Province: Konya

Government
  - Mayor: Süleyman Pekmez (MHP)
- Area: 482 km^{2} (186 sq mi)
- Elevation: 1,200 m (3,900 ft)
- Population (2022): 14,812
  - Density: 31/km^{2} (80/sq mi)
- Time zone: UTC+3 (TRT)
- Area code: 0332
- Website: www.doganhisar.bel.tr

Doğanhisar is a municipality and district of Konya Province, Turkey. Its area is 482 km^{2}, and its population is 14,812 (2022).

== Composition ==
There are 24 neighbourhoods in Doğanhisar District:

- Ağa
- Ayaslar
- Baş
- Başköy
- Çınaroba
- Cuma
- Deştiğin
- Fırınlı
- Güvendik
- Harman
- İlyaslar
- Karaağa
- Kemer
- Koçaş
- Konakkale
- Kuz
- Pazar
- Şıh
- Tekkeköy
- Uncular
- Yazır
- Yazlıca
- Yeğin
- Yenice
