= Bozkır =

District in Konya, Turkey

- District and municipality
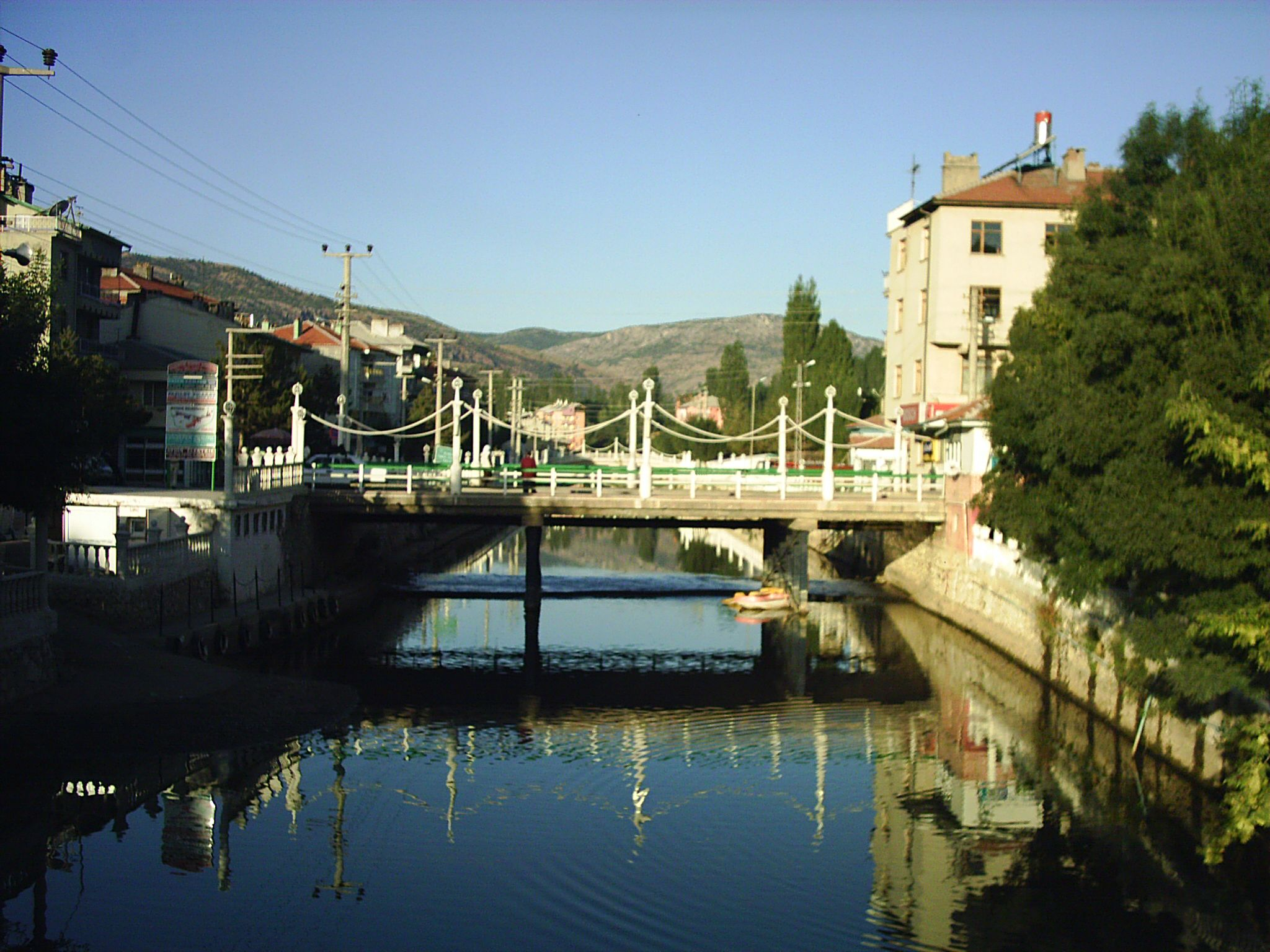

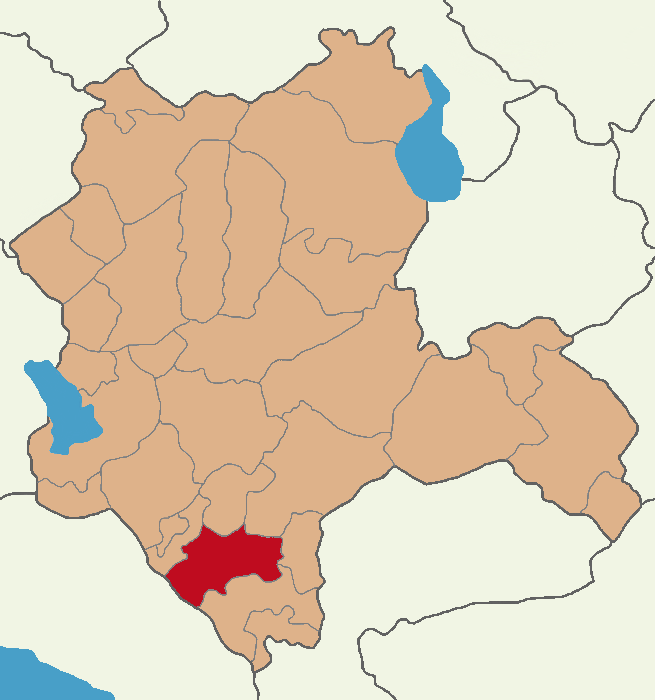
- Map showing Bozkır District in Konya Province

- Location within Turkey Location within Turkey Central Anatolia
- Coordinates: 37°11′19″N 32°14′44″E
- Country: Turkey
- Province: Konya

Government
  - Mayor: Nazif Karabulut (BBP)
- Area: 1,105 km^{2} (427 sq mi)
- Elevation: 1,119 m (3,671 ft)
- Population (2022): 25,307
  - Density: 22.90/km^{2} (59.32/sq mi)
- Time zone: UTC+3 (TRT)
- Postal code: 42630
- Area code: 0332
- Climate: Csa
- Website: www.bozkir.bel.tr

Bozkır is a municipality and district of Konya Province, Turkey. Its area is 1,105 km^{2}, and its population is 25,307 (2022). Its elevation is 1,119 m (3,671 ft).

The town occupied a central position in ancient Isauria. The name Bozkır means steppe in Turkish and after the Turkish settlement in early Anatolian Seljuk Sultanate period, Bozkır was initially the name given to the region extending between the present-day Bozkır town marked by Çarşamba Stream and the lands around neighboring Seydişehir. The name Bozkır was eventually adopted for the town.

== Composition ==
There are 52 neighbourhoods in Bozkır District:

- Akçapınar
- Armutlu
- Arslantaş
- Aydınkışla
- Ayvalıca
- Bağyurdu
- Baybağan
- Bozdam
- Çağlayan
- Cumhuriyet
- Demirasaf
- Dereiçi
- Dereköy
- Elmaağaç
- Hacılar
- Hacıyunuslar
- Hamzalar
- Harmanpınar
- Hisarlık
- Işıklar
- Karabayır
- Karacaardıç
- Karacahisar
- Karayahya
- Kayacılar
- Kayapınar
- Kildere
- Kınık
- Kızılçakır
- Kovanlık
- Kozağaç
- Küçükhisarlık
- Kuşça
- Kuzören
- Pınarcık
- Sarıoğlan
- Sazlı
- Soğucak
- Söğüt
- Sorkun
- Tarlabaşı
- Taşbaşı
- Tepearası
- Tepelice
- Üçpınar
- Ulupınar
- Yalnızca
- Yazdamı
- Yelbeyi
- Yeniköy
- Yolören
- Yukarı
