= Konya Province =

Province of Turkey

Coordinates: 38°00′48″N 32°41′56″E

Konya Province Konya ili
- Province and metropolitan municipality
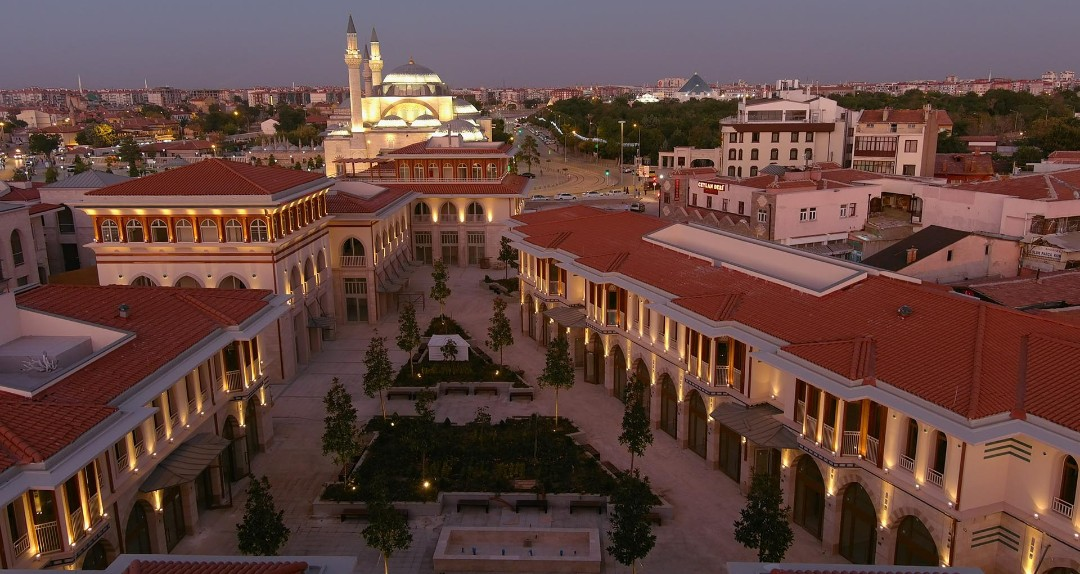
- Konya city as viewed from the Türbeönü Çarşıları

- Location of the province within Turkey
- Country: Turkey
- Seat: Konya

Government
  - Vali: Ibrahim Akın
- Area: 40,838 km^{2} (15,768 sq mi)
- Population (2022): 2,296,347
  - Density: 56.231/km^{2} (145.64/sq mi)
- Time zone: UTC+3 (TRT)
- Area code: 0332
- Website: www.konya.bel.tr www.konya.gov.tr

Konya Province (Turkish: Konya ili) is a province and metropolitan municipality in southwest Central Anatolia, Turkey. Its area is 40,838 km^{2}, making it the largest province by area, and its population is 2,296,347 (2022). The provincial capital is the city of Konya. Its traffic code is 42.

The Kızılören solar power plant in Konya will be able to produce 22.5 megawatts of electricity over an area of 430,000 square meters.

== Geography ==
Köppen map of Konya Province and surrounding regions:
- BSk
- Csa
- Csb
- Dsa
- Dsb
- Dsc

Lake Tuz (Turkish: Tuz Gölü) is the second largest lake in Turkey. It supplies much of the country's salt needs. Lake Beyşehir is on the western side of Konya province in a national park. It is the largest freshwater lake in Turkey and is important for local tourism, attracting thousands of people to its two beaches and twenty-two islands each year.

Konya has several caves in its borders, such as Balatini Cave in Beyşehir, Büyü Düden Cave in Derebucak, Körükini Cave in Beyşehir and Tınaztepe Caves in Seydişehir.

Sille - an old Greek village with a stream running through it

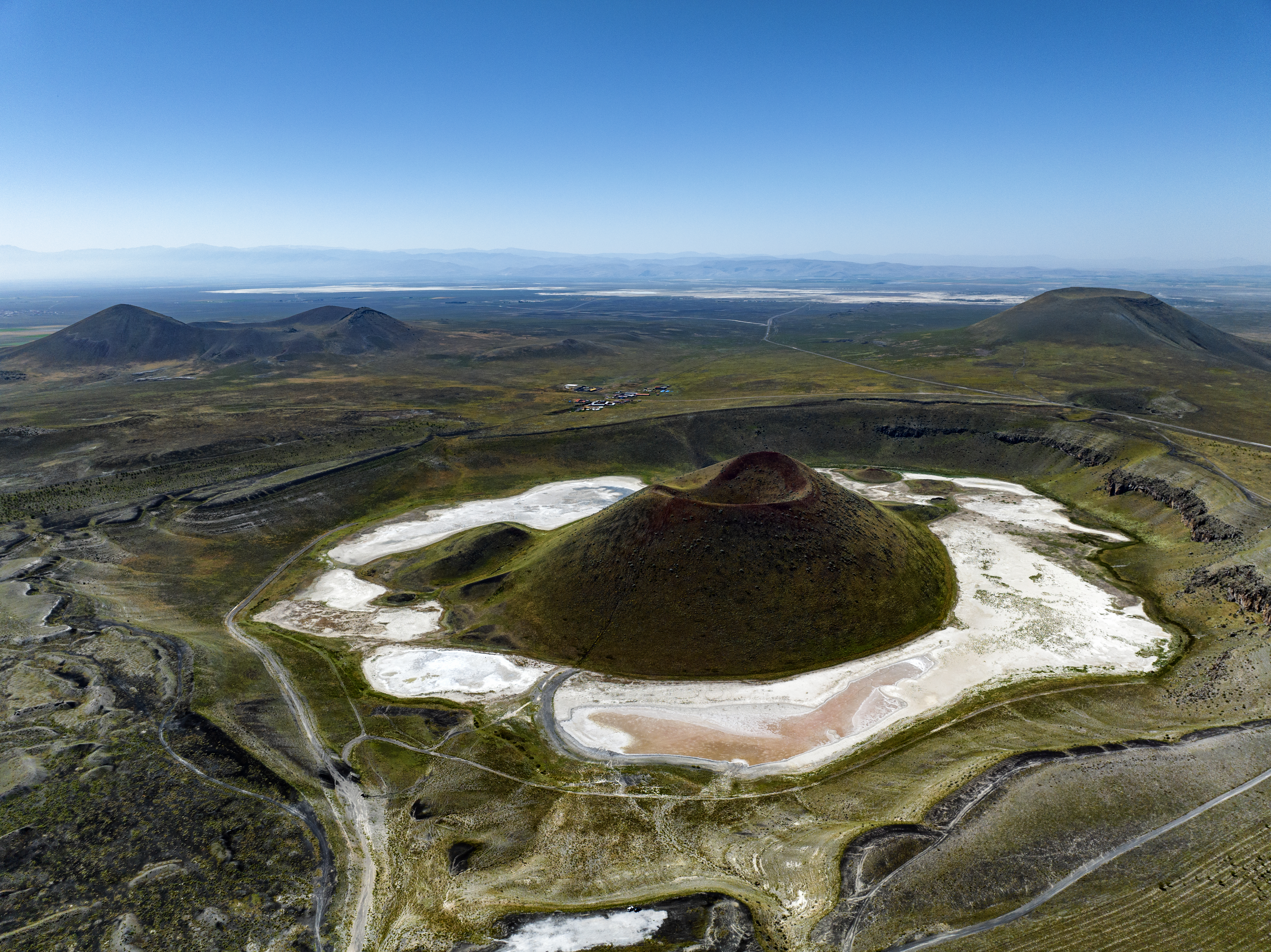
A view from Meke Lake in spring.

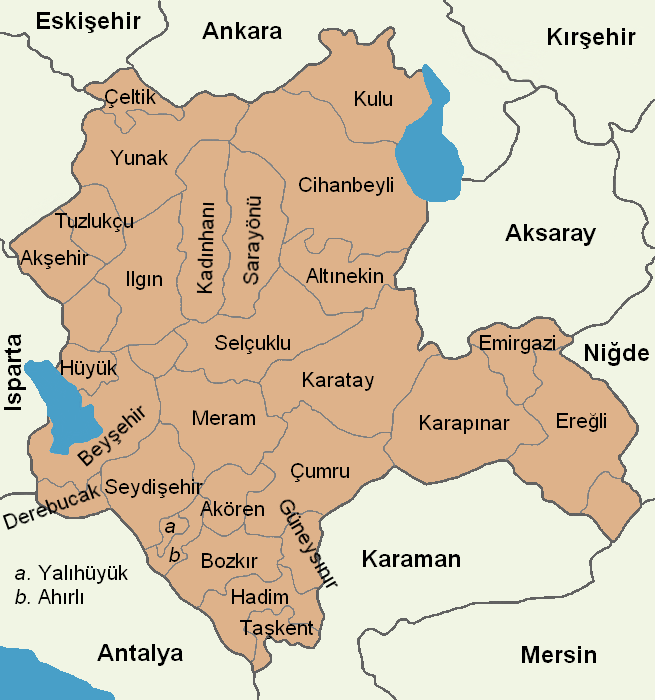
Districts of the province of Konya

== Demographics ==
In 2011 the Konya Metropolitan Municipality had a population close to 1.1 million, out of the 2 million in the Konya Province (76.2% of the population in Konya Province lives in the city, while the remainder live in the villages, sub-districts and districts.)

=== Language census ===
Official first language results (1927-1965)

| Language | 1927 | 1935 | 1945 | 1950 | 1955 | 1960 | 1965 |
|---|---|---|---|---|---|---|---|
| Turkish | 94.8% | 95.3% | 96.1% | 95.7% | 96.6% | 98.7% | 97.3% |
| Kurdish | 4.2% | 4% | 3.8% | 2.6% | 2.9% | 1.1% | 2.5% |
| Circassian | 0.4% | 0.3% | 0.1% | 0.2% | 0.2% | 0.1% | 0.1% |
| Tatar | 0.2% | 0.3% | —N/a | —N/a | —N/a | —N/a | —N/a |
| Albanian | 0.1% | 0% | 0% | 0% | 0% | 0% | 0% |
| Other | 0.2% | 0.1% | 0% | 1.5% | 0.3% | 0% | 0.1% |

== Divisions ==
The province of Konya is divided into thirty-one districts three of which (Meram, Selçuklu and Karatay) form part of Konya city.

- Ahırlı
- Akören
- Akşehir
- Altınekin
- Beyşehir
- Bozkır
- Çeltik
- Cihanbeyli
- Çumra
- Derbent
- Derebucak
- Doğanhisar
- Emirgazi
- Ereğli
- Güneysınır
- Hadim
- Halkapınar
- Hüyük
- Ilgın
- Kadınhanı
- Karapınar
- Karatay
- Kulu
- Meram
- Sarayönü
- Selçuklu
- Seydişehir
- Taşkent
- Tuzlukçu
- Yalıhüyük
- Yunak

The following districts are located in the Mediterranean Region: Ahırlı, Beyşehir, Bozkır, Derebucak, Hadim, Hüyük, Seydişehir, Taşkent, Yalıhüyük.

== Places of interest ==
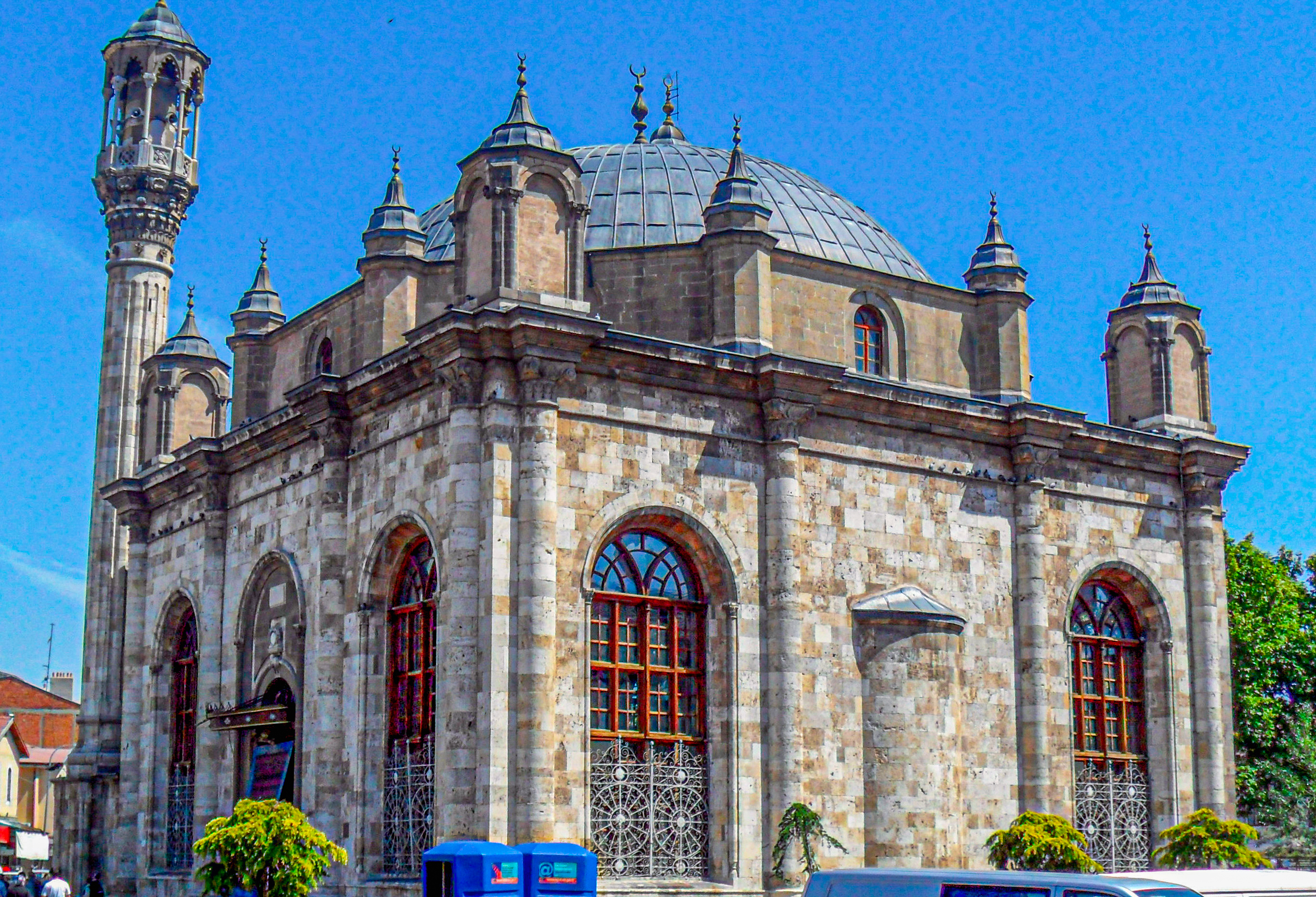
Aziziye Mosque, Konya.

- Akşehir Museum
- Çatalhöyük
- Derebucak Çamlık Caves National Park
- Ince Minaret Madrasa
- Karatay Madrasa
- Konya Archaeological Museum
- Konya Ereğli Museum
- Konya Ethnography Museum
- Konya Tropical Butterfly Garden
- Mevlâna Museum
- Sahib Ata Complex
- Sırçalı Medrese
- Sahip Ata Museum
- TÜYAP Konya International Fair Center

== Gallery ==
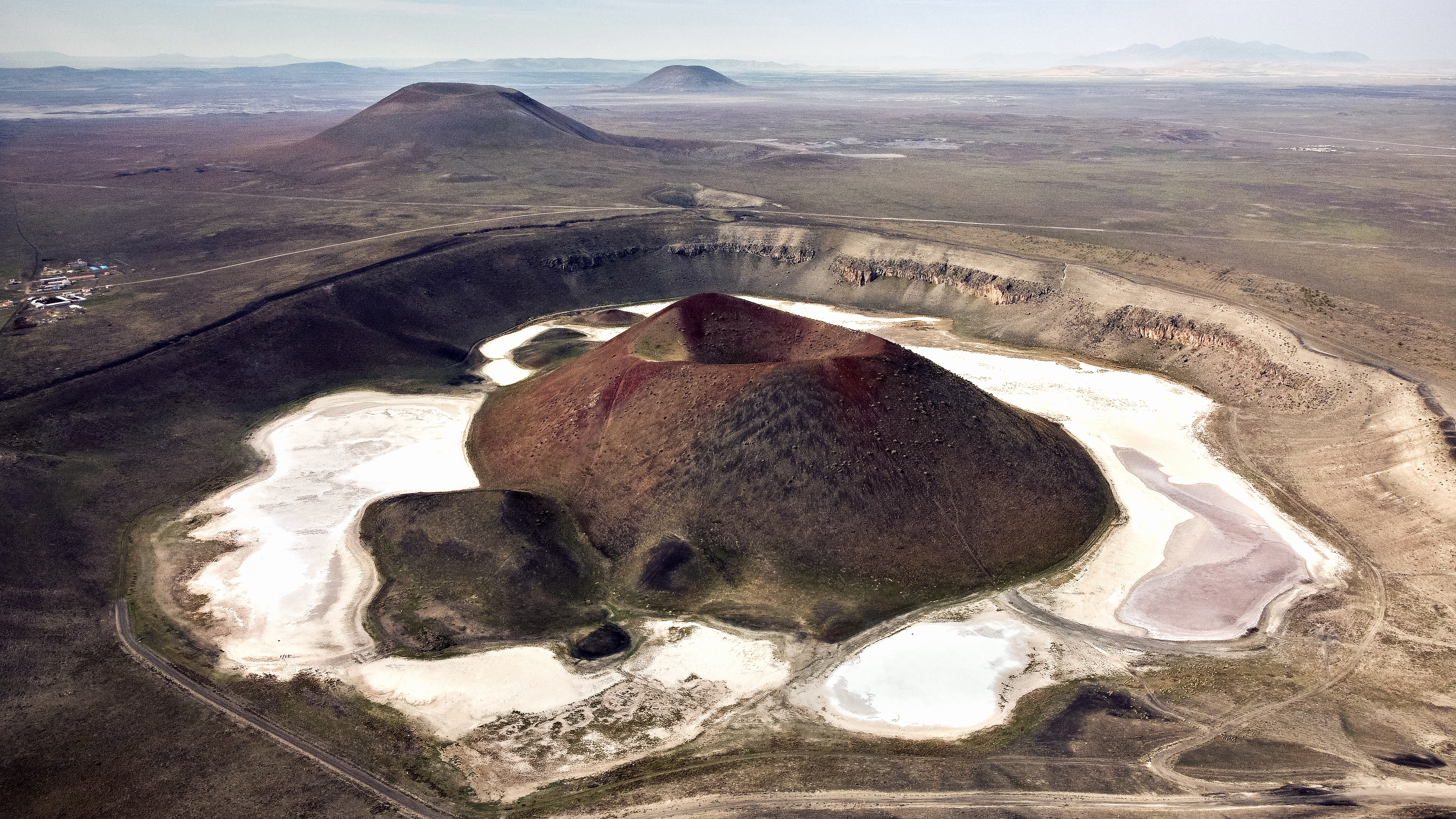
Lake Meke Krater

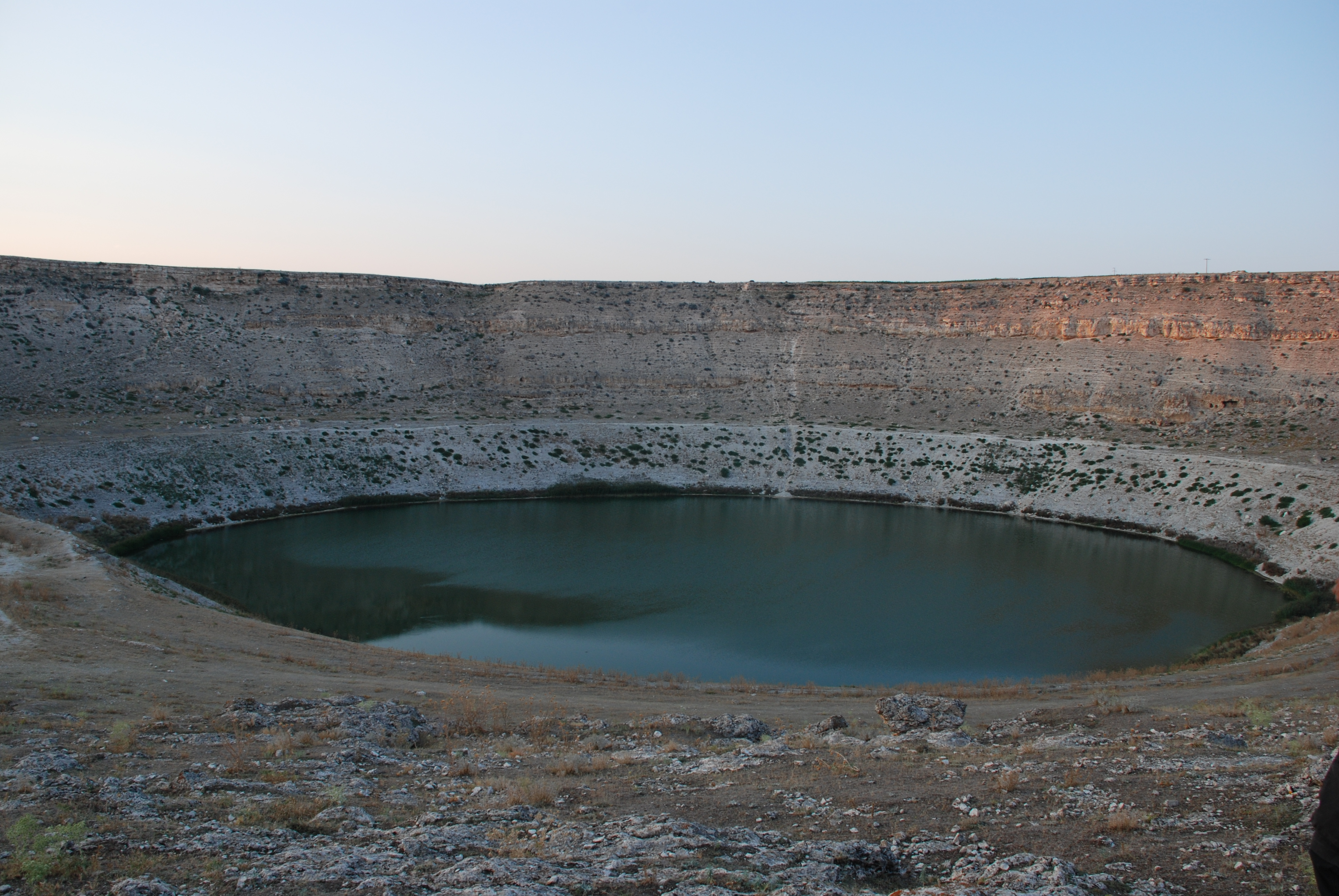
Lake Meyil sinkhole, Obruk Plateau

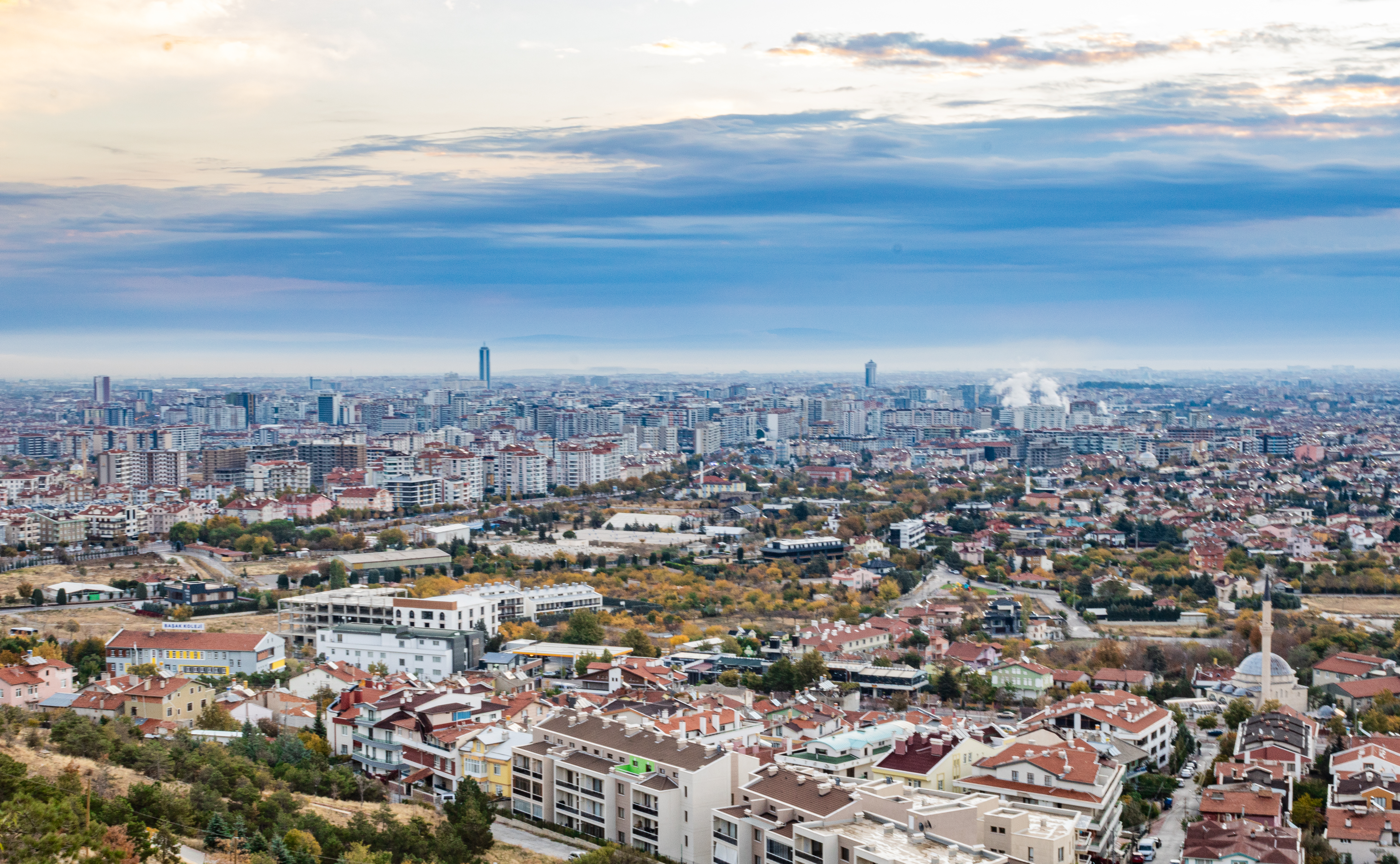
Konya Akyokuş Nature Park Konya Landscape

== See also ==
- Konya Province, Ottoman Empire
- Blue Tunnel Project
