= List of national parks of Turkey =

Protected areas of Turkey
Type	Number	Area (ha)
National parks (list)	48	911,204
Nature parks (list)	261	108,332
Nature preserve areas (list)	31	46,455
Wildlife protection areas (list)	85	1,165,448
Nature monuments (list)	113	8,357
Protected Plains (list)	25	221,229
Wetlands (National)	59	869,697
Wetlands (Local)	32	92,236
Grand total	654	3,422,958
Wetlands (Ramsar) (list)	14	184,487

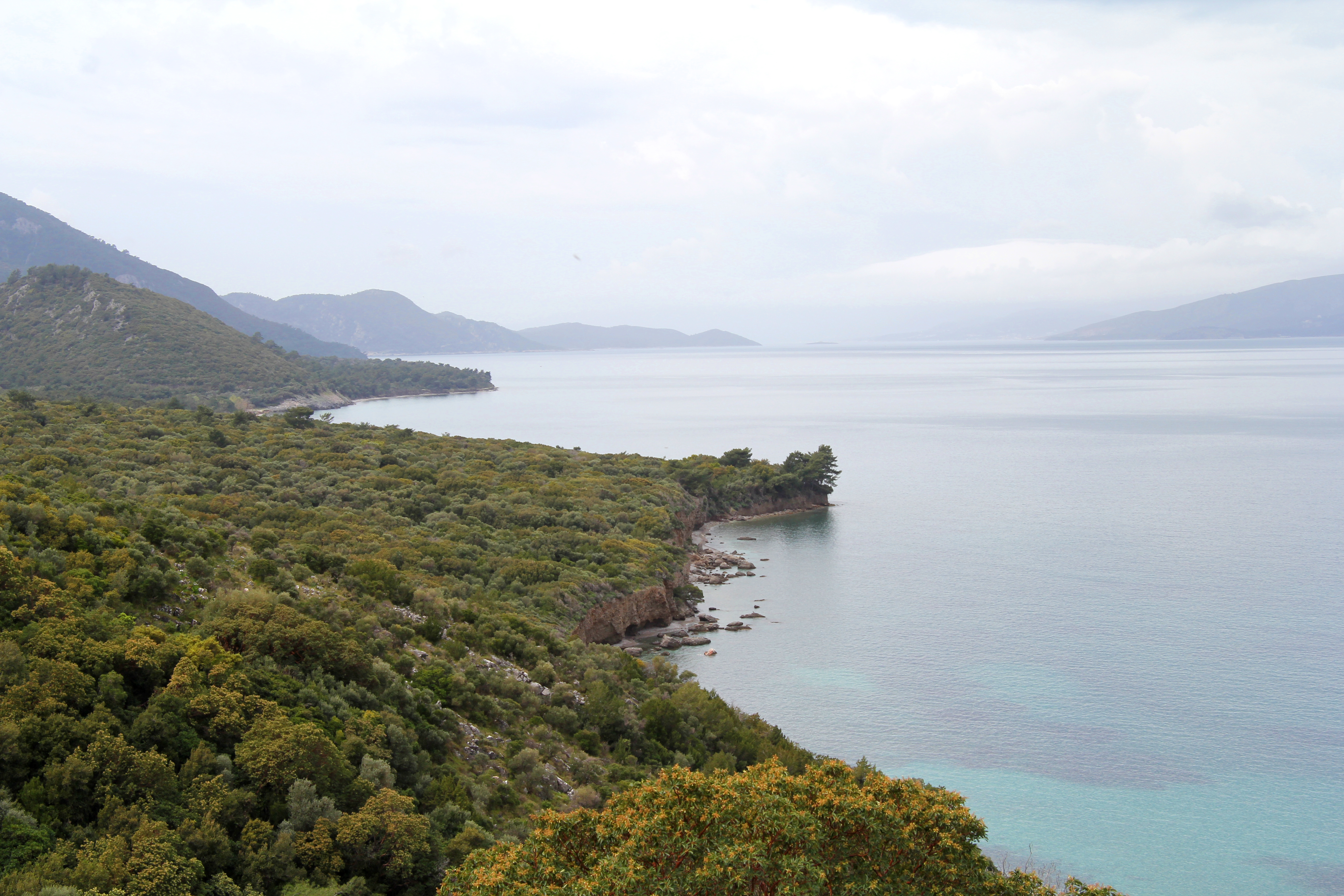
View of Dilek Peninsula-Büyük Menderes Delta National Park.

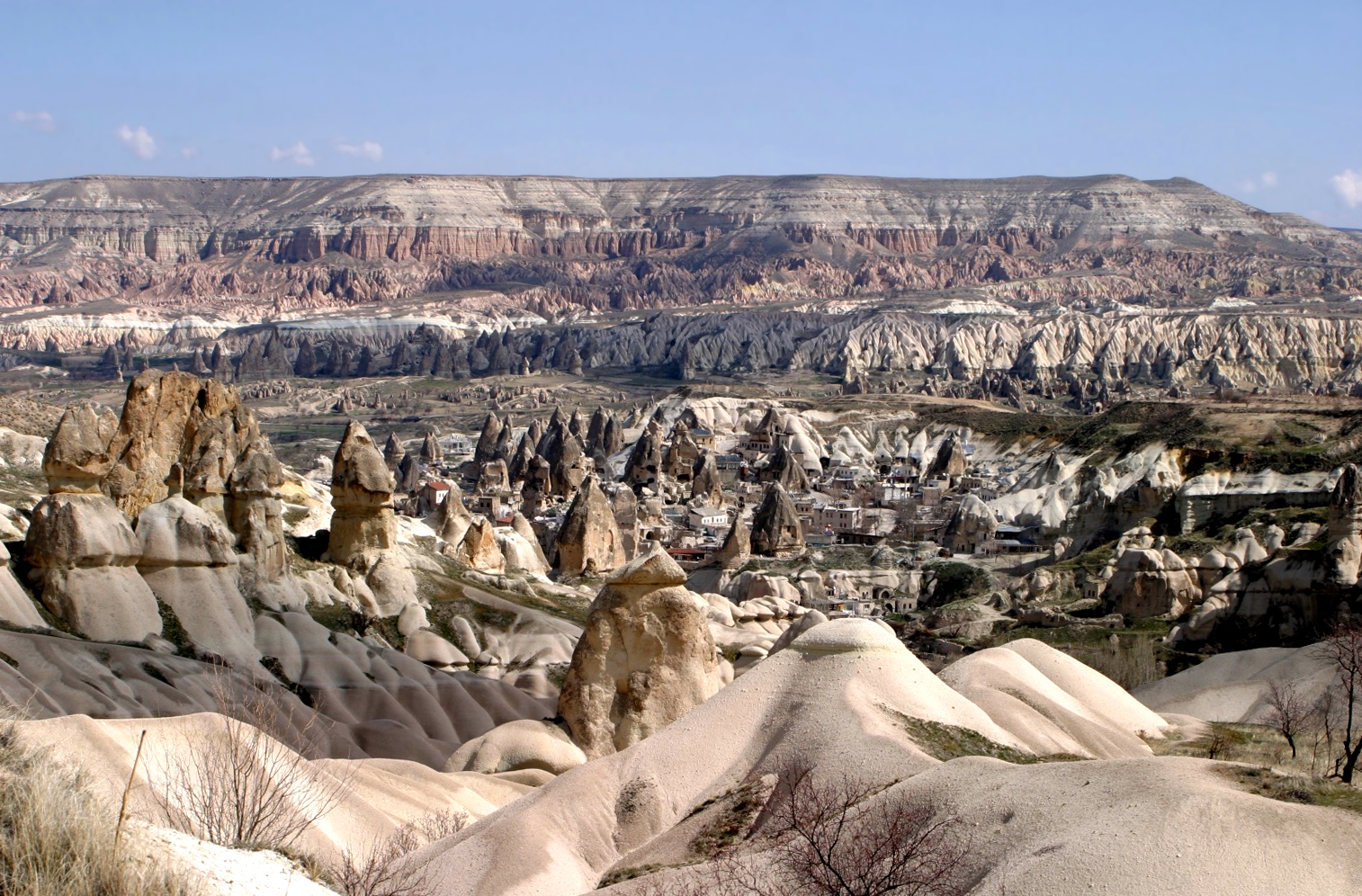
View of Cappadocia landscape

The following is a list of national parks in Turkey.

== History ==
The concept of a national park was introduced for the first time in Turkey by Selahattin İnal, who argued that "nature reserves should have the status of a national park and they should be determined according to natural beauty and touristic potential criteria." The concept was included in the 25th article of the Forest Law adopted on 31 August 1956, and was included in the legal plane for the first time. The General Directorate of Forestry, which is given the responsibility of the national parks by law, is authorized to declare a national park for the purpose of using it as a scientific and public sports and recreation area, provided that the fauna and flora of the forested areas are preserved. Until 1983, only areas that had forest cover fell within the category of national parks, but the National Parks Law, which was adopted on 8 August 1983, new protection statuses such as nature parks, nature preserve areas, and nature monuments were established and areas with historical, touristic or cultural values could now be declared as national parks even if they were not covered by forests. According to the current version of the law, the declaration of a new national park falls within the powers of the Ministry of Agriculture and Forestry, which takes the advice of the Ministry of Environment and Urban Planning on zoning, and the Ministry of Culture and Tourism on historical and touristic matters.

In the cases where the area set to become a national park consists of lands belonging to the public as well as fields belonging to the individuals, the area is taken under the control of the Ministry of Agriculture and Forestry, which can use measures such as expropriation, transfer, allocation or donation under the Expropriation Law. The Ministry of Agriculture and Forestry has the right to organize, manage, or operate national parks. The right to operate is valid only for national parks not covered by the state forests, and the right to operate the state forests cannot be transferred in accordance with article 169 of the constitution. The management of the national parks is directly done by the Directorate of National Parks, a subbranch of the General Directorate of Nature Conservation and National Parks, which itself is controlled by the Ministry of Agriculture and Forestry.

Yozgat Pine Grove National Park, one of the remaining ruins of the ancient forests in Central Anatolia, was declared Turkey's first national park on 5 February 1958. Antalya has the highest number of national parks among the provinces by having five national parks within its boundaries. With a height of 3,000 metres (9,800 ft) and an area of 88,015 hectares (217,490 acres), Mount Ararat National Park is Turkey's largest and highest national park. The last area to be declared a national park was Botan Valley National Park, which was listed on 15 August 2019. Turkey has a total of 44 national parks, which cover an area of 853,383 hectares (2,108,760 acres).

== Key ==
Included in the list of World Heritage Sites in Turkey
Included in the list of Ramsar sites in Turkey

== National parks ==
National parks	Location	Listing date	Area	Reference(s)	Image
Mount Ararat National Park	Ağrı, Iğdır	17 November 2004	88,015 hectares (880.15 km^{2})		
Aladağlar National Park	Adana, Kayseri, Niğde	21 April 1995	55,064 hectares (550.64 km^{2})		
Altınbeşik Cave National Park	Antalya	31 August 1994	1,147 hectares (11.47 km^{2})		
Altındere Valley National Park	Trabzon	9 September 1987	4,468 hectares (44.68 km^{2})		
Commander-in-Chief National Historic Park	Afyon, Kütahya, Uşak	8 November 1981	34,834 hectares (348.34 km^{2})		
Beydağları Coastal National Park	Antalya	16 March 1972	31,166 hectares (311.66 km^{2})		
Derebucak Çamlık Caves National Park	Konya	7 June 2022	1,147 hectares (11.47 km^{2})		
Lake Abant National Park	Bolu	10 June 2022	127 hectares (1.27 km^{2})		
Lake Beyşehir National Park	Konya	11 January 1993	86,855 hectares (868.55 km^{2})		
Boğazköy-Alacahöyük National Park	Çorum	21 September 1988	2,600 hectares (26 km^{2})		
Botan Valley National Park	Siirt	15 August 2019	11,384 hectares (113.84 km^{2})		
Dilek Peninsula-Büyük Menderes Delta National Park	Aydın	19 May 1966	27,598 hectares (275.98 km^{2})		
Hakkari Cilo-Sat Mountains National Park	Hakkâri	26 September 2020	27,500 hectares (275 km^{2})		
Fethiye-Kaş Marine Park	Antalya, Muğla	16 August 2026	2,170,603 hectares (21,706.03 km^{2})		
Lake Gala National Park	Edirne	5 March 2005	6,087 hectares (60.87 km^{2})		
Mount Güllük-Termessos National Park	Antalya	3 November 1970	6,700 hectares (67 km^{2})		
Hatila Valley National Park	Artvin	31 August 1994	16,944 hectares (169.44 km^{2})		
Mount Honaz National Park	Denizli	21 April 1995	9,429 hectares (94.29 km^{2})		
Mount Ilgaz National Park	Çankırı, Kastamonu	2 June 1976	1,118 hectares (11.18 km^{2})		
Mount Sarıçalı National Park	Ankara	21 October 2021	1,024 hectares (10.24 km^{2})		
İğneada Floodplain Forests National Park	Kırklareli	13 November 2007	3,155 hectares (31.55 km^{2})		
Independence Path National Historic Park	Ankara, Çankırı, Kastamonu	2 November 2018	235 hectares (2.35 km^{2})		Not available
Kaçkar Mountains National Park	Artvin, Erzurum, Rize	31 August 1994	52,970 hectares (529.7 km^{2})		
Karagöl-Sahara National Park	Artvin	31 August 1994	3,251 hectares (32.51 km^{2})		
Karatepe-Aslantaş National Park	Osmaniye	29 May 1958	4,143 hectares (41.43 km^{2})		
Kazdağı National Park	Balıkesir	17 April 1994	20,935 hectares (209.35 km^{2})		
Kızıldağ National Park	Isparta	9 May 1969	55,106 hectares (551.06 km^{2})		
Mount Kop Defense National Historic Park	Bayburt, Erzurum	15 November 2016	6,335 hectares (63.35 km^{2})		
Lake Kovada National Park	Isparta	3 November 1970	6,551 hectares (65.51 km^{2})		
Köprülü Canyon National Park	Antalya	12 December 1973	35,719 hectares (357.19 km^{2})		
Kuşcenneti National Park	Balıkesir	27 July 1959	17,058 hectares (170.58 km^{2})		
Küre Mountains National Park	Bartın, Kastamonu	7 July 2000	37,753 hectares (377.53 km^{2})		
Battle of Manzikert National Historic Park	Muş	5 February 2018	238 hectares (2.38 km^{2})		Not available
Marmaris National Park	Muğla	8 March 1996	29,206 hectares (292.06 km^{2})		
Munzur Valley National Park	Tunceli	21 December 1971	42,674 hectares (426.74 km^{2})		
Mount Nemrut National Park	Adıyaman, Malatya	7 December 1988	13,827 hectares (138.27 km^{2})		
Nene Hatun National Historic Park	Erzurum	6 June 2009	387 hectares (3.87 km^{2})		Not available
North Aegean Marine Park	Çanakkale, Edirne	16 August 2026	174,214 hectares (1,742.14 km^{2})		
Battle of Sakarya National Historic Park	Ankara	8 February 2015	13,850 hectares (138.5 km^{2})		
Saklıkent National Park	Antalya, Muğla	6 June 1996	1,643 hectares (16.43 km^{2})		
Sarıkamış-Allahuekber Mountains National Park	Erzurum, Kars	19 October 2004	22,520 hectares (225.2 km^{2})		
Soğuksu National Park	Ankara	19 February 1959	1,186 hectares (11.86 km^{2})		
Mount Sipylus National Park	İzmir, Manisa	22 April 1968	6,801 hectares (68.01 km^{2})		
Sultan Reedy National Park	Kayseri	17 March 2006	24,358 hectares (243.58 km^{2})		
Tek Tek Mountains National Park	Şanlıurfa	29 May 2007	19,335 hectares (193.35 km^{2})		
Ancient Troy National Park	Çanakkale	7 November 1996	13,517 hectares (135.17 km^{2})		
Uludağ National Park	Bursa	20 September 1961	13,024 hectares (130.24 km^{2})		
Yedigöller National Park	Bolu	29 April 1965	1,623 hectares (16.23 km^{2})		
Yozgat Pine Grove National Park	Yozgat	5 February 1958	267 hectares (2.67 km^{2})		Not available
Yumurtalık Lagoon National Park	Adana	6 December 2008	16,980 hectares (169.8 km^{2})		

== National parks by province ==
Province	No.	National parks
Antalya	5	Altınbeşik Cave National Park, Beydağları Coastal National Park, Mount Güllük-Termessos National Park, Köprülü Canyon National Park, Saklıkent National Park
Ankara	4	Independence Path National Historic Park, Battle of Sakarya National Historic Park, Soğuksu National Park, Mount Sarıçalı National Park
Artvin	3	Hatila Valley National Park, Kaçkar Mountains National Park, Karagöl-Sahara National Park
Erzurum	4	Kaçkar Mountains National Park, Mount Kop Defensive National Historic Park, Nene Hatun National Historic Park, Sarıkamış-Allahuekber Mountains National Park
Hakkâri	1	Hakkari Cilo-Sat Mountains National Park
Kastamonu	3	Mount Ilgaz National Park, Independence Path National Historic Park, Küre Mountains National Park
Adana	2	Aladağlar National Park, Yumurtalık Lagoon National Park
Balıkesir	2	Kazdağı National Park, Kuşcenneti National Park
Çankırı	2	Mount Ilgaz National Park, Independence Path National Historic Park
Isparta	2	Kızıldağ National Park, Lake Kovada National Park
Kayseri	2	Aladağlar National Park, Sultan Reedy National Park
Muğla	2	Marmaris National Park, Saklıkent National Park
Adıyaman	1	Mount Nemrut National Park
Afyon	1	Commander-in-Chief National Historic Park
Ağrı	1	Mount Ararat National Park
Aydın	1	Dilek Peninsula-Büyük Menderes Delta National Park
Bartın	1	Küre Mountains National Park
Bayburt	1	Mount Kop Defensive National Historic Park
Bolu	2	Yedigöller National Park, Lake Abant National Park
Bursa	1	Uludağ National Park
Çanakkale	1	Ancient Troy National Park
Çorum	1	Boğazköy-Alacahöyük National Park
Denizli	1	Mount Honaz National Park
Edirne	1	Lake Gala National Park
Iğdır	1	Mount Ararat National Park
İzmir	1	Mount Sipylus National Park
Kars	1	Sarıkamış-Allahuekber Mountains National Park
Kırklareli	1	İğneada Floodplain Forests National Park
Konya	2	Lake Beyşehir National Park, Derebucak Çamlık Caves National Park
Kütahya	1	Commander-in-Chief National Historic Park
Malatya	1	Mount Nemrut National Park
Manisa	1	Mount Sipylus National Park
Muş	1	Battle of Manzikert National Historic Park
Niğde	1	Aladağlar National Park
Osmaniye	1	Karatepe-Aslantaş National Park
Rize	1	Kaçkar Mountains National Park
Siirt	1	Botan Valley National Park
Şanlıurfa	1	Tek Tek Mountains National Park
Trabzon	1	Altındere Valley National Park
Tunceli	1	Munzur Valley National Park
Uşak	1	Commander-in-Chief National Historic Park
Yozgat	1	Yozgat Pine Grove National Park

== Former national parks ==
Name	Province	Listing date	Delisting date	Area	Location	Reference(s)	Image	Notes
Gallipoli Peninsula National Historic Park	Çanakkale	26 May 1973	28 June 2014	334.39 km^{2}	List of national parks of Turkey is located in Turkey			Status changed to special administration under "Gallipoli War Historical Site Directorate".
Göreme National Park	Nevşehir	25 November 1986	22 October 2019	96.14 km^{2}	List of national parks of Turkey is located in Turkey			Status changed to special administration under "Cappadocia Area Administration".

== Map ==
Location of the national parks of Turkey on map.
