= Çamlık =

Çamlık can refer to:

- Çamlık, Bartın
- Çamlık, Çaycuma
- Çamlık, Derebucak
- Çamlık, Giresun
- Çamlık, Mudanya
- Çamlık, Yeniçağa
- Çamlık Railway Museum
- Çamlık railway station
- Derebucak Çamlık Caves National Park
