= Derebucak =

- District and municipality
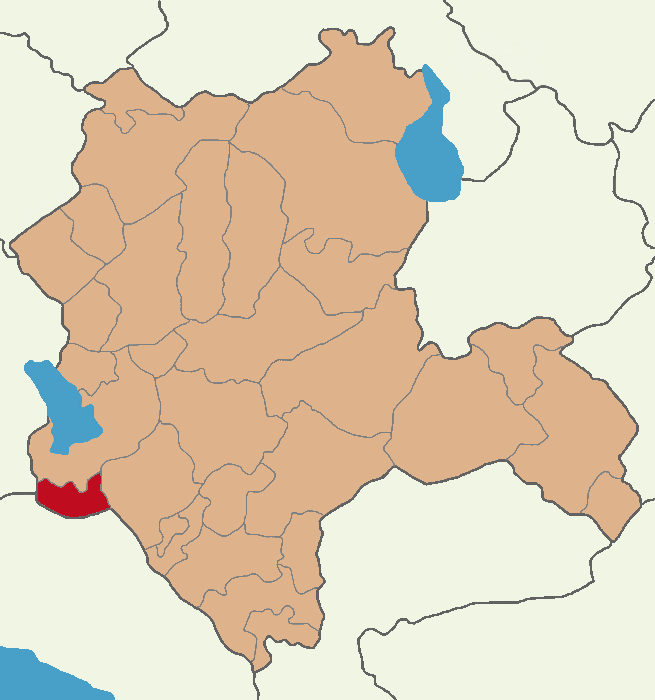
- Map showing Derebucak District in Konya Province

- Location in Turkey Derebucak (Turkey Central Anatolia)
- Coordinates: 37°23′37″N 31°30′27″E
- Country: Turkey
- Province: Konya

Government
  - Mayor: Ahmet Kısa (AKP)
- Area: 451 km^{2} (174 sq mi)
- Elevation: 1,230 m (4,040 ft)
- Population (2022): 5,690
  - Density: 12.6/km^{2} (32.7/sq mi)
- Time zone: UTC+3 (TRT)
- Area code: 0332

Derebucak is a municipality and district of Konya Province, Turkey. Its area is 451 km^{2}, and its population is 5,690 (2022).

The 2022-established Derebucak Çamlık Caves National Park contains a group of 13 caves and sinkholes in Çamlık village. The cave were registered as a natural monument.

== Composition ==
There are 12 neighbourhoods in Derebucak District:

- Çamlık
- Durak
- Gencek
- Göynem
- Kenankuyu
- Musalla
- Pınarbaşı
- Sarayönü
- Taşlıpınar
- Tepearası
- Uğurlu
- Yeni
