= Battle of Sakarya National Historic Park =

Historical park in Ankara, Turkey

- Sakarya Meydan Muharebesi Tarihi Milli Parkı
- Location: Ankara, Turkey
- Established: February 8, 2015
- Governing body: Ministry of Forest and Water Management
- Website: www.milliparklar.gov.tr/mp/sakaryameydanmuharebesi/index.htm

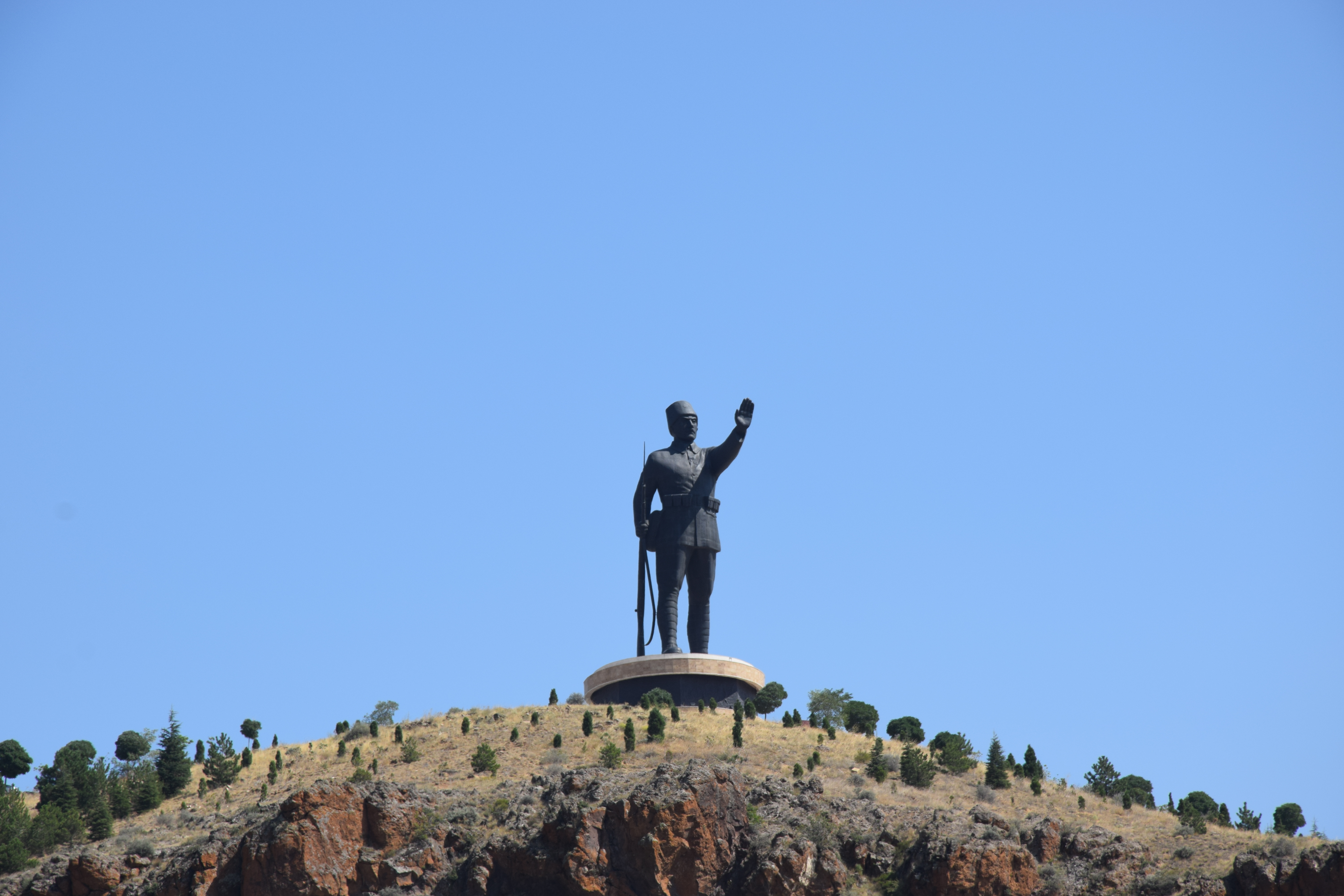

Battle of Sakarya National Historic Park (Turkish: Sakarya Meydan Muharebesi Tarihi Milli Parkı), established on February 8, 2015, is a protected area of national historic significance associated with the Turkish War of Independence (Turkish: İstiklâl Savaşı) comprising the battleground of the Battle of Sakarya (Turkish: Sakarya Meydan Muharebesi) in the Greco-Turkish War (1919–22). It is located in the Polatlı and Haymana districts of Ankara Province.

== See also ==
- Commander-in-Chief National Historic Park
