= Mount Kop Defense National Historic Park =

Protected national historic site in eastern Turkey

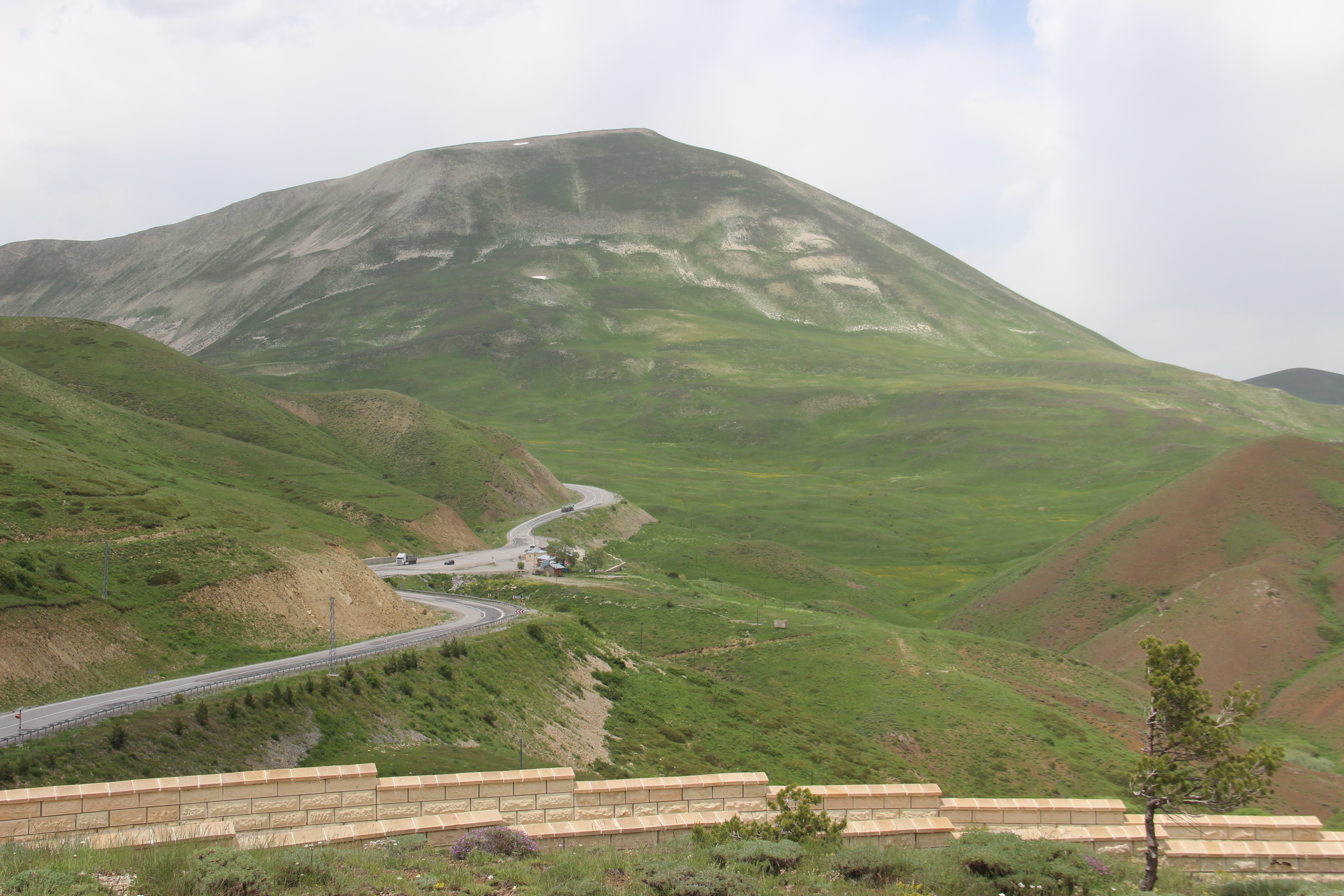

- Location within Turkey
- Location: Mount Kop
- Nearest city: Bayburt - Altıntaş, Aşkale, Erzurum
- Coordinates: 40°01′37″N 40°31′10″E
- Area: 6.335 ha (15.65 acres)
- Established: 31 October 2016; 9 years ago
- Designated
- Operator: General Directorate of Nature Conservation and National Parks (Ministry of Agriculture and Forestry)

Mount Kop Defense National Historic Park (Turkish: Kop Dağı Müdafaası Tarihî Millî Parkı) is a protected national historic site located between the provinces Bayburt and Erzurum in eastern Turkey dedicated to the events during the defense of Mount Kop against the Imperial Russian Army in the World War I. It was established in 2016.

== Overview ==
The national historic park is located between the Kop village of Bayburt and Altıntaş village of Aşkale district in Erzurum Province. Its distance to Bayburt is 45 km (28 mi) and to Erzurum is 75 km (47 mi). Covering an area of around 6,335 ha (15,650 acres), it was established as the 42nd national park of Turkey on 31 October 2016, on the 100th anniversary of the defensive battle of the Ottoman Army at this site. Fifty-five percent of the park area is located in Bayburt Province and 45% in Erzurum Province. The park is operated by the General Directorate of Nature Conservation and National Parks of the Ministry of Agriculture and Forestry.

== Historical background ==
The site is an important place of the struggle known as the "Bayburt-Kop Defense" within the Çoruh Defensive Front, where the Ottoman Third Army defeated the Imperial Russian Army during World War I. After the Russian troops captured Erzurum on 16 February 1916, the defense battles, fought in and in mountainous area around Bayburt under the command of the V Corps Fevzi Çakmak between 20 March and 15 July 1916, changed the course of the Eastern Front. The Russian Army had to retreat. The Turkish side suffered 9,700 dead and 15,000 wounded. The battlefield is situated in an area at elevation between 2,400–2,980 m (7,870–9,780 ft). Traces left by gun carriages of the artillery and trenches on the battlefield survived without any deterioration except for climate factors. The trenches were even identifiable in original form on the satellite images. War materials such as large quantities of bullets, pieces of shrapnel shell, pieces of military uniforms and army supplies belonging to both belligerents were found. In addition, the area contains burial places.

== National historic park ==
A monument is situated on the summit of Mount Kop dedicated to the fallen Ottoman soldiers, who resisted the Russians in Kop Pass and Çoruh Basin in 1916. Made of ashlar, concrete and marble, the monument was erected in 1963. Part of the national historic park was declared as Mount Kop Tourism Area on 17 October 1993. In 2018, construction works began to restore the war graves, found as individual and mass graves using ground-penetrating radar, and the battle positions, as well as to build a visitor center and a museum with a covered area of 1,000 m^{2} (11,000 sq ft) across the monument. Simulation of the events during the battle is offered to the visitors. In addition, social facilities including an outdoor restaurant were added.

== Geological structure ==
Kop Mountains are located in the axis zone of the Pontide tectonic belt. The basement rocks of the region are represented by pre-Jurassic, small-scale metamorphic masses, generally composed of gneiss, schist and amphibolites, which includes dunite, harzburgite, lherzolite, wehrlite, pyroxenite and abbro giving outcrop over large areas.

== Biota ==
=== Fauna ===
Kop Mountain is one of Turkey's richest habitats for butterflies. It hosts 134 butterfly species, 10 of which are endemic and 37 of which are rare. Other important animal species include mammals like lynx, bears, foxes, and wolves.

=== Flora ===
Mount Kop is home to an endangered and endemic species of plant, Stachys bayburtensis.
