= Yumurtalık Lagoon =

Ramsar site

Coordinates: 36°48′44.83″N 35°50′38.40″E

- Turkish: Yumurtalık Lagünü
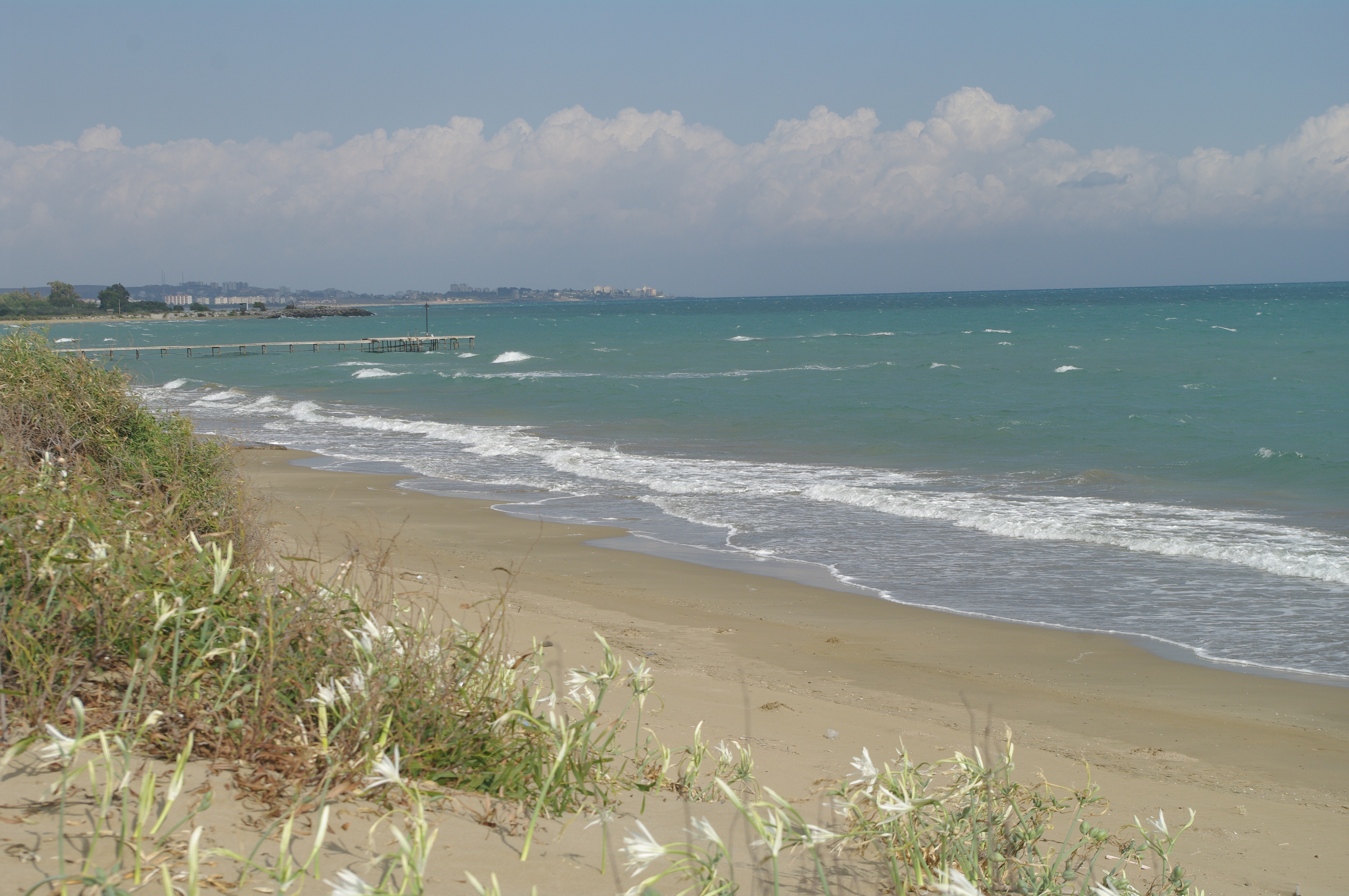
- Yumurtalık Lagoon
- Area: 19,853 ha (76.65 sq mi)
Designations
Ramsar Wetland
- Official name: Yumurtalik Lagoons
- Designated: 21 July 2005
- Reference no.: 1619

Yumurtalık Lagoon (Turkish: Yumurtalık Lagünü) is a lagoon located in Adana Province, southern Turkey. The area is a nature reserve, a national park, and is a Ramsar site.

== Description ==
The lagoon is an alluvial delta by rivers in the eastern Mediterranean Sea. It is one of four lagoons in the Çukurova Delta. It has 19,853 ha (49,060 acres). The conservation area lies along the Taurus and Amanos mountain chains. The area has both freshwater and coastal habitats, including vegetation of sand dune, salt marsh, stream bank, and ruderal types. It is a key stopover and wintering site for migratory birds on the Palaearctic-Africa route. Threatened species of turtles such as Caretta caretta and Chelonia mydas make their home in the lagoon; Yumurtalık Lagoon is the only known wintering site for the green sea turtle in the Mediterranean.

== Conservation ==
The site was designated as a Natural SIT Area 1st degree under the Conservation Law on Cultural and Natural Assets in 1993. In 1994, it was declared a Nature Conservation Site under the Law on National Parks. On July 21, 2005, it was added to the Ramsar Convention List.
