= Botan Valley National Park =

Largest and the most biodiverse national park in Turkey

- Botan Vadisi Milli Parkı
- IUCN category II (national park)
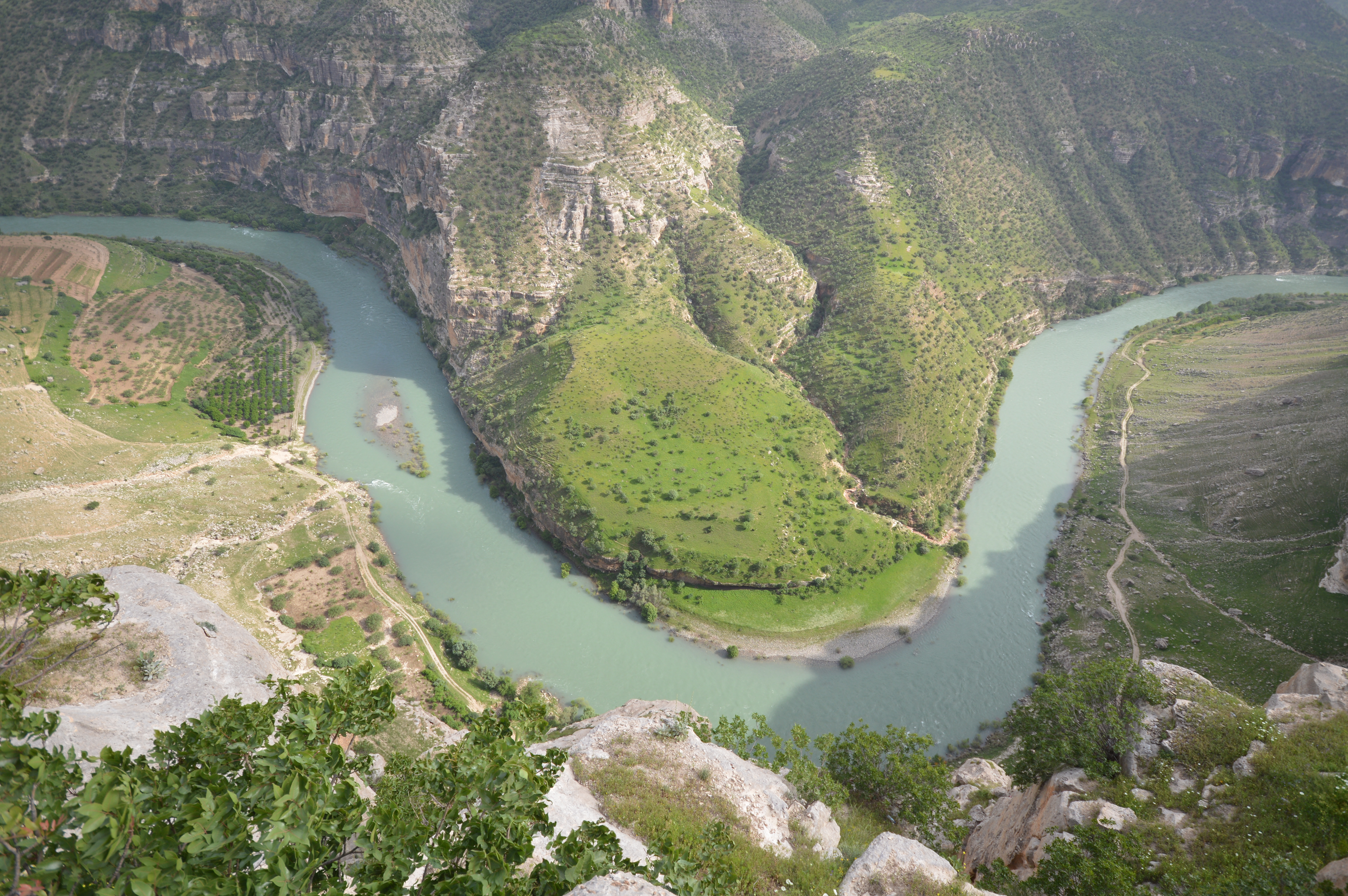

- Location within Turkey
- Location: Siirt Province, Turkey
- Nearest city: Siirt
- Coordinates: 37°53′51.6″N 41°57′9.5″E
- Established: August 15, 2019; 6 years ago
- Governing body: Directorate-General of Nature Protection and National Parks; Ministry of Environment and Forest

The Botan Valley National Park (Turkish: Botan Vadisi Milli Parkı), is a historical area with the status of a national park within the borders of Siirt province of Turkey.

According to the decision published in the Resmî Gazete on August 15, 2019, it was declared a national park.

== Geography ==
Botan Valley, located in the central, Tillo and Eruh districts, consists of 120 thousand acres and 29 kilometers of routes and is also suitable for sports such as paragliding and rafting.
