= Lake Gala National Park =

National park in Edirne, Turkey

- Gala Gölü Milli Parkı
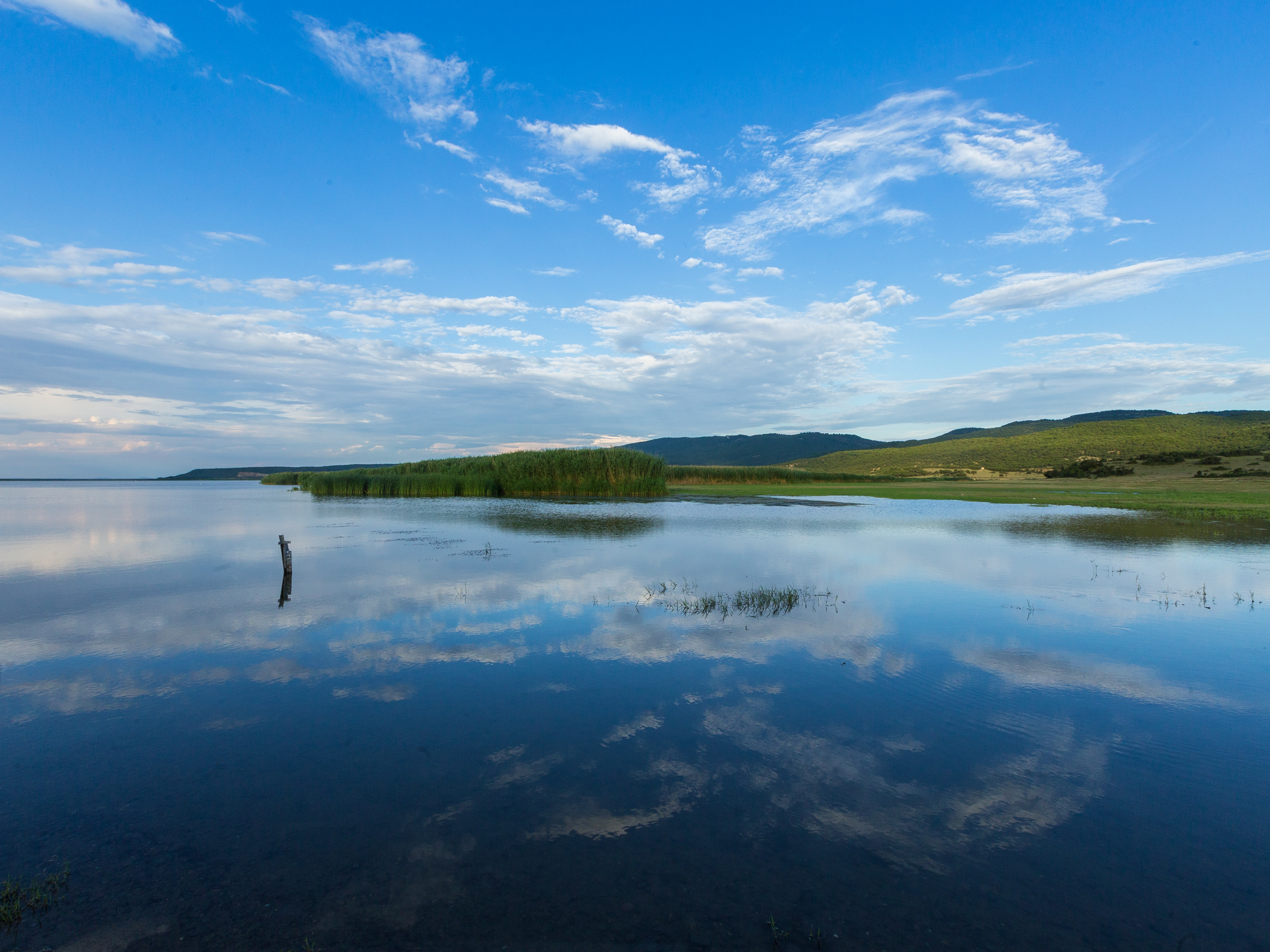

- Location within Turkey
- Location: Edirne Province, Turkey
- Nearest city: İpsala, Enez
- Coordinates: 40°46′07″N 26°11′08″E
- Area: 6,090 ha (15,000 acres)
- Established: March 5, 2005; 21 years ago
- Governing body: Directorate-General of Nature Protection and National Parks; Ministry of Environment and Forest

The Lake Gala National Park (Turkish: Gala Gölü Milli Parkı), established on March 5, 2005, is a national park located within Edirne Province in Marmara region of Turkey.

The national park covers an area consisting of Lake Pamuklu and Lake Küçük Gala within the boundaries of İpsala and Enez districts of Edirne Province. It is 8 km (5.0 mi) far from Enez, and 23 km (14 mi) from İpsala.

In 1991, 2,369 ha (5,850 acres) of land was declared a nature reserve. In 2002, biologists from Trakya University in Edirne demanded transformation of the protected area into national park status due to pollution of lakes by pesticide waste and fertilizer, used in agriculture, as well as uncontrolled fishing activities and bird poaching that reach a level of massacre. In 2005, the area was enlarged to 6,090 ha (15,000 acres), and it was established as a national park. Lake Gala National Park is an ecosystem of 3,090 ha (7,600 acres) wetland, lake and 3,000 ha (7,400 acres) forest. It is a habitat for various plant and animal species.

The protected area is administered by the Directorate-General of Nature Protection and National Parks (Turkish: Doğa Koruma ve Milli Parklar Genel Müdürlüğü) of the Ministry of Environment and Forest.

The national park is situated within the Maritsa Delta Wetland, which is a Ramsar site of A-class meeting three criteria.

== Fauna ==
Birds

The park is quite rich of bird genera. The area hosts around 45,000 birds. Some 163 bird species are observed in the area, of which 46 are resident, 27 winter migratory and 90 summer migratory birds. Best time to observe most of the bird species all together is between April and May in the spring, and September and October in the fall.

In February 2018, it was reported that nearly ten thousand flamingos arrived at the lake for the first time to overwinter because of the mild winter weather, in addition to ducks, geese and trumpeter swans.

Fish

The two lakes are home to 16 fish genera, including European eel (Anguilla anguilla), zander (Stizostedion lucioperca), common carp (Cyprinus carpi) and northern pike (Esox lucius), which are of high economic value.
