= Soğuksu National Park =

National park in Kızılcahamam, Ankara, Turkey

- Soğuksu Milli Parkı
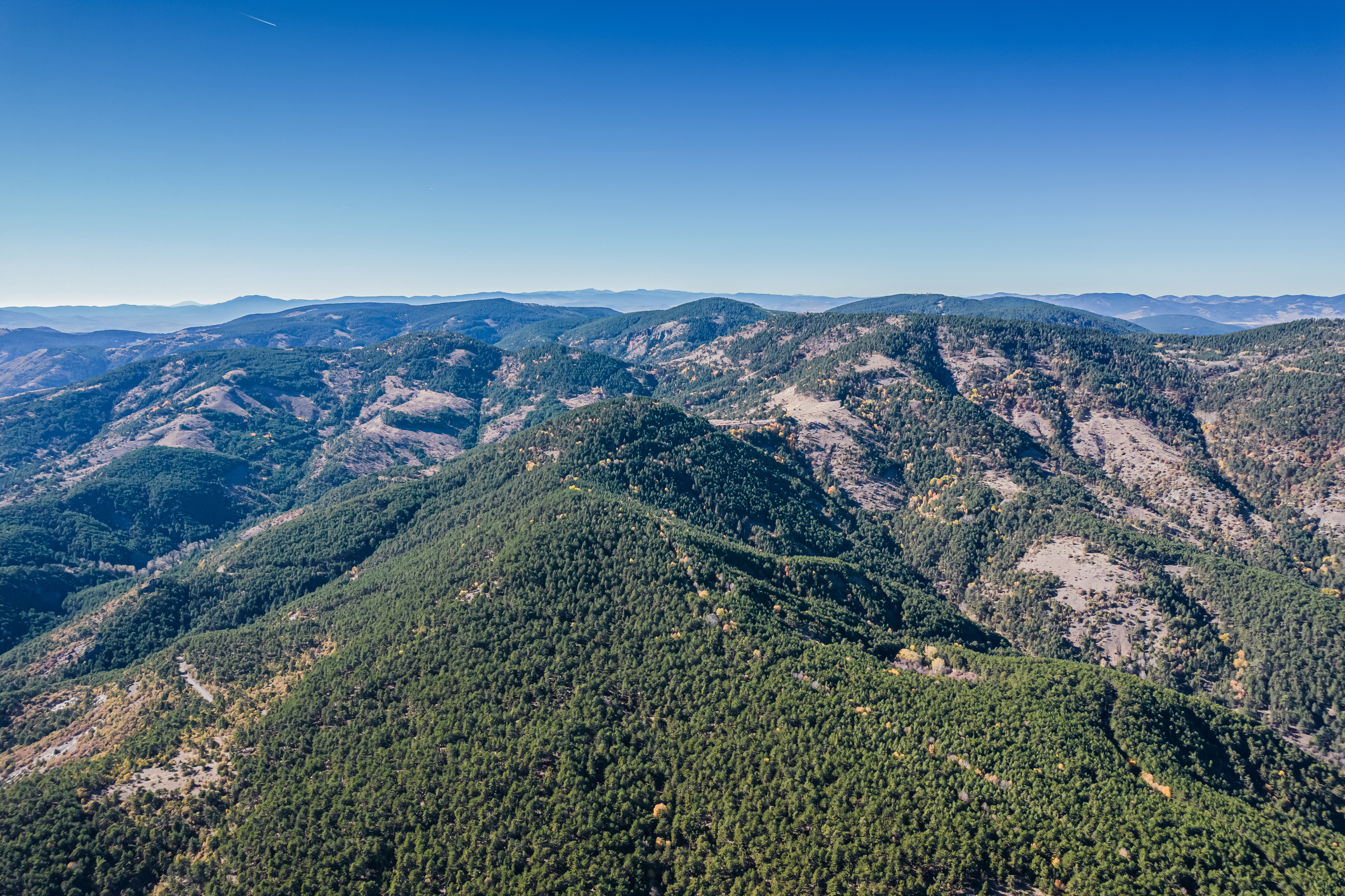
- Aerial view of Soğuksu National Park

- Location within Turkey
- Location: Kızılcahamam, Ankara Province, Turkey
- Coordinates: 40°27′14.87″N 32°37′20.34″E
- Area: 1,187 ha (2,930 acres)
- Established: February 19, 1959
- Governing body: Ministry of Forest and Water Management
- Website: www.milliparklar.gov.tr/mp/soguksu/index.htm

Soğuksu National Park (Turkish: Soğuksu Millî Parkı), established on February 19, 1959, is a national park in central Anatolia, Turkey. It is located in the Kızılcahamam district of Ankara Province.

== Geography ==
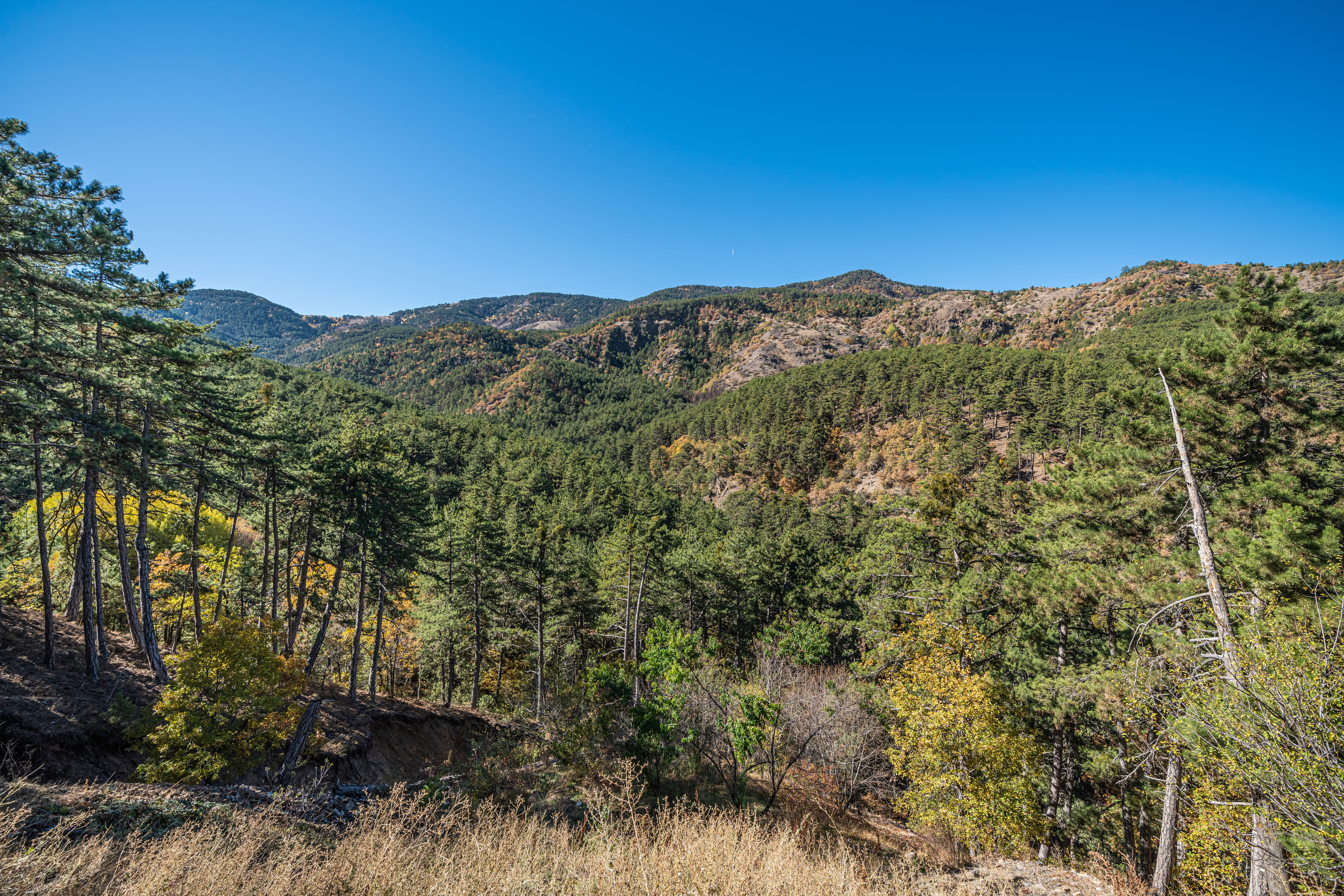
View from a viewpoint in the park

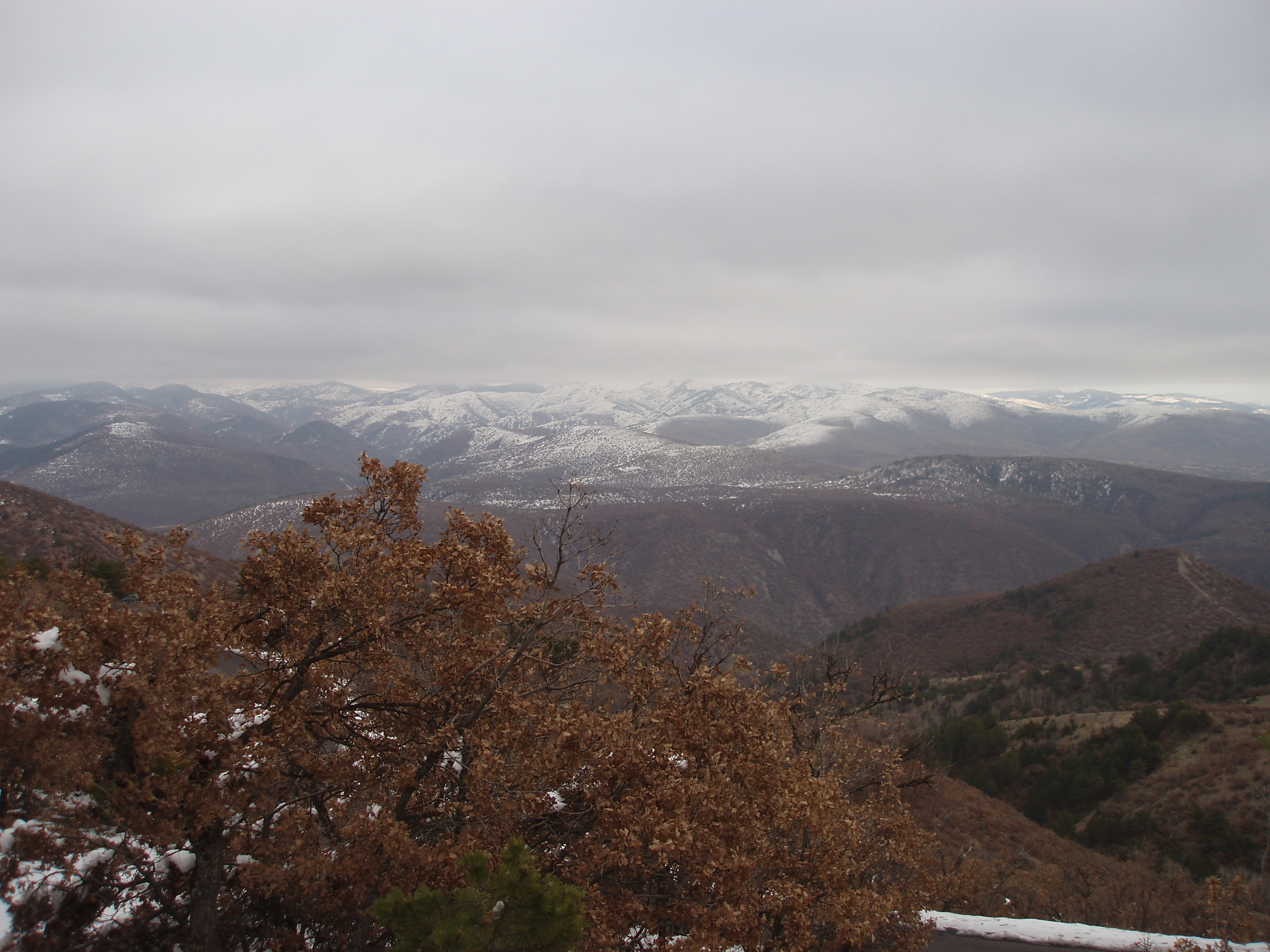
Soğuksu National Park during winter

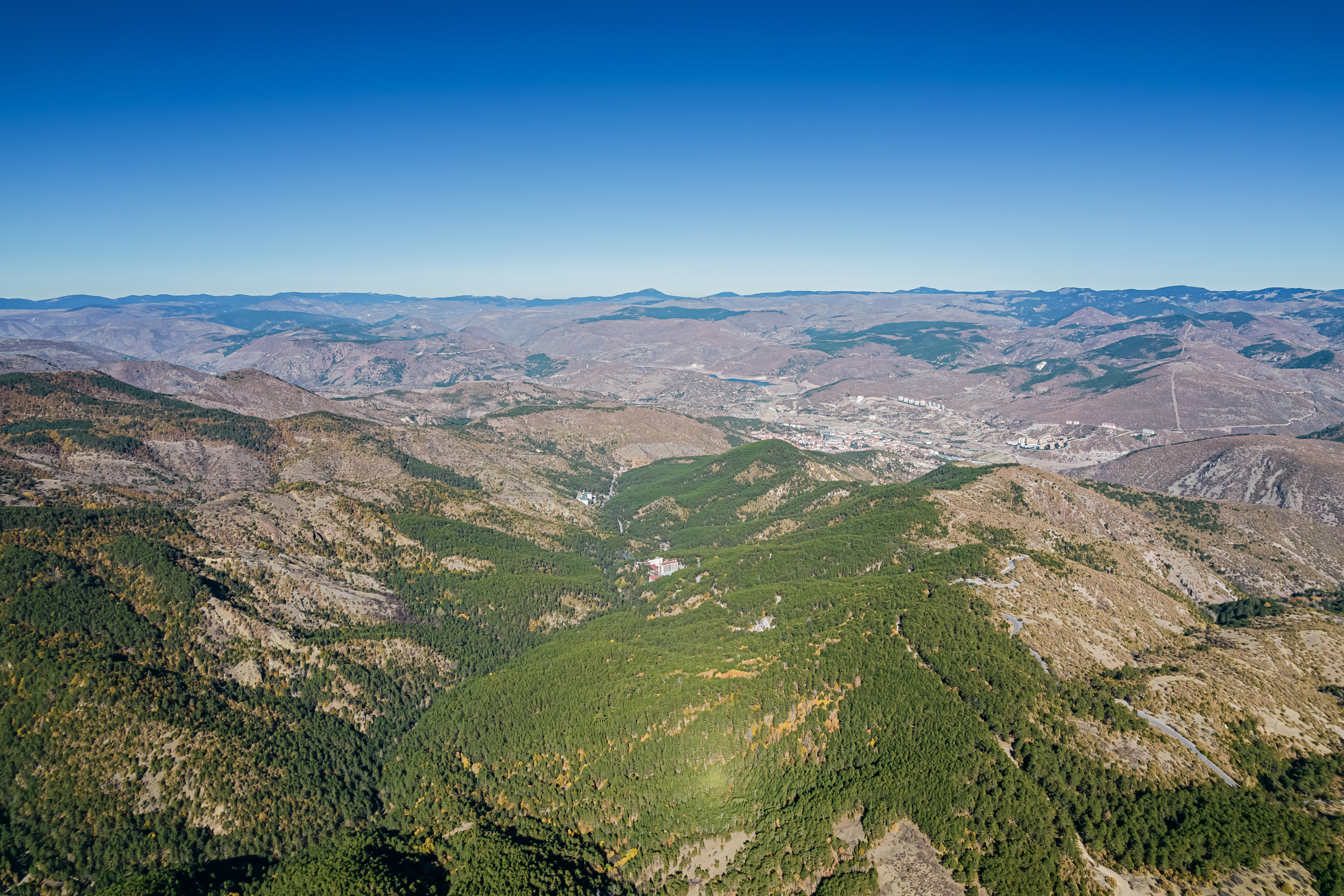
Aerial view towards Kızılcahamam

Soğuksu National Park is located about 80 km (50 mi) north of Ankara in a transition zone between the western Black Sea Region and the Central Anatolia Region that is dominated by dense forests. It covers 1,187 ha (2,930 acres) in total land area, which was extended in 1979 from its initial area of 1,050 ha (2,600 acres).

The national park area consists of plains between small valleys, which converge in two main valleys fed by a number of streams. The streams Batılganın Creek and Küçük Soğuksu Creek run dry in the summer time.

The terrain has a rugged topography. The elevation ranges between 1,030–1,800 m (3,380–5,910 ft) above mean sea level with a mean of 1,100 m (3,600 ft). The highest peaks are Tolubelen Hill 1,776 m (5,827 ft) and Arhut Hill 1,789 m (5,869 ft). Other notable hills are Harmandoruk Hill 1,648 m (5,407 ft), Çakmaklı’nın Doruktepe 1,530 m (5,020 ft), Samrıdoruk Hill 1,447 m (4,747 ft), Kayabelen Hill 1,400 m (4,600 ft), Kel Hill 1,393 m (4,570 ft) and Kara Hill 1,300 m (4,300 ft).

Besides Kızılcahanan, other populated places around the national park are small villages such as Karacaören, Sazak, Saraycık and Alveren.

== Geology ==
The wooded areas of the national park consists of volcanic rocks including andesite, basalt, tuff and agglomerate. Hot springs and cold water sources are found in these areas. The hot springs are evaluated as spa.

In the northern part of the national park, petrified woods are found, which were formed by volcanic activation about 10–12 million years ago. A preserved petrified tree trunk of 250 cm (8.2 ft) length has 170 cm (5.6 ft) diameter.

== Ecosystem ==
=== Flora ===
The forests in the national park, which exhibit the characteristics of European-Siberian vegetation, cover an area of 933 ha (2,310 acres). Dominant species include coniferous trees such as Scots pine (65%), larch (24%) and fir (6%). Other notable trees include broadleaves such as oak (5%), alder, aspen (Populus tremuloides), maple, dogwood (Cornus) and black locust (Robinia pseudoacacia). Wild strawberry (Fragaria), wild rose (Rosa canina), wild pear (Pyrus communis), dwarf juniper (Juniperus pseudosabina), wild hazelnut and hawthorn (Crataegus) are common forms of low vegetation (shrubs and herbaceous plants).

=== Fauna ===
There are about 160 bird species in the national park. Near-threatened bird species such as cinereous vulture (Aegypius monachus) and some eagle species build nests in the area. The wooded areas are sparsely inhabited by mammals, including red deer, roe deer, and species of bear, wolf, fox, jackal, weasel, wild boar, rabbit and squirrel.

In a bird hatchery established in the national park, chukar partridge (Alectoris chukar), grey partridge (Perdix perdix), falcon, pheasant, quail and pigeon (Columbidae) are being bred.

== Climate ==
The climate in the Soğuksu National Park and its surroundings shows the transient character between the continental climate of the Central Anatolian steppe and the rainy climate of the North Anatolia. Although the annual average temperature in the nearby town of Kızılcahamam is around 9.6 °C (49.3 °F), it is about 5 °C (41 °F) less in the national park.

== Facilities and recreation ==
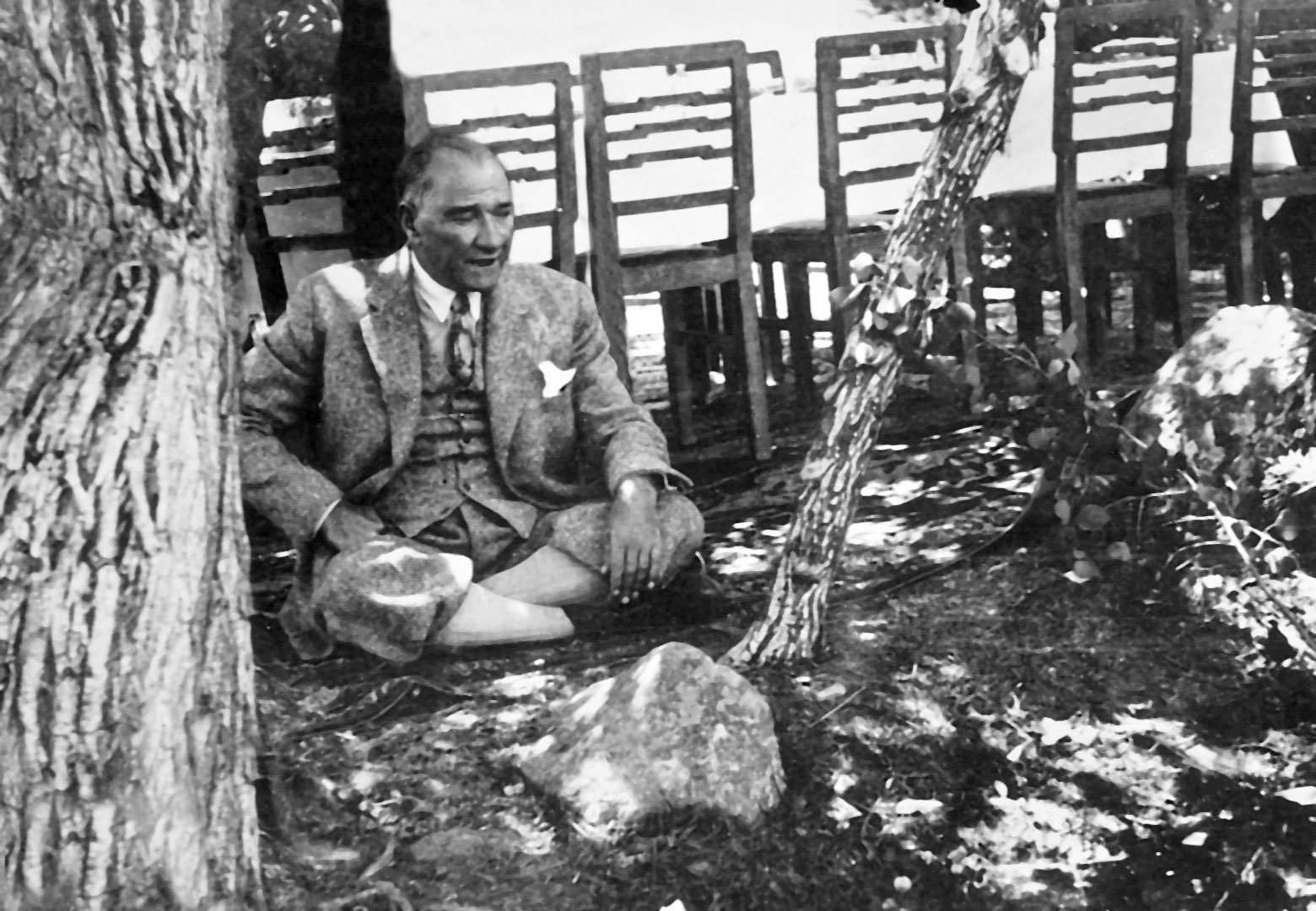
Mustafa Kemal Atatürk resting under a pine tree in July 1934. The place in the national park is named today "Atatürk's Pine Tree".

Due to its relative proximity to the capital, the national park is a popular destination for the residents of Ankara. Only one third of the park area is reserved for public use while the rest is protected natural area. It features a 16 km (9.9 mi)-long trail.

An information center, two restaurants, a kiosk are at service in the national park. A 300-bed thermal spa resort in the park is also available for visitors. Further facilities are available such as campsites, picnic tables, fire places, faucets and public toilets, which can meet the needs of about 12,000 visitors.

The national park offers opportunities for diverse recreational outdoor activities such as hiking, trekking, camping, birdwatching, mountaineering and photo safari. Mountain climbing is performed on the northwestern part of Osmandede Hill. A 2009-built station at the hillside of Kayabeleni Hill offers birdwatching for black vulture, and a bird feeder for black vulture is situated at Yanık Sırtı.

"Atatürk Çamı" ("Atatürk's Pine Tree") is a place in the national park with historic value, where Mustafa Kemal Atatürk (1881–1938) once took a rest. A "Atatürk Day" is held annually on July 18 at this site.

== Access ==
Soğuksu National Park is accessible 2 km (1.2 mi) west of Kızılcahamam, which is on the state road 750 78 km (48 mi) north of Ankara.

Ankara city bus line EGO 527 serves the national park from Ulus, Ankara four times a day. The ride takes around two and half hours.

== In popular media ==
The Ministry of Forest and Water Management produced a 5-minute documentary film titled "Soğuksu: Bozkırdaki Orman" ("Soğuksu: A Forest in Steppe") about the black vulture and the wildcat living in the national park. The movie found considerable attraction of interest in the social media.
