= Çamlık, Derebucak =

Çamlık
- Neighbourhood
- Location within Turkey Location within Turkey Central Anatolia
- Coordinates: 37.35056°N 31.63683°E
- Country: Turkey
- Province: Konya
- District: Derebucak
- Population (2023): 898
- Time zone: UTC+3 (TRT)
- Postal code: 42480
- Area code: 0332

Çamlık is a neighborhood, formerly a village, in the Derebucak district of Konya Province, Turkey. As of 2023, the population of the settlement is 898.

== Population history ==
Historical population
Year	Pop.	±% p.a.
2013	1,295	—
2018	1,074	−3.67%
2023	898	−3.52%
Source: TÜİK (2013-2023)

== Place of interest ==
The 2022-established Derebucak Çamlık Caves National Park (Turkish: Derebucak Çamlık Mağaraları Milli Parkı), which contains 13 different show caves and sinkholes, is located next to the village.
