= Yozgat Pine Grove National Park =

National park in Yozgat, Turkey

- Yozgat Çamlığı Millî Parkı
- IUCN category II (national park)
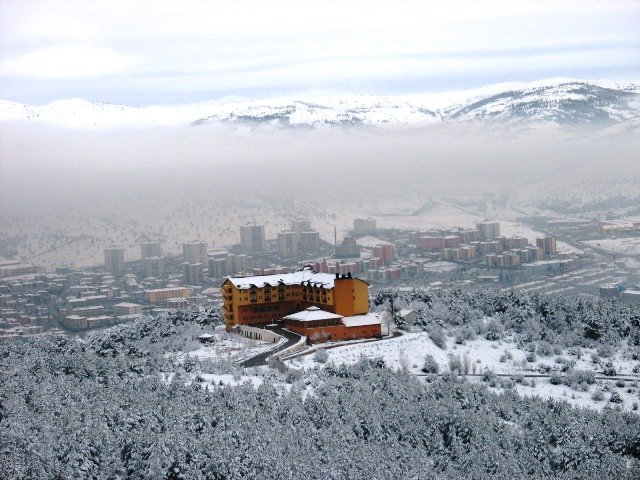

- Location within Turkey
- Location: Yozgat Province, Turkey
- Nearest city: Yozgat
- Coordinates: 39.80590°N 34.81524°E
- Area: 264 ha (1.02 sq mi)
- Established: February 5, 1958; 68 years ago
- Governing body: Directorate-General of Forestry; Ministry of Forestry and Water Affairs

The Yozgat Pine Grove National Park (Turkish: Yozgat Çamlığı Millî Parkı) is a national park consisting of pine trees in Yozgat, Central Anatolia Region of Turkey. It was established on February 5, 1958 as the country's first national park.

The park, a forest island on hills within wide steppes in the region, covers an area of 264 ha (1.02 sq mi) and its average elevation is 1,360 m (4,460 ft) above sea level. Yozgat Pine Grove National Park is administered by the Directorate-General of Forestry, a governmental agency of the Ministry of Forestry and Water Affairs. The species of pine trees within the national park are found only in the higher elevations of Caucasus Mountains. According to Ali Şimşek, the director of the park, the trees, between 350 and 500 years old, are under protection. Some of the trees are tagged with their age on them.

The national park is located 5 km (3.1 mi) south of the city Yozgat. It is a popular recreational area for the residents of the city. The park has various facilities for visitors like a three-star hotel, campsite, restaurant, cafeteria and playground.
