= Lake Kovada National Park =

National park in Isparta, Turkey

- Kovada Gölü Milli Parkı
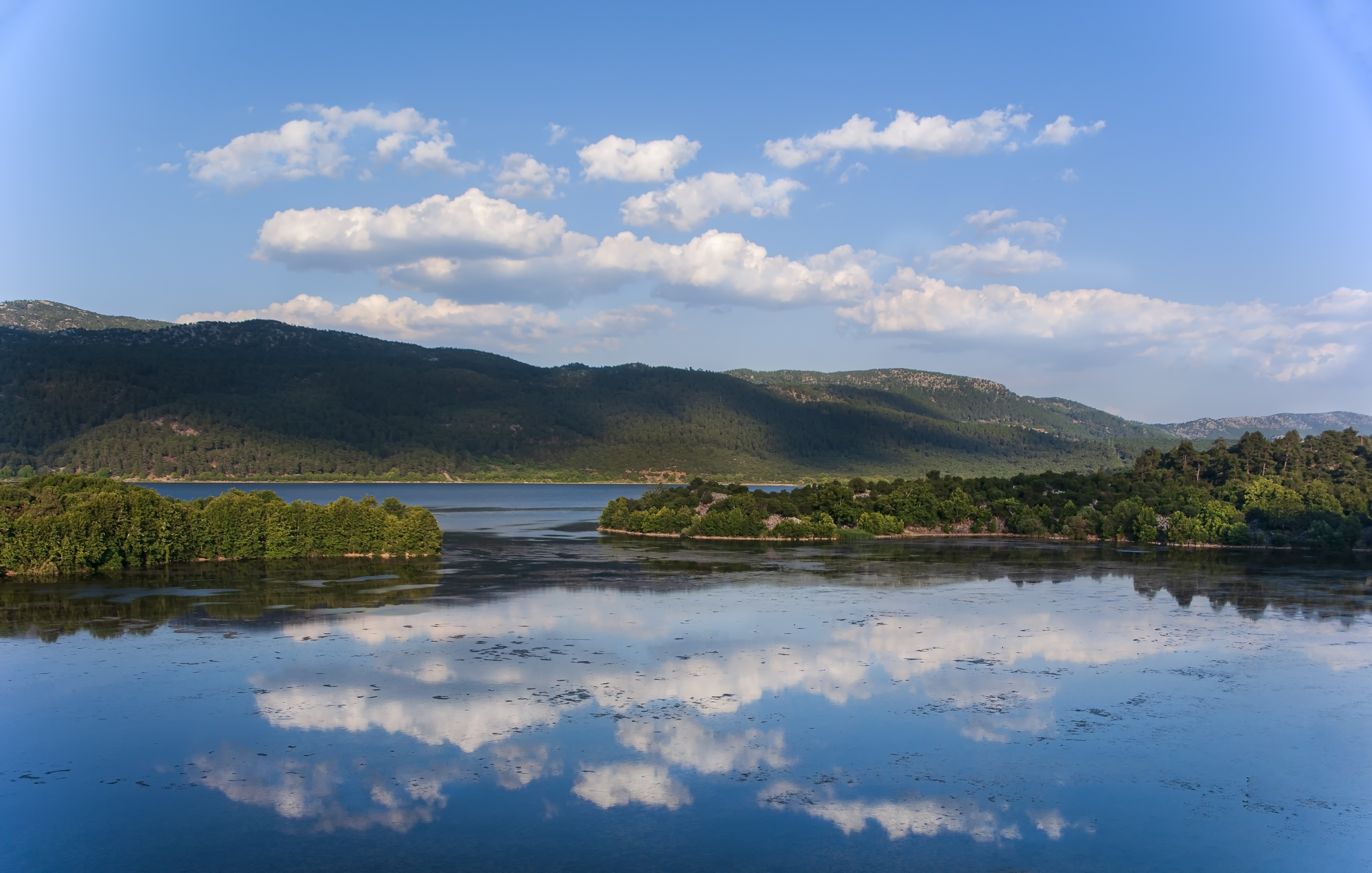

- Location within Turkey
- Location: Sütçüler-Eğirdir, Isparta Province, Turkey
- Coordinates: 37°37′09.79″N 30°52′14.74″E
- Area: 6,551 ha (16,190 acres)
- Established: November 3, 1970
- Governing body: Ministry of Forest and Water Management
- Website: www.milliparklar.gov.tr/mp/kovadagolu/index.htm

Lake Kovada National Park (Turkish: Kovada Gölü Milli Parkı), established on November 3, 1970, is a national park in southern Turkey. It is located in the Sütçüler-Eğirdir districts of Isparta Province.

== Gallery ==
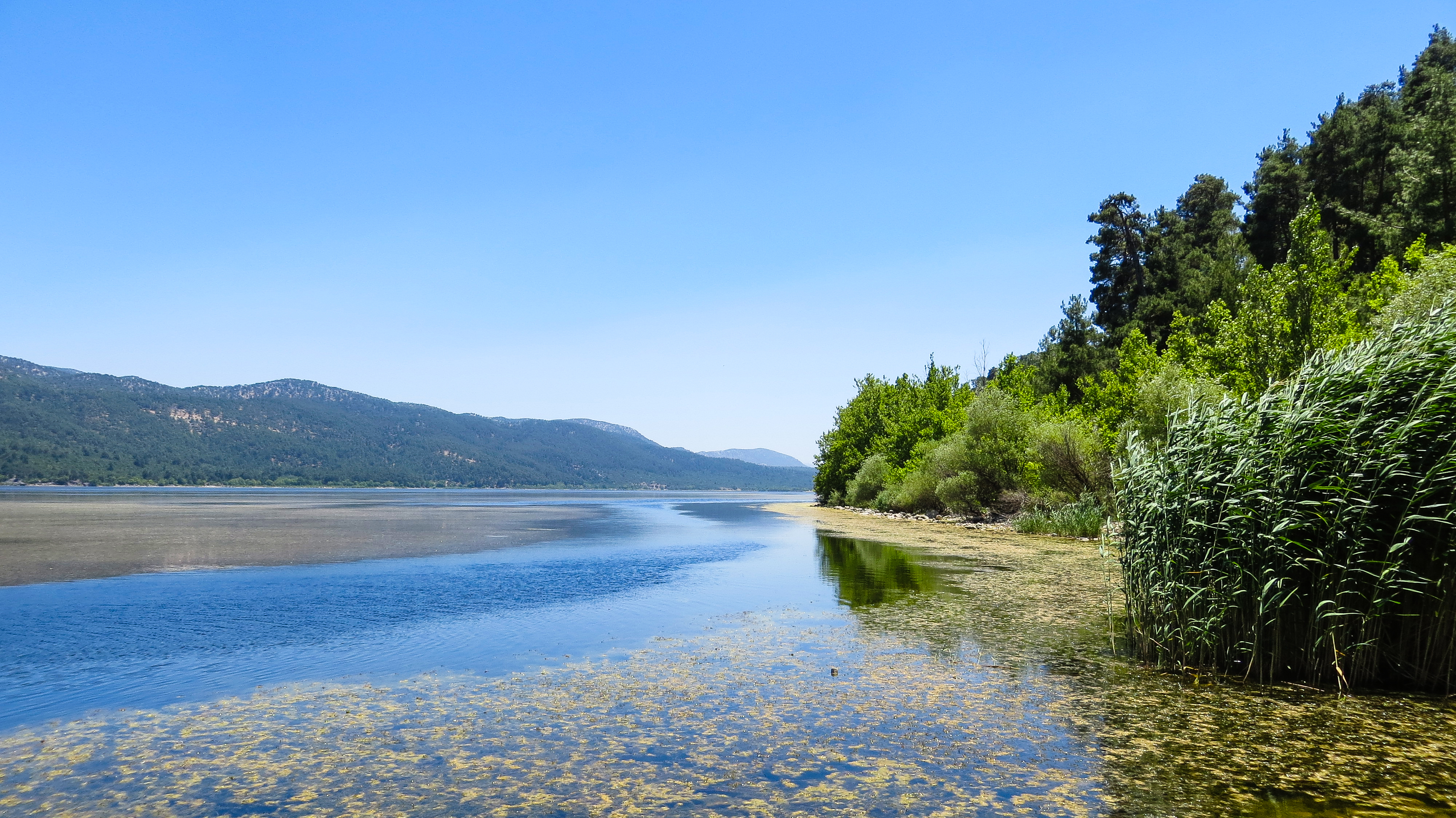

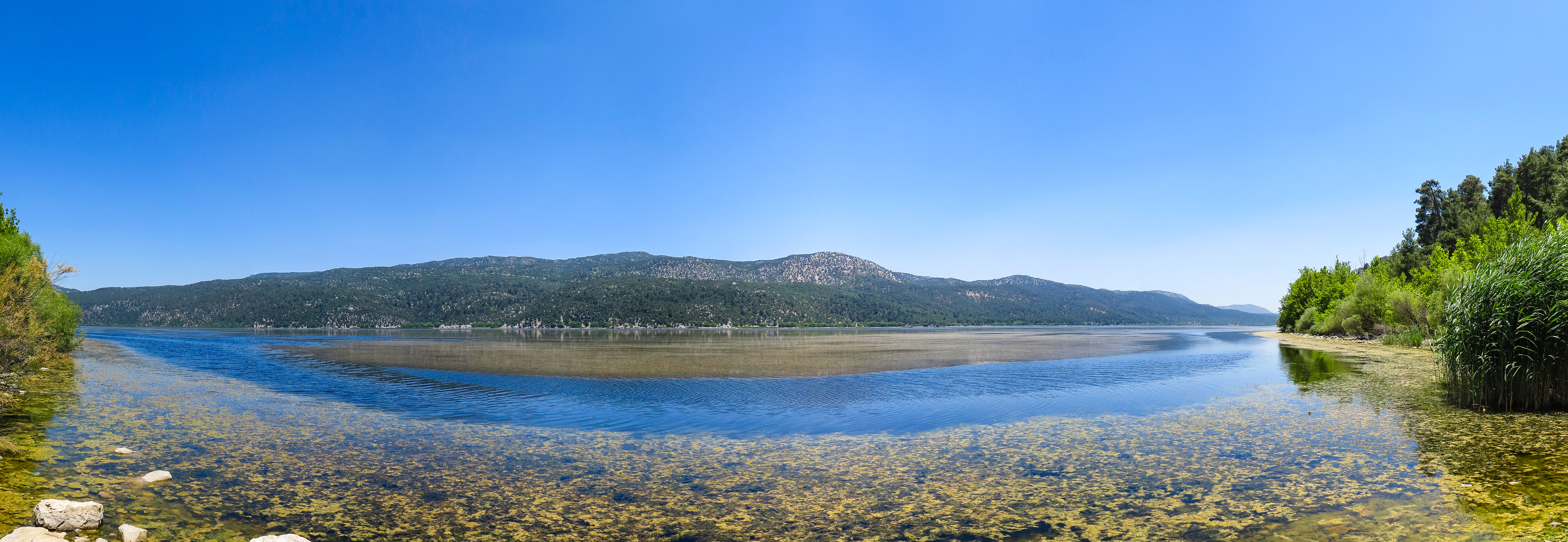

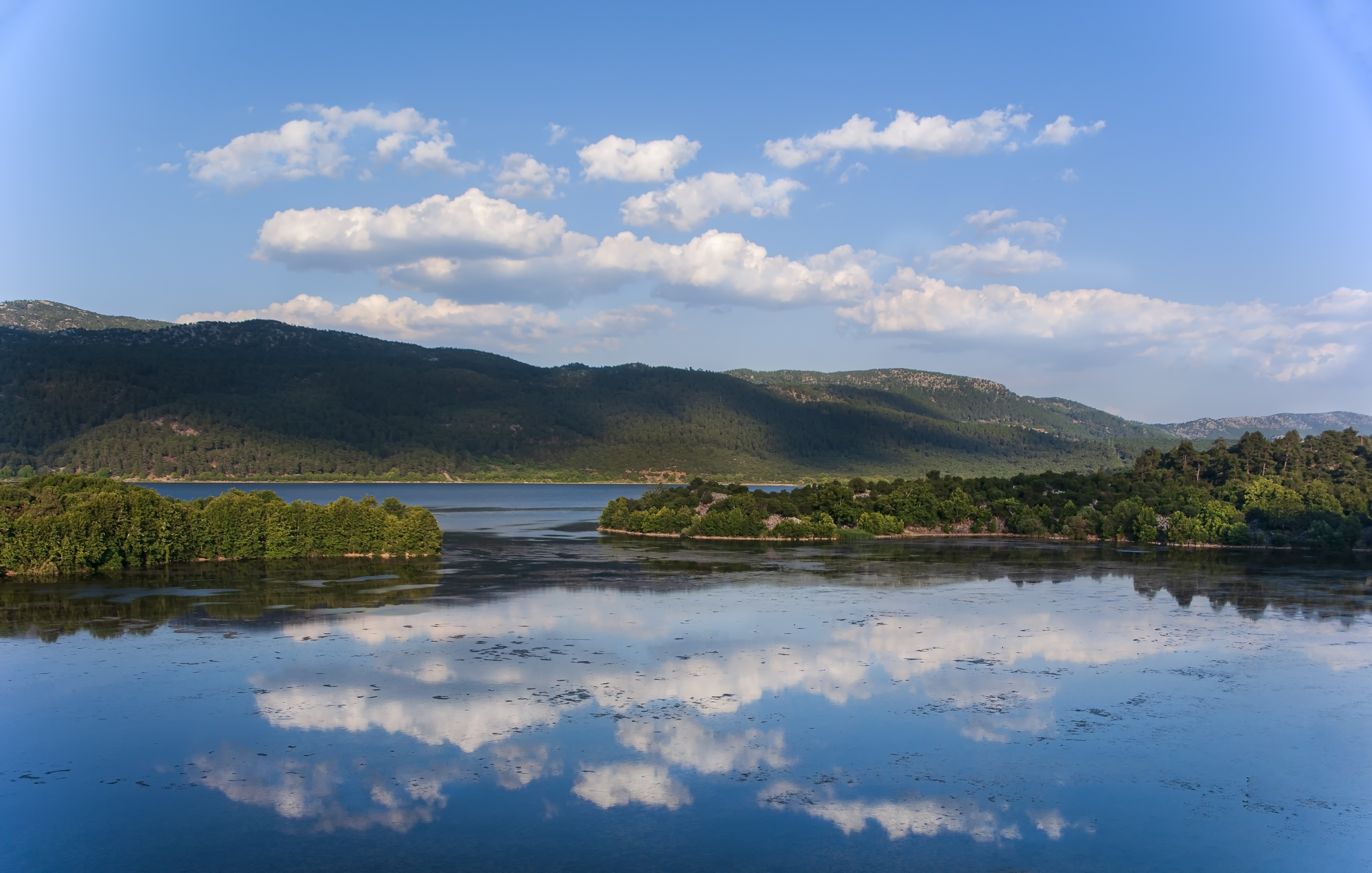

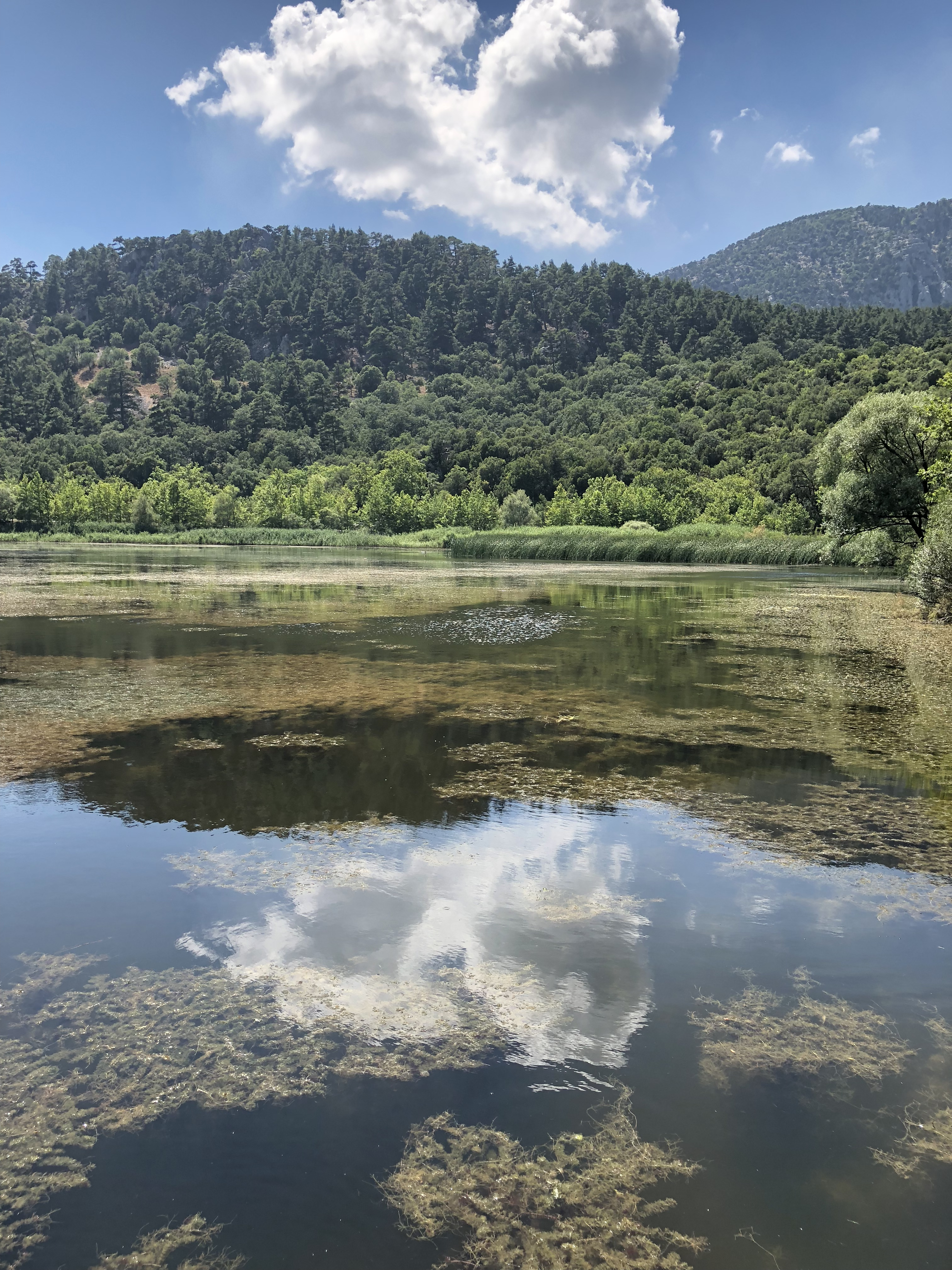
