= Tek Tek Mountains National Park =

National park in Şanlıurfa, Turkey

- Tek Tek Dağlari Milli Parkı
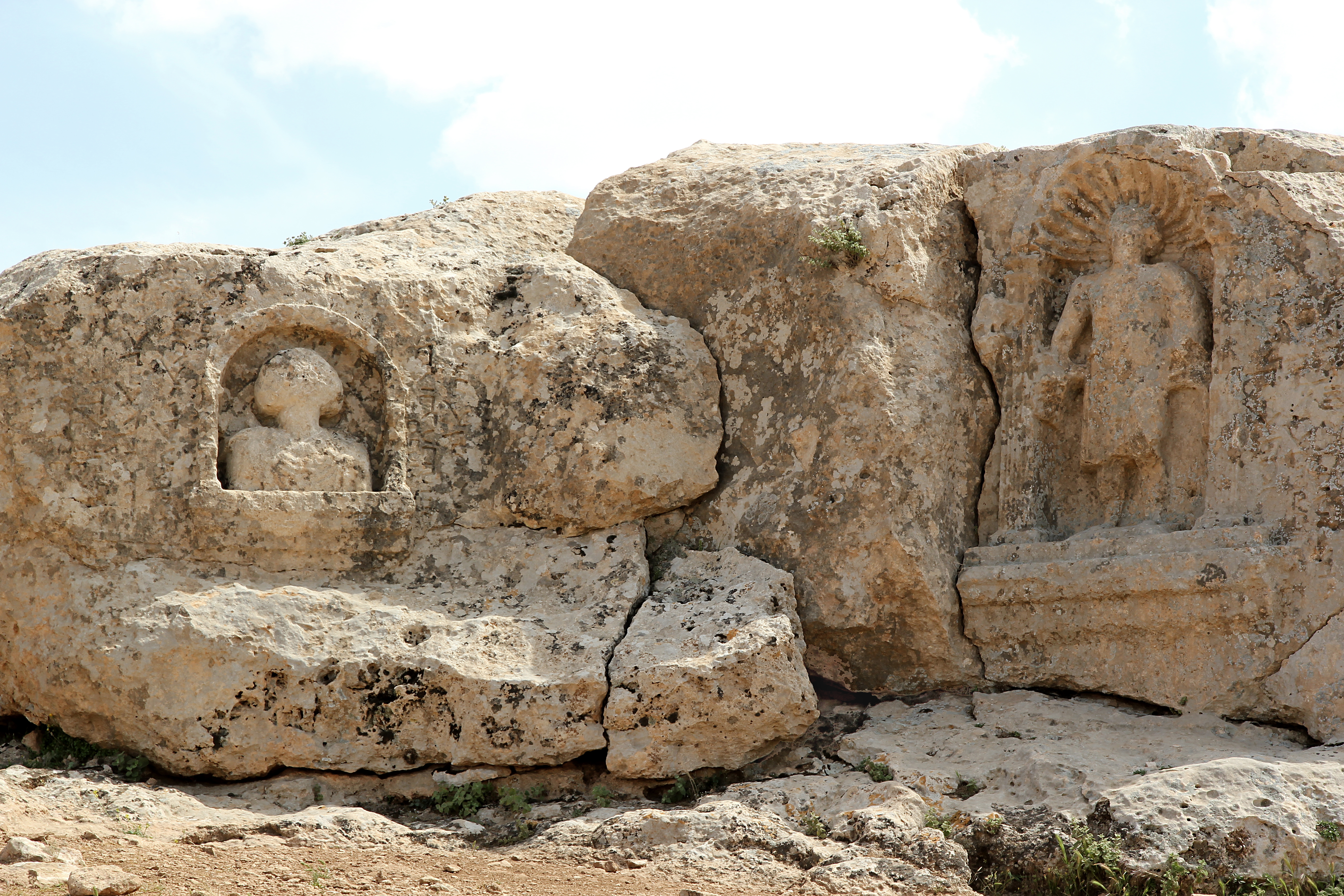
- Sumatar Relief

- Location within Turkey
- Location: Şanlıurfa, Turkey
- Coordinates: 36°50′02.58″N 39°16′44.56″E
- Area: 19,335 ha (47,780 acres)
- Established: May 29, 2007
- Governing body: Ministry of Forest and Water Management
- Website: www.milliparklar.gov.tr/mp/tektekdaglari/index.htm

Tek Tek Mountains National Park (Turkish: Tek Tek Dağları Milli Parkı), established on May 29, 2007, is a national park in southeastern Turkey. It is located in Şanlıurfa.

The national park covers an area of 19,335 ha (47,780 acres).
