= Sarıkamış-Allahuekber Mountains National Park =

National park in Turkey

- Sarıkamış-Allahuekber Dağları Milli Parkı
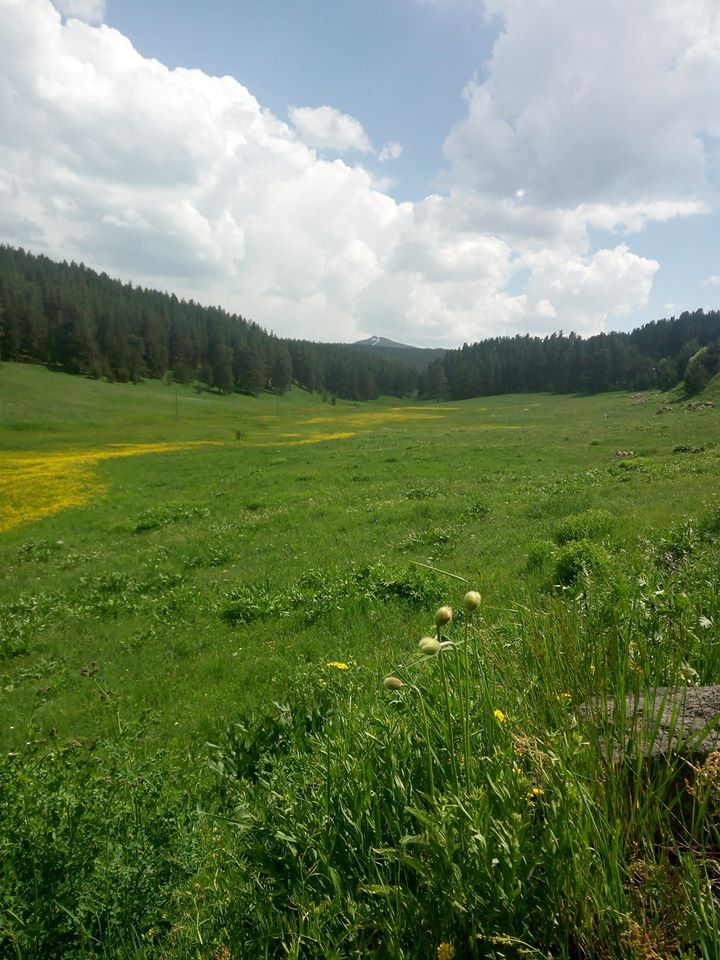

- Location within Turkey Location within Caucasus Mountains Location within Europe
- Location: Şenkaya, Erzurum Province-Sarıkamış, Kars Province, Turkey
- Coordinates: 40°18′07.27″N 42°36′52.04″E
- Area: 22,519 ha (55,650 acres)
- Established: October 19, 2004
- Governing body: Ministry of Forest and Water Management
- Website: www.milliparklar.gov.tr/mp/sarikamisallahuekberdaglari/index.htm

Sarıkamış-Allahuekber Mountains National Park (Turkish: Sarıkamış-Allahuekber Dağları Milli Parkı), established on October 19, 2004, is a national park in northeastern Turkey. The national park stretches over the mountain range of Allahuekber Mountains and is located on the province border of Erzurum and Kars.

It covers an area of 22,519 ha (55,650 acres) at an average elevation of 2,300 m (7,500 ft).

The national park is of historical importance, where during the Battle of Sarikamish at the beginning of World War I about 60,000 Turkish soldiers died freezing under harsh winter conditions on the Allahuekber Mountains.
