= Hakkari Cilo-Sat Mountains National Park =

National park in Turkey

- Hakkâri Cilo ve Sat Dağları Milli Parkı
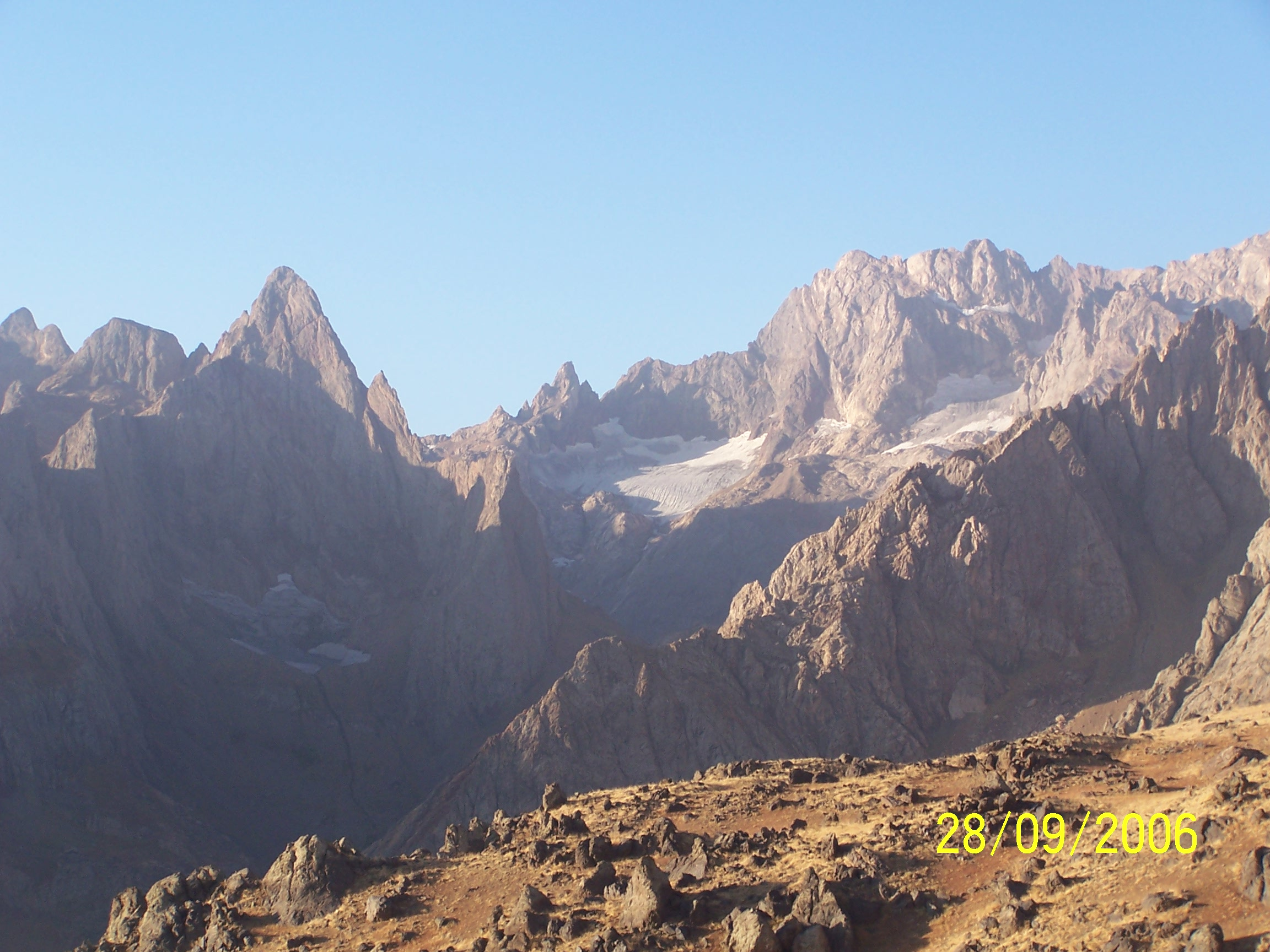
- Cilo Mountain

- Location within Turkey
- Location: Hakkari Province, Turkey
- Coordinates: 37.48573°N 44.00415°E
- Area: 27,500 ha (68,000 acres)
- Elevation: 4,135 m (13,566 ft)
- Established: 26 September 2020; 5 years ago
- Governing body: Directorate-General of Nature Protection and National Parks; Mimistry of Agriculture and Forestry

Hakkari Cilo-Sat Mountains National Park (Turkish: Hakkâri Cilo ve Sat Dağları Milli Parkı, established on 26 September 2020, is the 45th national park in Turkey. It is located in Yüksekova district within Hakkari Province, Southeastern Anatolia.

== Overview ==
The Mount Cilo and Mount Sat, also known as Buzul and İkiyaka Mountains respectively, are a mountain range located in Yüksekova district, east of Hakkari city, southeastern Turkey. The mountain range is 50 km (31 mi) far from Yüksekova town.

== National park ==
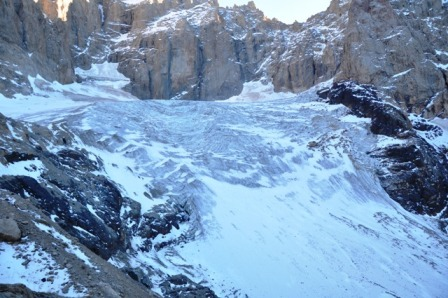
Uludoruk Glacier

Stretching over an area of 27,500 ha (68,000 acres), the mountain range and its surroundings were declared as the 45th national park in Turkey on 26 September 2020. The national park is administrated by the Directoriate-General of Nature Protection and National Parks at the Ministry of Agriculture and Forestry.

The national park area is around 60 km (37 mi) long as the crow flies in the northwest-southeast direction. It features high mountain belts, plateaus, deep valleys, streams, waterfalls, glaciers, many large and small glacial lakes as well as many churches and rock paintings. The İnci Stream passes throughwitth Uludoruk reaching 4,125 m (13,533 ft). the valley between the Cilo and Sat Mountains.

Mount Cilo is the second highest mountain in Turkey with its peak Uludoruk reaching 4,135 m (13,566 ft). Other important peaks of the mountain range are Suppa Durek with 4,060 m (13,320 ft), Köşedireği Mountain with 3,700 m (12,100 ft), Kisara Mountain with 3,500 m (11,500 ft), Maunseli Sivrisi with 3,850 m (12,630 ft) and Gelyona Hill with 3,650 m (11,980 ft). In 1931, the mounyaineers Ludwig Sperlich and his friend Ludwig Krenek made the first climb to Uludoruk peak.

The mountain range has a very steep topography due to abrasion, cracking and erosion caused by glacial activities and freezing-thawing effect. Deep glacial valleys, moraines and lakes in the area show the deep effects of glaciation that started two million years ago. These glaciers are still in the process of melting, starting from twenty thousand years ago until today. It is claimed that this melting process may develop under the influence of global and regional climate changes, and bring about significant changes in the ecosystem of the region. In August 2023, it was observed that about 3,000 m (9,800 ft) of the glacier broke apart in the Cennet-Cehennem region of the mountain.

=== Flora ===
The upper parts of the mountains are covered with high alpine meadows, where stony areas are dense. These areas are home to many narrow-ranging and endangered plant species. In the upper reaches, there are permanent glaciers and glacial lakes, especially concentrated in the Sat Mountains. Remnant oak forests and walnut communities lie in the low south-facing valleys.

Cilo Mountains are one of the most important areas in Turkey and the world in terms of plants, and meet the criteria for Key Biodiversity Area. It is habitat for 53 plant taxa, including six endemic plants, among them are the endemic plant species Cephalaria hakkiarica and Cirsium hakkaricum.

=== Fauna ===
The mountainous area is rich in animal species diversity. It is known that the Lake Urmia newt (Neurergus crocatus), which is close to extinction worldwide, the wild goat (Capra aegagrus), the narrow-distributed Persian mol (Talpa davidiana), as well as eleven butterfly taxa, including four endemic species. The polyeyed Hakkari freckle (Polyommatus dezinus) find habitat only here. Bird species known to breed in the area include golden eagle (Aquila chrysaetos), Eurasian griffon vulture (Gyps fulvus) and Caspian snowcock (Tetraogallus caspius).

=== Activities ===
Although Cilo and Sat mountains are with the most landscape beauty, they can be used for nature sports only in a limited way due to security reasons. Throughout much of the 1990s, this was a prohibited area due to the armed insurgency which was active in the region. Injuries or deadly accidents can also occur when glaciers break apart and create crevasse in the area.

Mergan Plateau and Avaspi Glaciers are places of interest. Mountaineering for Uludoruk summit is performed in the summer season by experienced mountaineers under a guide starting from the Serpil Plateau at the foot of Cilo Mountain.

=== Access ===
The 2,400 m (7,900 ft)-high Mergan Plateau, which is in the valley, where the Uludoruk glacier of the Cilo Mountains is located, is 37 km (23 mi) far from Hakkari.

Cilo Mountain can be reached also from the south via Yüksekova- Dağlıca village road, but this road is not used for security reasons. Transportation to Sat Mountain is via Yüksekova, 23 km (14 mi) by motor vehicle and 8 km (5.0 mi) by foot or horse back riding.
