= Saklıkent National Park =

Canyon in Fethiye, Muğla, Turkey

- Saklıkent Milli Parkı
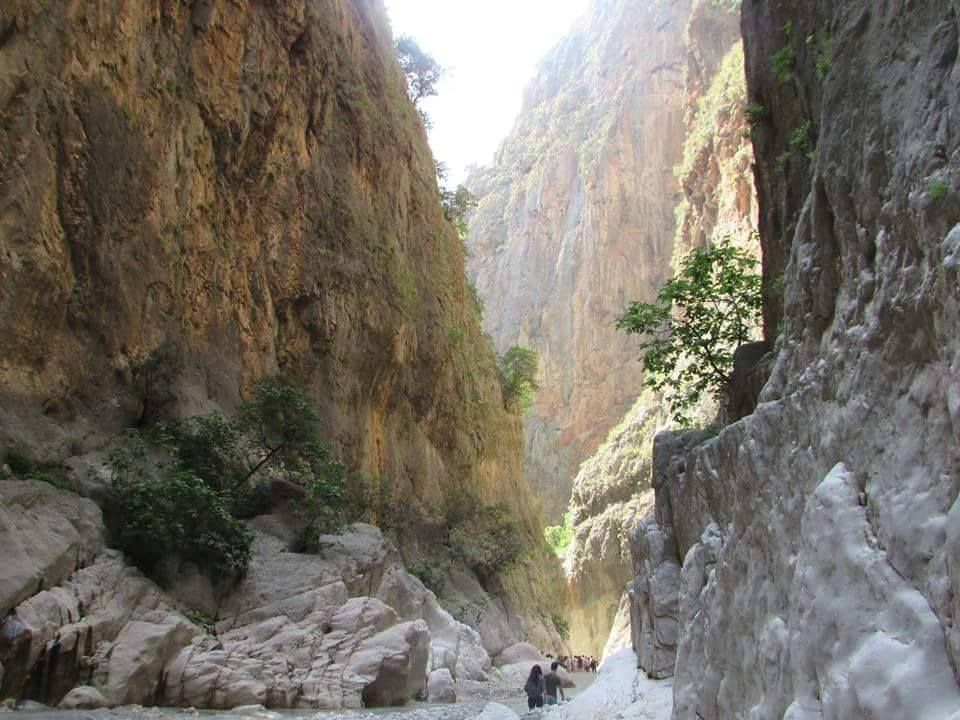
- A view from the canyon.

- Location within Turkey
- Location: Fethiye, Muğla Province, Turkey
- Coordinates: 36°28′07.62″N 29°24′12.31″E
- Area: 1,643 ha (4,060 acres)
- Established: June 6, 1996
- Governing body: Ministry of Forest and Water Management
- Website: www.milliparklar.gov.tr/mp/saklikent/index.htm

Saklıkent National Park (Turkish: Saklıkent Milli Parkı), established on June 6, 1996, is a national park in southwestern Turkey. The national park is a canyon, and is located in Muğla Province, at Seydikemer, 50 km (31 mi) away from Fethiye. The Canyon is 65 km from Kaş in the Antalya province.

The canyon is 300 m (980 ft) deep and 18 km (11 mi) long, making it one of the deepest in the world. It was formed through abrasion of the rocks by flowing waters over thousands of years. As the water level rises during the winter months, while visitors can enter the canyon all year around, the deeper parts are accessible only in the summer. 4 km (2.5 mi) of the canyon are walkable after April, when most of the snow in the Taurus Mountains has melted and passed through on its way to the Mediterranean Sea. Saklıkent means "hidden city" in Turkish. The full length of 16 km is only possible to discover with professional equipment and knowledge of advanced canyoning. Some adventure centers offer guided tours with an overnight Biwak camp and about 30 waterfalls to rappel.

People from local resorts such as Ölüdeniz and Fethiye often take a Jeep Safari tour offered by local travel agents, which includes Waterfights en route and stops at other local businesses and establishments. Local people often take the Dolmuş as it's a cheaper alternative and provides you with more freedom.

In 2024, a new wooden bridge was built across the waterway.

== Gallery ==
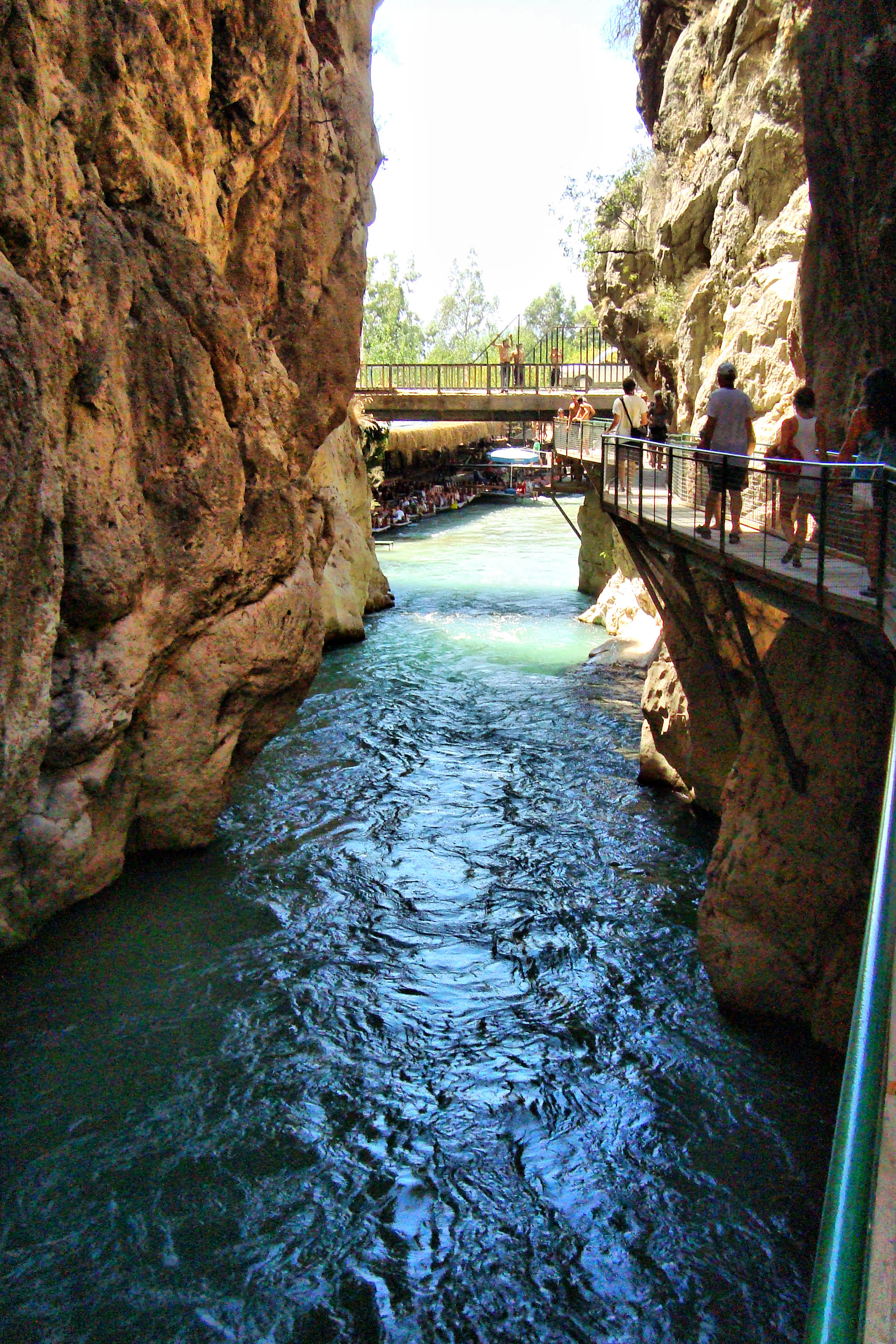

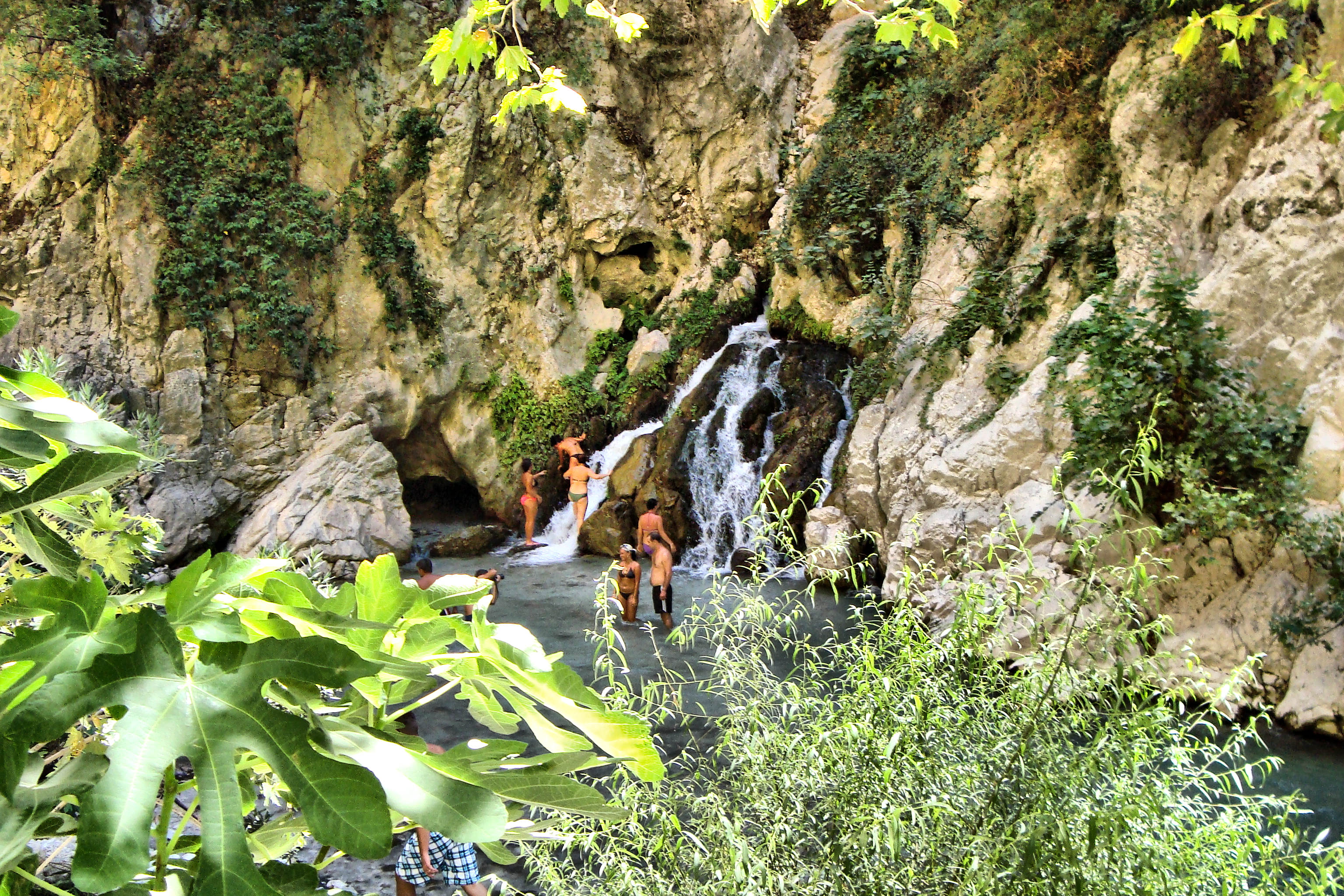

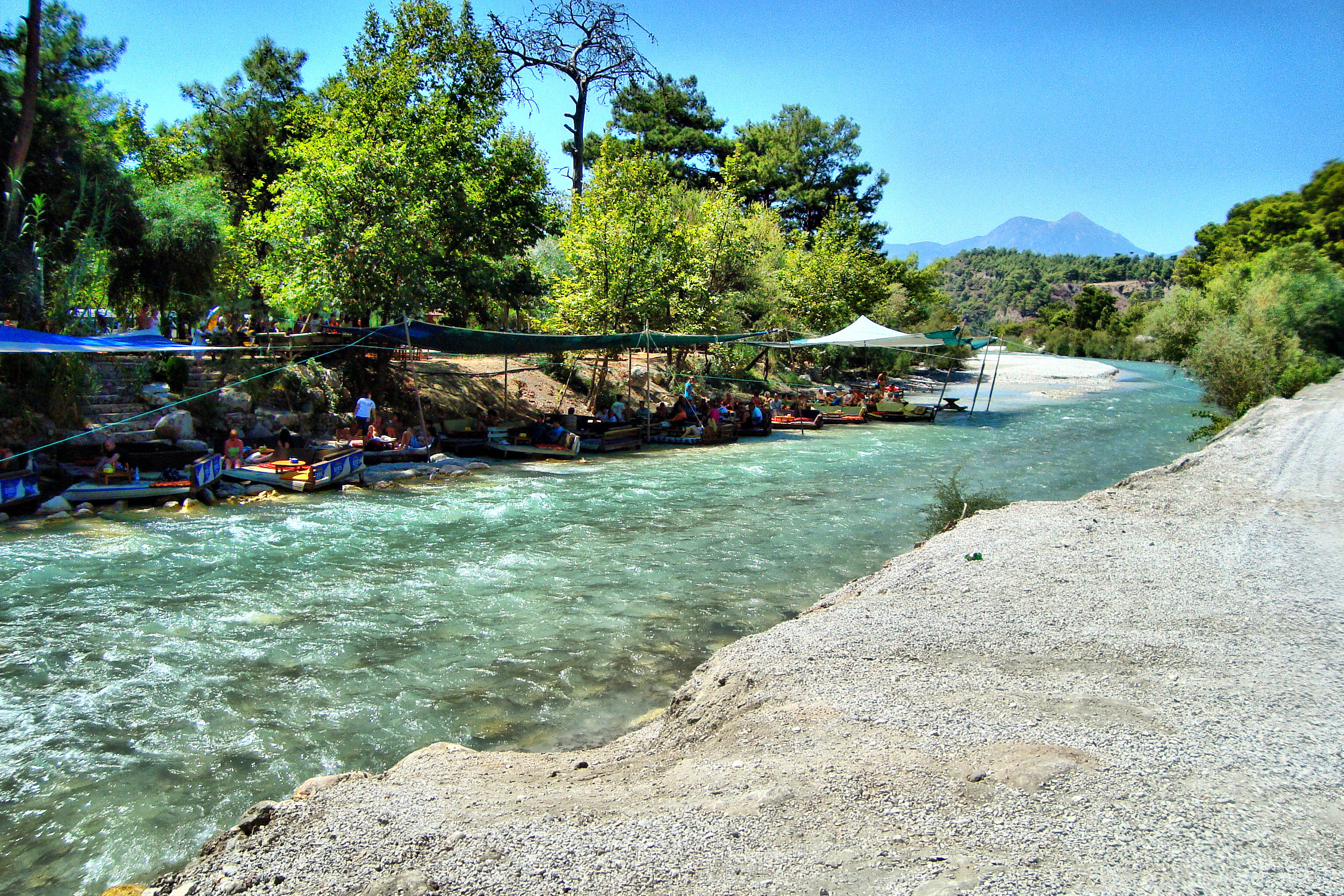

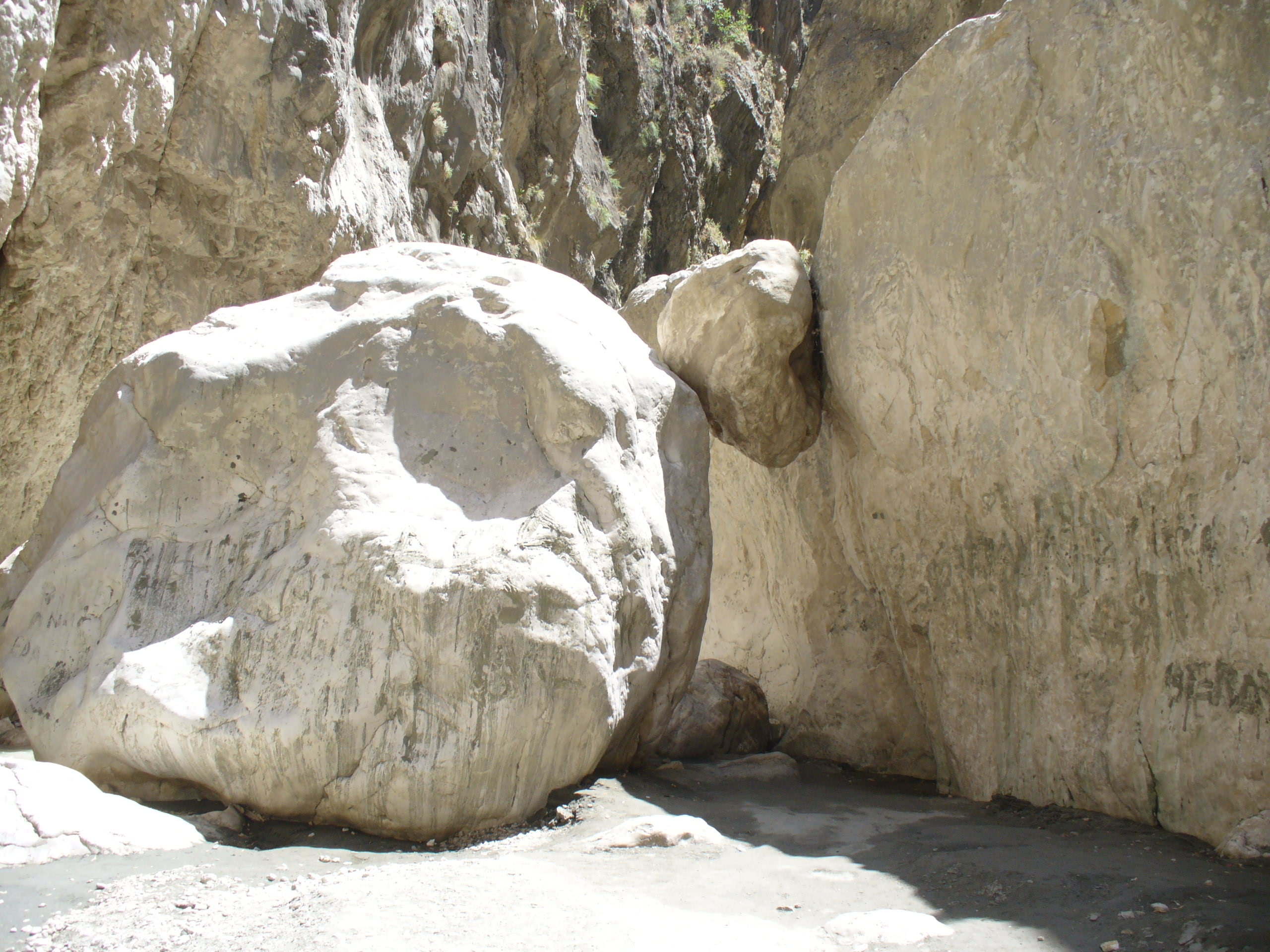

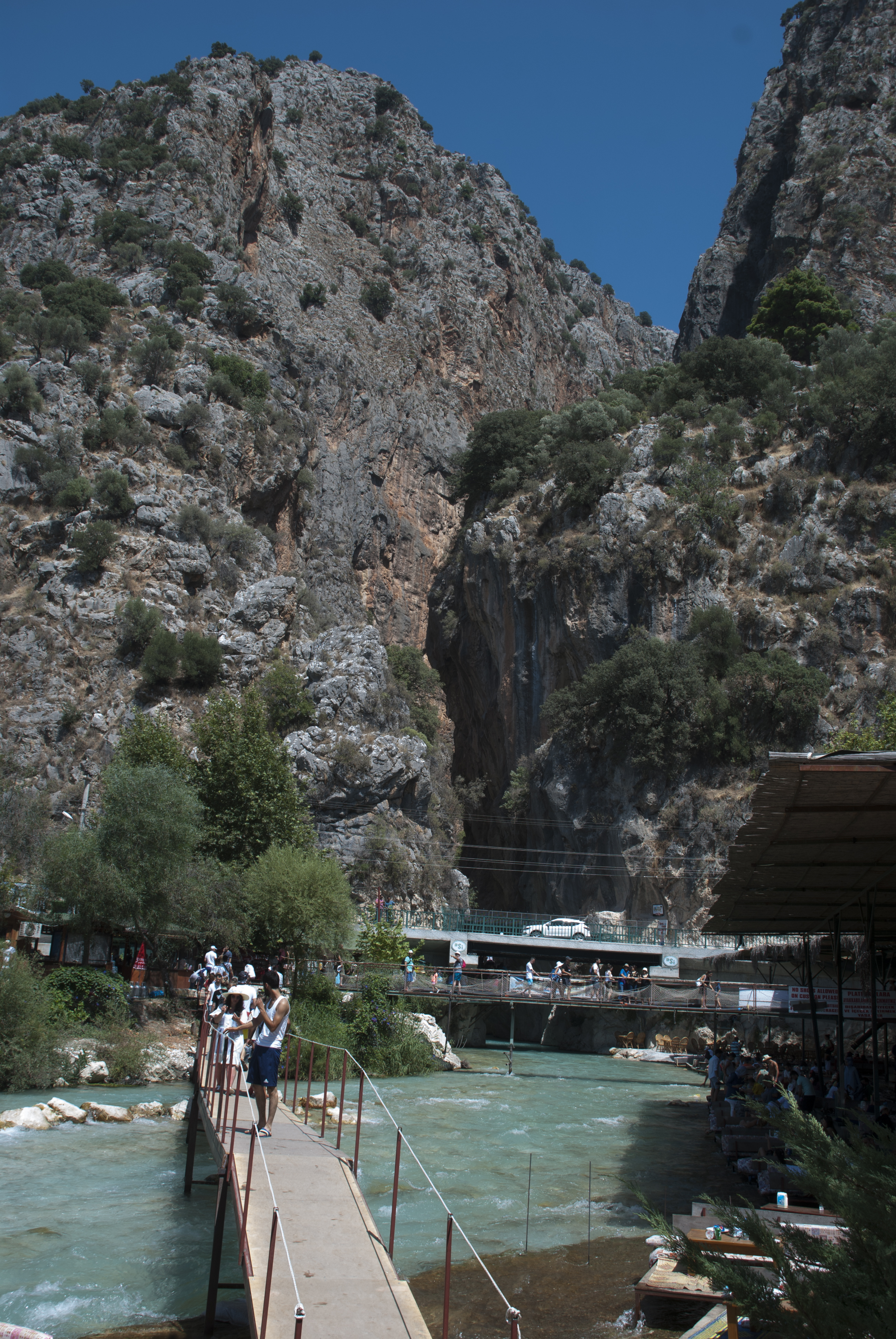

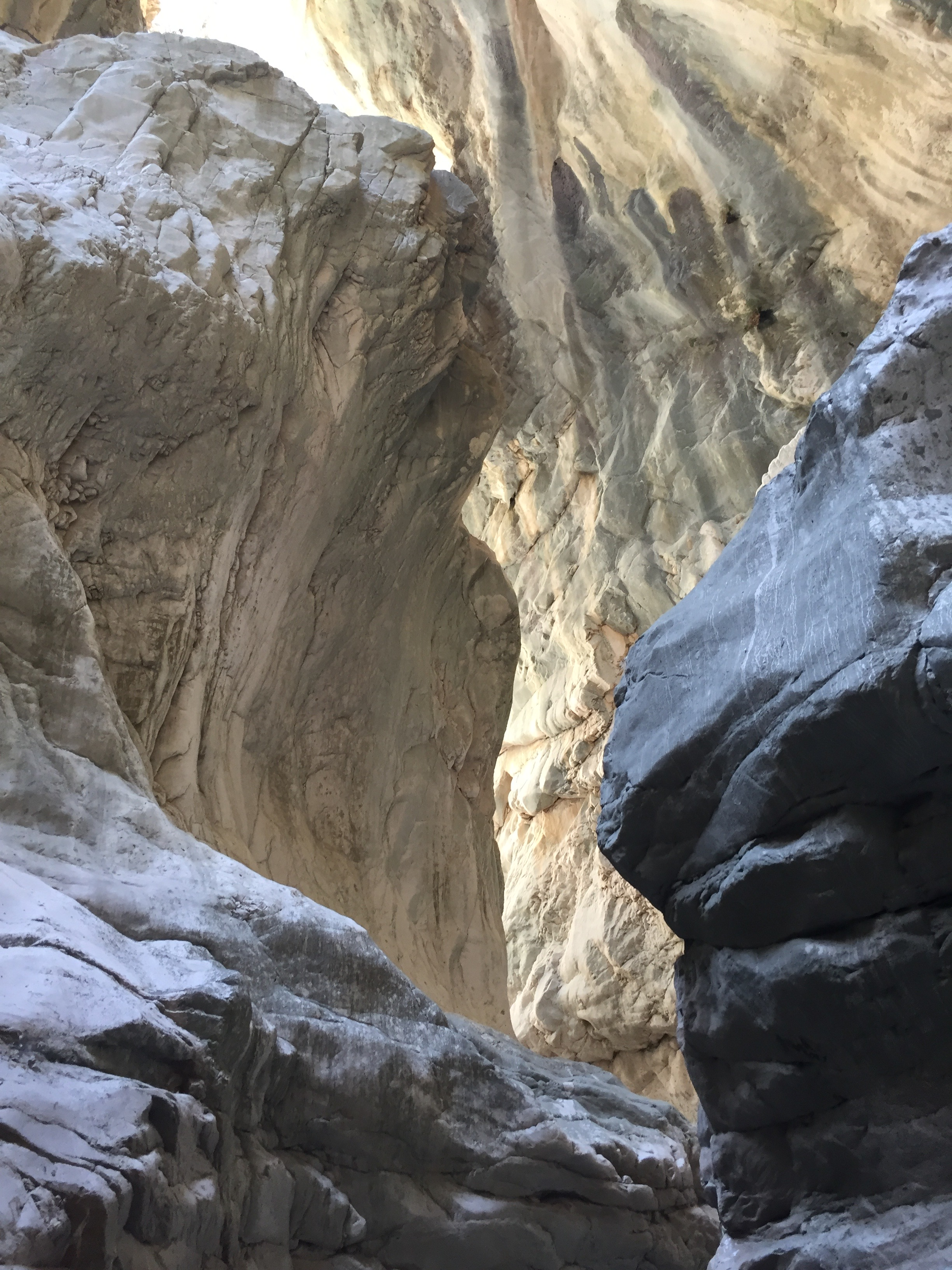

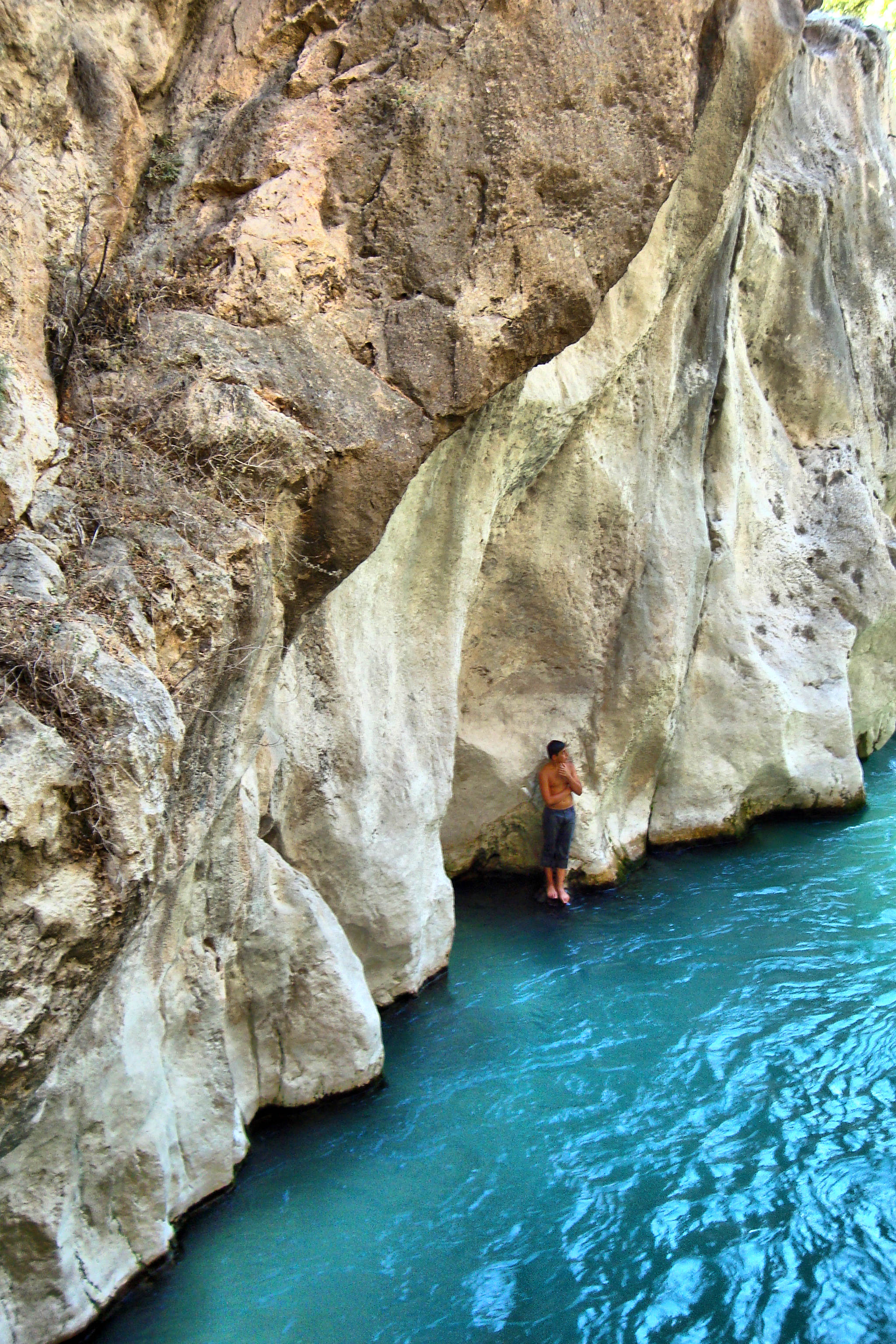
