= Derebucak Çamlık Caves National Park =

National park in Turkey

- Derebucak Çamlık Mağaraları Milli Parkı
- Location within Turkey
- Location: Ankara Province, Turkey
- Nearest city: Derebucak
- Coordinates: 37°21′49″N 31°38′30″E
- Area: 1,147 ha (2,830 acres)
- Established: 7 June 2022; 4 years ago
- Governing body: Directorate-General of Nature Protection and National Parks; Ministry of Agriculture and Forestry

Derebucak Çamlık Caves National Park (Turkish: Derebucak Çamlık Mağaraları Millî Parkı), established on 7 June 2022, is the 47th national park in Turkey containing a group of caves located in the Derebucak district of Konya Province, central Anatolia. The caves are registered together a natural monument of the country.

== Overview ==
Derebucak Çamlık Caves are a group of 13 caves in total located at Çamlık village of Derebucak district in Konya Province. The caves were registered a natural monument in 2013.

== National park ==
The area containing the 13 caves was declared the 47th national park in Turkey on 9 June 2022. The national park is administrated by the Directoriate-General of Nature Protection and National Parks at the Ministry of Agriculture and Forestry.

In the national park, which stretches over 1,147 ha (2,830 acres), there are 13 caves and sinkholes, of which Körükini, Suluin, Balatini, Asmacıini, Çocuk Attıkları Delik, Saklı Uçurum, Derevend, Baraj, Eski Düden, Dede Tarlası Düdeni, Gavur Beşiği and Dölek Düdeni are the most important.

Balatini Cave is the longest caves in Konya. Suluin Cave is a very ornate cave, which is suitable for boating, especially in the summer months when touristic activities increase. Deverend Cave and Döllüköğü Cave also have a geomorphological richness that can attract the attention of visitors. Mastaltı Cave, Dede Tarlası Sinkhole and Çocuk Attıcı Sinkhole are ideal caves for visitors, who want to have a vertical-semi-inclined cave experience, suitable for guided descent.

The Balat Stream passes through the national park, and gives life to karst formations, pine forests and fauna elements, constitutes other resource values. The steepness of the land creates suitable habitats for wildlife.

Wild goat (Capra aegagrus), which is endangered on a global scale, is among the local wildlife species. Woolly Rock Sleeper (Dryomys laniger), a mammal species endemic to the Mediterranean Region, also lives in this area. The region between Derebucak-Çamlık-Akseki-İbradı and including Çamlık Caves is among the Important Bird Areas of Turkey.
