= Commander-in-Chief National Historic Park =

National park in Turkey

Commander-in-Chief National Historic Park Başkomutan Tarihi Milli Parkı
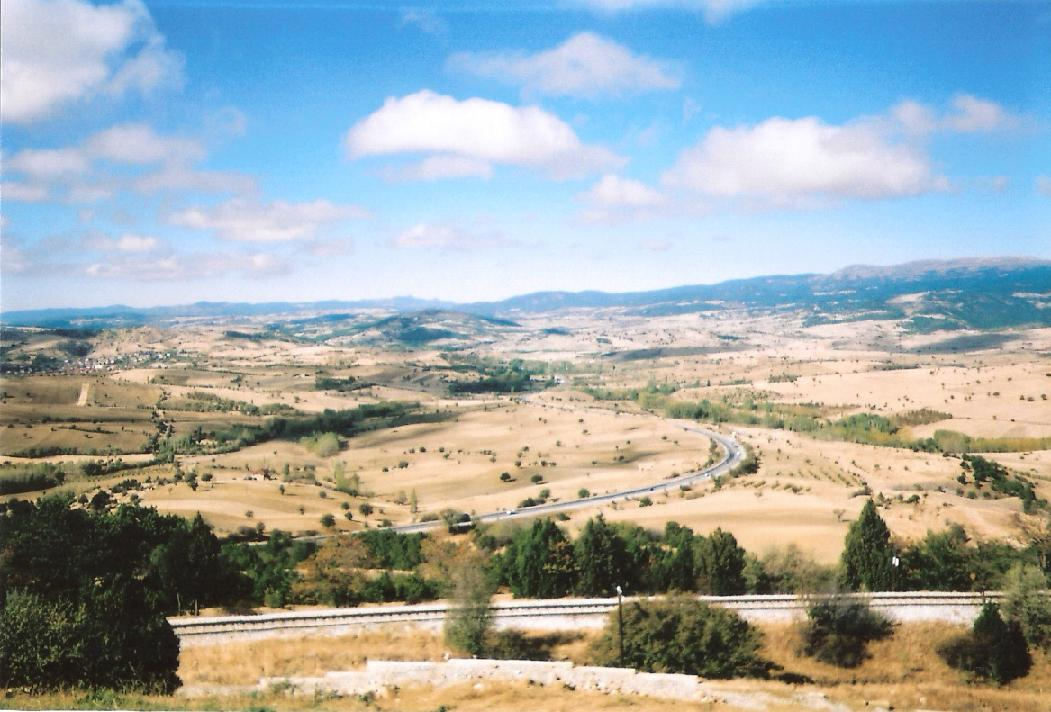
- A view from the Dumlupunar battleground in the national historic park.

- Location of the national historic park in Turkey
- 38°47′39.35″N 30°23′04.17″E
- Type: Military historic
- Location: Afyonkarahisar, Kütahya, Uşak

History
- Established: November 8, 1981; 44 years ago
- Original use: Battleground

Site notes
- Elevation: avg. 1,000 m (3,300 ft)
- Area: 40,948 ha (101,180 acres)
- Visitors: National historic park

The Commander-in-Chief National Historic Park (Turkish: Başkomutan Tarihi Milli Parkı) is a historic site of national historic significance associated with the Turkish War of Independence (Turkish: İstiklâl Savaşı) comprising the battleground of the last battle (Turkish: Başkumandanlık Meydan Muharebesi, literally "Field Battle of the Commander-in-Chief") in the Greco-Turkish War (1919–22).
