= Konya =

- Metropolitan municipality
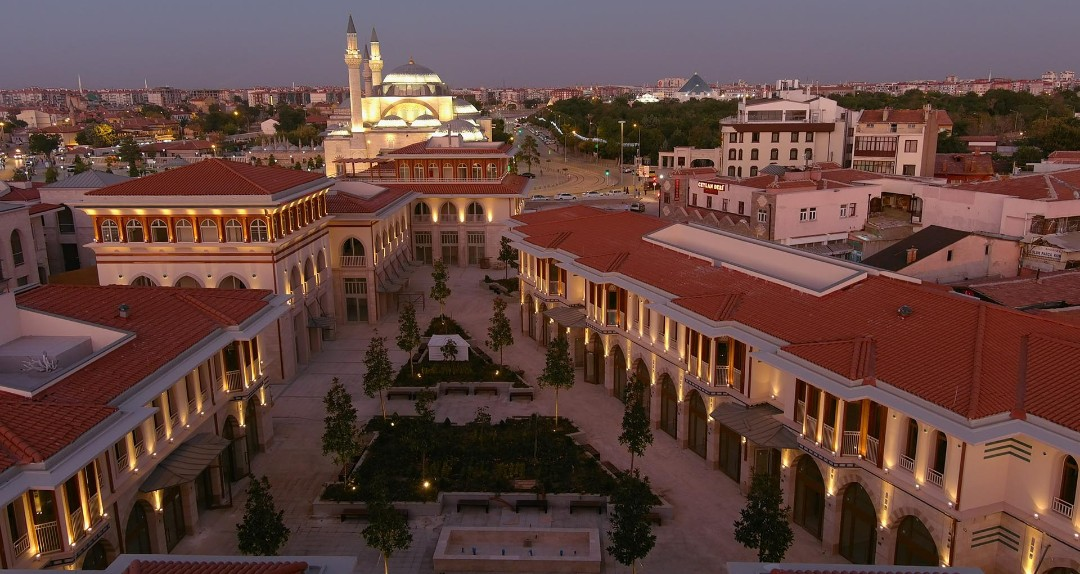
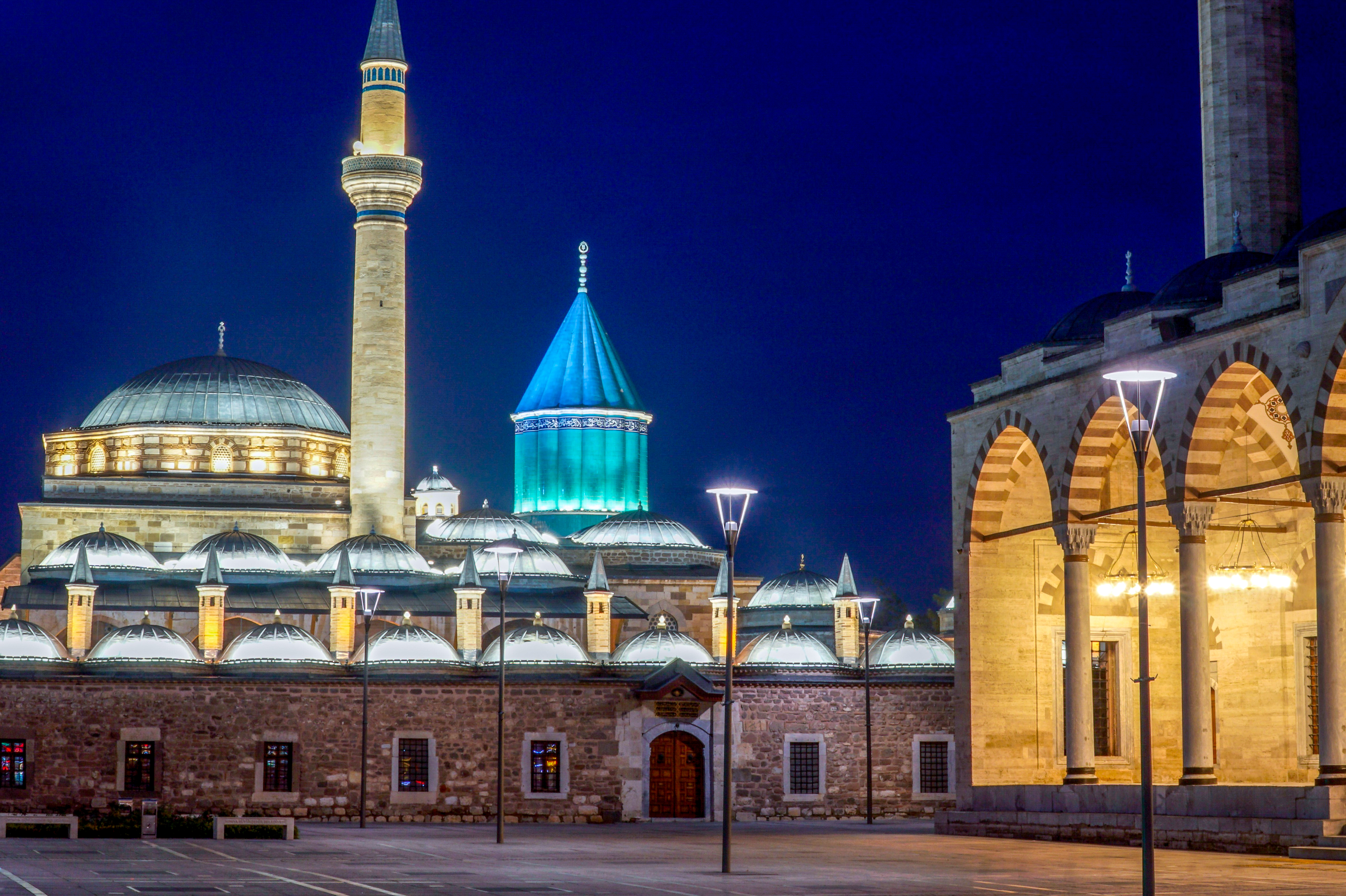
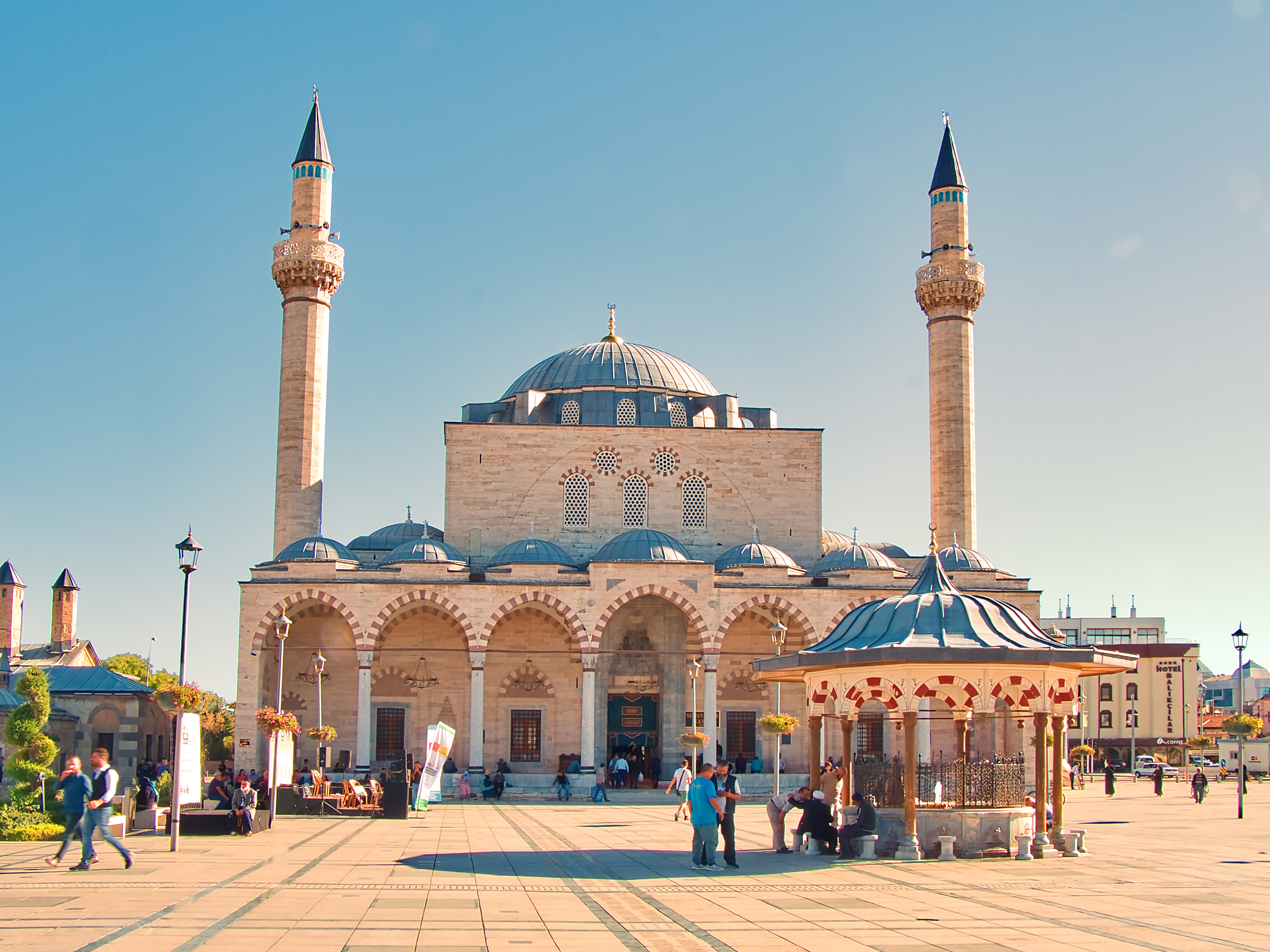
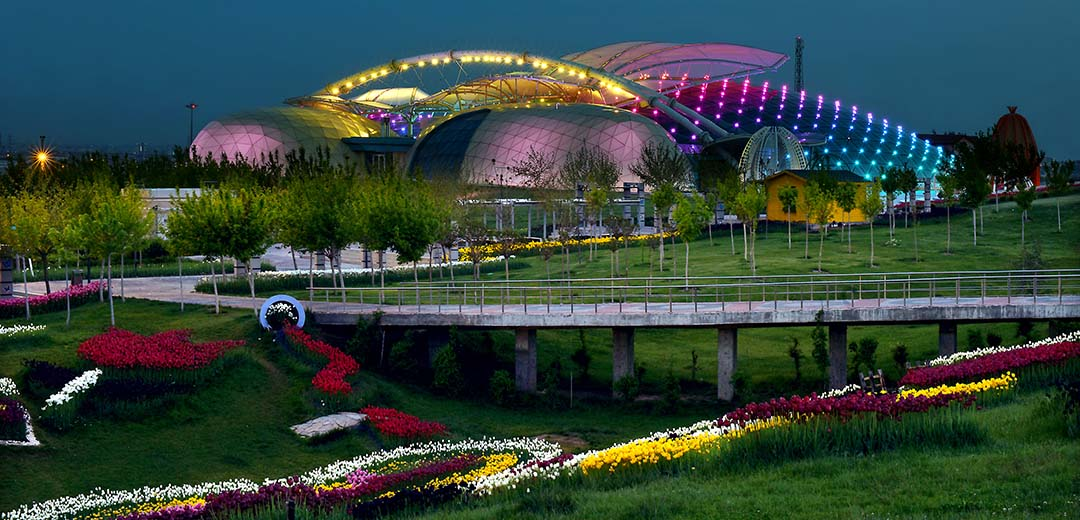
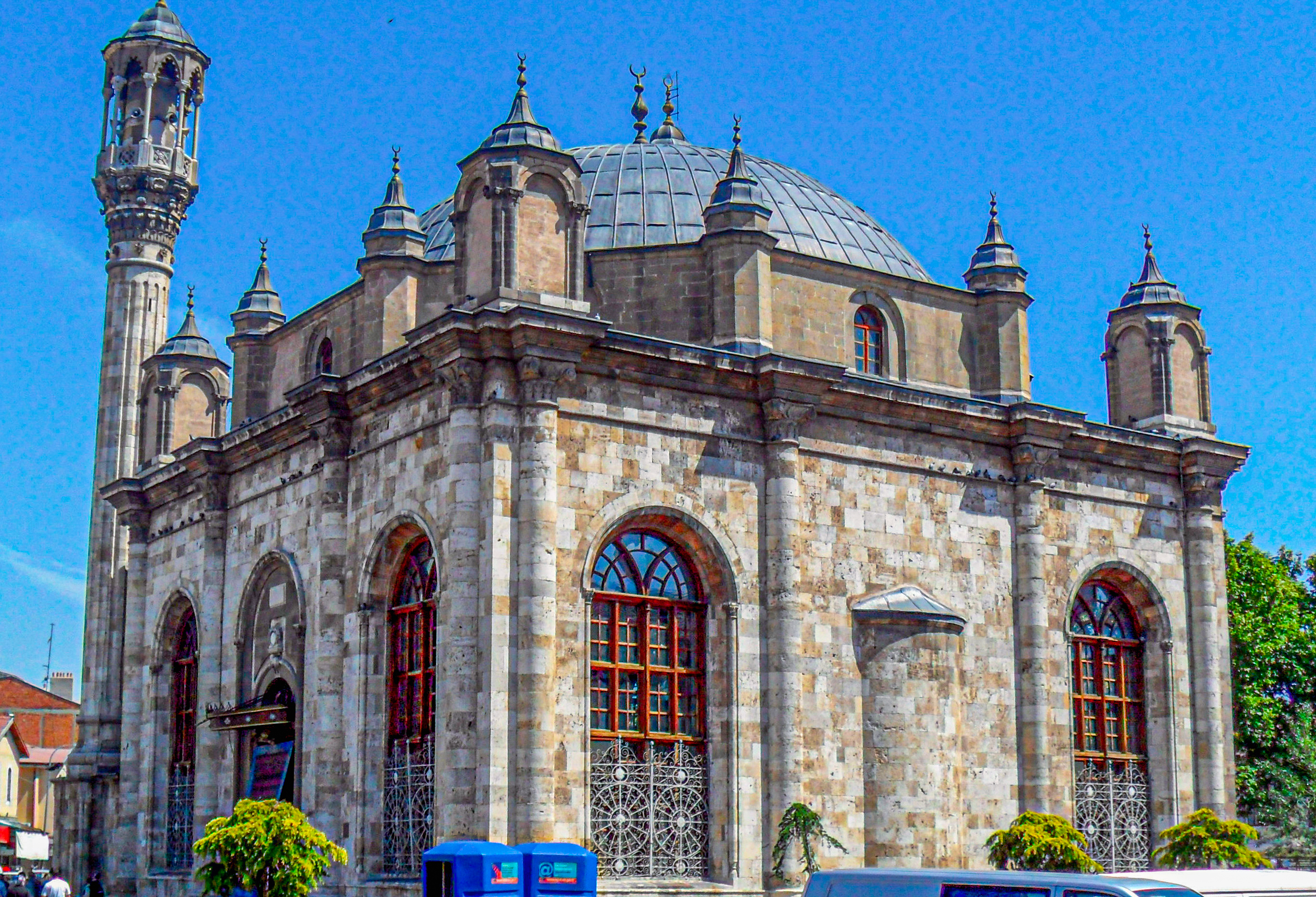
- Clockwise from top: Konya city as viewed from the Türbeönü Çarşıları; Selimiye Mosque; Aziziye Mosque; Konya Tropical Butterfly Garden; and Mevlana Museum

- Emblem of Konya Metropolitan Municipality

- Location of Konya, Turkey Konya (Asia) Konya (Earth)
- Coordinates: 37°52′28″N 32°29′35″E
- Country: Turkey
- Region: Central Anatolia
- Province: Konya

Government
  - Mayor: Uğur İbrahim Altay (AK Party)

Area
  - Metropolitan municipality: 38,873 km^{2} (15,009 sq mi)
  - Urban: 6,600 km^{2} (2,500 sq mi)
  - Metro: 6,600 km^{2} (2,500 sq mi)
- Elevation: 1,016 m (3,333 ft)

Population (2024 official number of TÜIK)
  - Metropolitan municipality: 2,330,024
  - Density: 59.939/km^{2} (155.24/sq mi)
  - Urban: 1,433,861
  - Urban density: 220/km^{2} (560/sq mi)
- Demonym: Konyalı (Turkish)

GDP (nominal, 2024)
  - Metropolitan municipality: ₺951.585 billion (US$29.023 billion)
  - Per capita: ₺388,841 (US$11,860)
- Time zone: UTC+3 (TRT)
- Postal code: 42XXX
- Area code: (+90) 332
- Licence plate: 42
- Website: www.konya.bel.tr

Konya (Note: Turkish pronunciation: [ˈkoɲ.ja]) is a major city in central Turkey, on the southwestern edge of the Central Anatolian Plateau, and is the capital of Konya Province. During ancient history and into Seljuk times it was known as Iconium. In 19th-century accounts of the city in English its name is usually spelt Konia or Koniah. In the Late Middle Ages, Konya was the capital of the Seljuk Turks' Sultanate of Rum, from where the sultans ruled over Anatolia. Today it is the spiritual centre of the Mevlevi Order, famous for its Whirling Dervishes.

As of 2024, the population of the Metropolitan Province was 2,330,024. 1,433,861 live in the three urban districts (Karatay, Selcuklu, Meram), making Konya the sixth most populous city in Turkey, and second most populous of the Central Anatolia Region, after Ankara. The city is served by TCDD high-speed train (YHT) services from Istanbul, Ankara and Karaman. The local airport (Konya Havalimanı, KYA) is served by frequent flights from Istanbul whereas flights to and from İzmir are offered several times a week.

== Name ==
Konya is believed to correspond to the Late Bronze Age toponym Ikkuwaniya known from Hittite records. This placename is regarded as Luwian in origin. During classical antiquity and the medieval period it was known as Ἰκόνιον (Ikónion) in Greek and as Iconium in Latin.

A folk etymology holds that the name Ikónion was derived from εἰκών ('icon'), referring to an ancient Greek legend according to which the hero Perseus vanquished the native population with an image of the "Gorgon Medusa's head" before founding the city.

Konya was known as Dârülmülk to the Rum Seljuks.

== History ==
=== Overview ===
The Konya region has been inhabited since the third millennium BC and fell at different times under the rule of the Hittites, the Phrygians, the Greeks, the Persians and the Romans. In the 11th century the Seljuk Turks conquered the area and began ruling over its Rûm (Byzantine Greek) inhabitants, making Konya the capital of their new Sultanate of Rum. Under the Seljuks, the city reached the height of its wealth and influence. Following their demise, Konya came under the rule of the Karamanids, before being taken over by the Ottoman Empire in the 15th century. After the Turkish War of Independence the city became part of the modern Republic of Turkey.

=== Ancient history ===
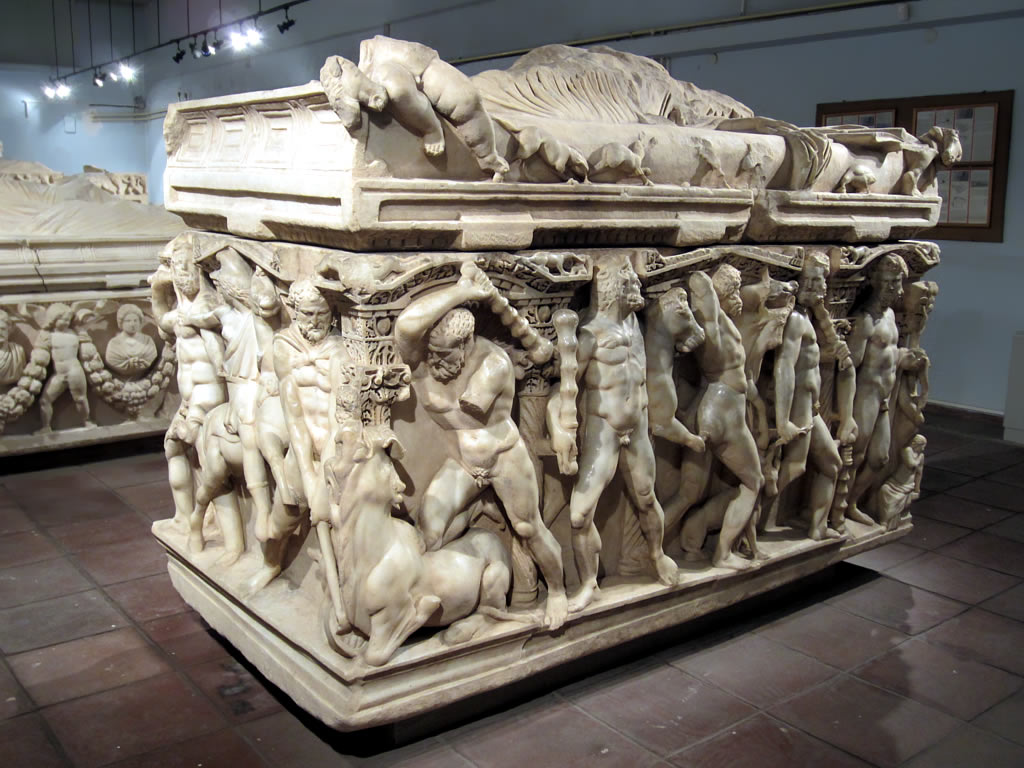
Hercules Sarcophagus (c. 250–260) in the Konya Archaeological Museum

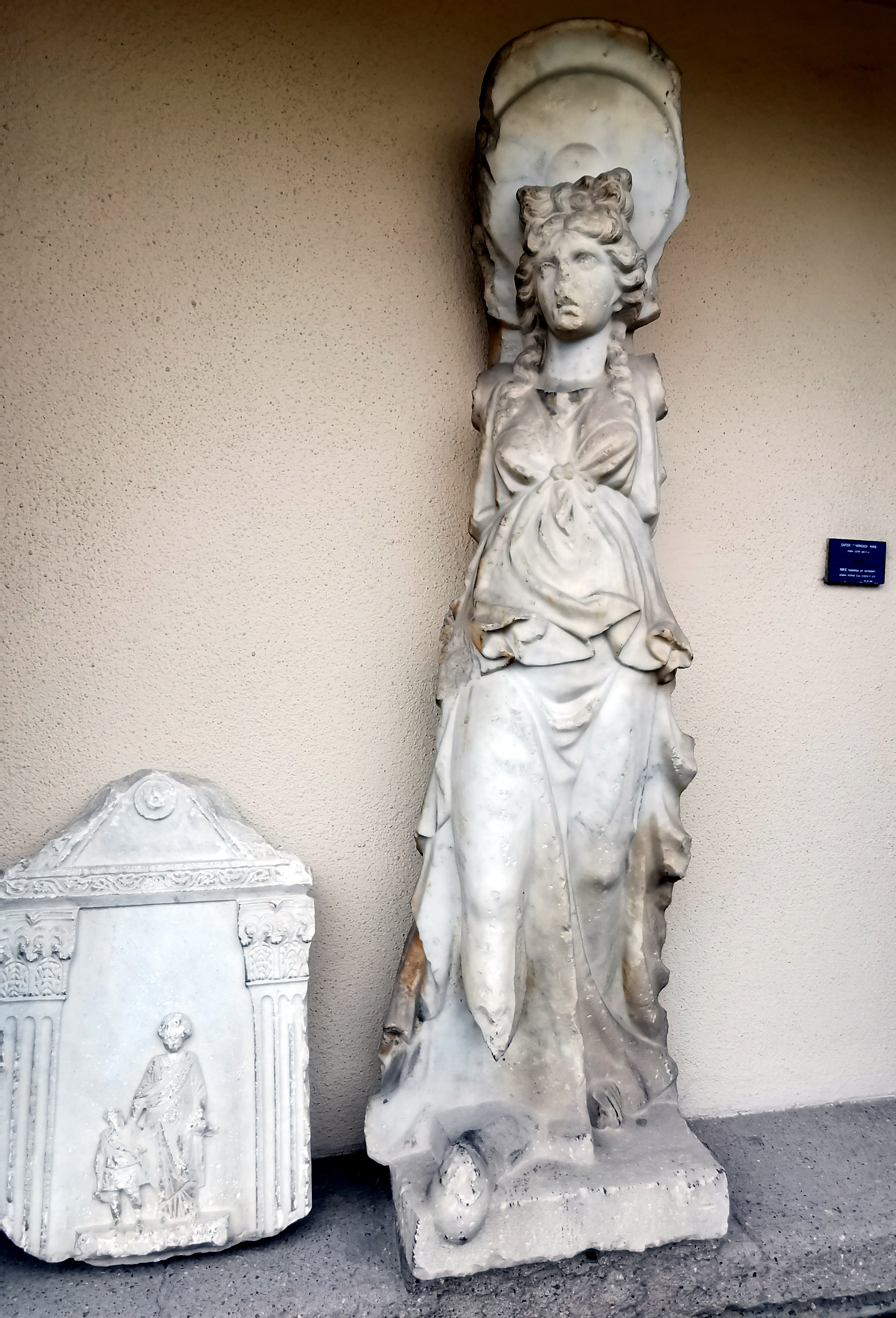
A marble statue of Nike, the Ancient Greek goddess located in Konya Archaeological Museum

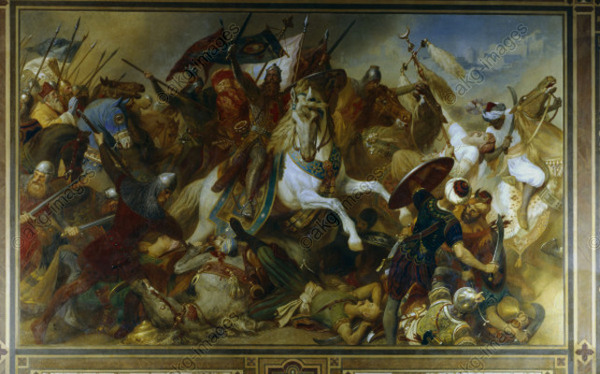
“Barbarossa’s victory at Iconium” at the Battle of Iconium, whereby Frederick I Barbarossa captures Iconium by Hermann Wislicenus c. 1890.

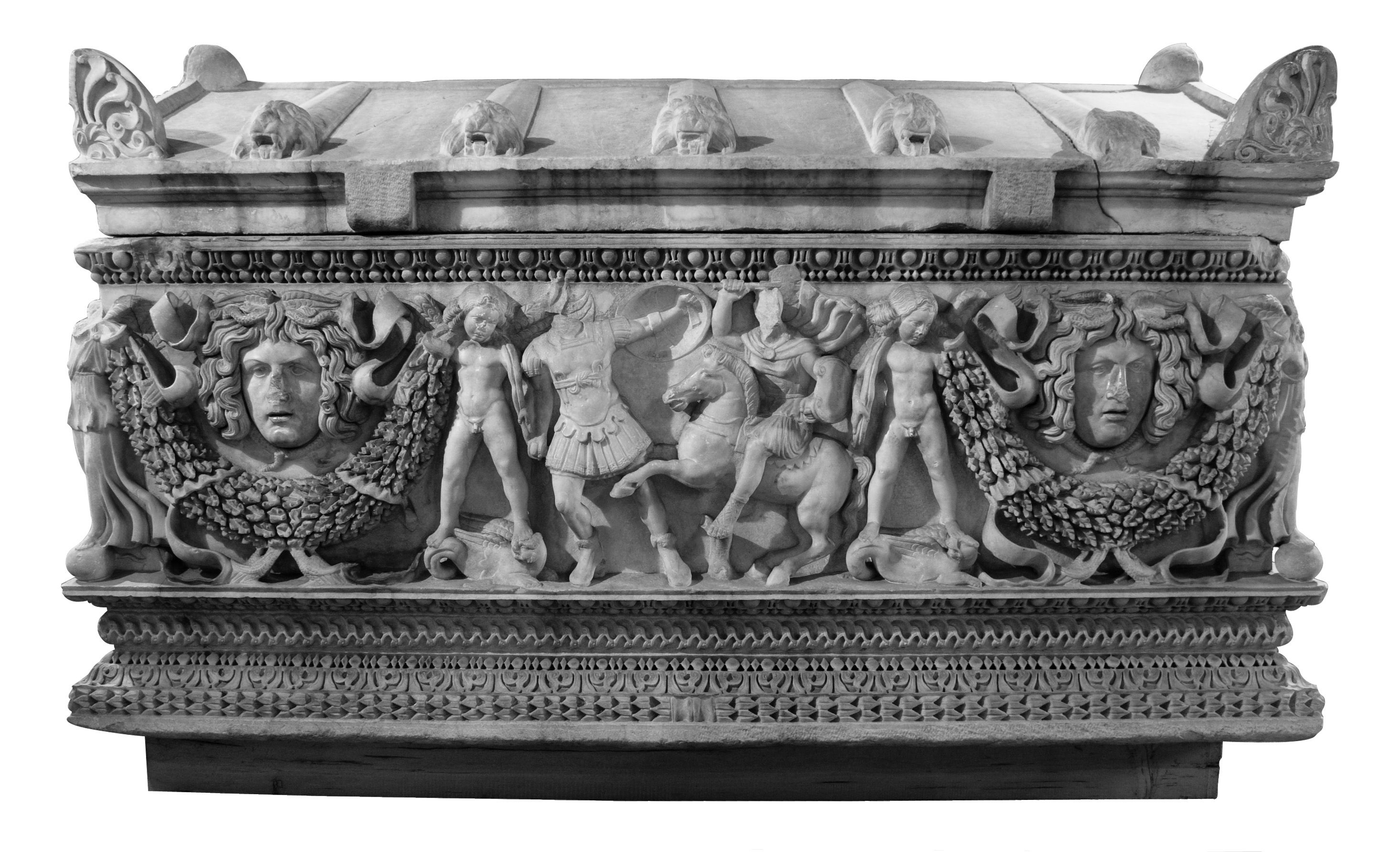
Marble Sarcophagus, typical of Pamphylia. Roman period, 3rd century AD, in the Konya Archaeological Museum

Excavations have shown that the region was inhabited during the Late Copper Age, around 3000 BC.

The Phrygians established their kingdom in central Anatolia in the eighth century BC and Xenophon describes Iconium (as the city was originally called) as the last city of Phrygia. The region was overwhelmed by Cimmerian invaders c. 690 BC. Later it formed part of the Persian Empire, until Darius III was defeated by Alexander the Great in 333 BC. Alexander's empire broke up shortly after his death and the town came under the rule of Seleucus I Nicator.

Historical affiliations

Hittites c. 1600–1200 BC
Phrygia c. 800–695 BC
Achaemenid Empire c. 547–333 BC
Macedonian Empire 333–323 BC
Kingdom of Lycaonia c. 323–17 BC
Roman Empire 17 BC–395 AD
Byzantine Empire 395–1077
Seljuk Empire 1077–1080s
Sultanate of Rum 1080s–1308
Karamanids 1308–1467
Ottoman Empire 1467–1922
Turkey 1923–present

During the Hellenistic period the town was ruled by the kings of Pergamon. As Attalus III, the last king of Pergamon, was about to die without an heir, he bequeathed his kingdom to the Roman Republic. Once incorporated into the Roman Empire, under emperor Claudius, the city's name was changed to Claudiconium. During the reign of emperor Hadrianus it was known as Colonia Aelia Hadriana.

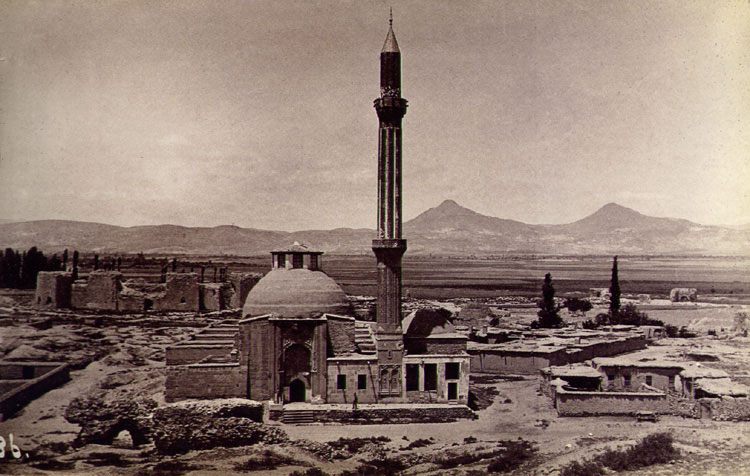
John Henry Haynes. Konya's Ince Minareli Medrese. 1901.

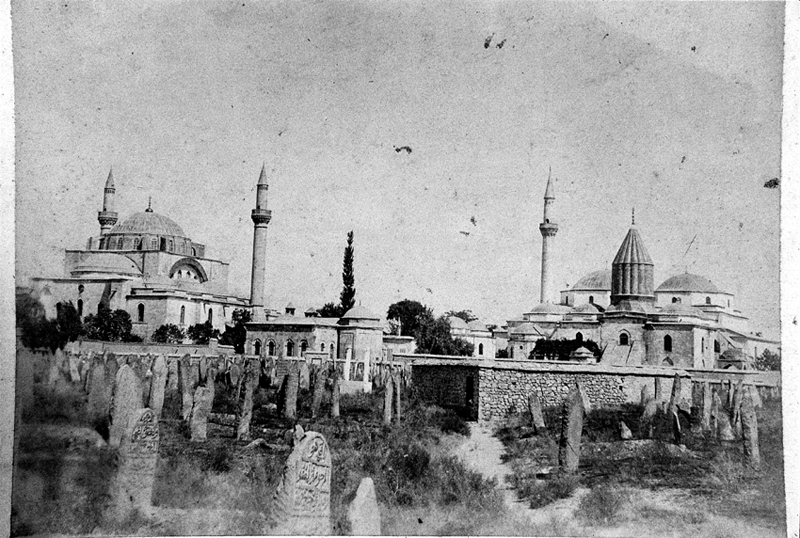
Üçler Cemetery in Konya. In the background are the Mausoleum of Mevlana and the Sultan Selim Mosque.

=== Saint Paul and Iconium ===
Paul and Silas probably visited Konya during Paul's Second Missionary Journey in about AD 50, as well as near the beginning of his Third Missionary Journey several years later.

According to the apocryphal Acts of Paul and Thecla, Iconium was also the birthplace of Saint Thecla, who saved the city from attack by the Isaurians in 354.

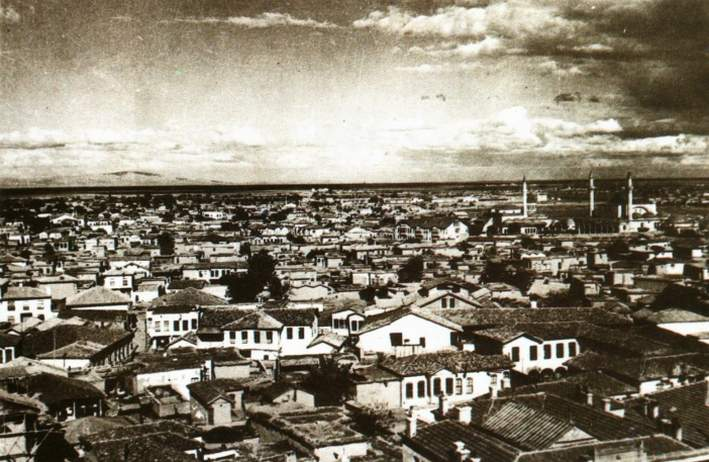
An old photo of Konya with an unknown date.

=== Byzantine Era ===
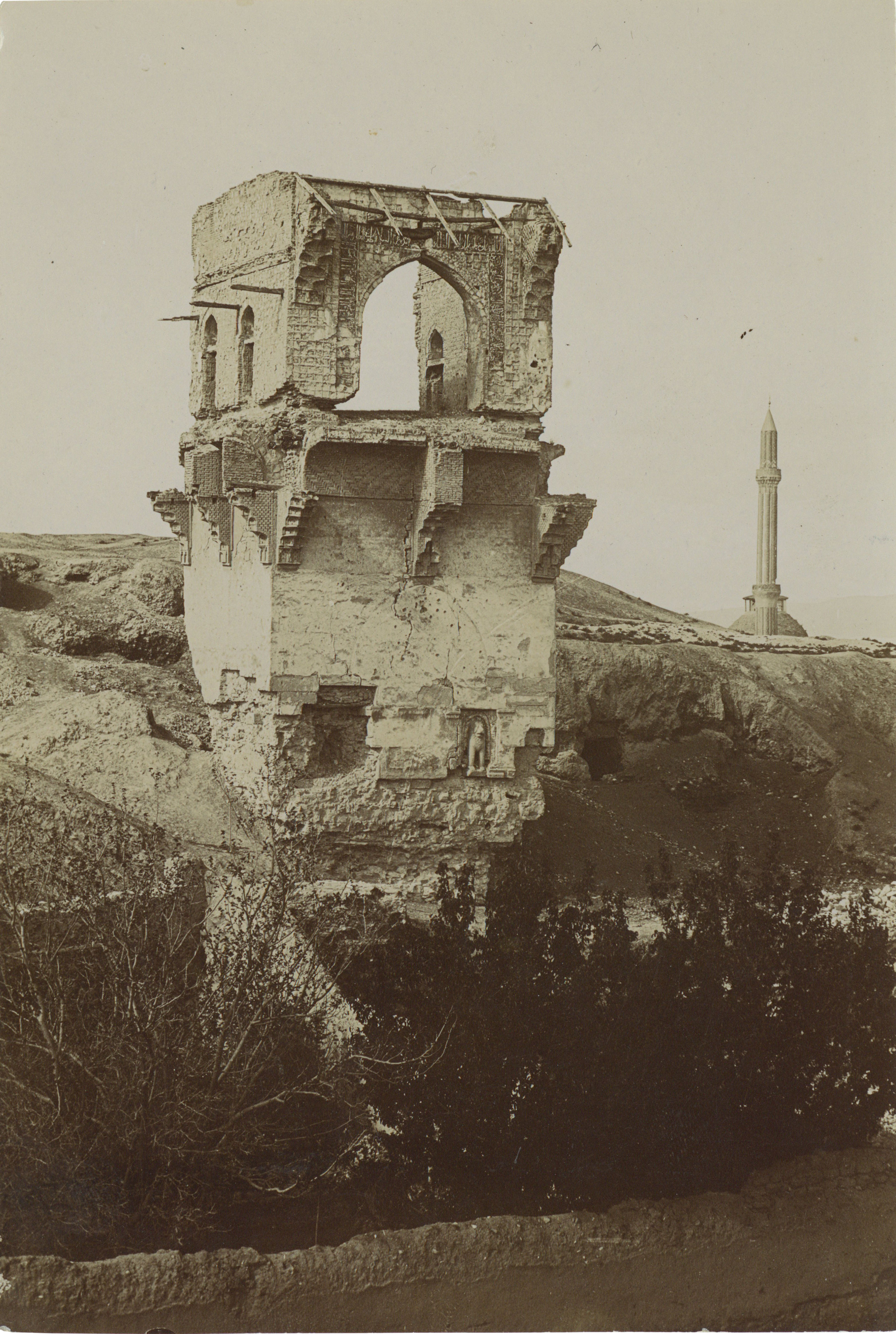
Kılıç Arslan II Kiosk, Konya Seljuk Palace. 19th century, by Garabed K. Solakian.

Under the Byzantine Empire, the city became the seat of a bishop, and in c. 370 was raised to the status of a metropolitan see for Lycaonia, with Saint Amphilochius as the first metropolitan bishop. In the 7th century it became part of the Anatolic Theme and was, together with the nearby (Caballa) Kaballah Fortress (Turkish: Gevale Kalesi) (location) a frequent target of Arab attacks during the Arab–Byzantine wars in the eighth to tenth century, being captured by Arabs in 723–724. The rebellious general Andronikos Doukas used the Kaballah fortress as his base in 905–906. During the tenth or eleventh century the church of Saint Amphilochius was constructed inside the citadel of Kaballa, housing the tomb of the saint which the Turks later believed to be the tomb of Plato, renaming the church to Eflâtun Mescidi (mosque of Plato). The monastery of Saint Chariton, another local from Iconium, was located a few miles away in Sylata.

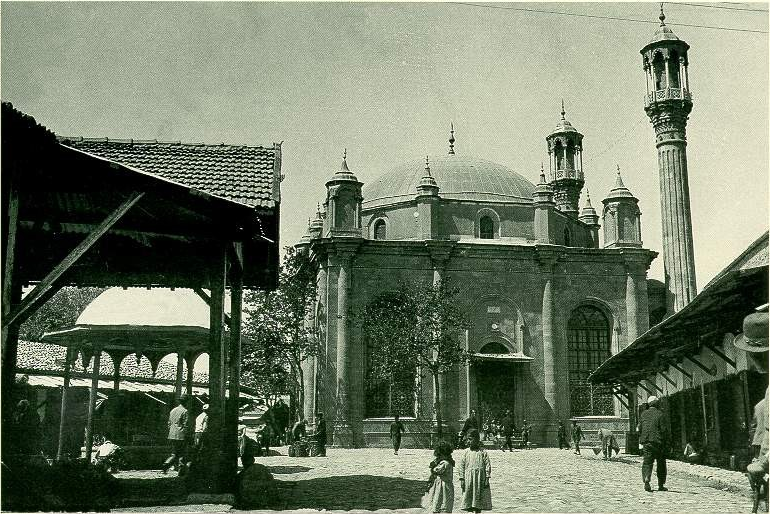
An old photograph of the Aziziye Mosque in Konya.

The Seljuk commander Afshin attacked Iconium in 1069, but was defeated by Manuel Komnenos. However, he returned a few months later, defeated a force led by Philaretos Brachamios and sacked the city. Following the Seljuk victory at the Battle of Manzikert in 1071, the Norman mercenary leader Roussel de Bailleul rose in revolt at Iconium. The city was conquered by the Seljuks in 1084.

=== Seljuk and Karamanid eras ===
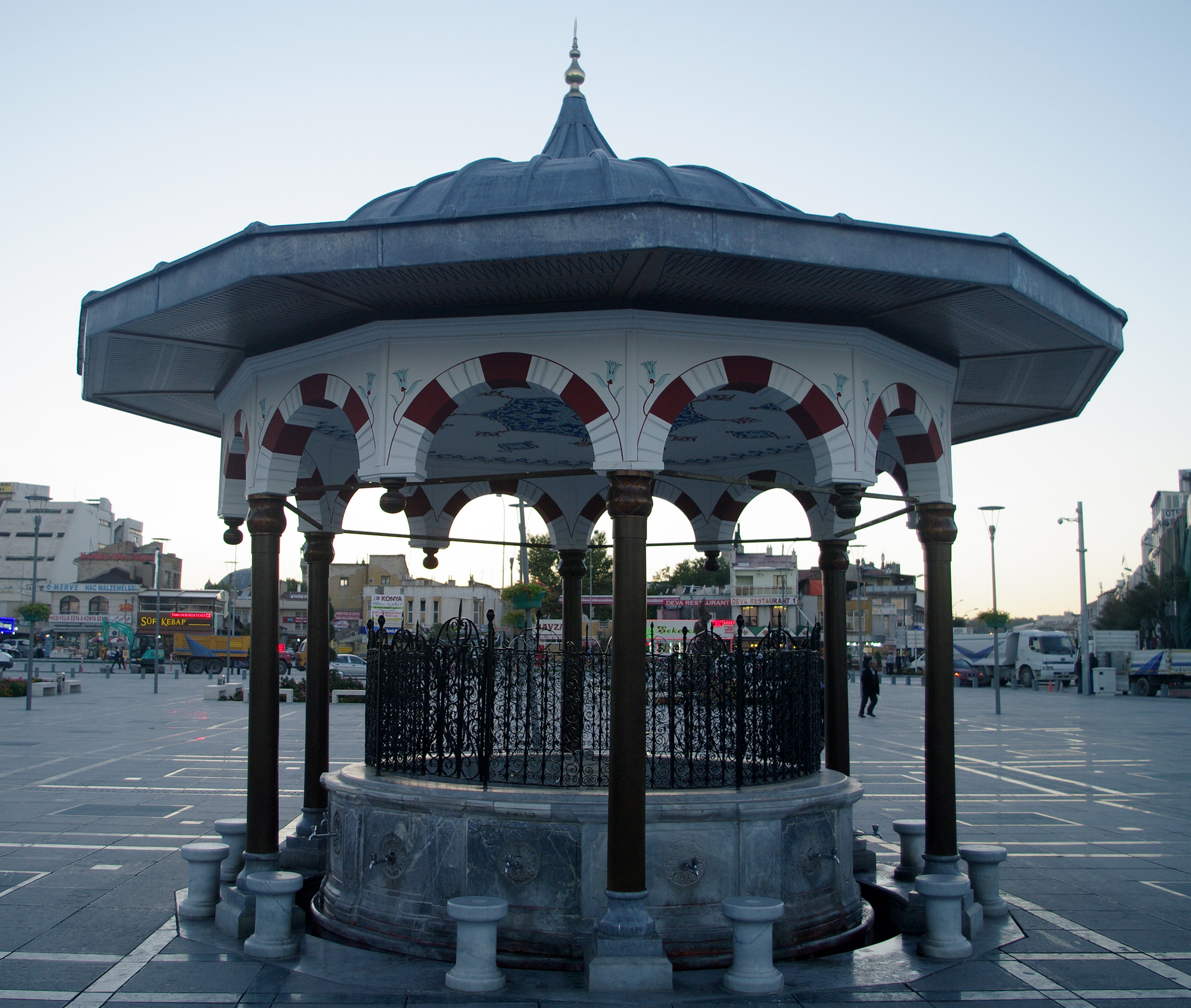
Late evening view of Mevlana Fountain opposite the Selimiye Mosque, Konya. Turkey

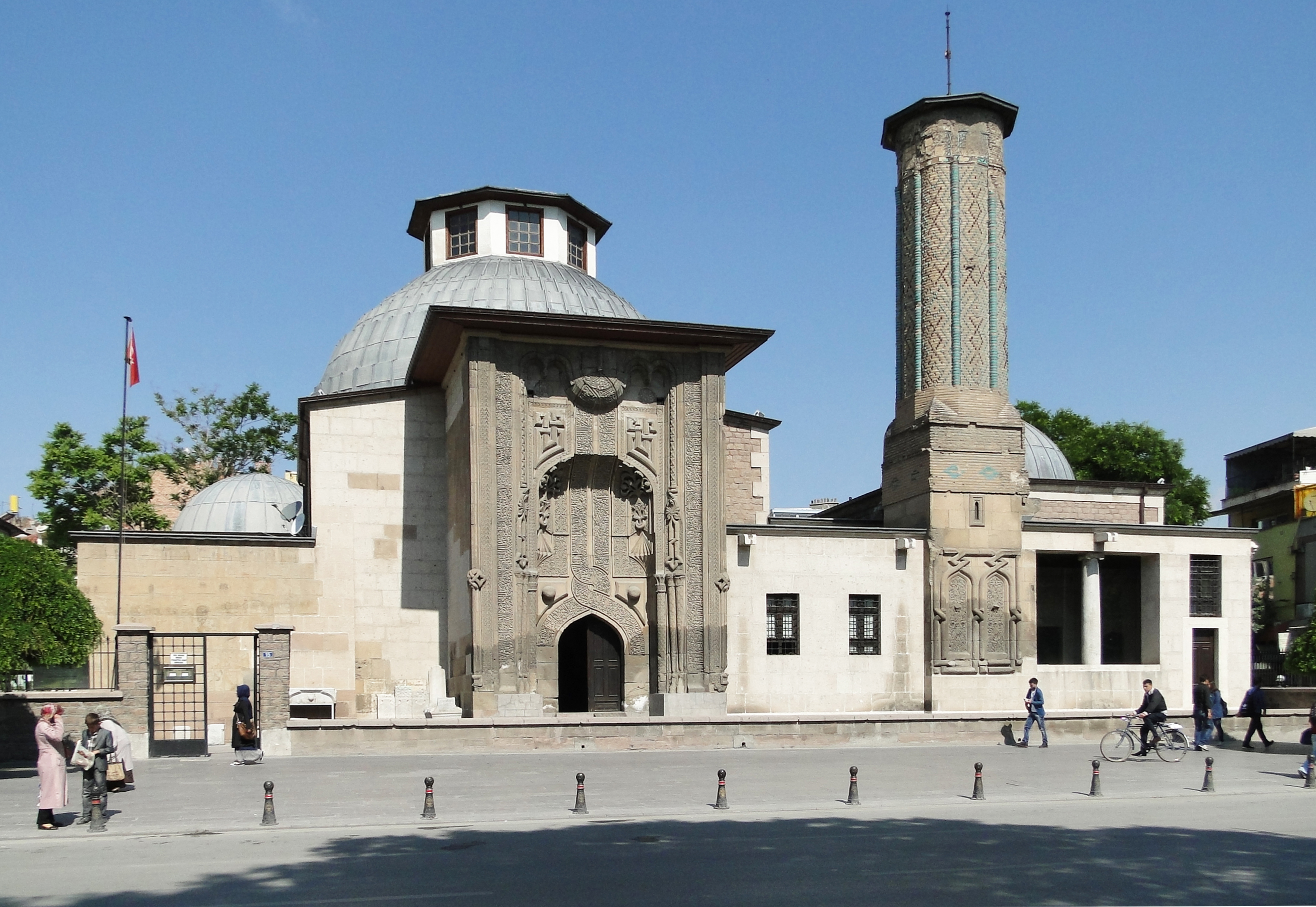
Ince Minaret Medrese (1279) in Konya

Iconium became the second capital of the Seljuk Sultanate of Rum after the fall of Nicaea until 1243. It was briefly occupied by the army of the First Crusade (August 1097) and Frederick Barbarossa (May 18, 1190) after the Battle of Iconium (1190). The area was reoccupied by the Turks after the Crusaders left.

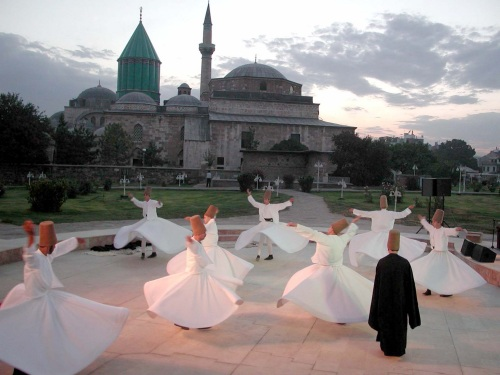
Established in 1273, the Sufi Mevlevi Order and its Whirling Dervishes are renowned symbols of Konya and Turkey.

Konya reached the height of its wealth and influence in the second half of the 12th century when the Seljuk sultans of Rum also subdued the Anatolian beyliks to their east, especially that of the Danishmends, thus establishing their rule over virtually all of eastern Anatolia,. They also acquired several port towns along the Mediterranean (including Alanya) and the Black Sea (including Sinop) and even gained a brief foothold in Sudak, Crimea. This golden age lasted until the first decades of the 13th century.

Many Persians and Persianised Turks from Persia and Central Asia migrated to Anatolian cities either to flee the invading Mongols or to benefit from the opportunities for educated Muslims in a newly established kingdom.

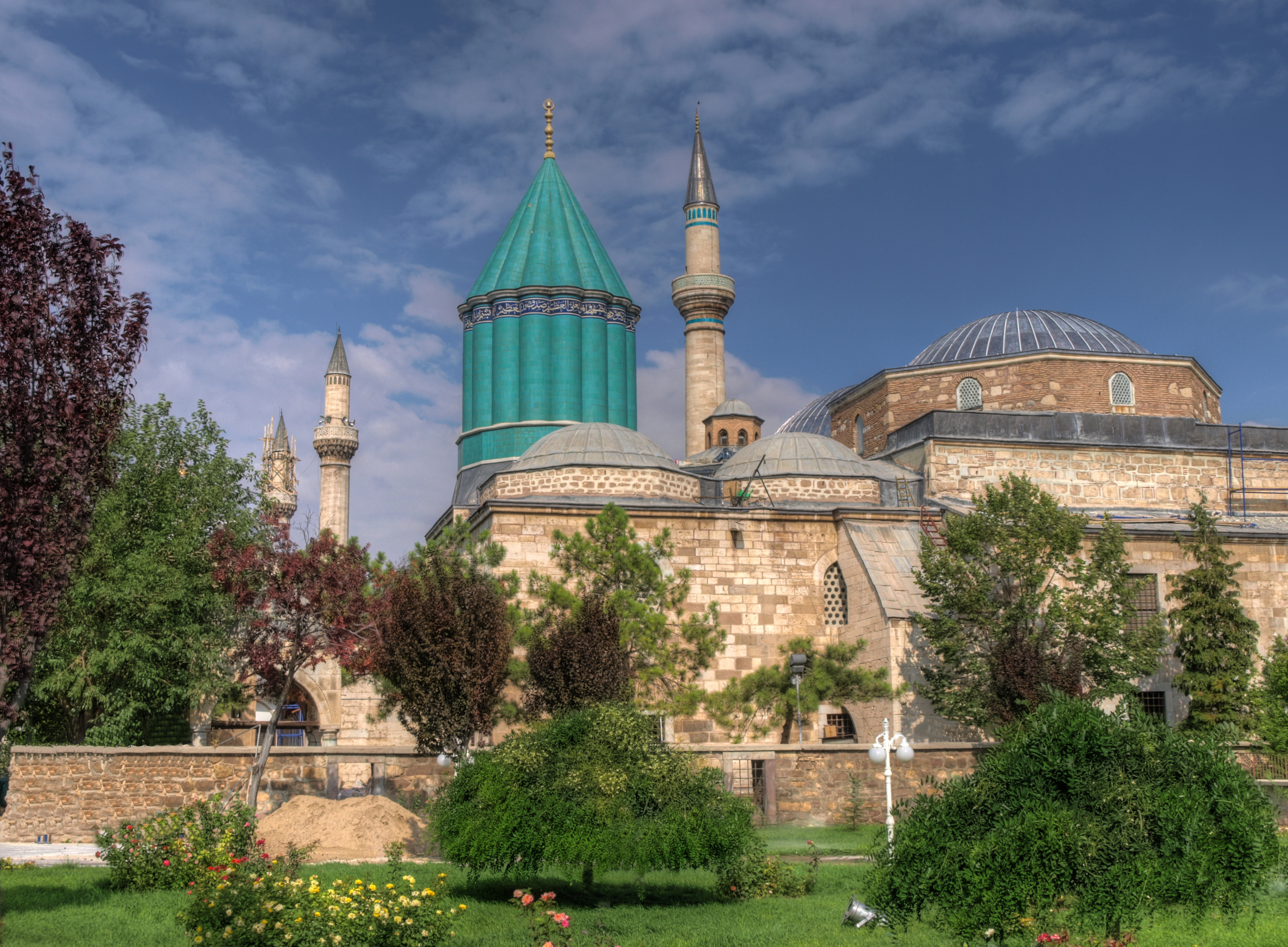
The Mevlana Museum (1274) is the last resting place of the Sufi mystic and poet Rumi in Konya, the capital of the Anatolian Seljuk Sultanate.

Following the fall of the Anatolian Seljuk Sultanate in 1307, Konya became the capital of the Eshrefids, a Turkish beylik, which lasted until 1322 when the city was captured by the neighbouring Beylik of Karamanoğlu. In 1420, the Beylik of Karamanoğlu fell to the Ottoman Empire and, in 1453, Konya was made the provincial capital of the Karaman Eyalet.

=== Ottoman Empire ===
Under Ottoman rule, Konya was administered by the Sultan's sons (Şehzade), starting with Şehzade Mustafa and Şehzade Cem (the sons of Sultan Mehmed II), and continuing with the future Sultan Selim II.

Between 1483 and 1864, Konya was the administrative capital of the Karaman Eyalet. During the reforming Tanzimat period, it became the seat of the larger Vilayet of Konya which replaced the Karaman Eyalet, as part of the new vilayet system introduced in 1864.

In 1832 Anatolia was invaded by Mehmed Ali Paşa of Kavala whose son, İbrahim Paşa, occupied Konya. Although he was driven out with the help of the European powers, Konya went into a decline after this, as described by the British traveller, William Hamilton, who visited in 1837 and found a scene 'of destruction and decay', as he recorded in his Researches in Asia Minor, Pontus and Armenia, published in 1842.

Konya's textile and mining industries flourished under the Ottomans.

=== Turkish Republic ===
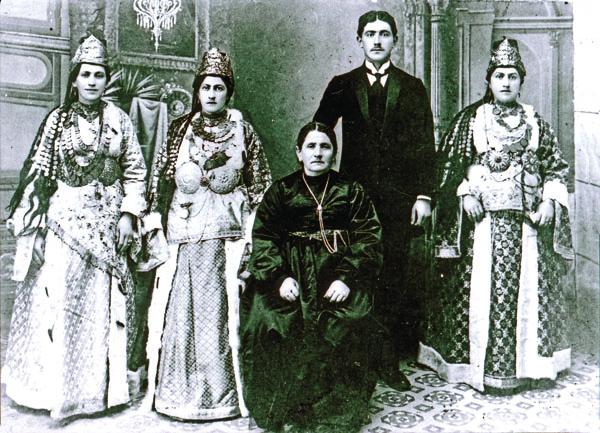
Greeks from nearby village of Sille in the 19th century

During the Turkish War of Independence (1919–1922) Konya was a major air base. In 1922, the air force, renamed as the Inspectorate of Air Forces, (Note: Turkic:Kuva-yı Havaiye Müfettişliği) was headquartered in Konya. Before 1923, 4,000 Orthodox, Turkish-speaking and Greek-speaking Christians lived there. The Greek community numbered approximately 2,500 people who maintained, at their own expense, a church, a boys' school and a girls' school. In 1923 during the population exchange between Greece and Turkey, the Greeks of the nearby village of Sille were forced to leave as refugees and resettle in Greece.

== Government ==
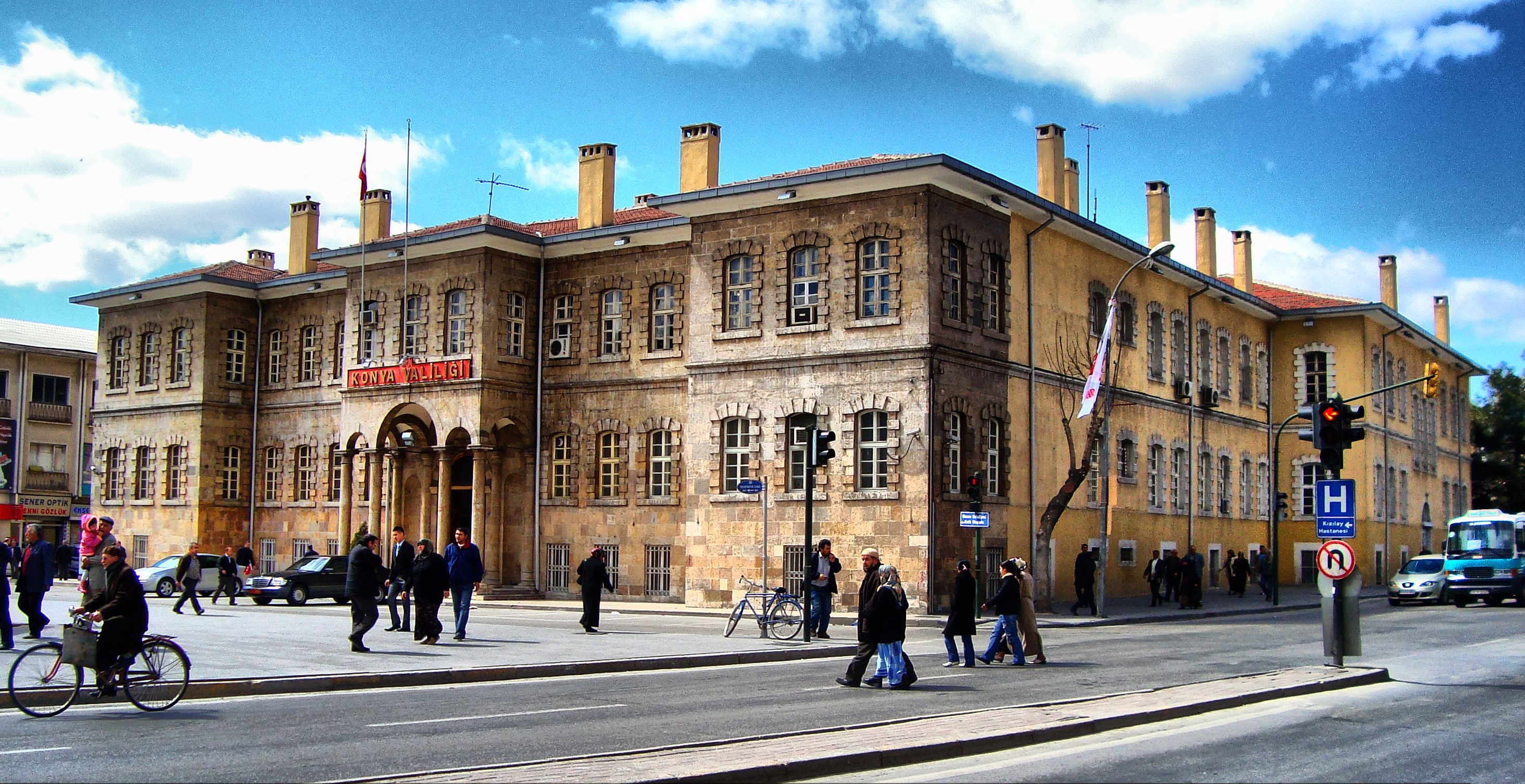
Konya Metropolitan Governor's Office

The first local administration in Konya was founded in 1830 and converted into a municipality in 1876. (Note: "İhtisab Agalıgi" (Islamic-Ottoman office for public regularity)) In March 1989, the municipality became a Metropolitan Municipality. As of that date, Konya had three central district municipalities (Meram, Selçuklu, Karatay) and a Metropolitan Municipality.

== Economy ==
Home to several industrial parks. The city ranks among the Anatolian Tigers. In 2012 exports from Konya reached 130 countries. A number of Turkish industrial conglomerates, such as Bera (ex Kombassan) Holding, have their headquarters in Konya. While agriculture-based industries play a role, the city's economy has evolved into a center for the manufacturing of components for the automotive industry; machinery manufacturing; agricultural tools; casting; plastic paints and chemicals; construction materials; paper and packaging; processed foods; textiles; and leather.

Turkey's largest solar farm is located 20 miles east of the city, near Karapınar.

== Geography ==
Konya sits in the center of the largest province, in the largest plain (Konya Plain), and is the seventh most heavily populated city in Turkey.

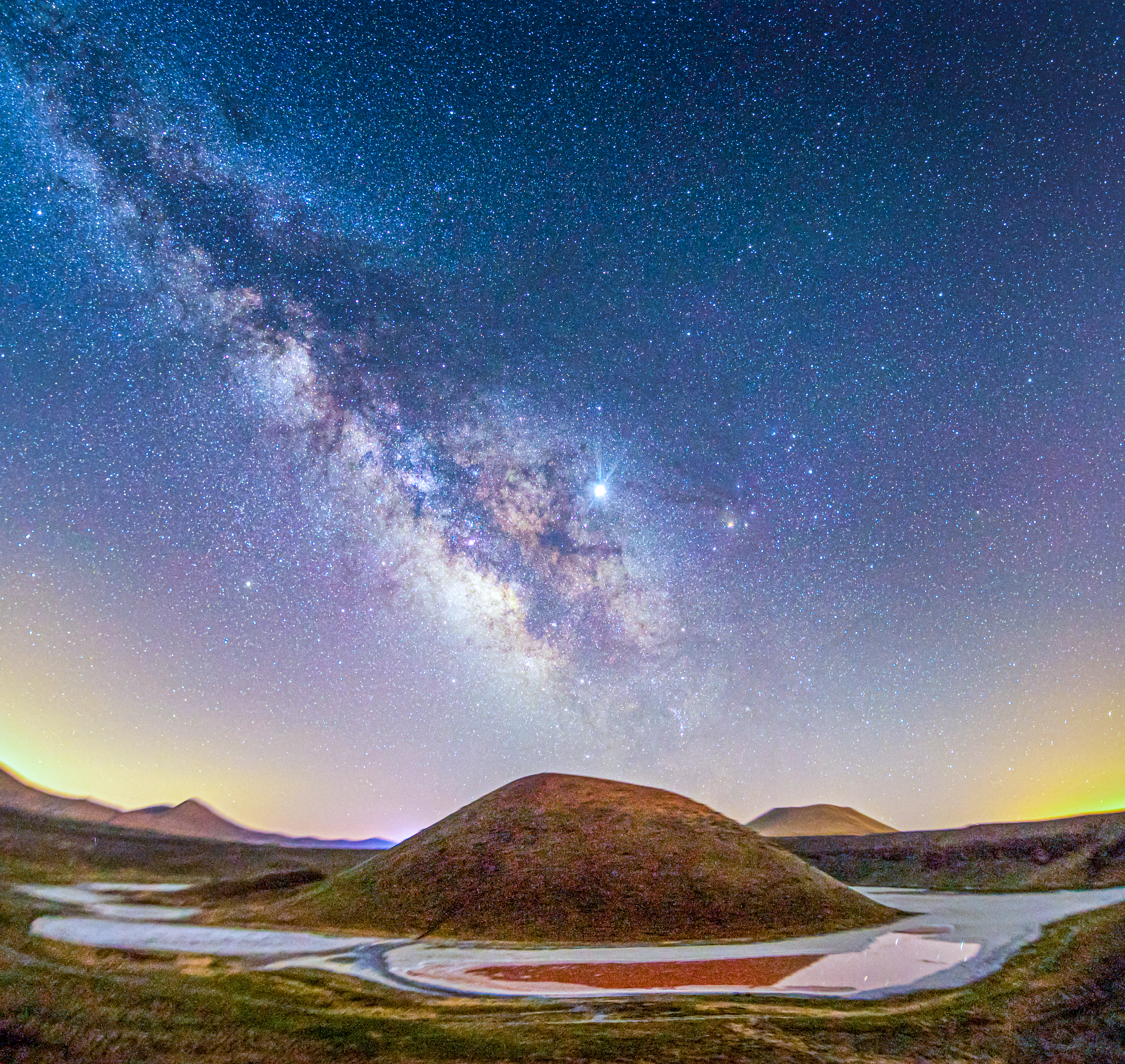
Lake Meke, a large crater lake in Konya Province

The city is in the southern part of the Central Anatolia Region with the southernmost side of the province hemmed in by the Taurus Mountains.

== Climate ==
Konya has a cold semi-arid climate (BSk) under the Köppen classification and a temperate continental (Dc) climate under the Trewartha classification.

Summer daytime temperatures average 30 °C (86 °F), although summer nights are cool. The highest temperature recorded in Konya was 40.9 °C (106 °F) on 14 August 2023, closely beating the former record of 40.6 °C (105 °F) on 30 July 2000. Winters average −4.2 °C (24 °F), and the lowest temperature recorded was −26.5 °C (−16 °F) on 6 February 1972. Precipitation levels are low and happen mainly in winter (mostly as snow), spring and autumn.

Climate data for Konya (1991–2020, extremes 1929–2023)
Month	Jan	Feb	Mar	Apr	May	Jun	Jul	Aug	Sep	Oct	Nov	Dec	Year
Record high °C (°F)	19.3 (66.7)	23.8 (74.8)	28.9 (84.0)	34.6 (94.3)	34.4 (93.9)	36.7 (98.1)	40.6 (105.1)	40.9 (105.6)	38.8 (101.8)	32.3 (90.1)	25.4 (77.7)	21.8 (71.2)	40.9 (105.6)
Mean daily maximum °C (°F)	4.6 (40.3)	6.9 (44.4)	12.5 (54.5)	17.6 (63.7)	22.8 (73.0)	27.4 (81.3)	31.0 (87.8)	30.9 (87.6)	26.7 (80.1)	20.4 (68.7)	12.7 (54.9)	6.3 (43.3)	18.3 (64.9)
Daily mean °C (°F)	−0.3 (31.5)	1.3 (34.3)	6.0 (42.8)	10.9 (51.6)	15.9 (60.6)	20.5 (68.9)	24.1 (75.4)	24.0 (75.2)	19.4 (66.9)	13.4 (56.1)	6.2 (43.2)	1.5 (34.7)	11.9 (53.4)
Mean daily minimum °C (°F)	−3.9 (25.0)	−3.3 (26.1)	0.2 (32.4)	4.4 (39.9)	9.0 (48.2)	13.6 (56.5)	17.1 (62.8)	17.2 (63.0)	12.3 (54.1)	7.0 (44.6)	0.8 (33.4)	−2.2 (28.0)	6.0 (42.8)
Record low °C (°F)	−28.2 (−18.8)	−26.5 (−15.7)	−16.4 (2.5)	−8.6 (16.5)	−1.2 (29.8)	1.8 (35.2)	6.0 (42.8)	5.3 (41.5)	−3.0 (26.6)	−8.4 (16.9)	−20.0 (−4.0)	−26.0 (−14.8)	−28.2 (−18.8)
Average precipitation mm (inches)	35.9 (1.41)	23.1 (0.91)	27.4 (1.08)	34.2 (1.35)	38.2 (1.50)	27.8 (1.09)	6.5 (0.26)	6.5 (0.26)	15.9 (0.63)	29.7 (1.17)	34.5 (1.36)	45.6 (1.80)	325.3 (12.81)
Average precipitation days	10.53	8.97	9.80	10.83	12.47	8.10	3.00	2.63	4.40	7.27	7.13	10.10	95.2
Average relative humidity (%)	79.8	73.3	63.4	58.7	56.1	47.5	38.9	39.4	44.2	57.6	70.1	79.9	59.0
Mean monthly sunshine hours	105.4	138.4	195.3	216.0	269.7	309.0	344.1	334.8	291.0	235.6	159.0	102.3	2,700.6
Mean daily sunshine hours	3.4	4.9	6.3	7.2	8.7	10.3	11.1	10.8	9.7	7.6	5.3	3.3	7.4
Source 1: Turkish State Meteorological Service
Source 2: NOAA (humidity)

== Culture ==
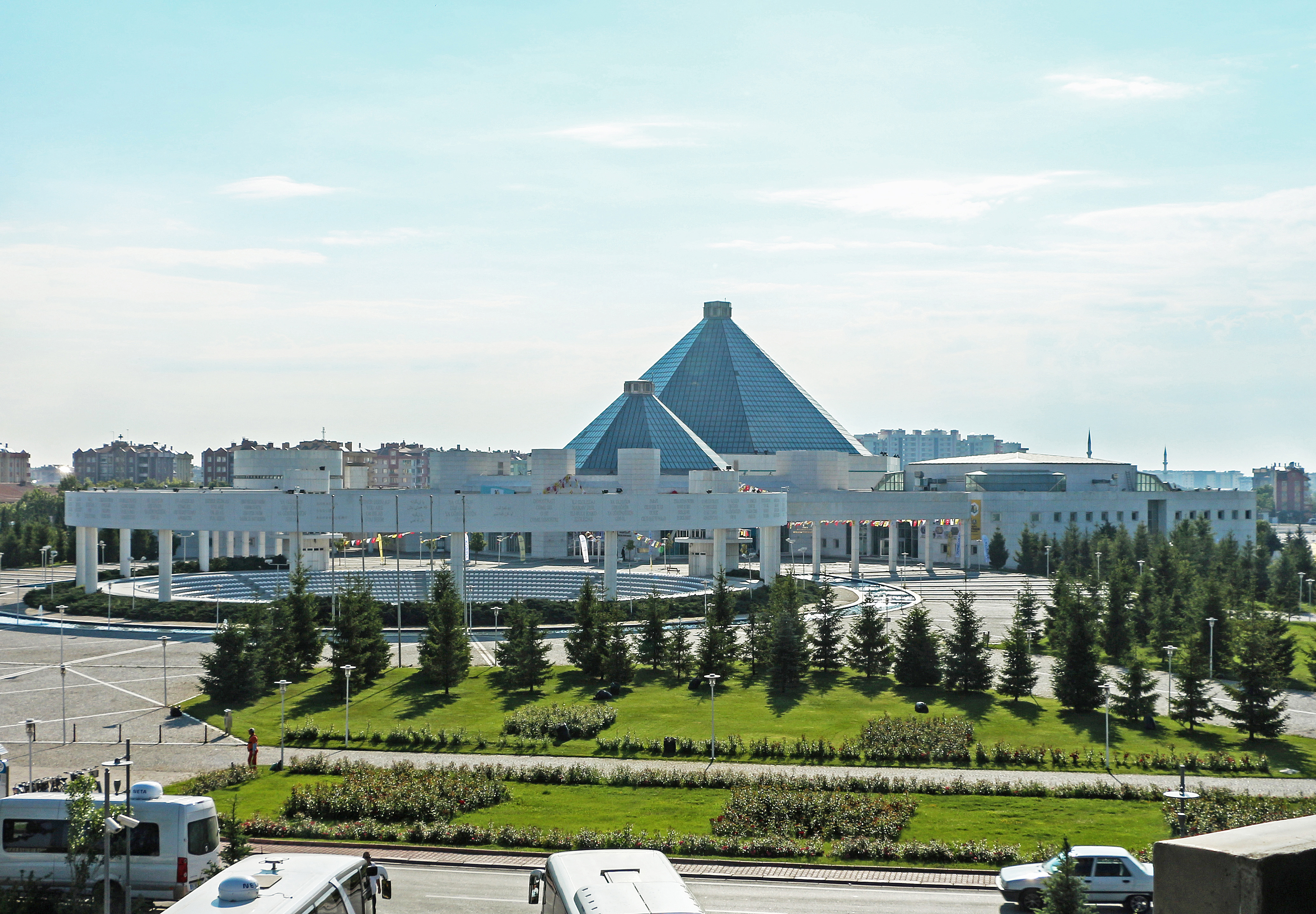
Mevlana Cultural Centre in Konya

Konya has a reputation for being one of the more religiously conservative cities in Turkey. It was the final home of Rumi (Mevlana), whose turquoise-domed tomb in the city is its primary tourist attraction. In 1273, Rumi's followers established the Mevlevi Sufi order of Islam and became known as the Whirling Dervishes. Every Saturday, there are Whirling Dervish performances (semas) at the Mevlana Cultural Centre. Unlike some of the commercial performances staged in cities like Istanbul, these are genuinely spiritual sessions.

Expensive, richly patterned Konya carpets were exported to Europe during the Renaissance and were draped over furniture to show off the wealth and status of their owners. They often crop up in contemporary oil paintings as symbols of the wealth of the painter's clients.

=== Attractions ===
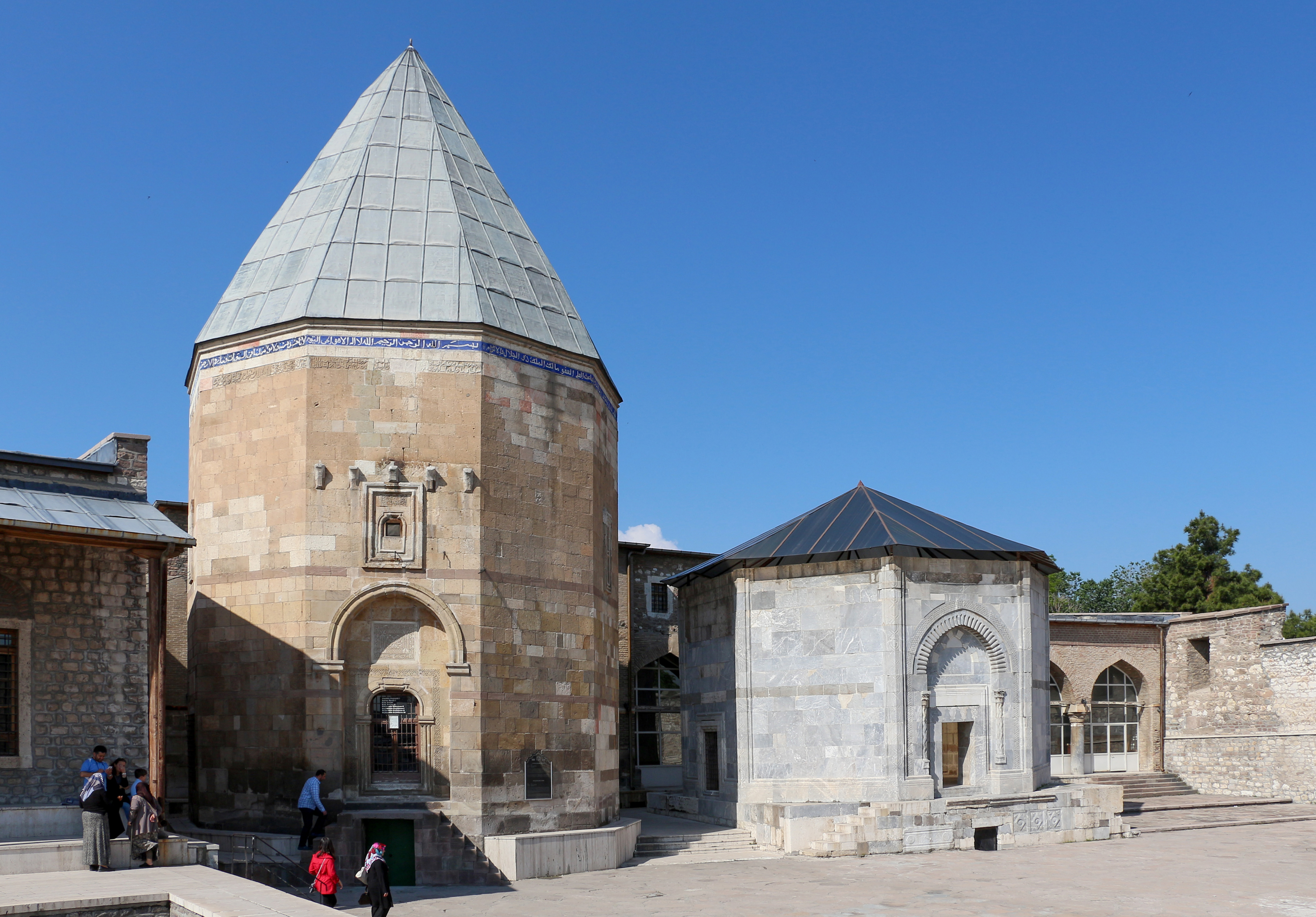
Alaaddin Mosque (1235) on Alaaddin Hill (Alaaddin Tepesi) in central Konya

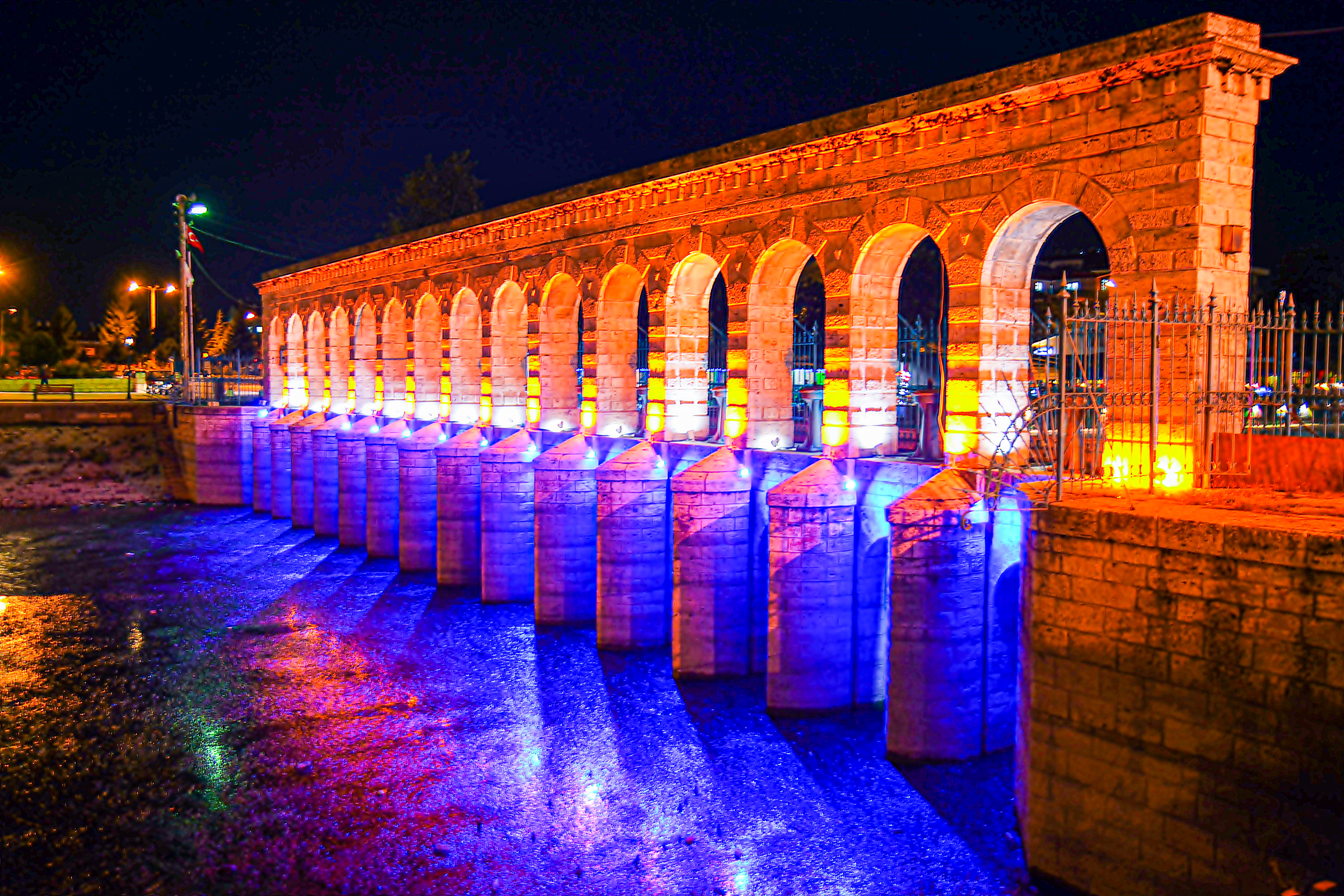
Taşköprü, Beyşehir

- Mevlâna Museum
- Alaaddin Mosque
- Ince Minaret Medrese—Museum
- Karatay Medrese—Museum
- Sırçalı Medrese
- Sahib-i Ata Mosque complex
- Konya Archaeological and Ethnography Museum
- Koyunoğlu Museum
- Atatürk House Museum
- Mevlana Cultural Centre
- Mevlana Festival
- Selimiye Mosque
- Aziziye Mosque
- Konya Science Centre (Turkish: Konya Bilim Merkezi)
- Konya Tropical Butterfly Garden
- Meram, suburb with popular waterside picnicking facilities
- Sille, 8 kilometres (5.0 miles) northwest from Mevlana Museum: antique village, mosques, churches, cave churches and catacombs
- Çatalhöyük

=== Food ===
One of the city's best-known dishes, etli ekmek consists of slices of lamb served on flaps of soft white bread. Konya is also known for unfeasibly long pides intended to be shared, and tirit, a traditional rice dish made from meat and assorted vegetables.

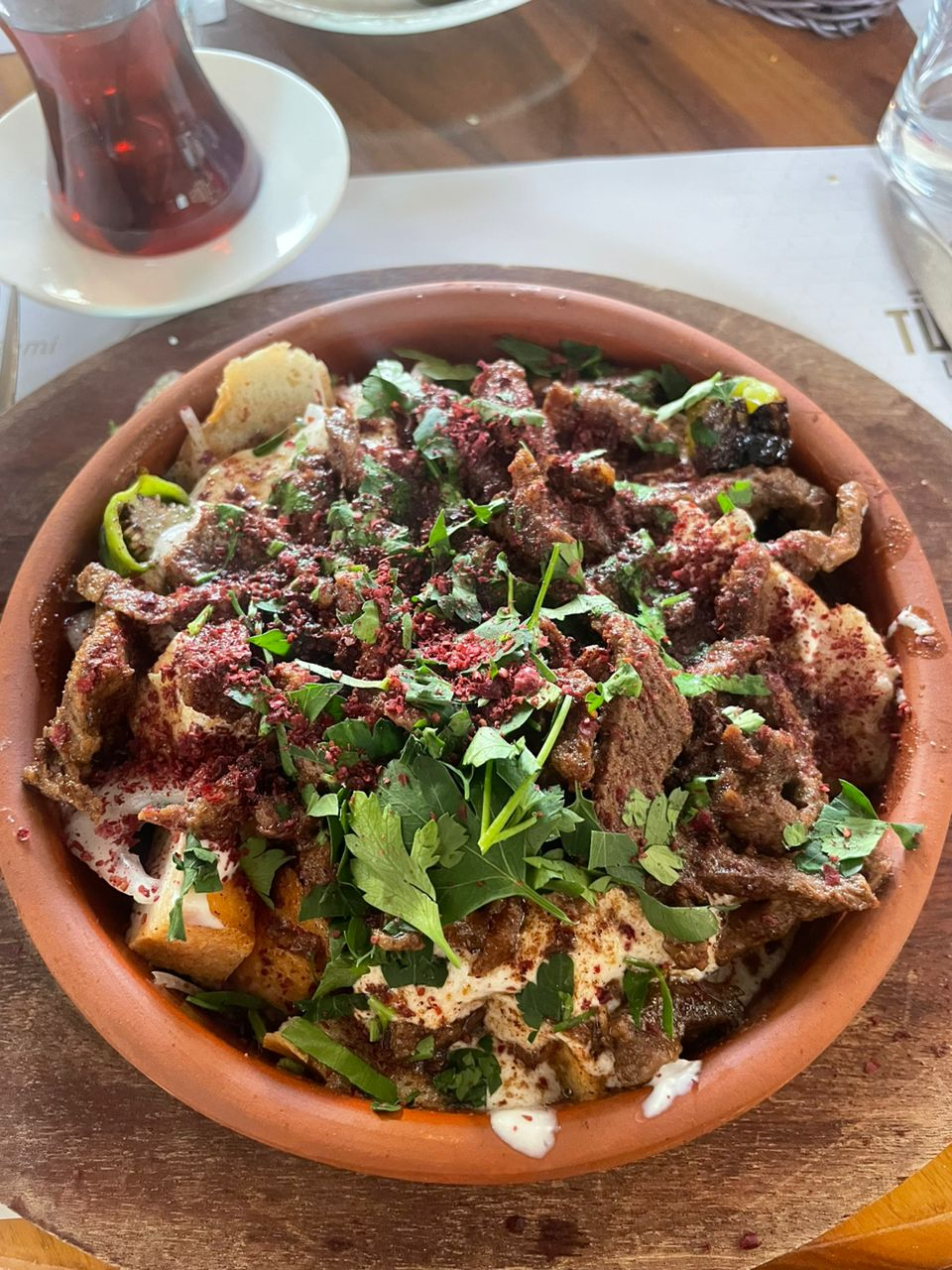
Tirit

Konya is also known for its sweets, including cezerye, an old Turkish sweet made from carrots, and pişmaniye, which is similar to American cotton candy.

== Sports ==
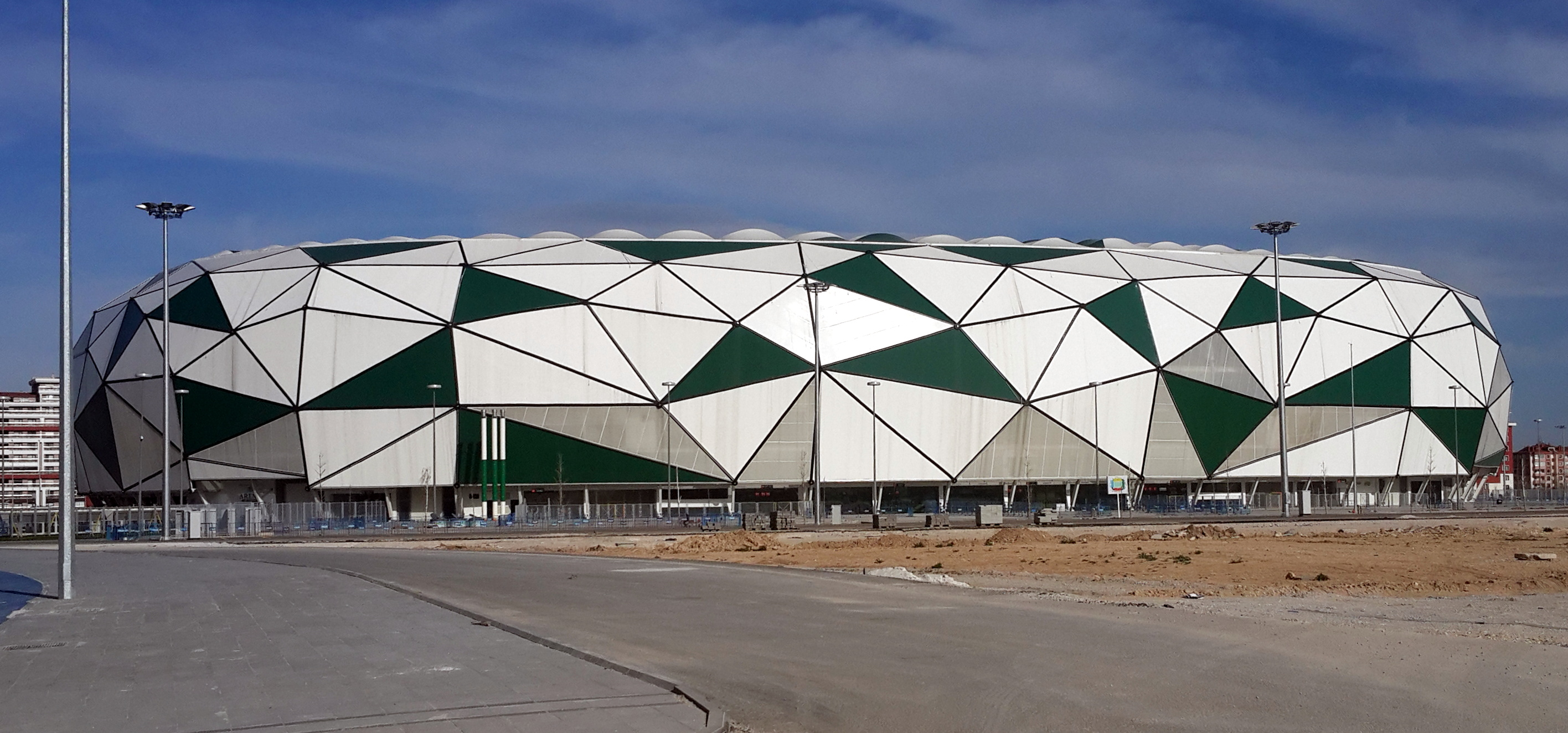
Konya Metropolitan Stadium in Konya

The city's football team Konyaspor is part of the Turkish Professional Football League. On May 31, 2017, they won their first national trophy, beating İstanbul Başakşehir to the Türkiye Kupası in a penalty shootout. They repeated this success on August 6, 2017, defeating Beşiktaş to win the Türkiye Süper Kupası (Turkish Super Bowl).

Konya Metropolitan Stadium (Konya Büyükşehir Stadyumu) is in the Selçuklu neighbourhood and can seat up to 42,000 spectators.

The city hosted the 2022 Islamic Solidarity Games in August 2022.

== Education ==
Founded in 1975, Selçuk University had the largest number of students (76,080) of any public university in Turkey during the 2008–09 academic year. The other public university, Necmettin Erbakan University, was established in Konya in 2010.

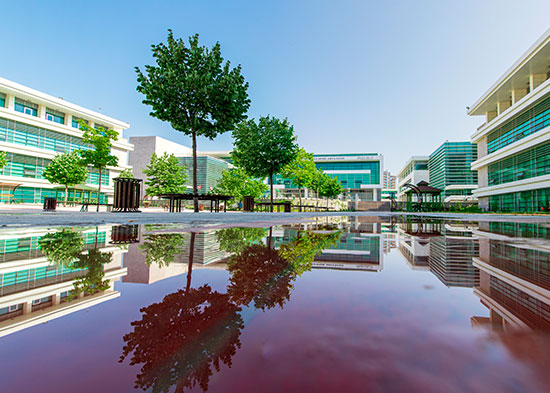
A view from KTO Karatay University

Private colleges in Konya include the KTO Karatay University.

Konya hosts the Anatolian Eagle Tactical Training Centre for training NATO Allies and friendly Air Forces.

== Transportation ==
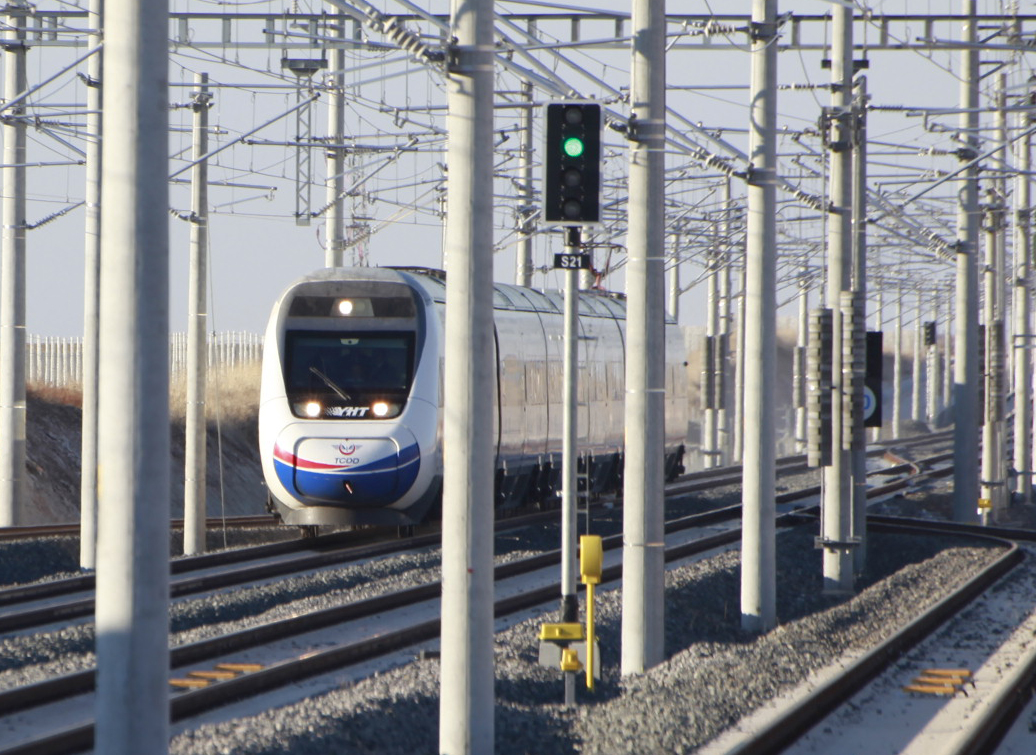
A TCDD HT65000 on the Ankara–Konya line of the Turkish State Railways

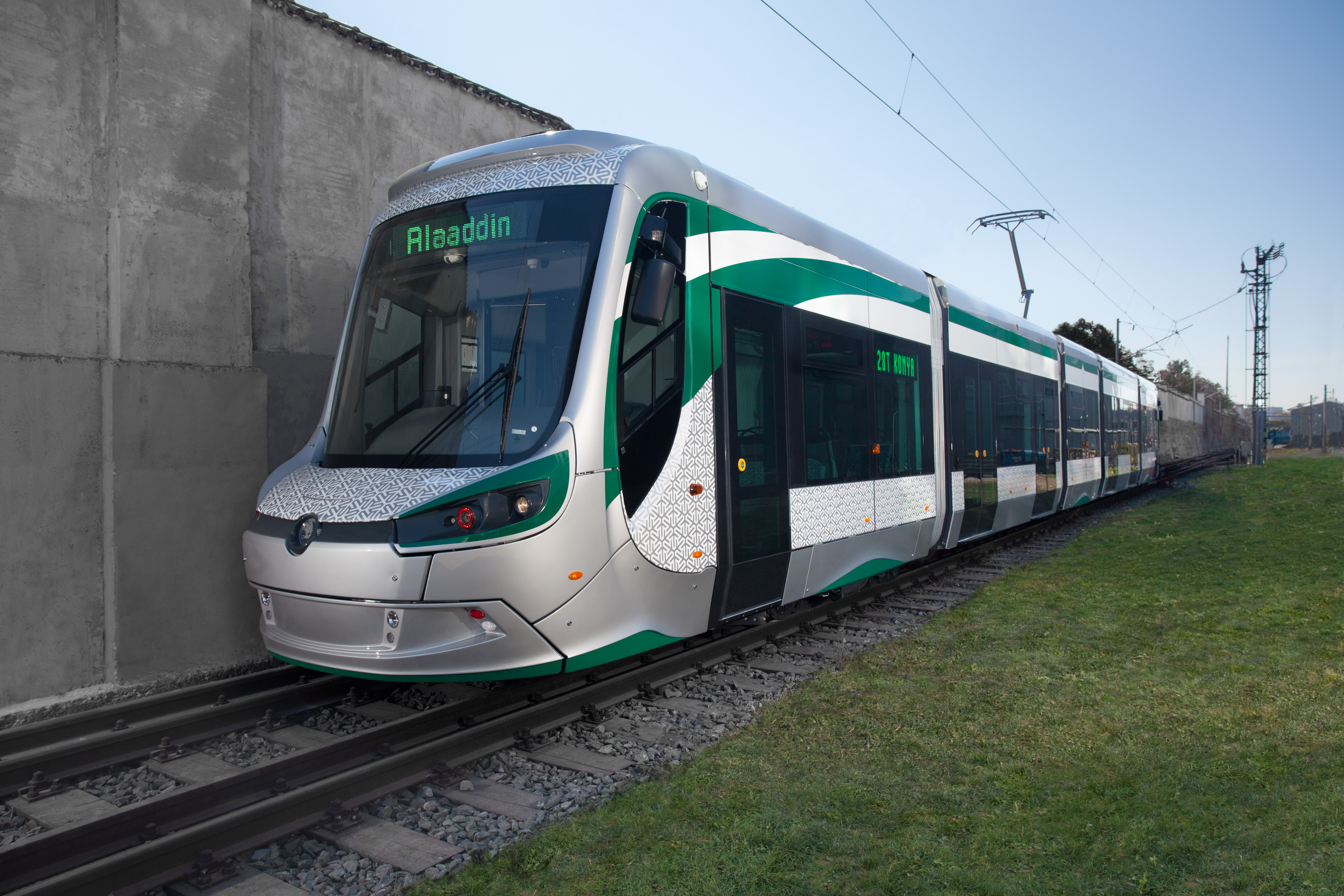
A Škoda 28 T tram produced for the upcoming Konya Metro

=== Intercity buses ===
The central bus station has connections to a range of destinations, including Istanbul, Ankara and İzmir. It is connected to the town centre by a tram.

=== Inner-city public transport ===
The Konya Tram network is 41 km (25 mi) long and has two lines with 41 stations. Opened in 1992, it was expanded in 1996 and 2015. The Konya Tram uses Škoda 28 T vehicles.

Work began on building a Konya Metro in 2020. The system will have 22 stations.

Konya also has an extensive inner-city bus network.

=== Railway ===
Konya is connected to Ankara, Eskişehir, Istanbul and Karaman via the high-speed railway services of the Turkish State Railways.

=== Airport and airbase ===
Konya Airport (KYA) is a public airport but also a military airbase used by NATO. The Third Air Wing (Note: Ana Jet Üssü or AJÜ) of the 1st Air Force Command (Note: Hava Kuvvet Komutanlığı) is based at the Konya Air Base. The wing controls the four Boeing 737 AEW&C Peace Eagle aircraft of the Turkish Air Force.

== Notable people ==
- Thecla, early Christian Saint
- Chariton the Confessor, early Christian monk and Saint
- Amphilochius of Iconium, fourth century Christian bishop.
- Jalal al-Din Muhammad Rumi, Sufi mystic, poet, and founder of the Mevlevi Order.
- Prokopios Lazaridis, Greek Orthodox Metropolitan of Iconium and martyr
- Louisette Texier, Armenian genocide survivor, French Resistance member and racecar driver
- Murat Yıldırım, actor and presenter
- Nevin Halıcı, writer, cultural anthropologist and lecturer
- Hilmi Şenalp (1957-), architect.
- Kemal Şahin, Turkish–German entrepreneur
- Metin Şahin, taekwondo practitioner
- Saliha Scheinhardt, writer and lecturer.
- Husam al-Din Chalabi, muslim Sufi
- İsmail Güzel, wrestler
- Nur Banu Özpak, sport shooter
- Hazal Kaya, actress
- Selin Ciğerci, social media influencer and businesswoman

== Twin towns – sister cities ==
Konya is twinned with:

- Khoy, Iran
- Bârlad, Romania
- Ganja, Azerbaijan
- Nishapur, Iran
- Al Qadarif, Sudan
- Berlin, Germany
- Sheki, Azerbaijan
- Sylhet, Bangladesh
- Multan, Pakistan
- Kyoto, Japan
- Tetovo, North Macedonia
- Xi'an, China
- Ráckeve, Hungary
- Kirkuk, Iraq

== See also ==
- Mevlâna Museum
- Anatolian Tigers
- Konya Carpets and Rugs
- Theodosius the Cenobiarch (c. 423–529 AD), monk, abbot, and saint born in Iconium; a founder and organiser of the cenobitic way of monastic life
- Thecla or Tecla, first-century virgin saint of the early Christian Church, born in Iconium
