= Louisette Texier =

French resistant and racecar driver (1913–2021)

- Born: Arpine Hovanessian; 18 February 1913; Konya, Ottoman Empire
- Died: 20 July 2021 (aged 108); La Romieu, France
- Occupations: Resistant; Racecar driver

Louisette Texier, born Arpine Hovanessian (Armenian: Արփինե Հովհաննիսեան; 18 February 1913 – 20 July 2021) was a French resistant and racecar driver. She was one of the last remaining survivors of the Armenian genocide.

== Biography ==
Hovanessian was born into an Armenian family in the Ottoman Empire. Her father was assassinated in 1915 during the Armenian genocide and she was saved by her mother and placed in an orphanage in Istanbul. The orphanage moved to Thessaloniki in 1922, and to Marseille in 1924. In 1928, she began attending the École Tebrotzassère in Le Raincy, where she was classmates with Mélinée Manouchian. She was not reunited with her mother until adulthood.

Texier left boarding school at the age of 15 "to become a dancer in Parisian cabarets and live without constraint". She participated in the French Resistance during World War II, evidenced by her French Forces of the Interior card, and helped to hide a Jewish family. In 1956, she opened a clothing store in Neuilly-sur-Seine.

Texier was passionate about cars and motorsports. She partook in professional competitions from 1956 to 1964, such as the Monte Carlo Rally and the Tour de France Automobile. She ranked 2nd in the 1963 competition, driving a Jaguar Mark 2. She was selected for the "Daring Armenian Women" project, which covered distinguished women of Armenian origin.

Texier died in La Romieu on 20 July 2021 at the age of 108. Her funeral was held at the Chapelle Saint-Gény de Lectoure.
