= Aziziye Mosque, Konya =

Masjid in Konya, Turkey

Aziziye Mosque
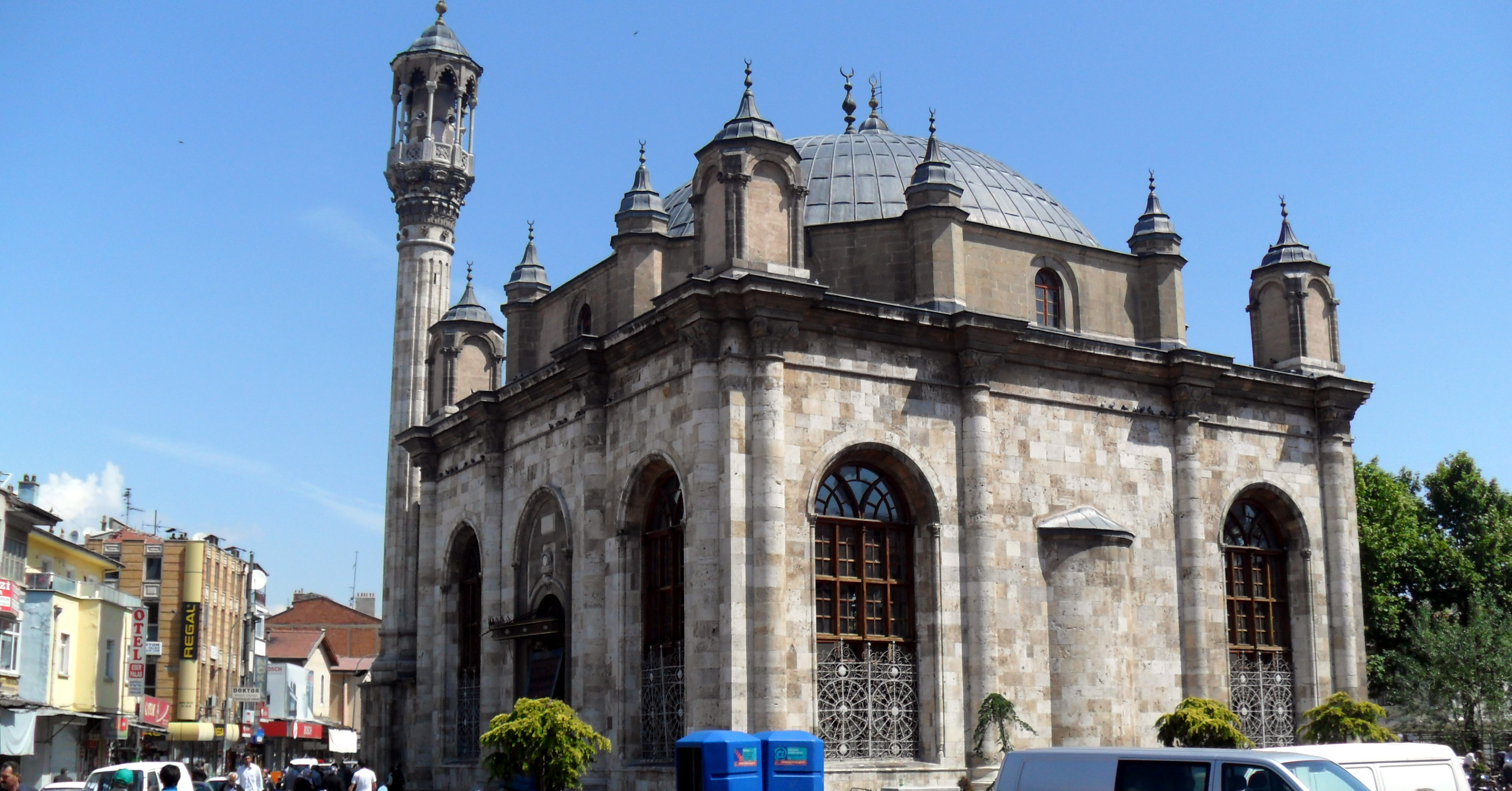

Religion
- Affiliation: Islam
- Province: Konya Province
- Region: Central Anatolia
- Rite: Sunni Islam
- Status: Active

Location
- Location: Konya, Turkey
- Interactive map of Aziziye Mosque

Architecture
- Type: Mosque
- Style: Ottoman (19th-century eclectic)
- Groundbreaking: 1872
- Completed: 1874
- Minaret: 2

The Aziziye Mosque (Turkish: Aziziye Camii) is an Ottoman mosque in Konya, Turkey. It is well known for the columned balcony of its minaret, an architectural feature rarely seen in Turkish mosques.

== Location ==
The Mosque is in the ilçe (district) of Karatay of Greater Konya at about 37°52′11.8″N 32°30′02.8″E. It is situated in the business center of the city.

== History ==
The original Mosque had been commissioned between 1671 and 1676 by Damat Mustafa Pasha who was the husband of Hatice Sultan, the daughter of sultan Mehmet IV. But when it was ruined as a result of a fire in 1867, it was recommissioned by Pertevniyal, the mother of sultan Abdülaziz in 1874. (Name Aziziye refers to Abdülaziz)

== Architecture ==
The mosque was built in the eclectic style of Ottoman architecture that prevailed under the tenure of the Balian architects in the mid-19th century, blending Empire and Neoclassical forms with traditional Ottoman mosque design. It has many features which make it one of a kind. It is a double minaret building. In each minaret the şerefe (balcony) roof is supported with columns which makes the mosque unique in Turkey. Unlike most other mosques its main floor is elevated and stairs are used to reach the main floor. Also the floorspace is not wide and there is no yard. Because of the same reason Sadirvans (şadırvan, water fountains), are adjacent to minarets. The praying hall is square shaped and its ceiling is a big dome. The narthex has three smaller domes on six marble pillars. Another interesting feature of the Mosque is its windows which are wider than the doors.

== Building material ==
The main building material is cut stone. Bluish marble has been used in the construction of the mihrab and the minbar.

== Gallery ==
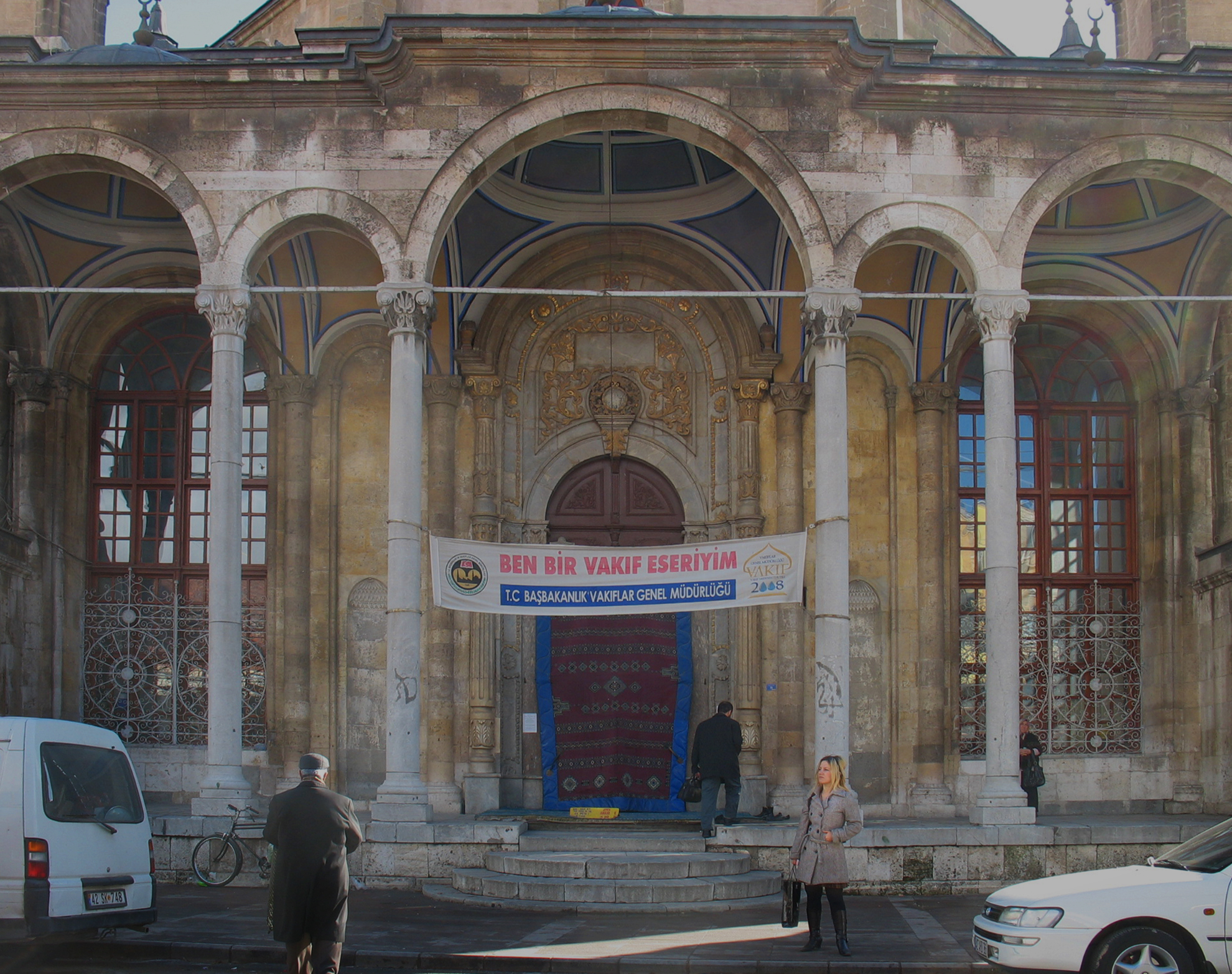
Entrance

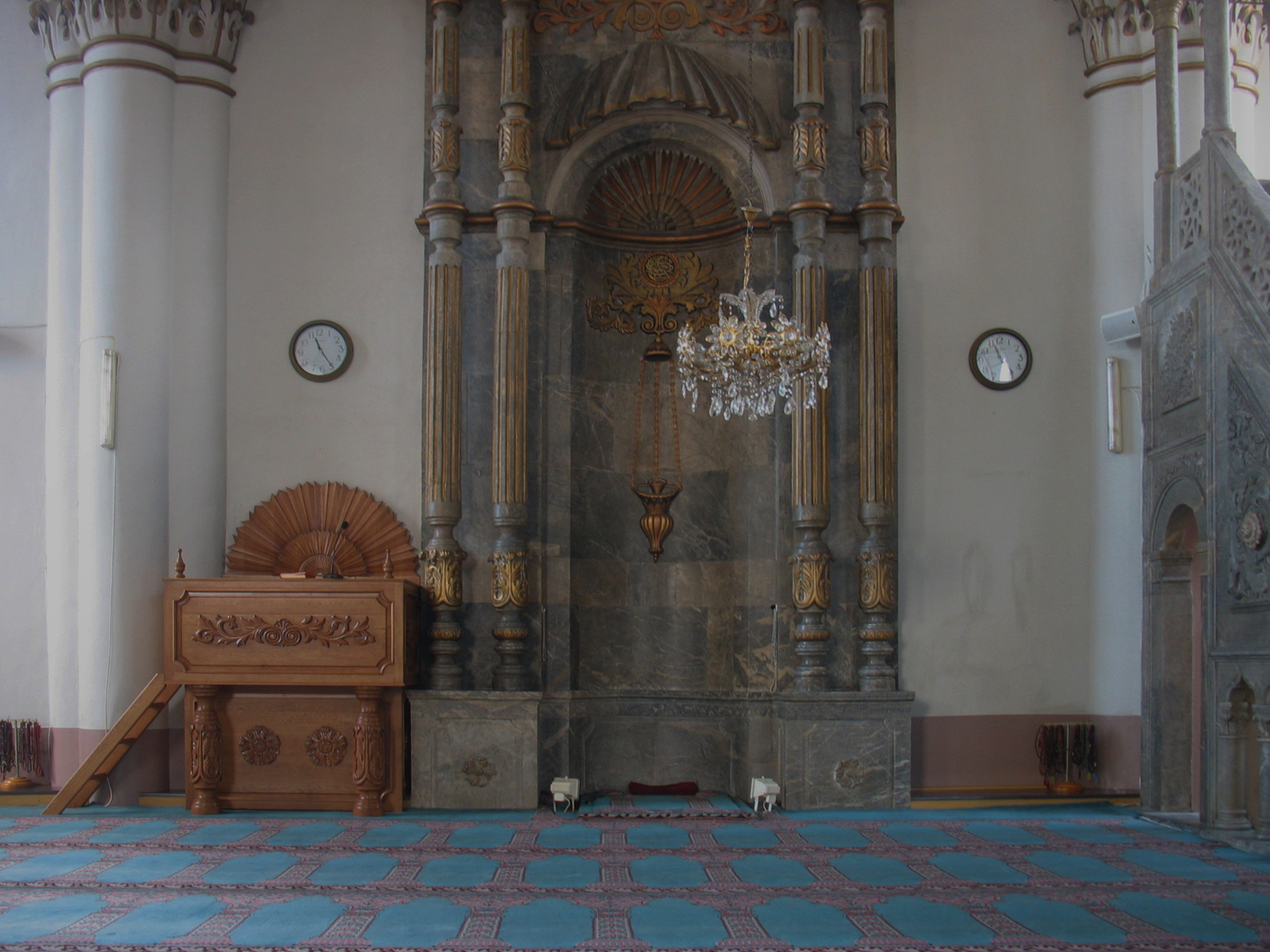
Mihrab

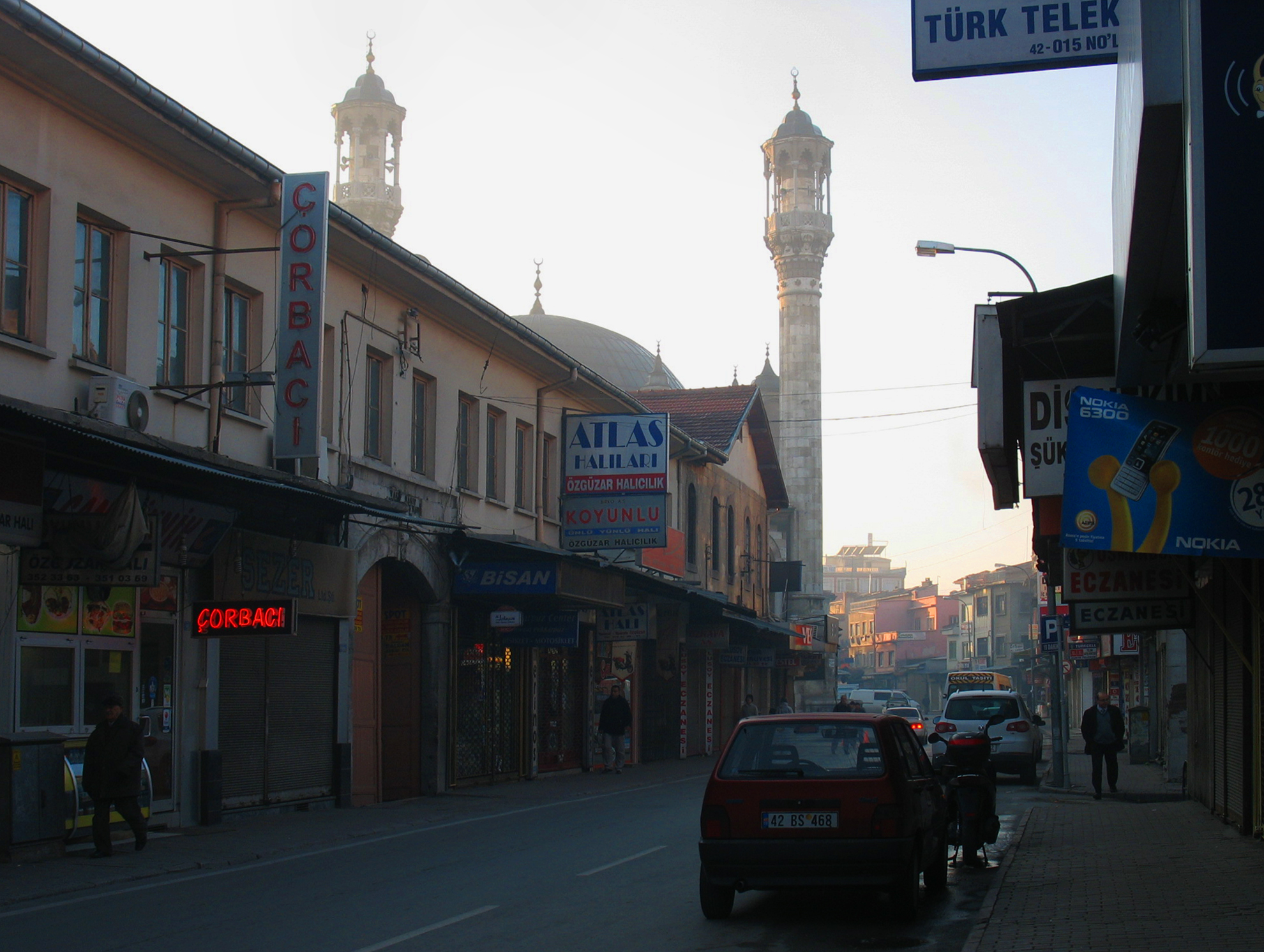
Street scene

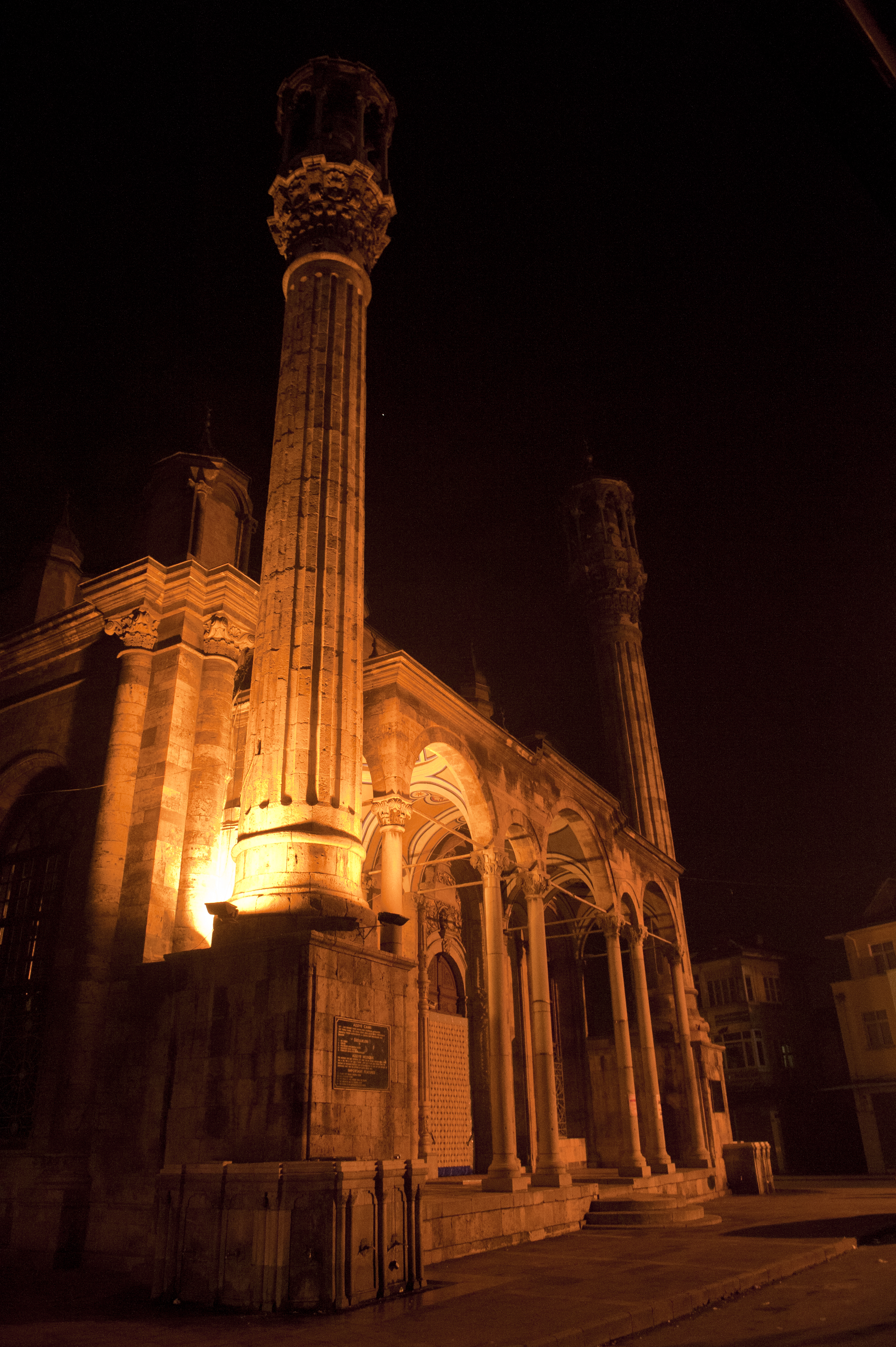
Konya Aziziye Mosque Evening view

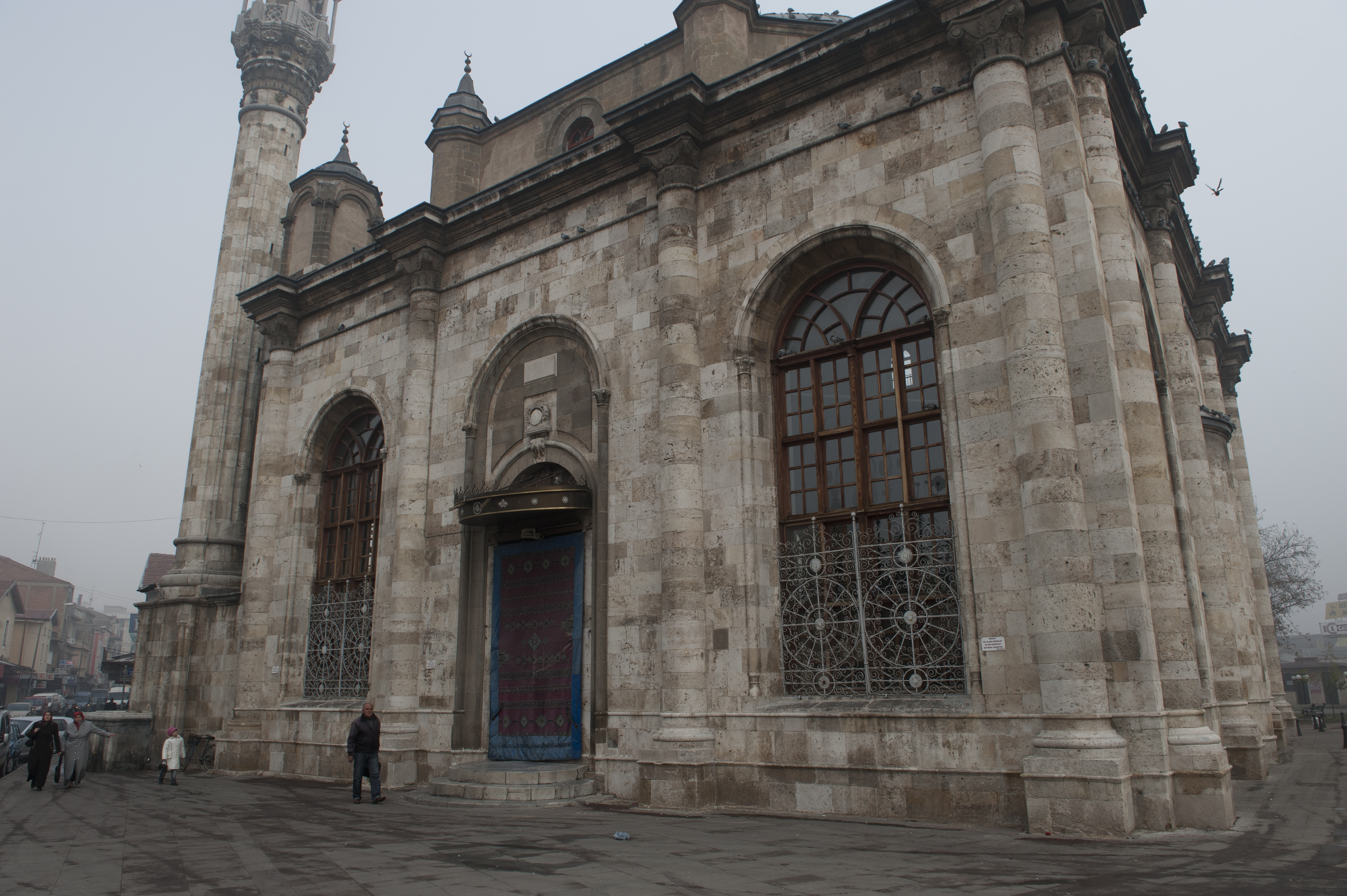
Konya Aziziye Mosque Exterior

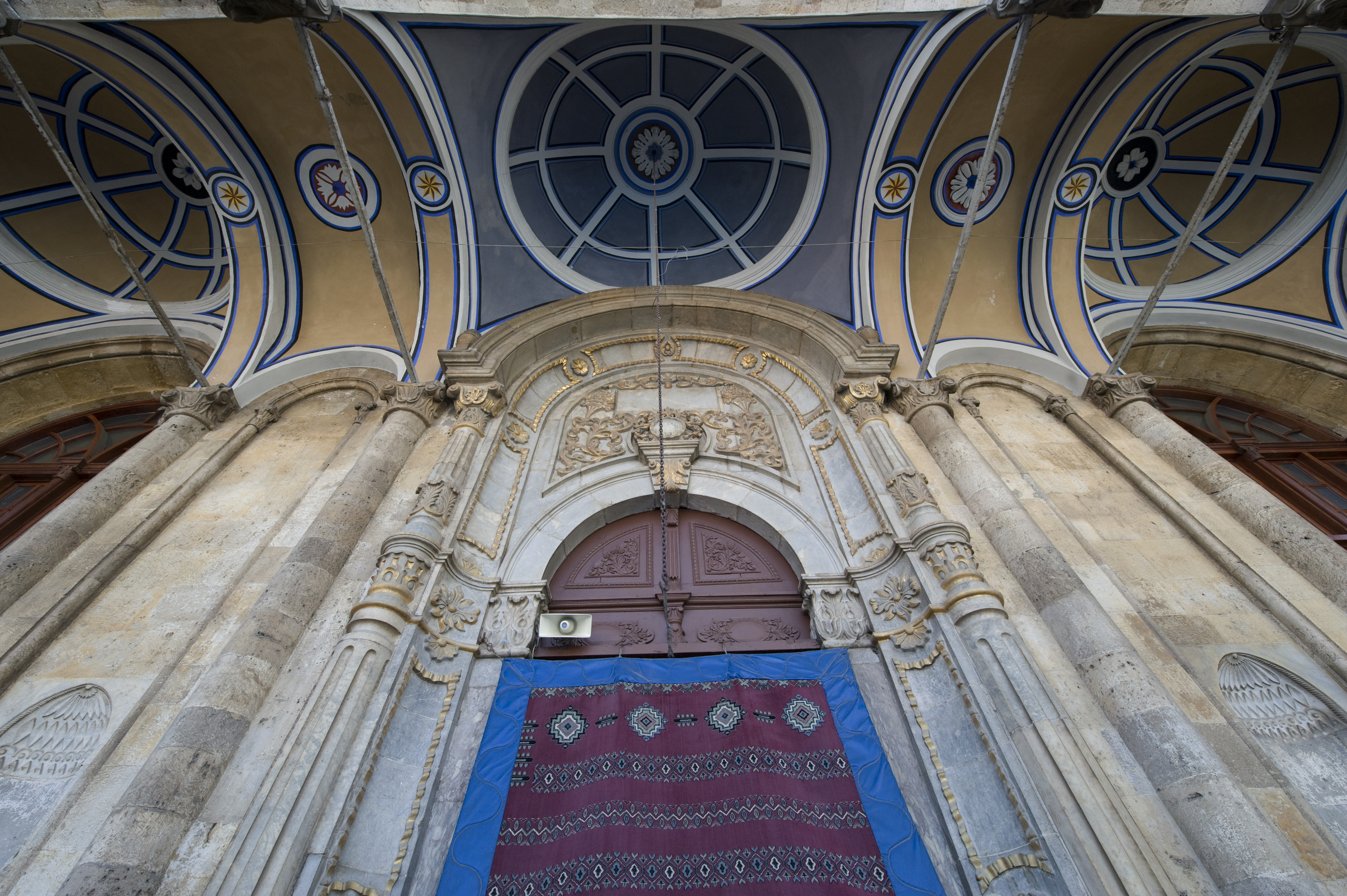
Konya Aziziye Mosque Son Cemaat yeri

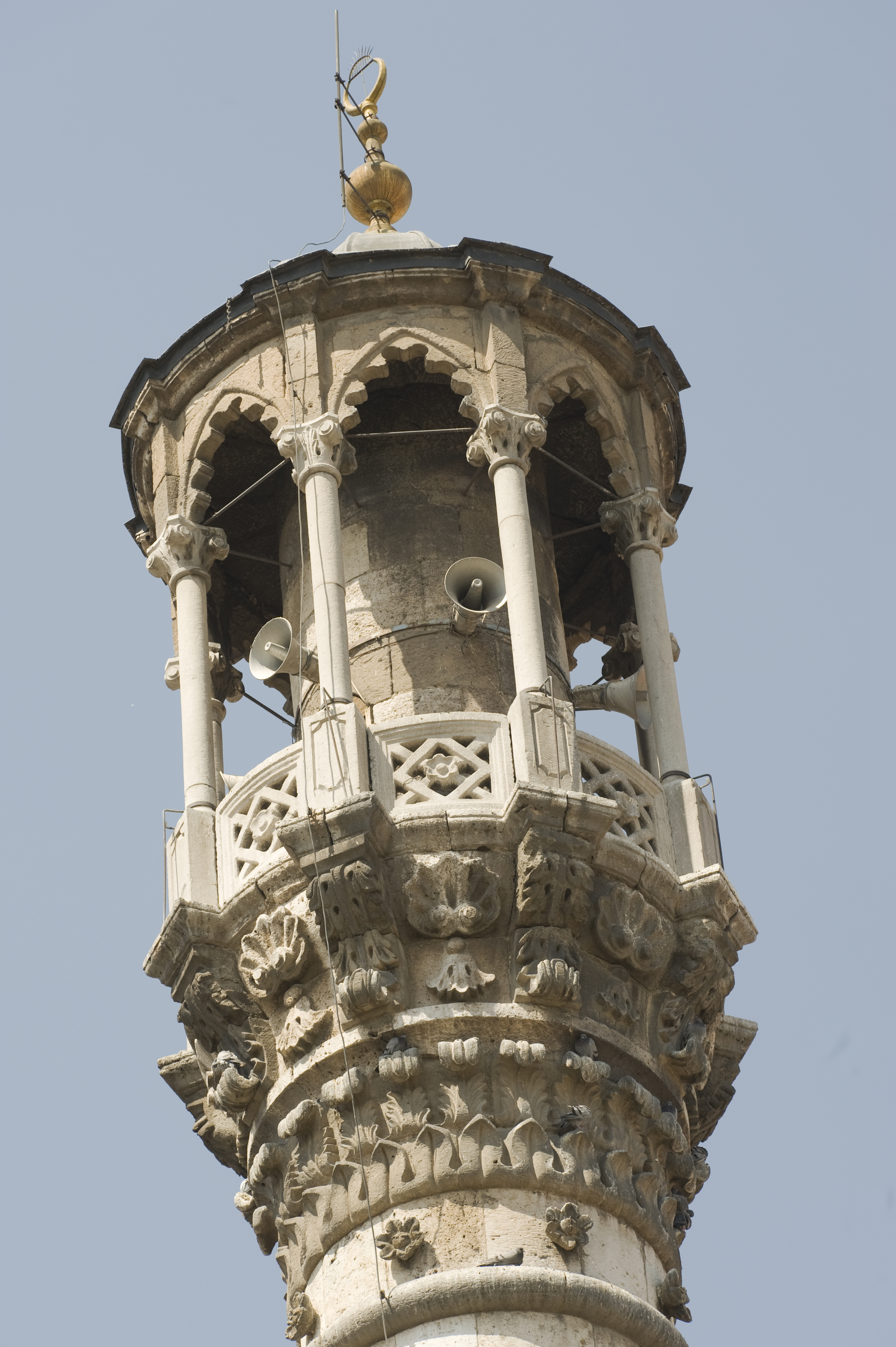
Konya Aziziye Mosque şerefe

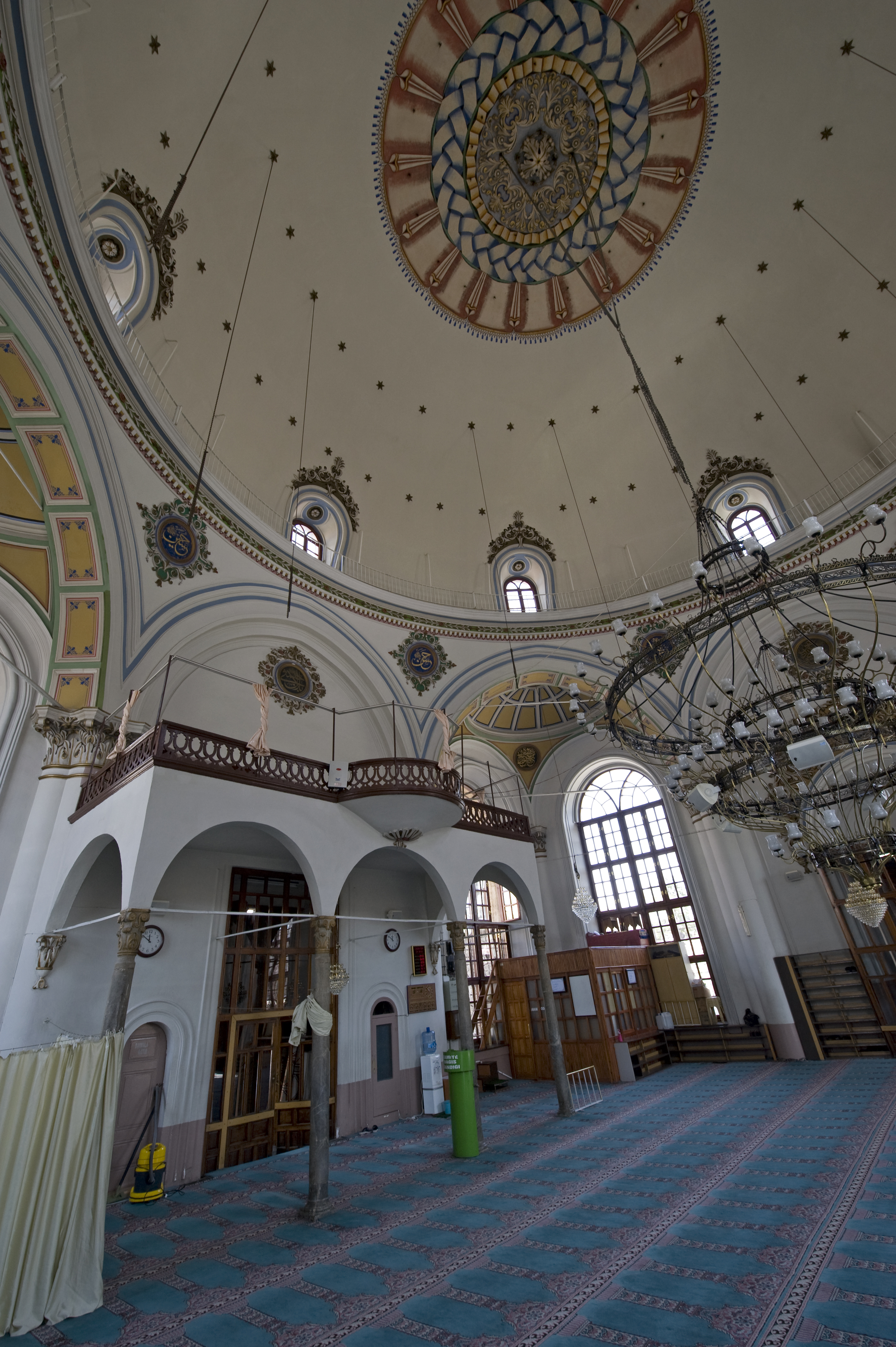
Konya Aziziye Mosque Interior
