= Konya carpets =

Type of Anatolian carpet

In 1292, Marco Polo was the first to make mention of the Konya carpets in writing when he called them the most beautiful in the world. Konya carpets are named for the region in which they were made. Renamed from the Greek “Iconium” when the Seljuk Sultans of Rum made it their capital, Konya is one of the largest, oldest and continuously occupied cities in Asia Minor.

== Background ==
When Polo wrote of the Konyas, he had probably seen them in manufactories that were attached to the Seljuk courts. In the early 20th century, large carpets were found in the Alaadin Mosque in Konya; they are now housed in the Turkish and Islamic Arts Museum in Istanbul. Scholars and collectors alike, primarily for their bold tribal designs and magnificent color combinations not to mention their rarity, covet Konya rugs.

== Classification ==
Konya rugs being made today include those coming from surrounding regions: Kecimuhsine, Karapinar, Obruk and Taspinar. All of these regions are included in "Greater Konya", although distinctions can be made between types. Nomadic rugs falling under the Konya region are also known as Yörüks. In a sense Konyas are the Turkish counterparts to Caucasian Kazaks, though they are generally older and far rarer, and are no less sought after by collectors.

== Wool ==
Konya rugs are prized for their luxurious wool, which comes from the rural areas surrounding the city. The wool from these regions is known to be some of the richest worldwide.

== Colors ==
Older pieces are characterized by the restraint towards color combinations and their use of earth tones (most notably: soft yellow, terracotta and browns). The wefts of the Konya rugs are always red, distinguishing them from other Persian carpets. The Nomadic pieces within this genre usually have a foundation of dark wool or goat hair.

== Design and structure ==
Incorporated within Konya carpets are hexagonal and basic figures. These patterns are tribal motifs. Geometries are either arranged in neat rows or staggered throughout the field. A common geometric motif is the "Memling gul", a geometric medallion patterned throughout the carpet. These rugs also feature a fairly loose knotting technique.

== See also ==
- Yomut carpet – Type of Turkmen rug
- Turkish carpet
