= Konya Tropical Butterfly Garden =

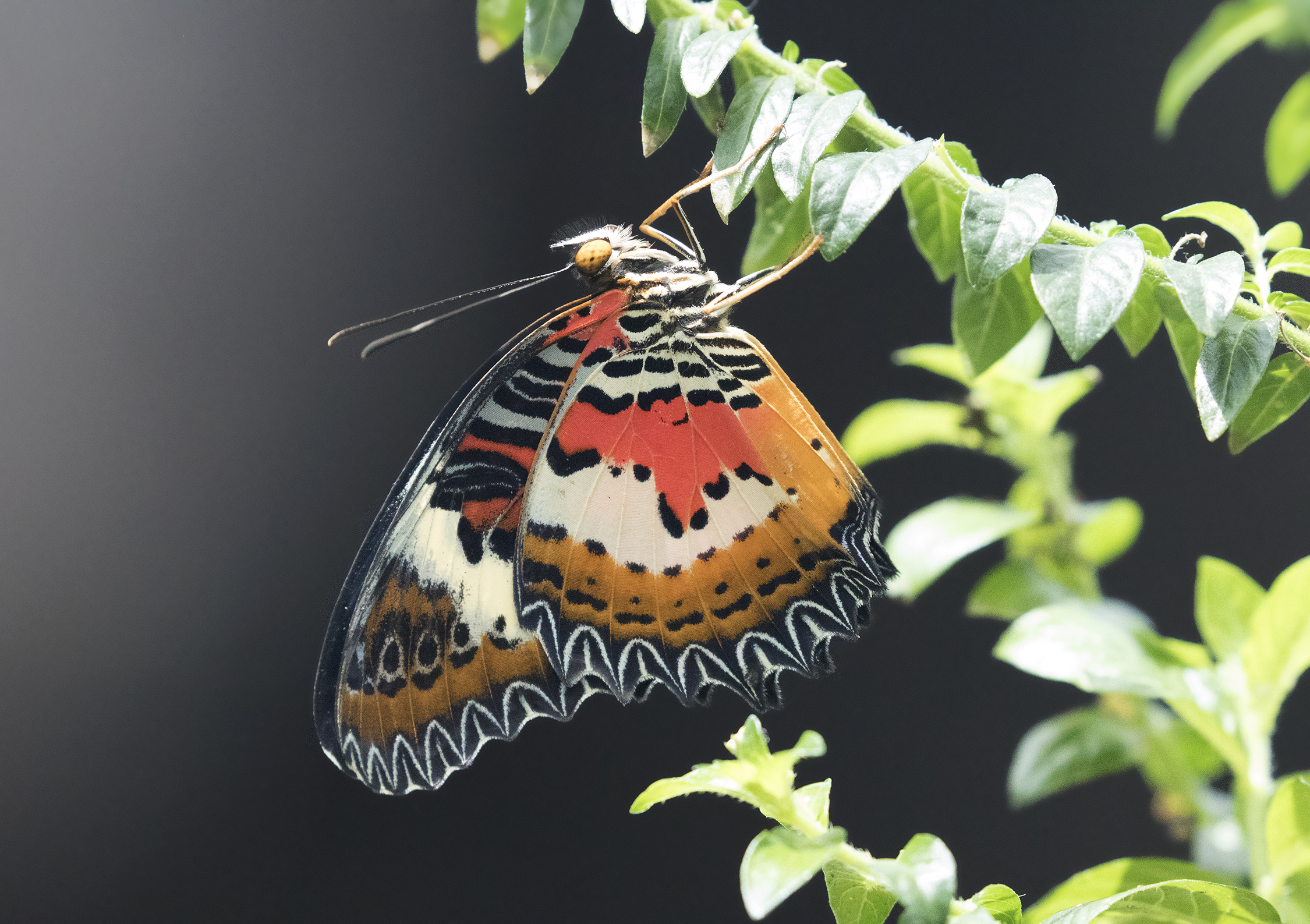
- A male leopard lacewing (Cethosia cyane) butterfly. Konya Tropical Butterfly Garden, Turkey
- Interactive map of Konya Tropical Butterfly Garden
- 37°56′55″N 32°27′43″E
- Date opened: July 4, 2015; 10 years ago
- Location: Selçuklu, Konya Province, Turkey
- Land area: 7,600 m^{2} (82,000 sq ft)
- No. of animals: Thousands
- No. of species: Up to 45
- Annual visitors: 350,000 (average)
- Major exhibits: Tropical butterflies, plants
- Owner: Municipality of Selçuklu
- Public transit: City bus line #47
- Website: www.konyatropikalkelebekbahcesi.com

Konya Tropical Butterfly Garden (Turkish: Konya Tropikal Kelebek Bahçesi), opened in 2015, is a butterfly house located in Selçuklu district of Konya Province, central Turkey.

== History and design ==
The butterfly house was built by the Municipality of Selçuklu next to the Selçuklu Flower Garden (Selçuklu Çiçek Bahçesi) and the Adventure Tower (Macera Kulesi) inside the Butterfly Valley Park (Kelebekler Vadisi Parkı), one of the biggest urban parks in Selçuklu. It was opened on 4 July 2015.

The London-based multinational architecture and engineering company Arup provided architectural design for the construction of the butterfly house. The building, which is designed in the form of a butterfly and covered with a glass roof, won the prestigious Turkish Best Architectural Design award in the Public Buildings category of 2018 Sign of the City. It covers 7,600 m^{2} (82,000 sq ft) including walking areas of 3,500 m^{2} (38,000 sq ft).

== Environmental aspects ==
It is the first butterfly sanctuary in the country, and has a butterfly flight area of 1,200 m^{2} (13,000 sq ft). (Note: As Konya Province is located in the part of Turkey that is in the Asian continent, the statement by a number of websites that this is the largest butterfly flight area in Europe seems to be a non sequitur.) It is kept at a constant temperature of 26 °C (79 °F) and 80% humidity all year long in a city with a cold semi-arid climate. The environment provides habitat for more than 20,000 tropical plants of more than 150 species and thousands of tropical butterflies from rainforest habitats belonging to up to 45 species. All the life cycle of the butterflies from the caterpillar larva, to pupa and finally to adult stage can be observed.

A team consisting of a tropical plant expert and six horticulturists deals with the cultivation of the tropical vegetation in the greenhouse, which satisfy the vital needs of the butterflies. For the care of the plants, natural or traditional methods are applied to control harmful organisms since the use of pesticides is a threat to the butterflies. Other staff of biologists and veterinary physicians work for the care and protection of the butterfly house.

The facility also features a Butterfly Museum, an Insect Museum and a Nature Education Class. The butterfly house also hosts scientific activities for students on fungi, birds, insects, and upon special request on reptiles and other interesting creatures.

== Status ==
The butterfly house is open to the public from 9:00 to 17:00 local time, but is closed on Mondays. It is served by city bus line #47. The butterfly house attracts an average of about 350,000 tourists a year. As of early November 2018, the number of visitors had exceeded 1.5 million since its opening.

== See also ==
- List of butterflies of Turkey
