= AKDAS Alcor =

Alcor
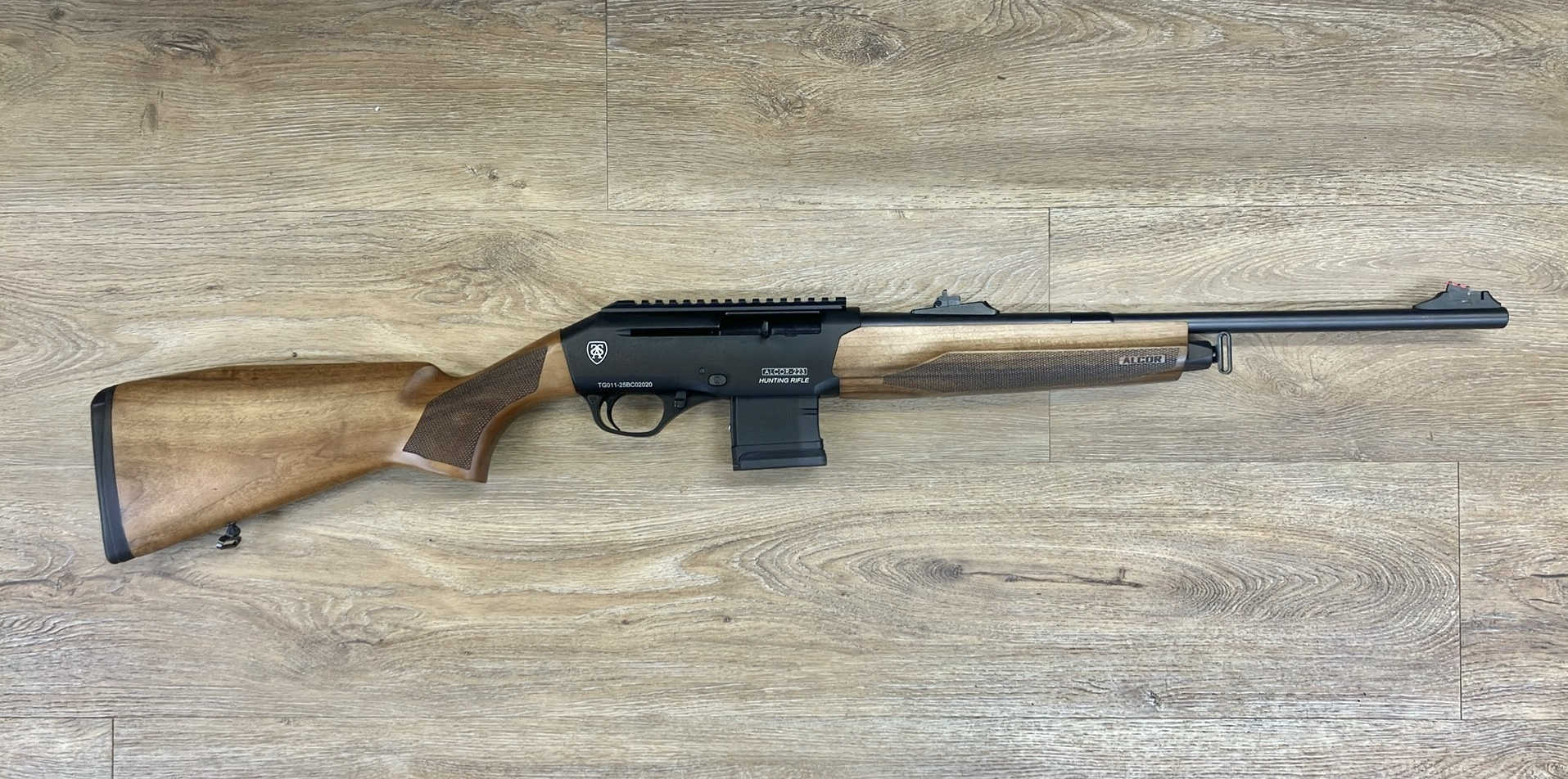
- Akdaş Alcor
- Type: Push Button Rifle Semi-automatic
- Place of origin: Turkey

Production history
- Manufacturer: Akdas Silah A.Ş.
- Produced: 2024–present
- Variants: SA223 (semi-automatic); PB223 (Push Button)

Specifications
- Mass: 3.2 kg
- Length: 1010 mm
- Barrel length: 470 mm
- Cartridge: .223 Remington
- Action: Straight Blowback, Push-Button (Australia)
- Feed system: 5-, 10-, 20-, or 30-round box magazine

The Akdaş Alcor is a Turkish-made gas-operated semi-automatic rifle manufactured by Akdas Silah A.Ş. in Beyşehir, Turkey. The Akdaş Alcor is designed as a traditional hunting rifle, as reflected by the "hunting rifle" marking on the receiver, and is a gas-operated, semi-automatic .223 Remington platform with AR-pattern magazine compatibility and a monolithic top rail for optics.

The rifle was introduced to Australia as the BP223 (push-button version) in late 2024 while the SA223 (semi-automatic version) was soon made available to Canada in early 2025.

== Availability ==
=== Australia ===
The Akdas Alcor PB223 ("push-button") rifle was introduced into the Australian market in October 2024, with the first shipment arriving and going on sale to dealers and the public in November 2024. The rifle has generated significant interest as one of the first affordable, gas-operated, self-ejecting centre-fire firearms tailored for the Australian market's specific legal requirements. It is classified as a Category B firearm in most states except Western Australia and Tasmania, with state-specific chassis available for compliance with appearance laws (e.g., NSW-compliant chassis).

=== Canada ===
The Akdas Alcor SA223 ("semi-automatic") rifle was introduced into the Canadian market in early 2025. It has been reviewed by the Canadian Firearms Program and classified as non-restricted, making it a legal option for licensed Canadian hunters and sport shooters. The Alcor has been well received by some in the Canadian shooting community as a desirable non-restricted semi-automatic rifle option, especially in the context of Canada's evolving firearms regulations since the 2020 Nova Scotia attacks.

== See also ==
- Ruger Mini-14
