= Eşrefoğlu Mosque =

13th-century Seljuk-era mosque in Konya Province, Turkey

Coordinates: 37.6832°N 31.7197°E

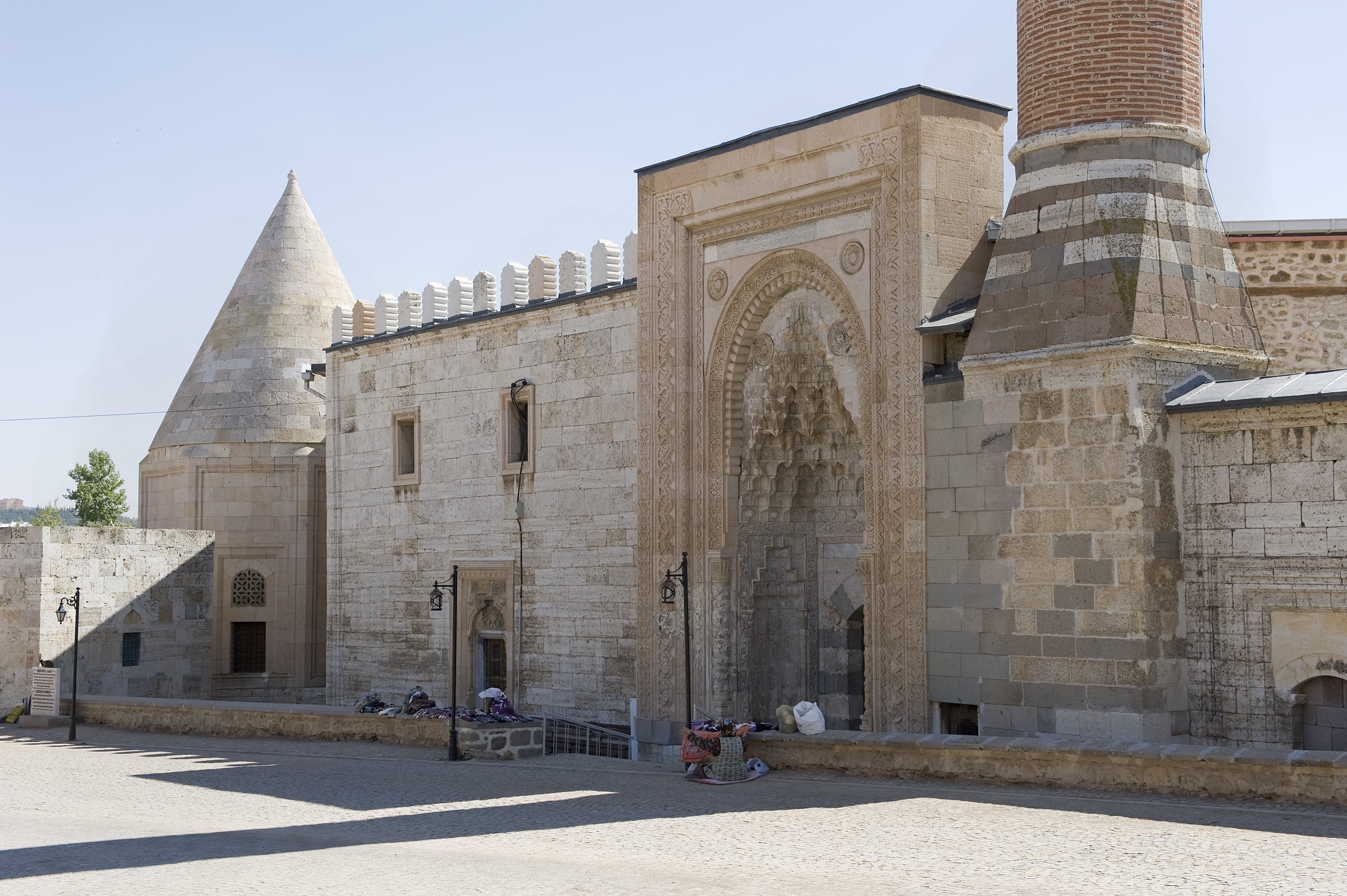

Religion
- Affiliation: Islam

Location
- Location: Beyşehir, Turkey
- Interactive map of Eşrefoğlu Mosque

Architecture
- Type: Mosque
- Style: Seljuk
- Groundbreaking: 1296
- Completed: 1299
- UNESCO World Heritage Site
- Type: Cultural
- Criteria: ii, iv
- Designated: 2023
- Parent listing: Wooden Hypostyle Mosques of Medieval Anatolia
- Reference no.: 1694-005

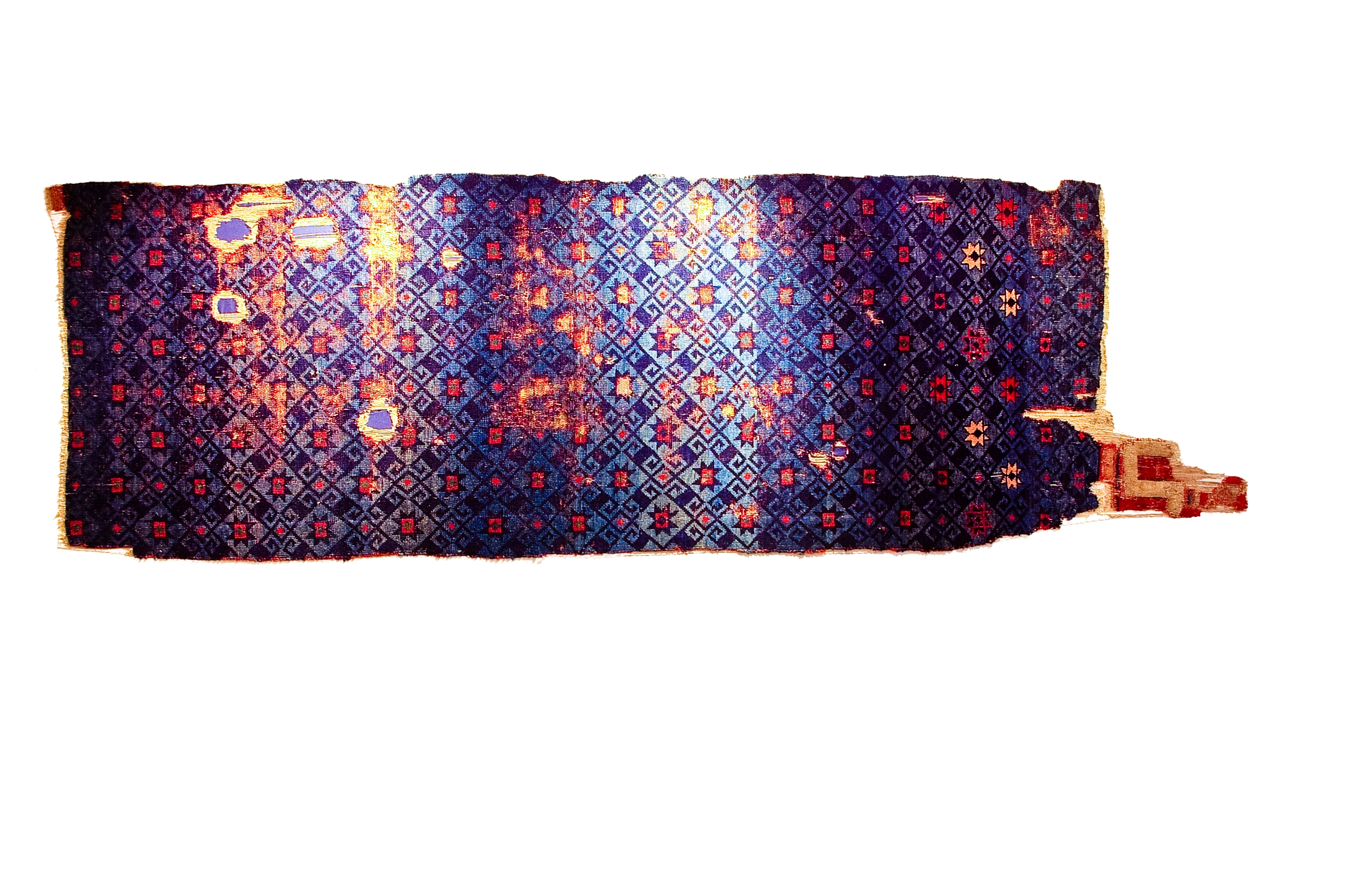
Carpet from Eşrefoğlu Mosque (Now in Konya Ethnography Museum)

Eşrefoğlu Mosque is a 13th-century mosque in Beyşehir, Konya Province, Turkey It is situated 100 metres (330 ft) north of the Beyşehir Lake

== History ==
During the last years of the Seljuks of Rum, various governors of the Seljuks enjoyed a partial independence. They established their own semi independent principalities named Anatolian Beyliks. Eshrefids (1280–1326) was a small beylik in center west Anatolia. After 1288, Süleyman Bey, the second bey of Eshrefids rebuilt the city of Beyşehir as a capital of his beylik. Although his beylik was relatively an unimportant political power, the city flourished as one of the cultural centers of the Seljuk world. In 1296, he commissioned a mosque in Beyşehir, one of the greatest mosques during the Anatolian beylik period. In 1302 he died and was buried in a sepulcher next to the mosque.

== Technical details ==
The plan of the mosque is rectangular, 31.8 by 46.55 metres (104.3 by 152.7 feet). But the corner at the north east side is enlarged to make room for the main portal. The dimensions of the portal are 7.1 by 10.1 metres (23 by 33 feet). There are two smaller gates and 35 windows. The roof is supported by 42 wooden columns. The length of each column is 7.5 metres (24.6 feet). Their diameter is 40 cm (16 in).

After seven centuries, unlike most other Seljuk wooden buildings, this mosque survives and it is used for regular services. The wooden columns are made of cedar and according to oral tradition, they were soaked in the Beyşehir lake for six months before being used in the building. At the center of the mosque there is a snow pit. Up to relatively recent times (1940s), the pit was used to be filled with snow from the nearby mountains. This snow both cooled the mosque during the summers and supplied the necessary humidity to the wooden infrastructure.

== Unesco World Heritage Tentative list ==
On 15 April 2011 the mosque was included in the list of World Heritage tentative list. The justification statements is "Esrefoglu Mosque includes all the main elements of early Anatolian Turkish architecture. The building is the biggest, best preserved wooden columned and roofed mosque in Islamic World."

== See also ==
- List of Turkish Grand Mosques

== Gallery ==
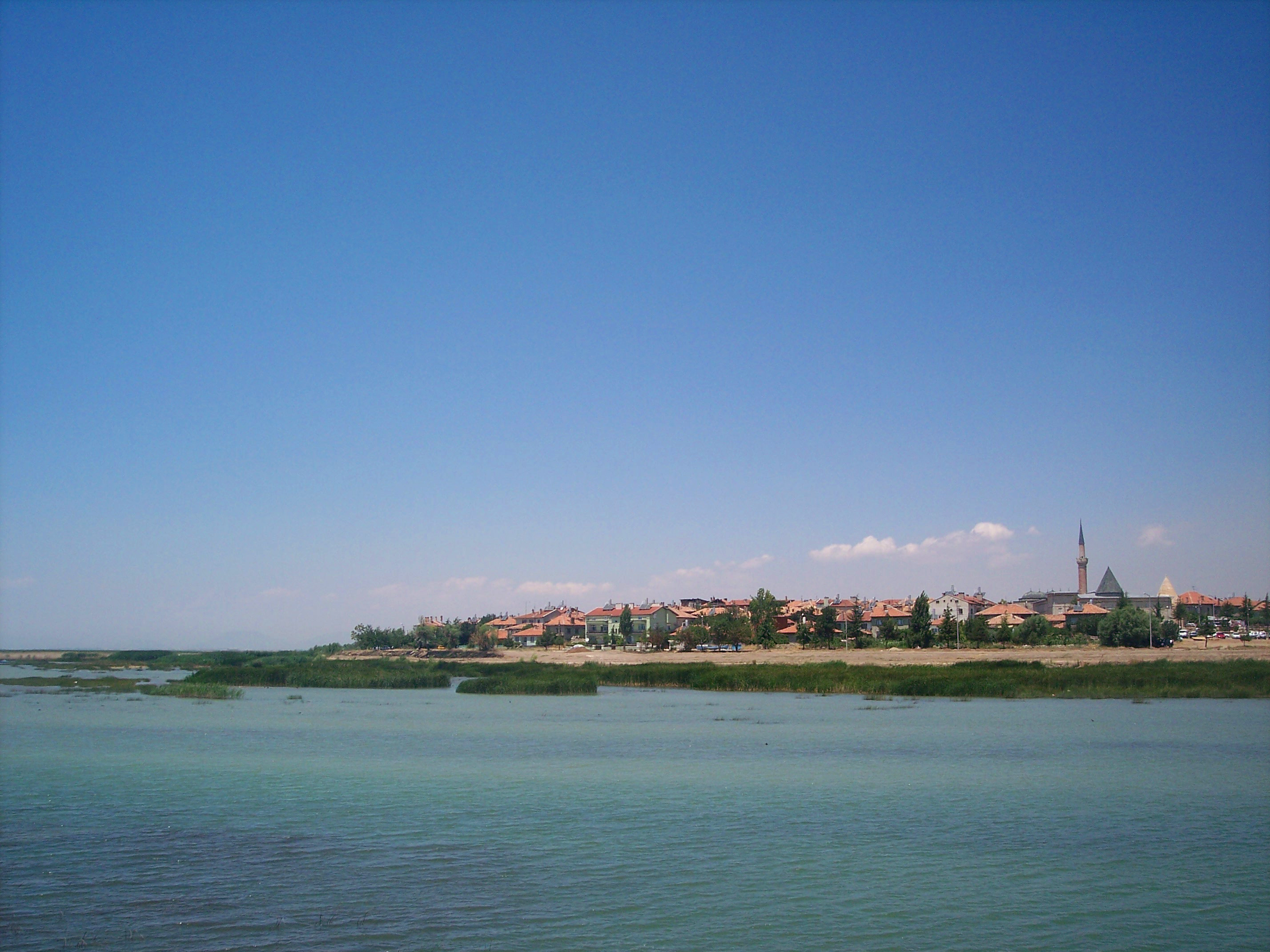
View of Beysehir from the lake, the Eşrefoğlu Mosque is on the right with the minaret.

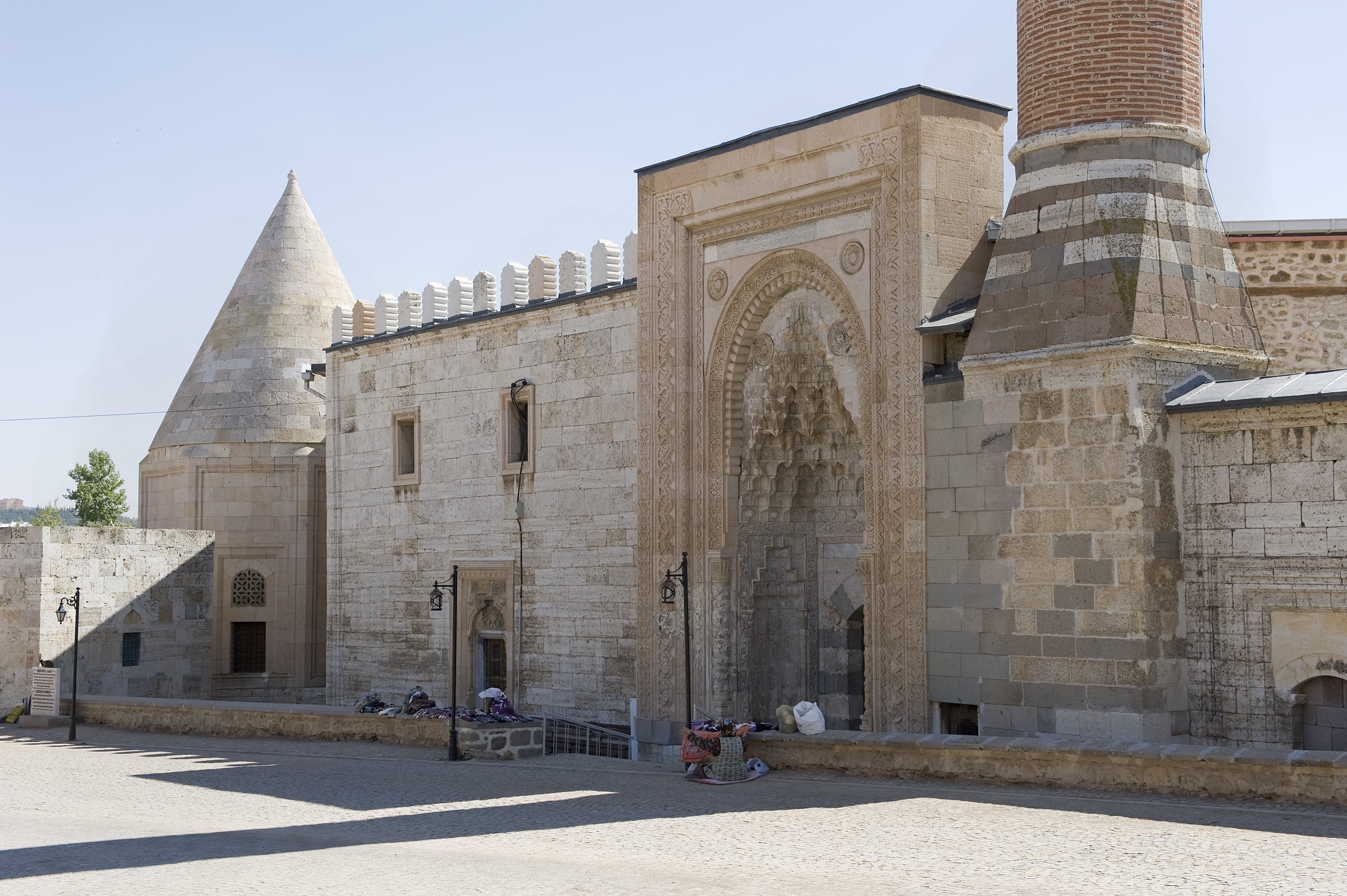
Eşrefoğlu Mosque Exterior

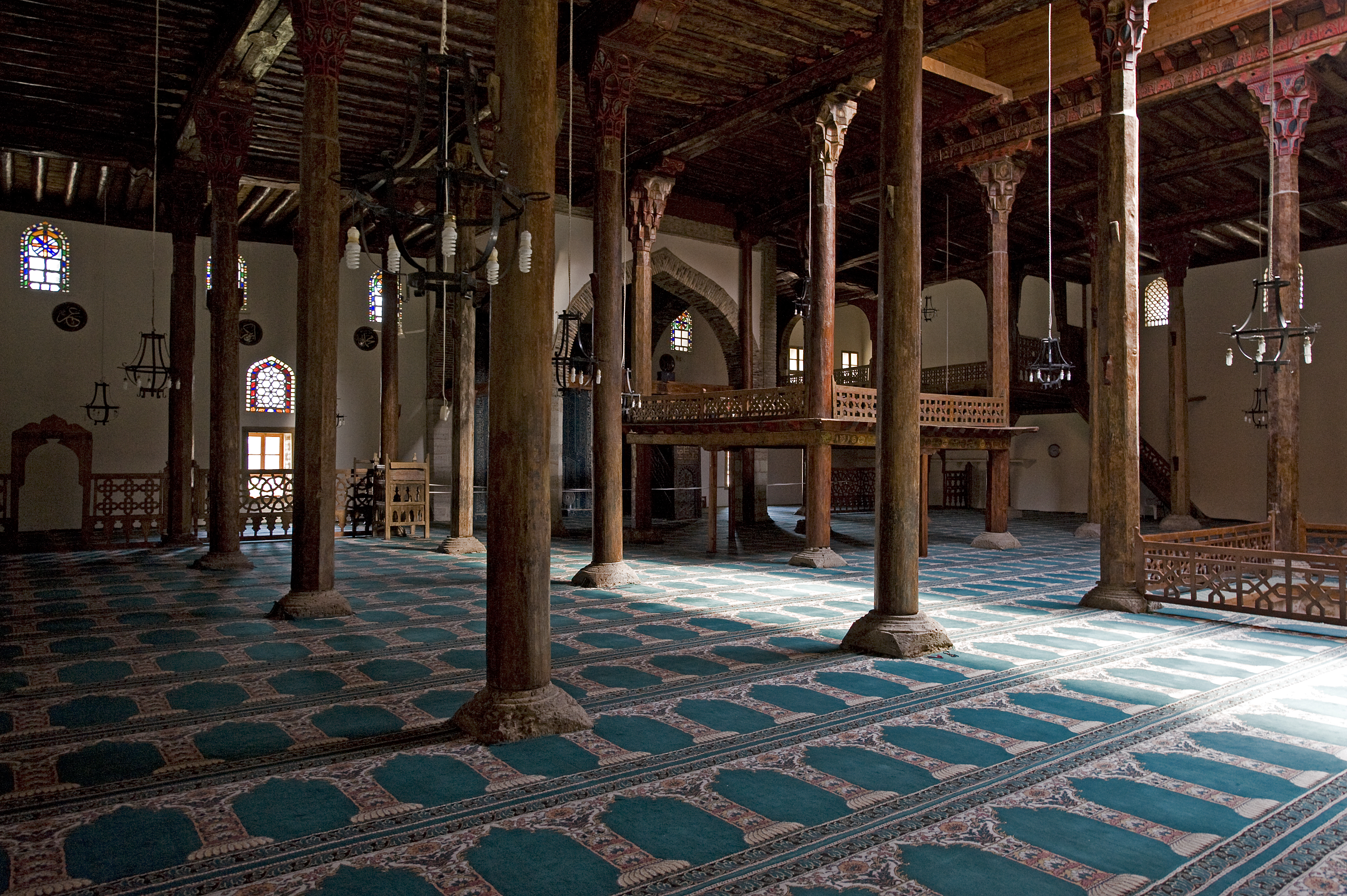
Eşrefoğlu Mosque Interior general view

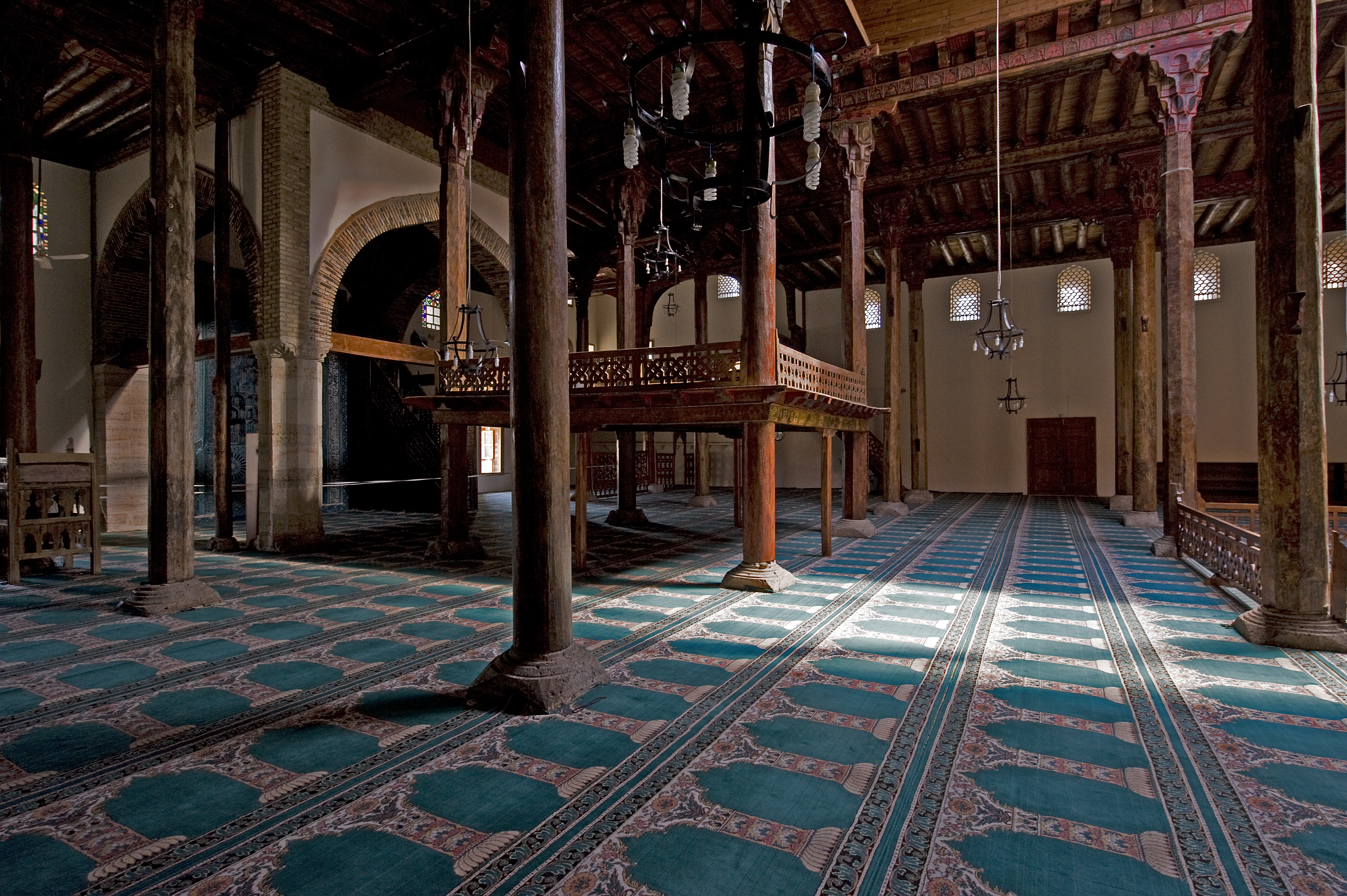
Eşrefoğlu Mosque Interior with müezzin mahfili

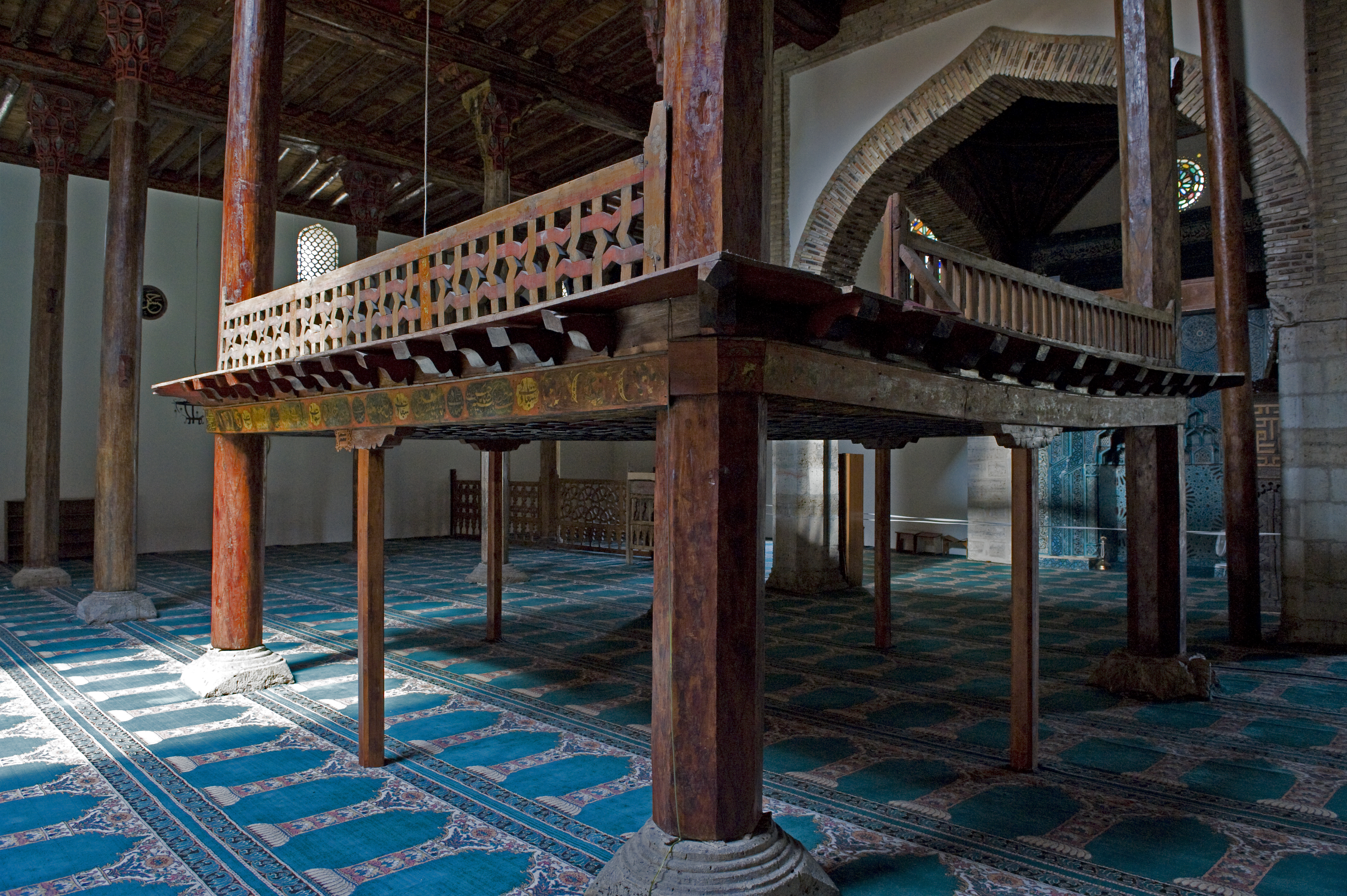
Eşrefoğlu Mosque Interior with müezzin mahfili

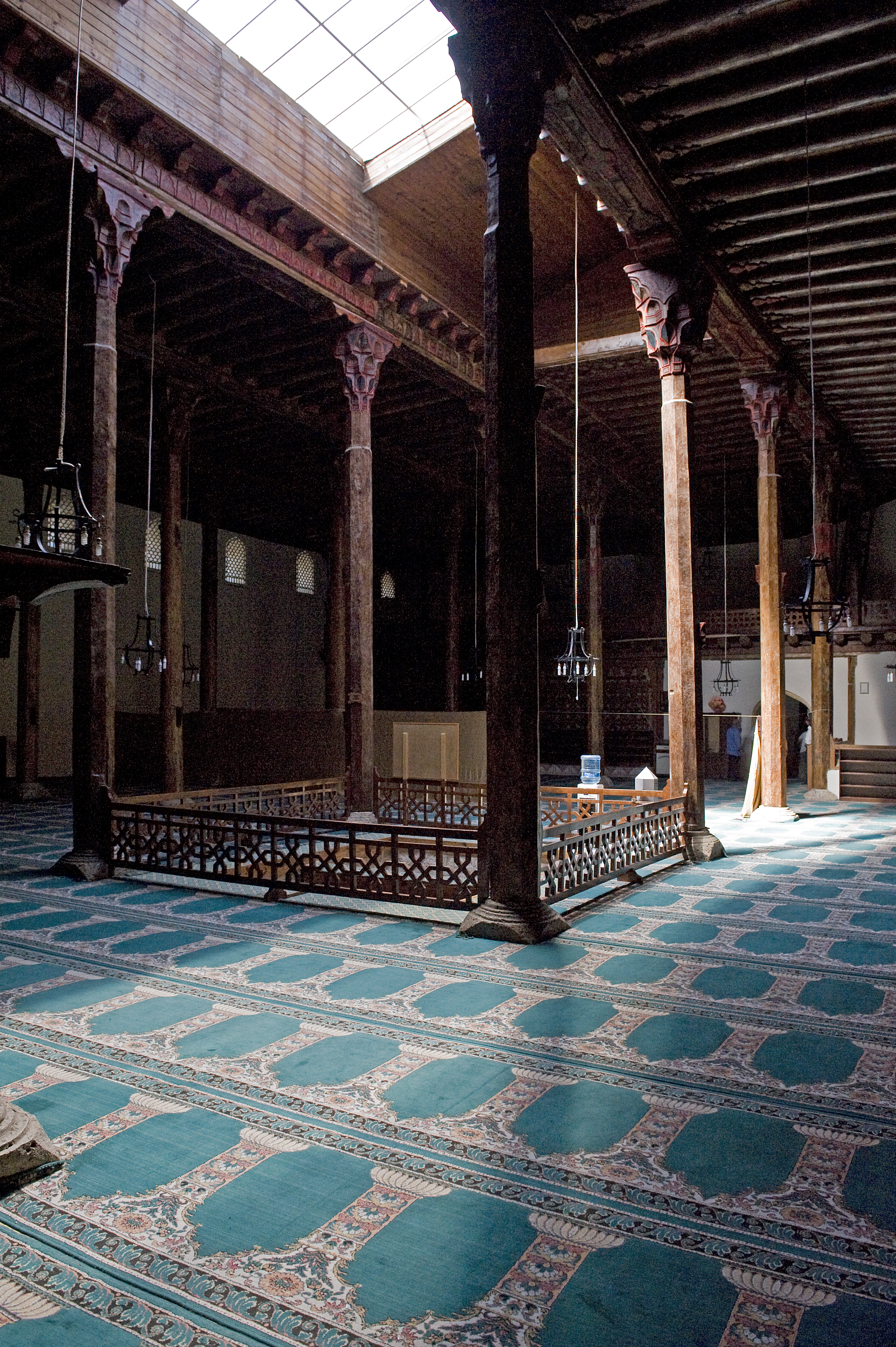
Eşrefoğlu Mosque Interior with snow pit

Eşrefoğlu Mosque Interior with balcony

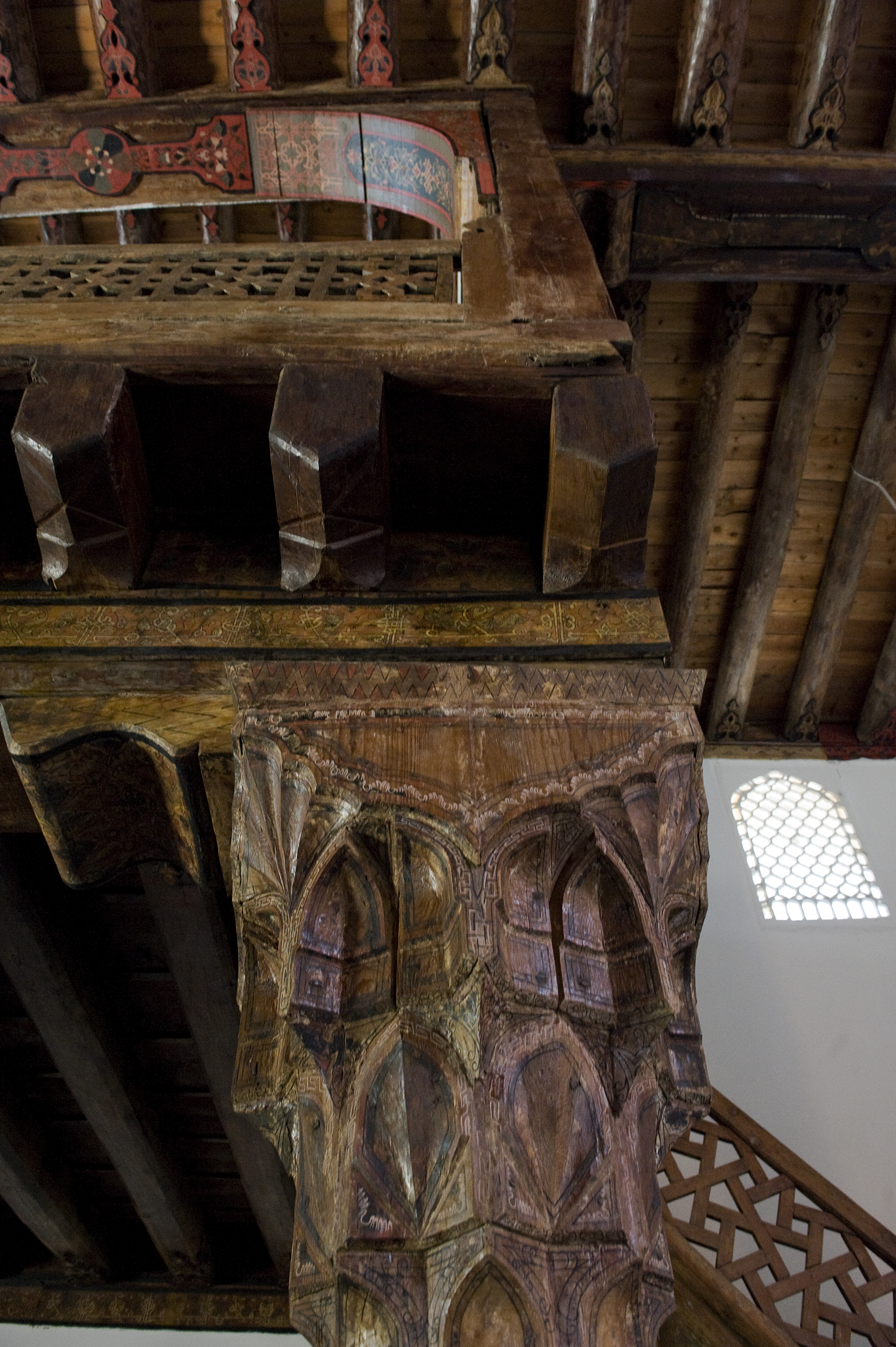
Eşrefoğlu Mosque Interior with balcony details

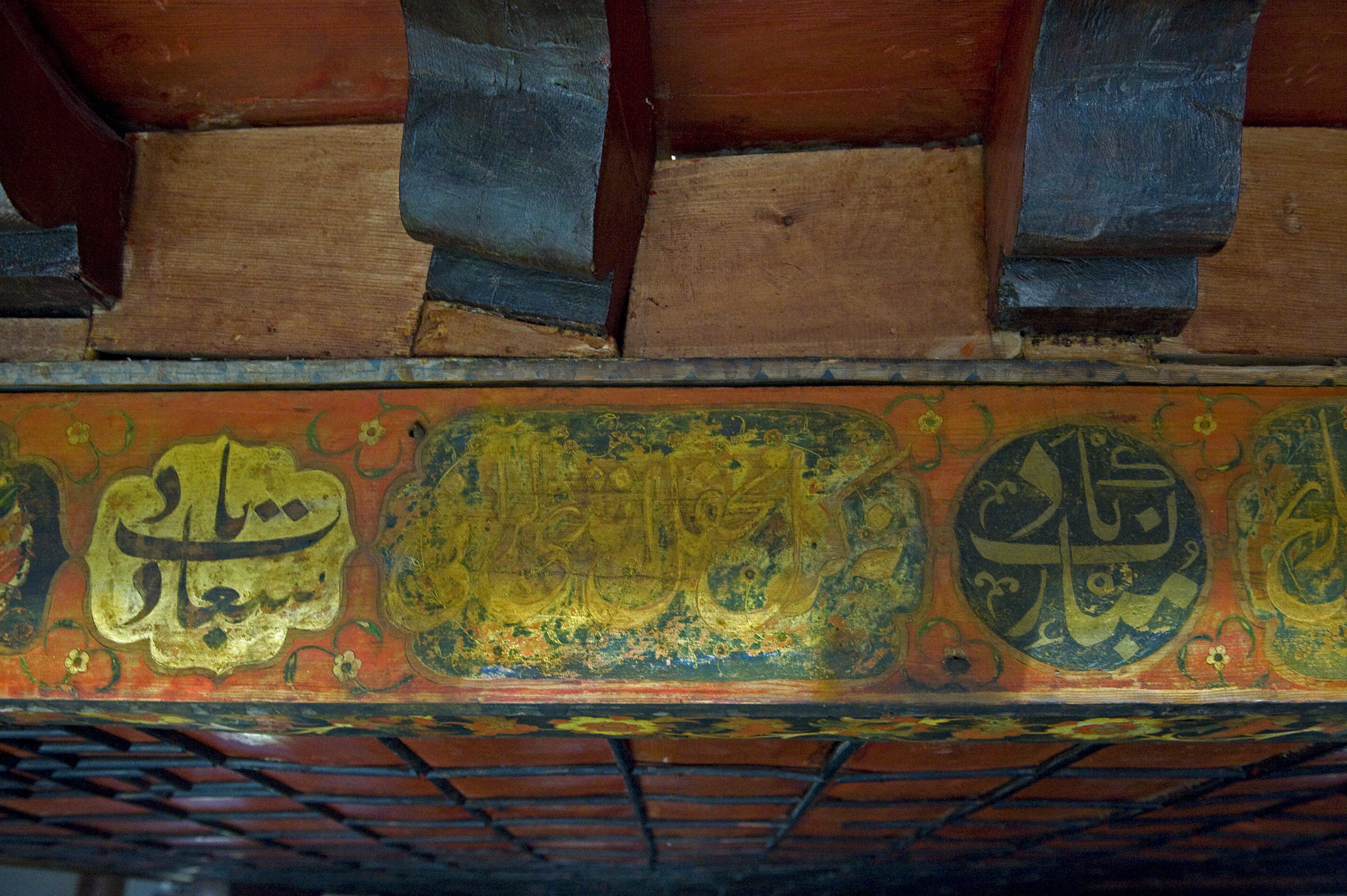
Eşrefoğlu Mosque Interior painting under balcony

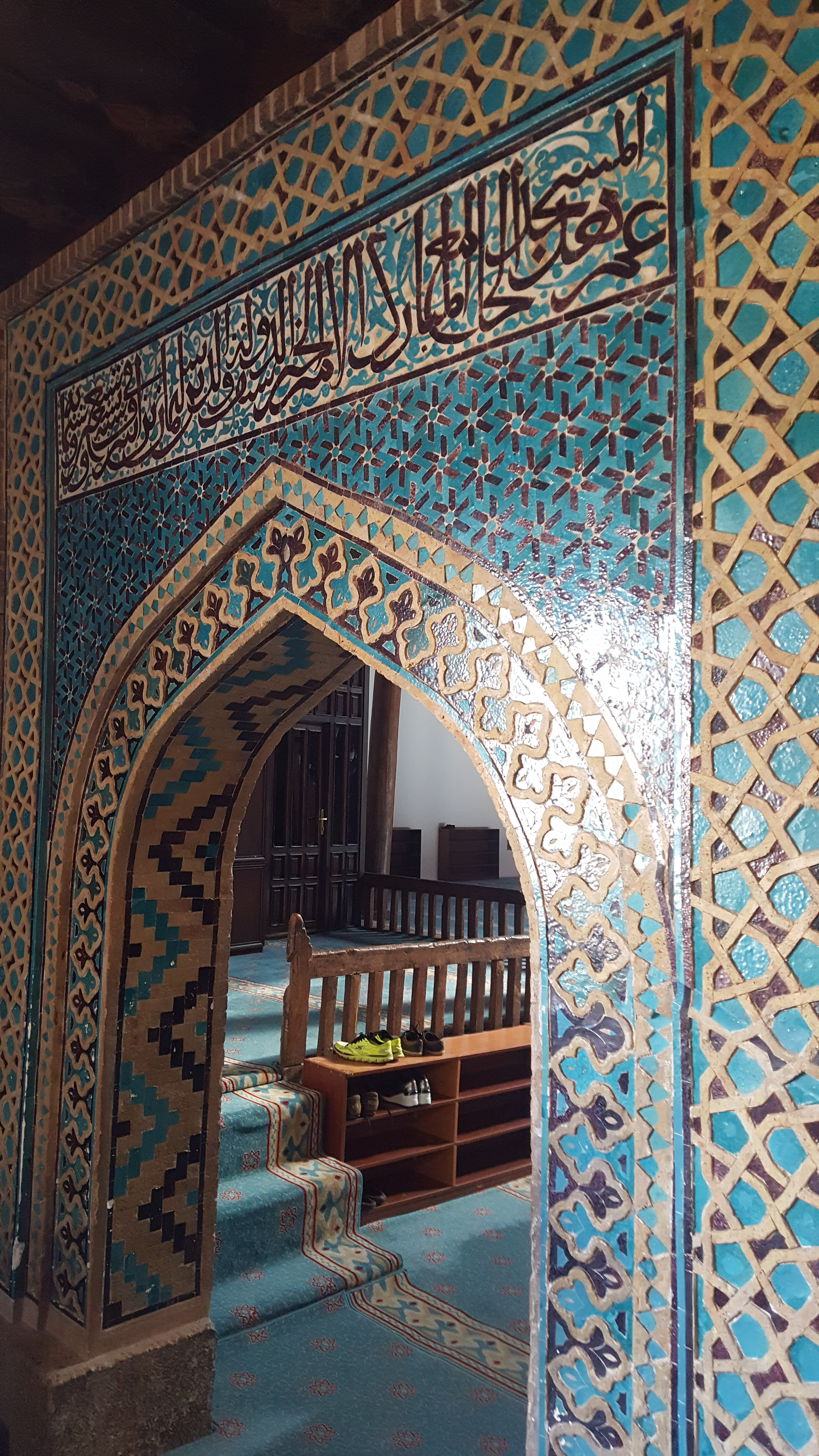
Entrance of the mosque

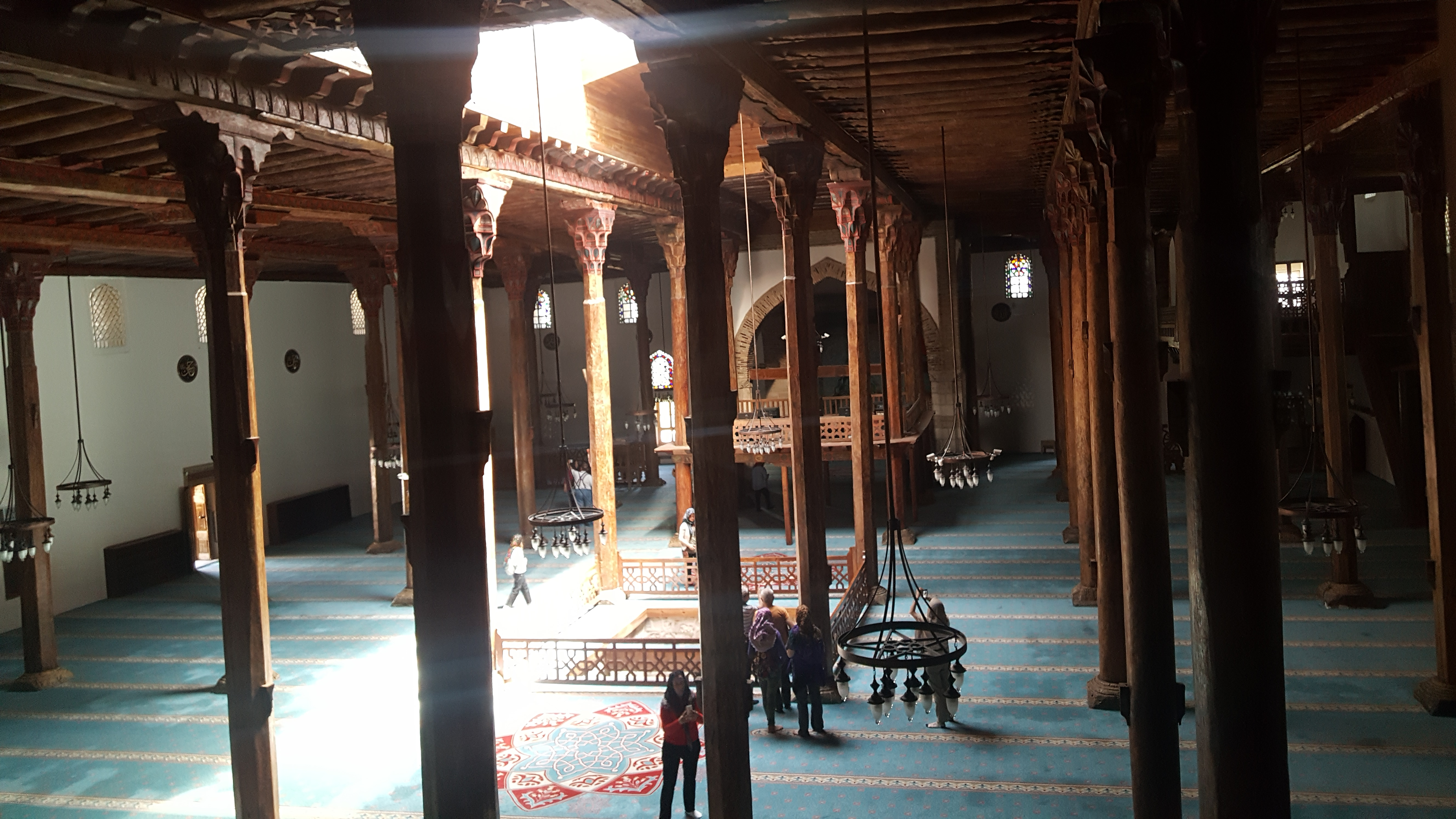
Wooden columns

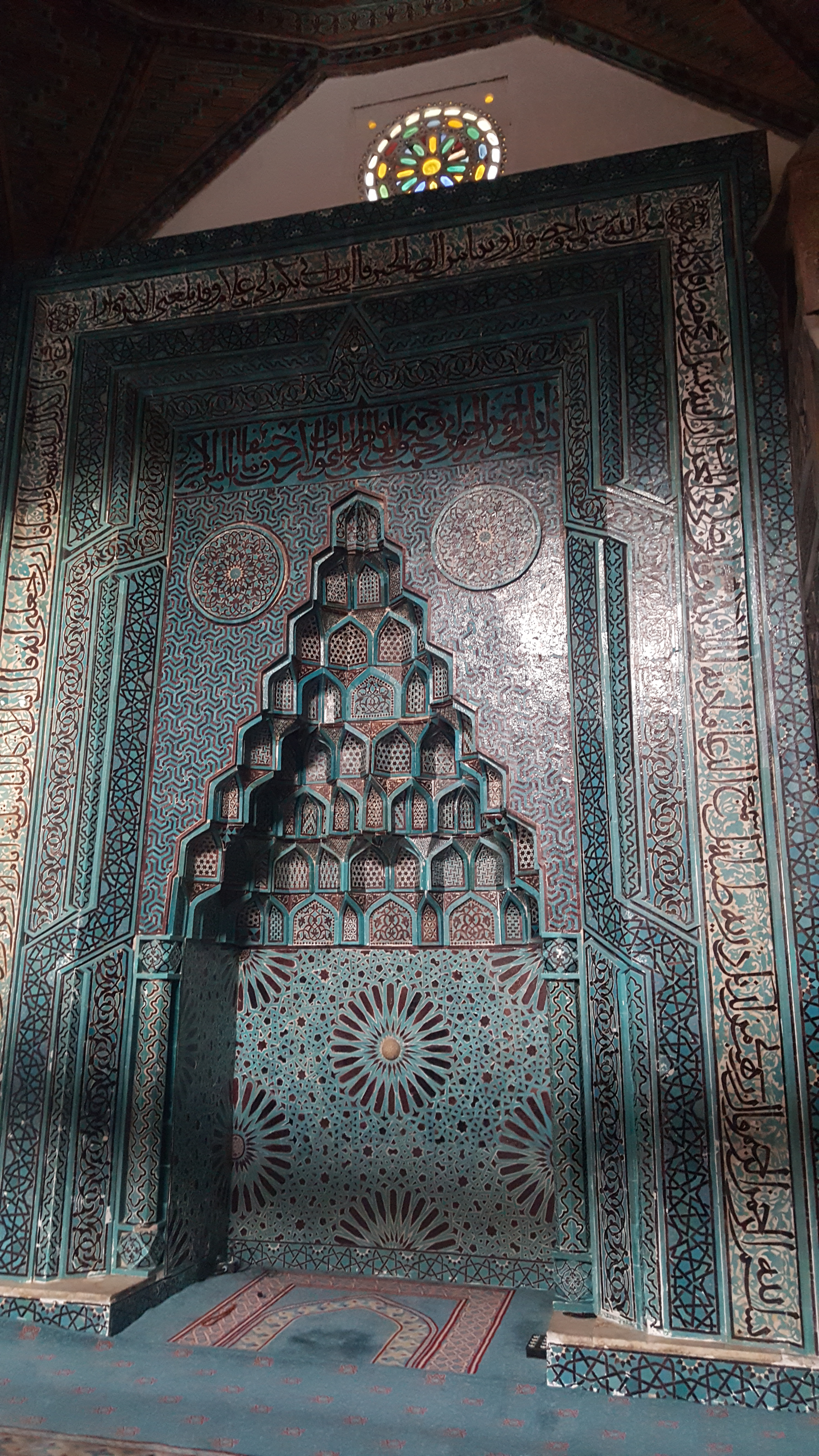
Mihrab

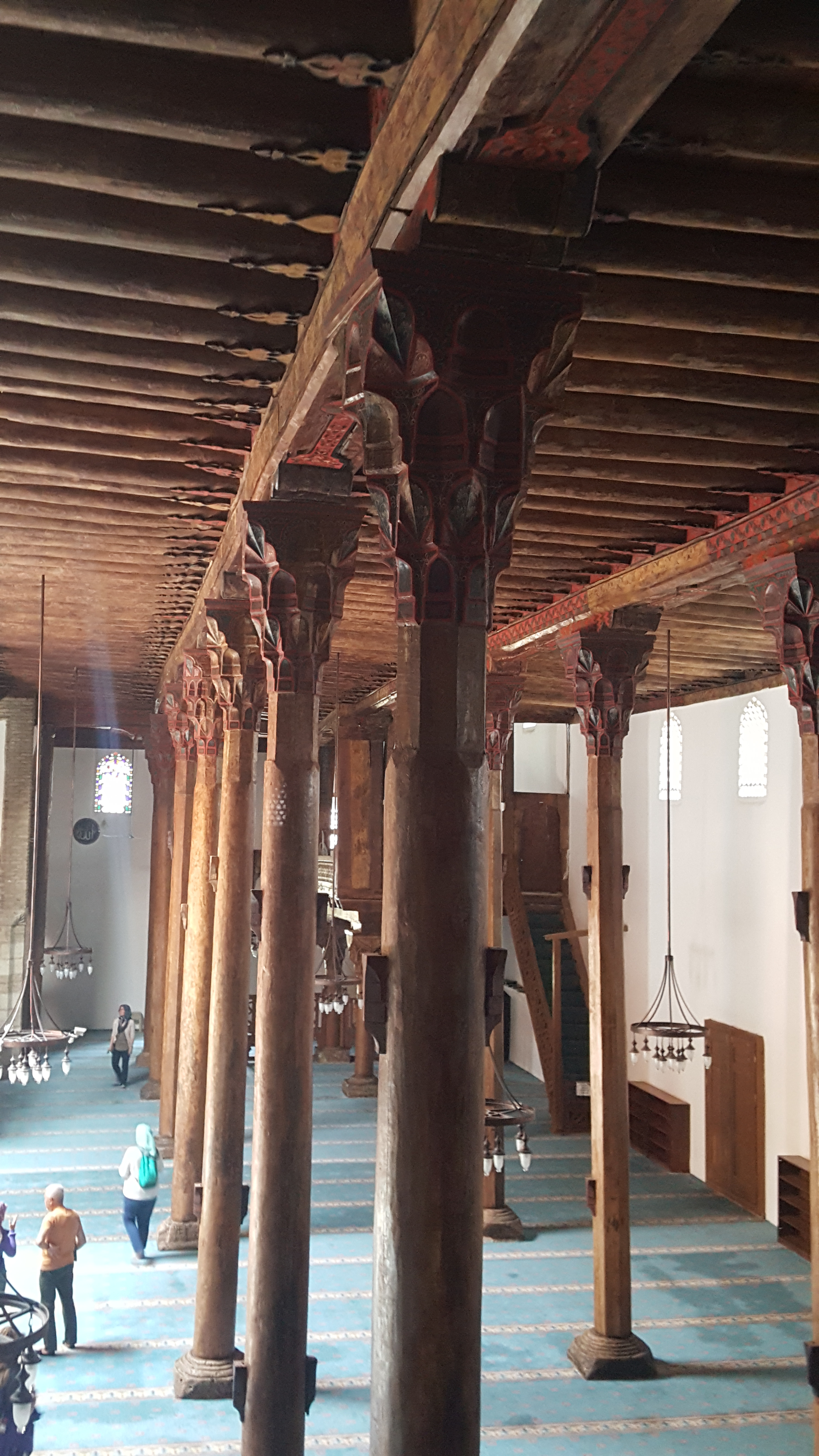

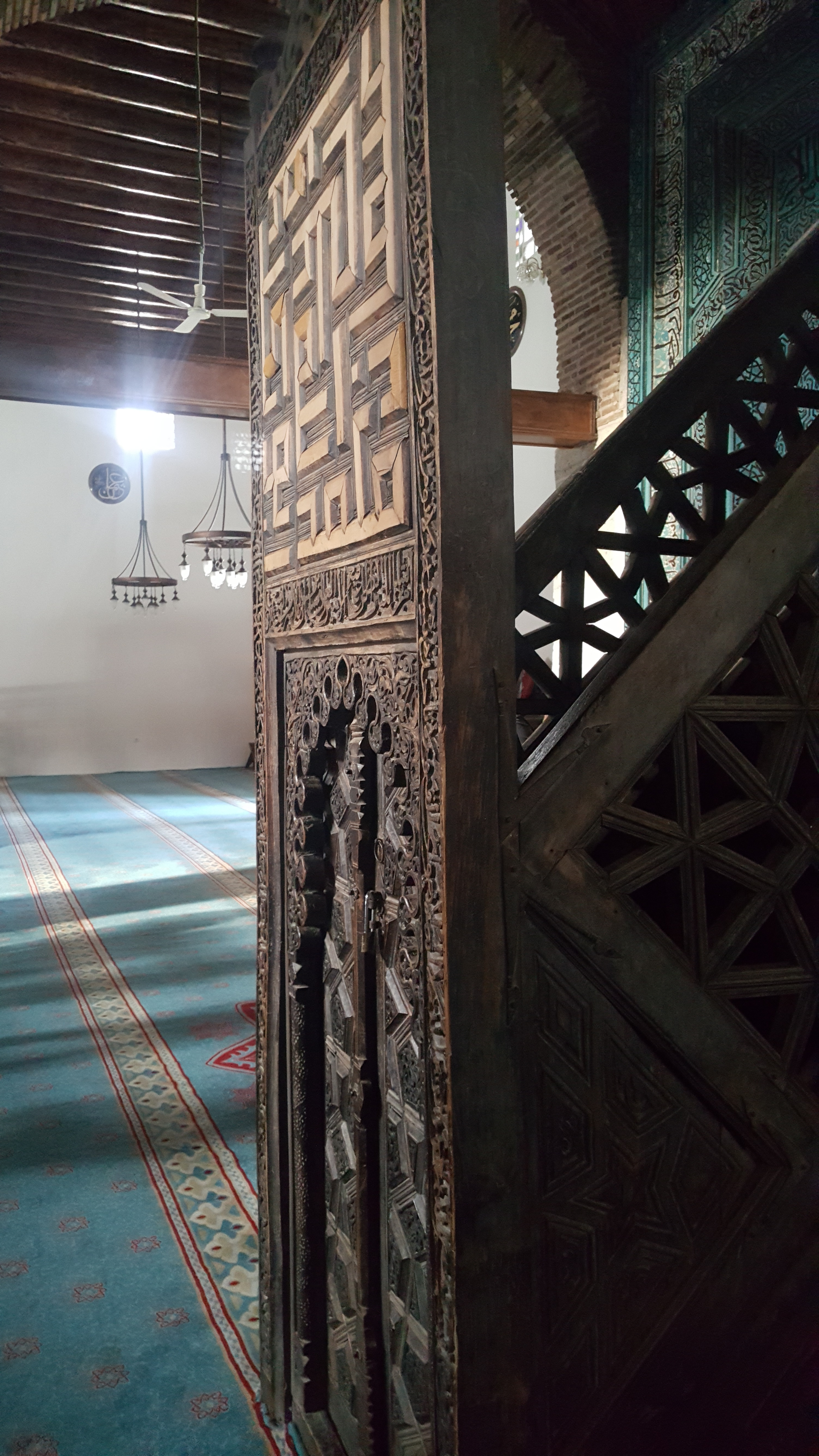
Minber

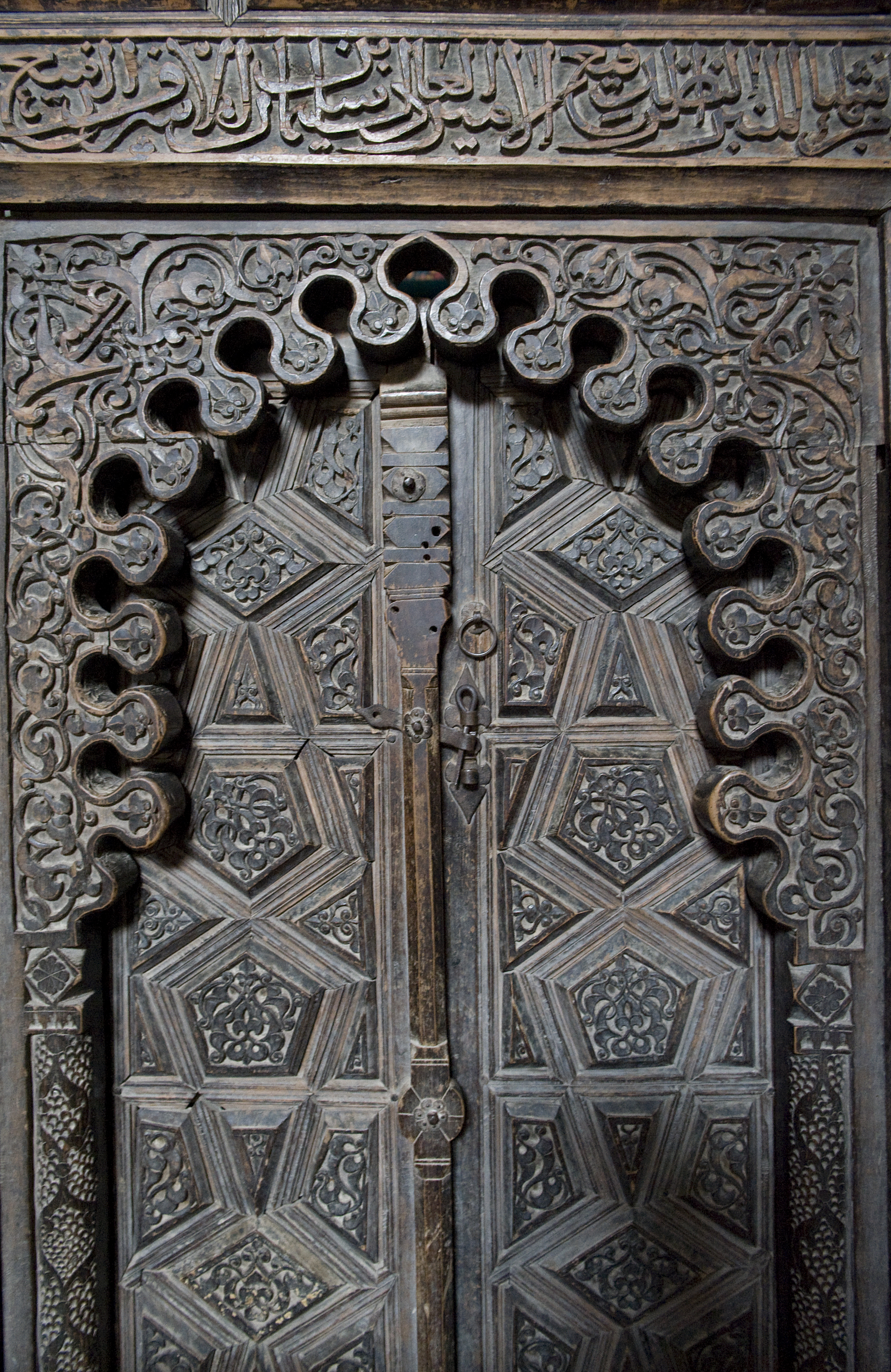
Eşrefoğlu Mosque Interior door to minber

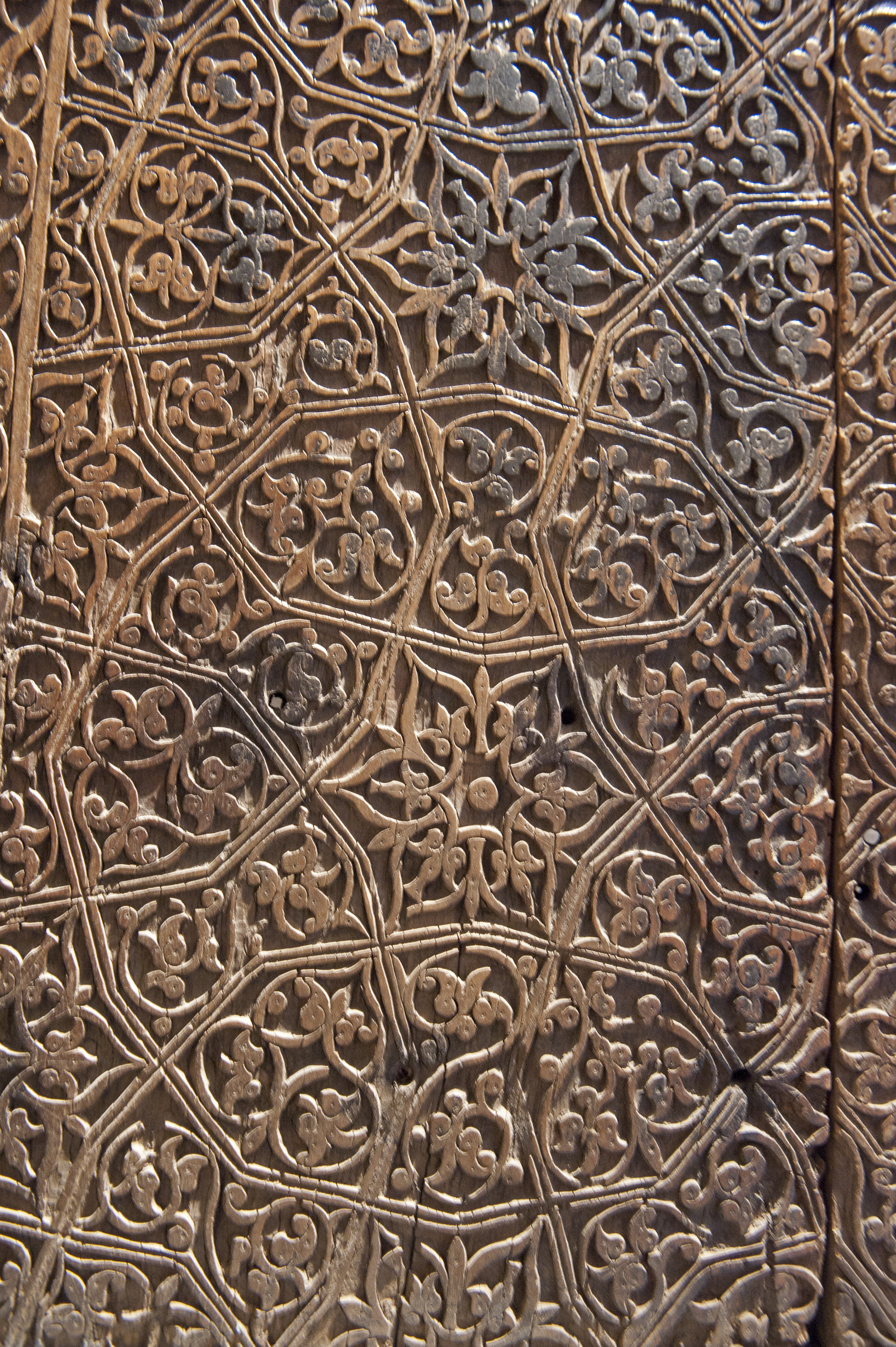
Ince Minare Medrese Museum Doors from Beysehir
