= Stone Bridge (Beyşehir) =

Taşköprü
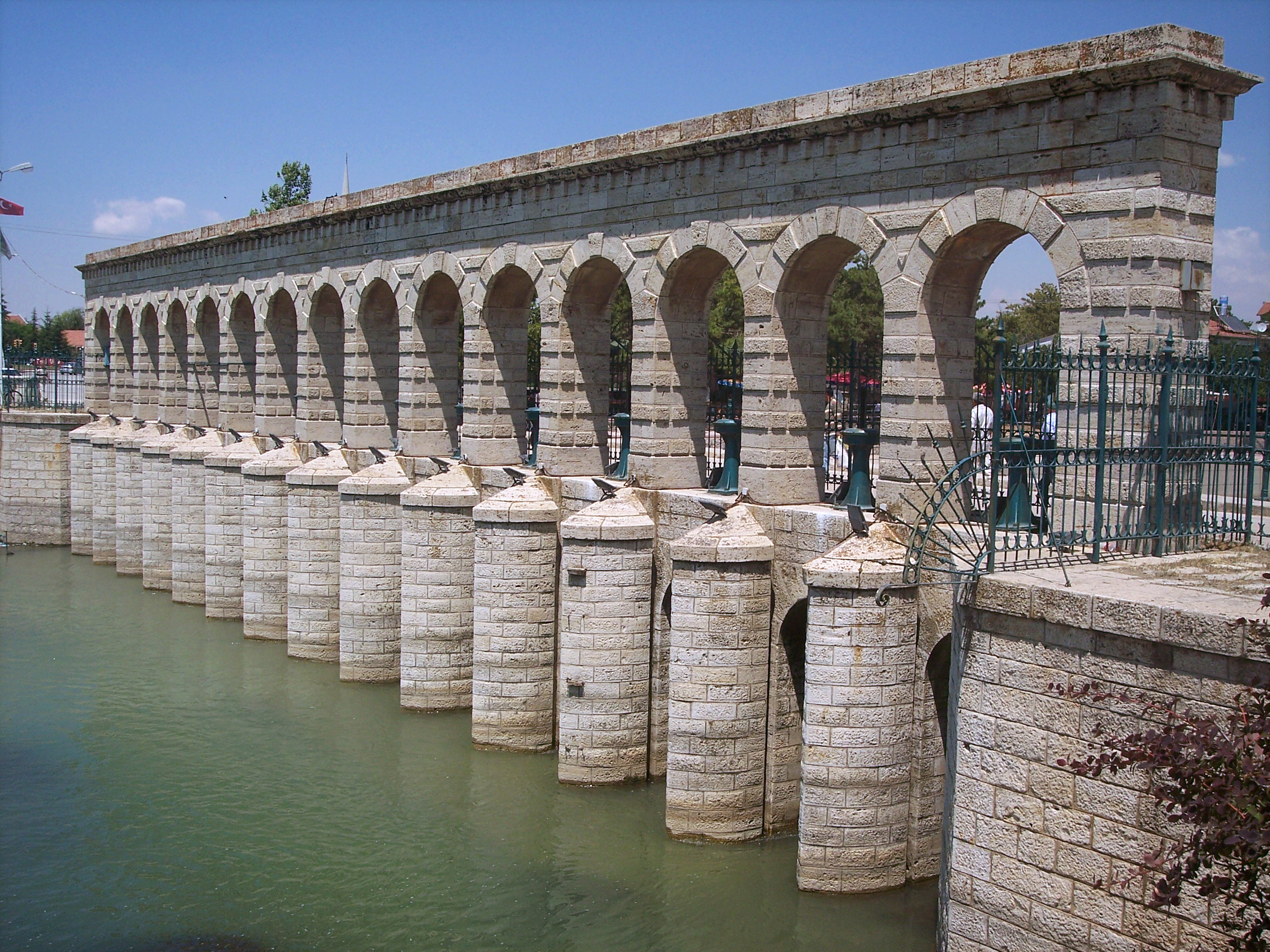
- Taşköprü as regulator dam.

- Location of Taşköprü in Turkey
- Country: Turkey
- Location: Beyşehir, Konya Province
- Coordinates: 37°40′50.5″N 31°43′22″E
- Purpose: Flood control, irrigation
- Status: Operational
- Construction began: 1908
- Opening date: 1914; 112 years ago

Dam and spillways
- Type of dam: Arch dam
- Impounds: Beyşehir-Soğla-Apa Canal
- Length: 42 m (138 ft)
- Width (crest): 6.35 m (20.8 ft)

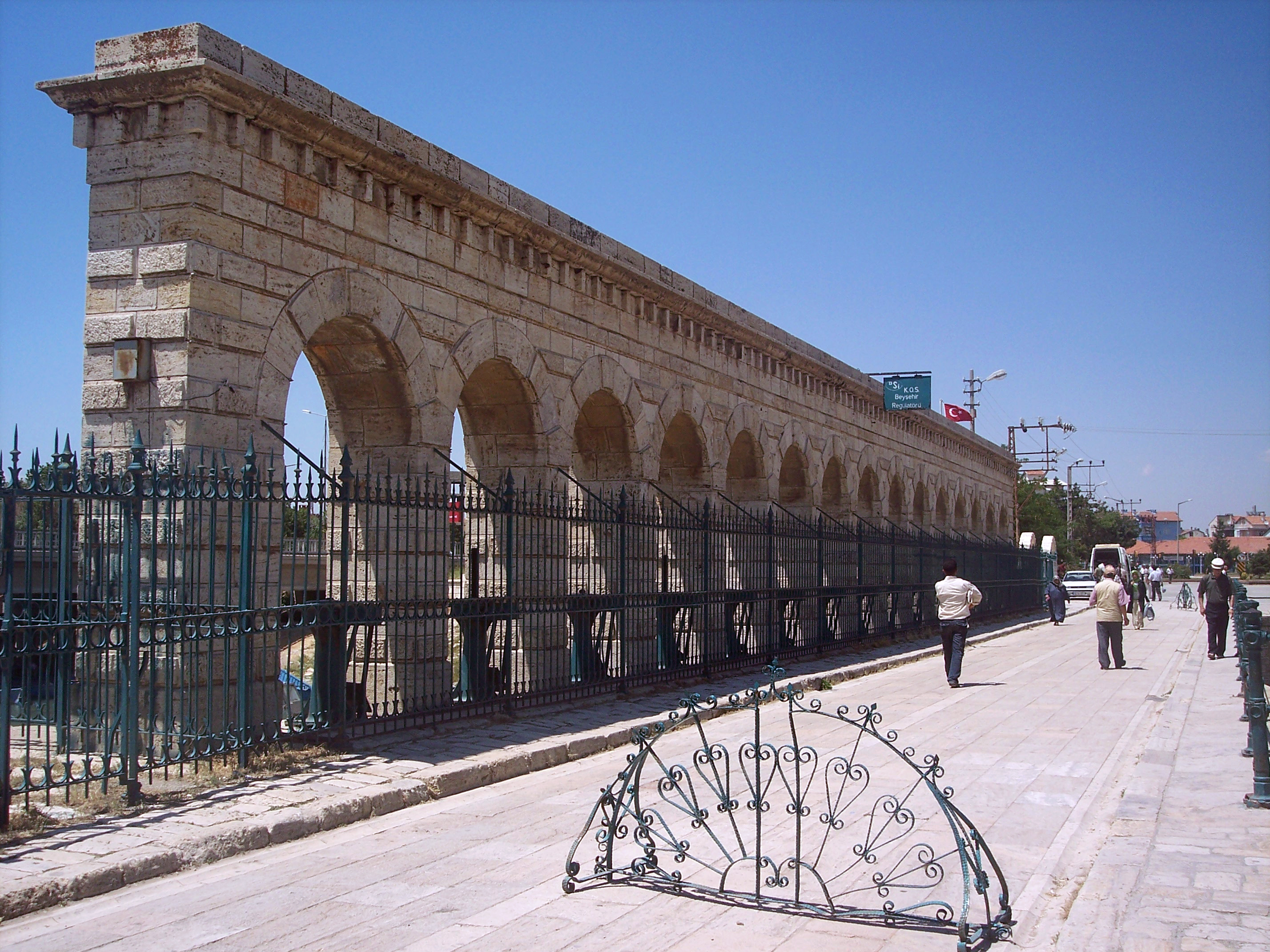
Taşköprü as pedestrian bridge.

Taşköprü, translated to Stone bridge, is a combined regulator dam and bridge located in Beyşehir district of Konya Province, central Turkey.

It was constructed as a flood barrier as part of the irrigational Konya Plain Project on the ground of a ruined 8–10 arched bridge between 1908 and 1914. Its completion was delayed due to repeated flooding at the Lake Beyşehir. The dam was commissioned by Albanian Ottoman Grand Vizier Mehmed Ferid Pasha of Vlorë (in office 1903–1908), (Turkish: Avlonyalı Ferid Paşa). Regulated water draining off the lake contributed to the rise of the formerly droughty and quaggy Konya Plain into a "granary".

Taşköprü is situated over the Beyşehir-Soğla-Apa Canal close to the Lake Beyşehir. The 42 m (138 ft)-long and 6.35 m (20.8 ft)-wide ashlar-masonry combined dam-bridge structure has two level of 15 arches and floodgates. The bridge was initially open to motorized traffic. After the building of a new road bridge west of it, Taşköprü is used today as a pedestrian bridge only.

With effect on July 12, 1980, the historic monumental structure was put under protection by the Cultural and Natural Heritage Protection Board.
