= Eflatun Pınar =

Ancient Hittite monument

Coordinates: 37°49′22″N 31°41′21″E

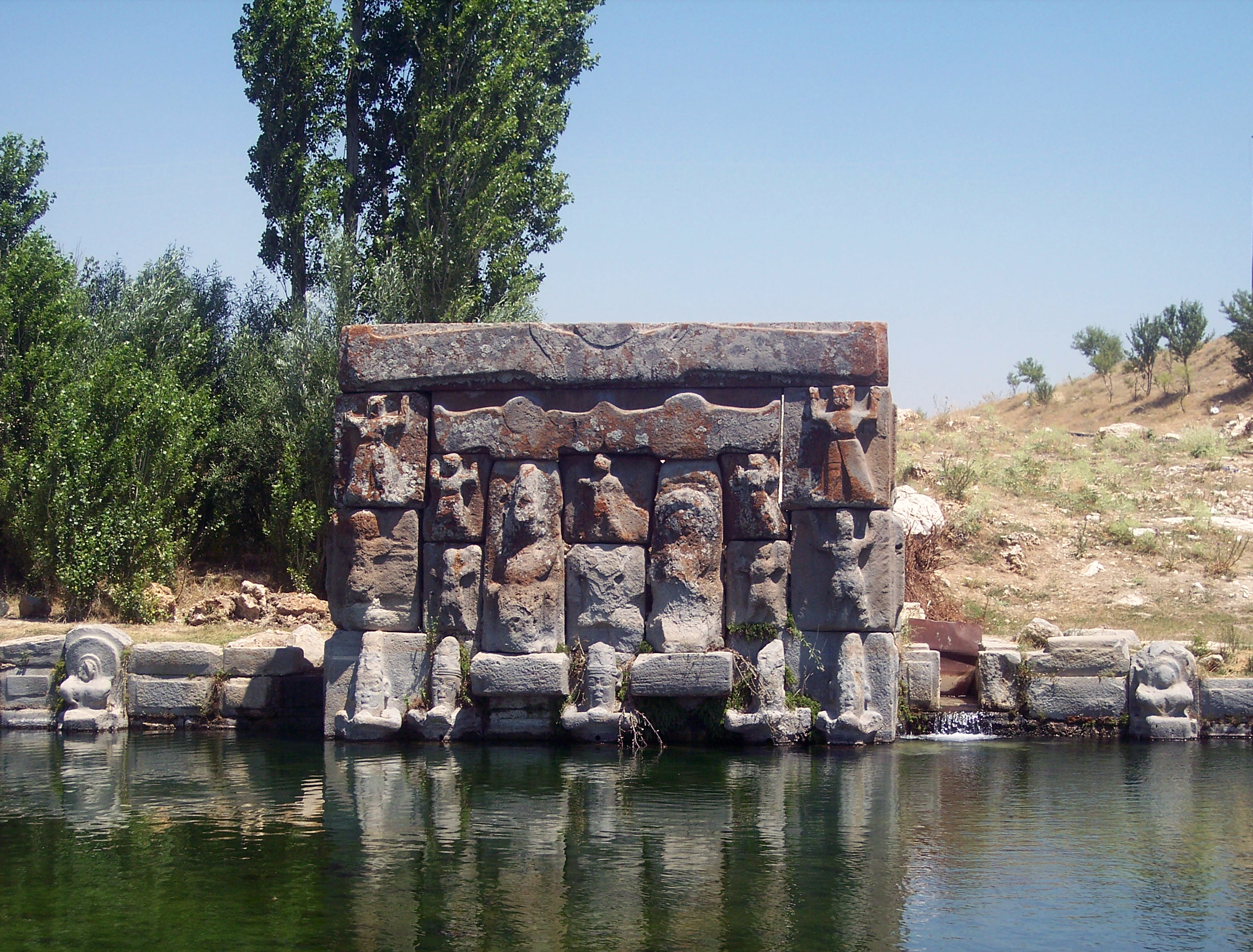
Eflatun Pınar

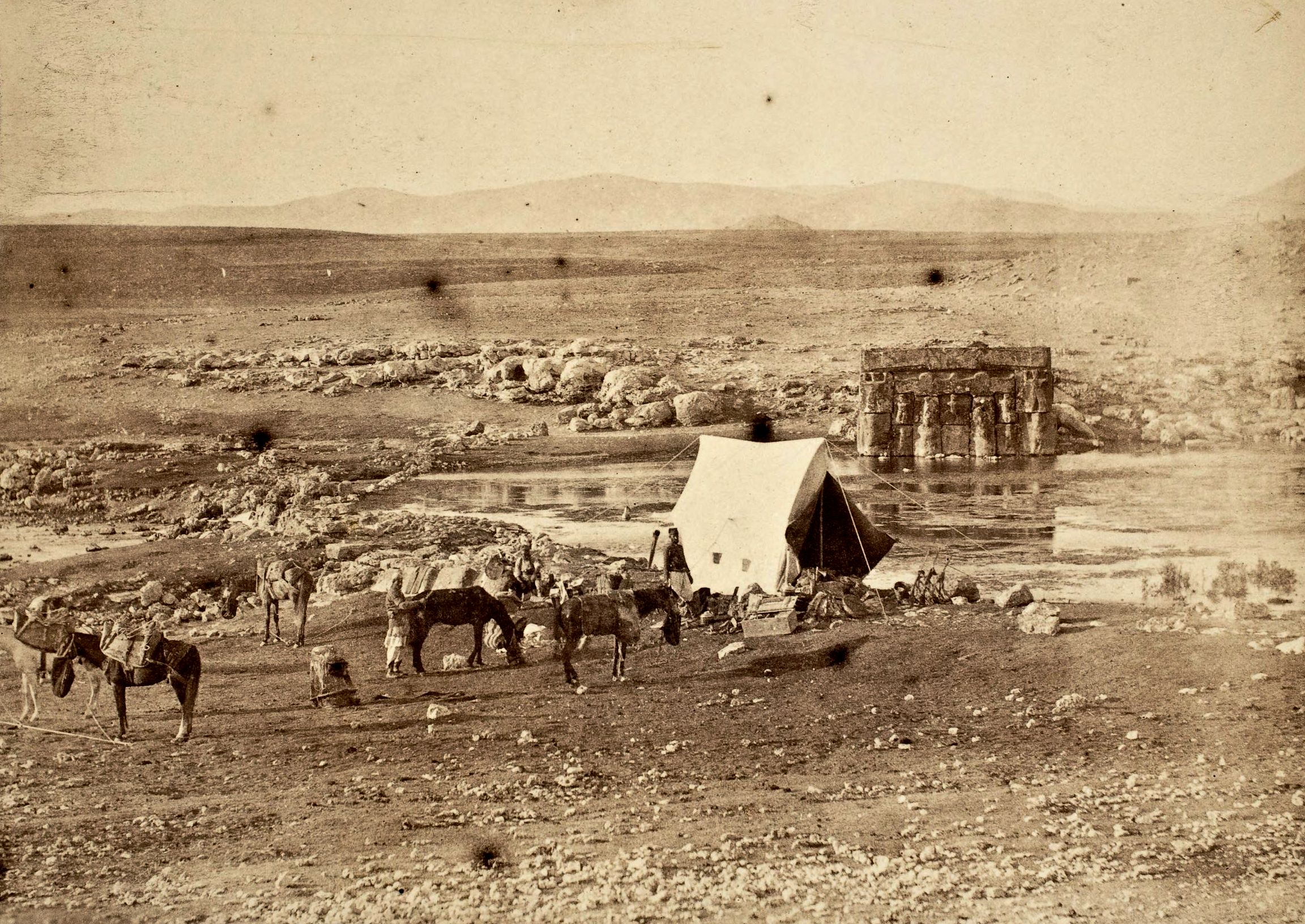
John Henry Haynes. Eflatun Pınar 1887

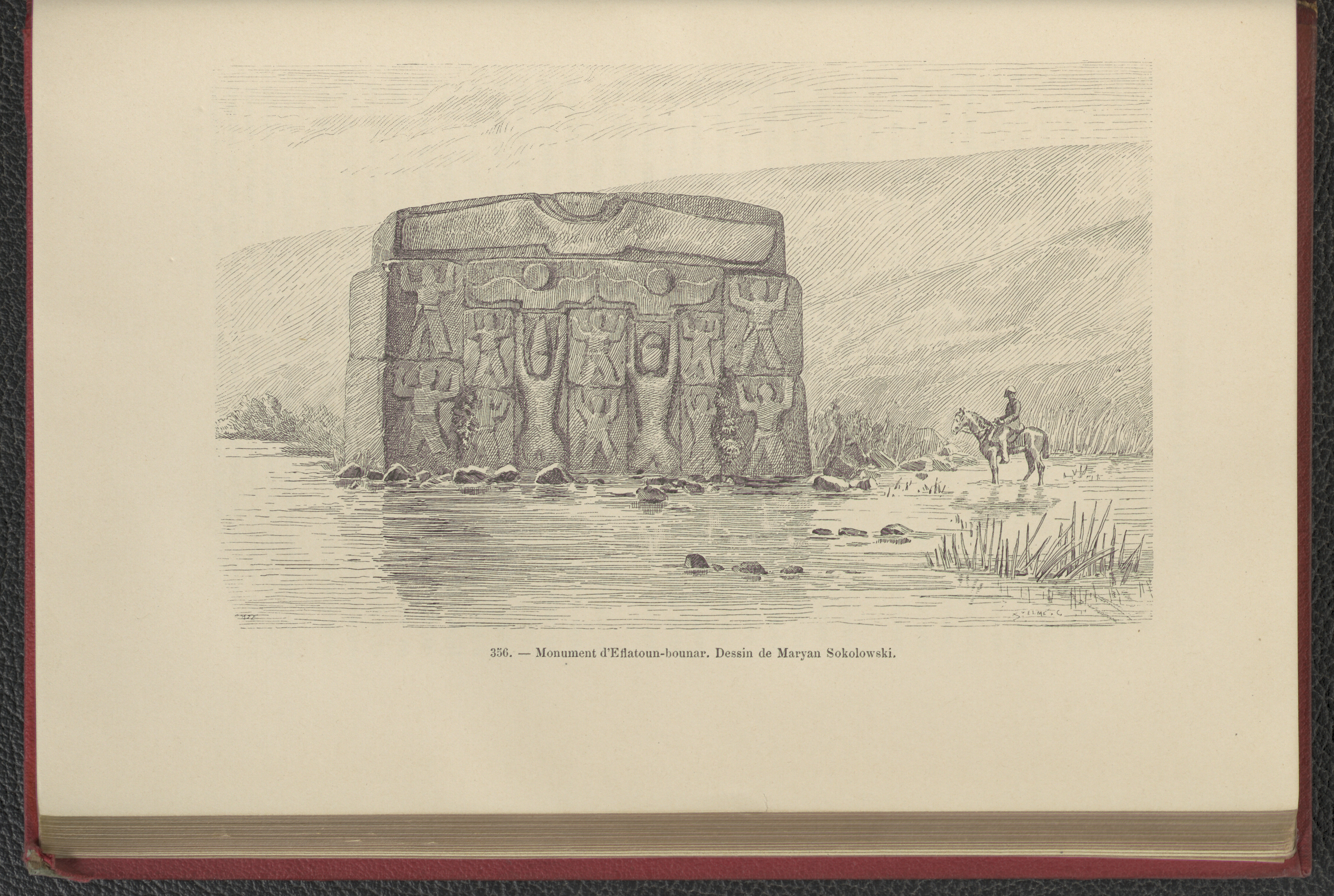
Drawing in Histoire de l'art dans l'antiquité by Georges Perrot (1887)

Eflatun Pınar (Turkish: Eflatunpınar, transl. Plato's Spring) is the name given to a spring, which rises up from the ground, and the stone-built pool monument built at the time of the Hittite Empire. The spring lies inside the Lake Beyşehir National Park, 85 km (53 mi) west of Konya, and drains into Lake Beyşehir in central Anatolia at ancient Pisidia region. During the Late Bronze Age, a sacred pool monument was built here in trachyte ashlar masonry dedicated to the sacred spring cult of ancient Hittites. The site has been identified with the "spring pool of Arimatta" mentioned in a treaty between Hittite King Tudhaliya IV and King Kurunta of Tarhuntassa, which is preserved on a bronze tablet found at Hattusa. The monument was interpreted as a shrine to Plato during the medieval (Seljuk) period.

== Overview ==
Eflatun Pınar's location near the lake shore corresponds to an almost exact level with other important ruins on the opposite shore, those of Kubadabad Palace, which were built by Seljuks.

Eflatun Pınar was briefly examined by the University of Oxford archaeologist Dr. Lucia Nixon in her paper on Çatalhöyük, and she makes use of F.W.Hasluck's early-20th century work. The site remains largely unexplored to date.

According to ArchaeoNews, Eflatun Pınar "designates the most south-westerly point of the Hittite expansion. The uniqueness of this place is also demonstrated by the fact that this is one of the few discovered places where the Hittites presented human figures from the front."

Eflatun Pınar has been on the Tentative UNESCO World Heritage list since 2014. The spring produces cold and clear water.

The Turkish name means 'lilac coloured or violet spring', though its name actually means Plato's Spring, stemming from the association between Plato and Konya since Selcuk times. The monument shows "a hierarchical image of the Hittite Pantheon represented on it", according to the UNESCO World Heritage site. The image depicts "five mountain gods with the characteristic skirts with scales forming the bottom row of the fully excavated main monument". Above these are seated a male and female "divine couple", probably representing the storm god and sun goddess, Tarhunna and Arinniti. The same figures are probably also represented on the Southern and Eastern walls.

Aside from these main images, "several sculptures of reclined animals were found in the filler of the basin, it concerned probably the execution of lions, deer and bulls. This rich supply of sculptures adds to already more long well known remainder of a twin animals group. Votive miniature ceramic vessels very similar to those found in Bogazkoy Hattusa ponds were also uncovered inside the basin together with one bronze pin."

According to Somewhere Wonderful, "The site has recently been ‘improved’ by Konya's museum service; in a crass mix of the twee and the totalitarian its operatives have installed willow-pattern wooden bridges while a barbed-wire fence with concrete uprights keeps the cattle out."
