= Konya Ethnography Museum =

- Konya Etnografya Müzesi
- Location within Turkey
- Established: 6 December 1975; 50 years ago
- Location: Sahip Ata St., Konya, Turkey
- Coordinates: 37°52′00″N 32°29′29″E
- Type: Ethnographic museum

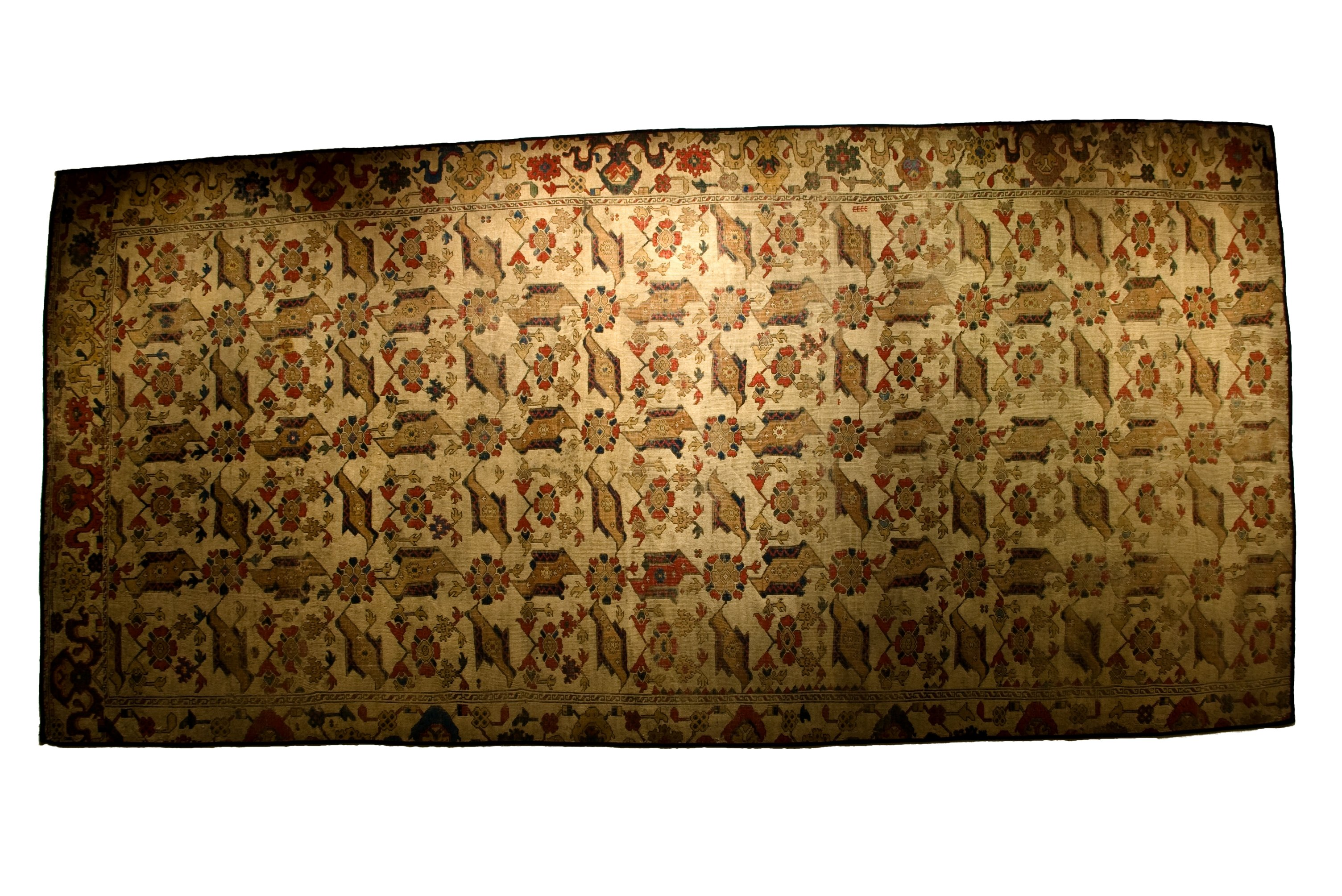
A 16th-century carpet from Mevlana lodge

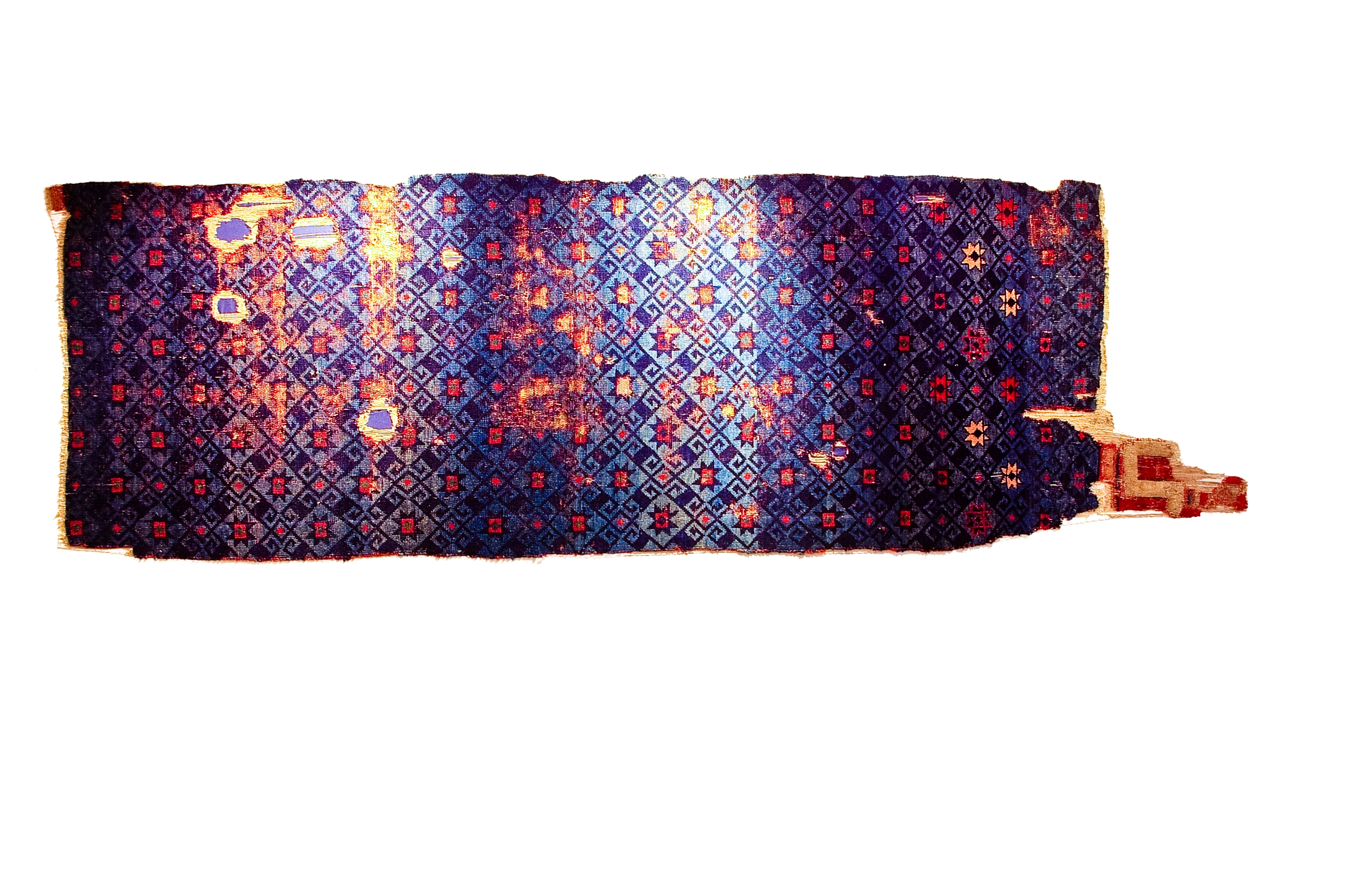
A carpet from Eşrefoğlu Mosque

Konya Ethnography Museum (Turkish: Konya Etnografya Müzesi) is an ethnographic museum devoted to the people, cultures and lifestyle in and around Konya, Turkey.

The museum is on Sahip Ata Street. It is a two-story building with a basement. The basement is reserved for the offices and the photoshop. The conference room is in the ground floor. The museum was established on 6 December 1975.

== Exhibited items ==
The exhibited items are:

- Historical carpets: Some of more notable carpets are those from Eşrefoğlu Mosque dated to 13th and 15th centuries.
- Women’s traditional wear such as bindallı, salta, cepken and kaftan etc.
- Ornaments such as embroidery, bracelet and neckband etc.
- Ottoman writing tools
- Examples of early Konya newspapers,
- Metallic keys and locks,
- Copper, bronze, glass and porcelain kitchen tools,
- Silver and bronze candelabras,
- Coffee tools,
- Beads,
- Weapons,
- Hand written books.

The personal ethnographic collections of Refet Yardımcı and Kenan Özbel are also on display in the museum.
