= Lake Beyşehir National Park =

National park in Konya, Turkey

- Beyşehir Gölü Milli Parkı
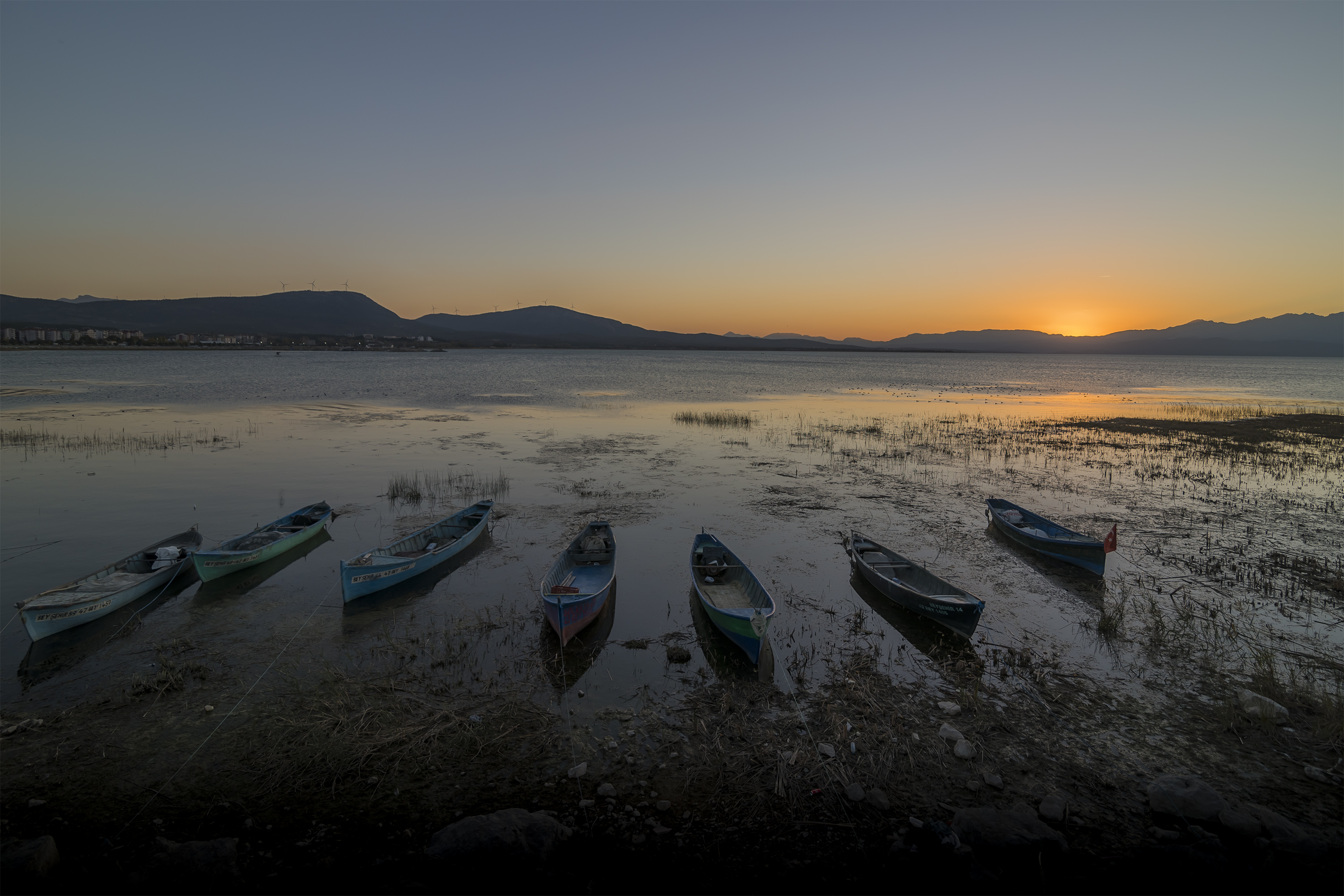
- A viey of the national park seen from Karatepe. Ancient fortification wall at the open-air museum (left) and Aslantaş Dam reservoir (right).

- Location within Turkey
- Location: Beyşehir-Hüyük, Konya Province, Turkey
- Coordinates: 37°41′45.12″N 31°42′50.32″E
- Area: 86,855 ha (214,620 acres)
- Established: January 31, 1993
- Governing body: Ministry of Forest and Water Management
- Website: www.milliparklar.gov.tr/mp/beysehirgolu/index.htm

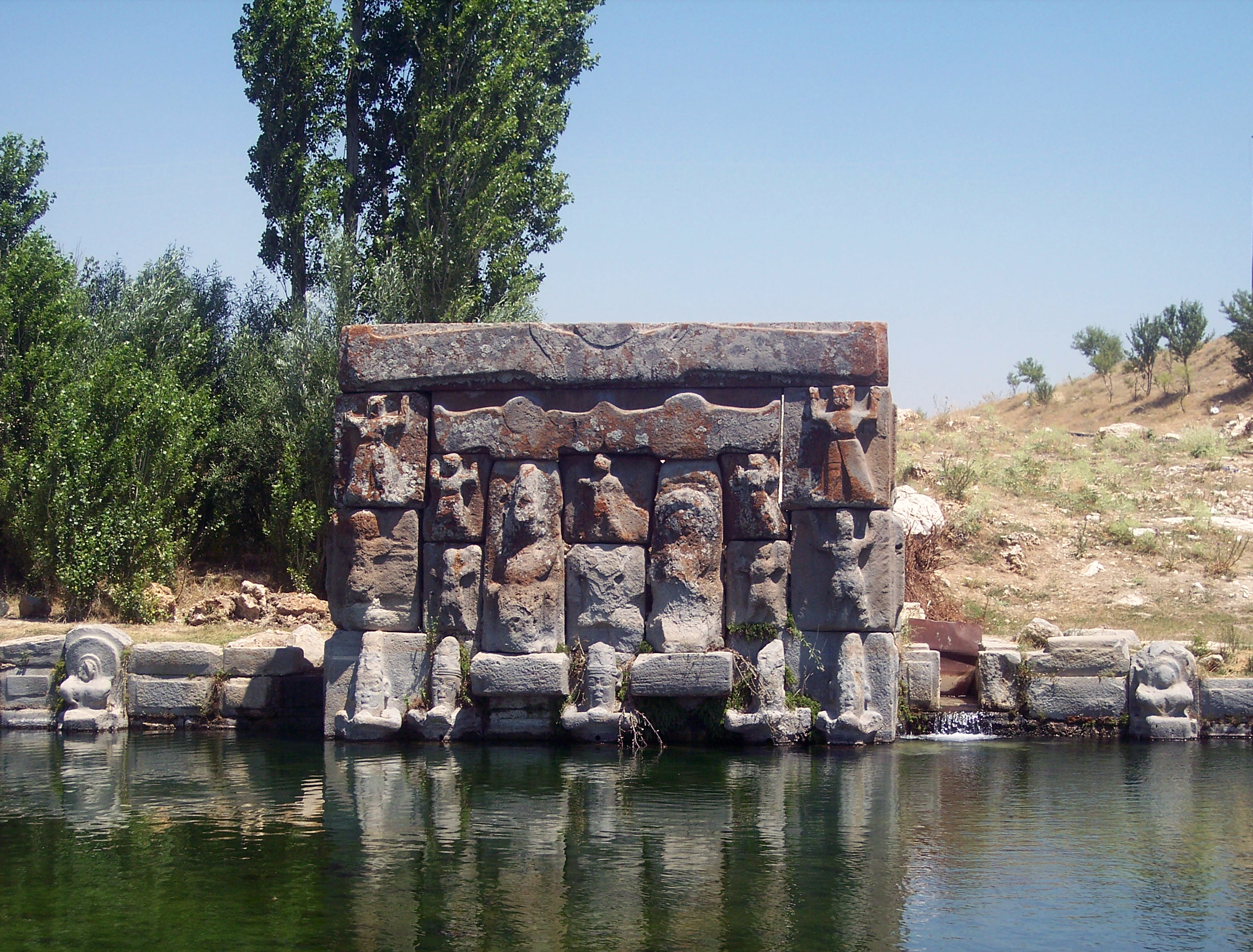
Hittite monument at Eflatun Pınar inside the national park.

Lake Beyşehir National Park (Turkish: Beyşehir Gölü Milli Parkı), established in 1993, is a national park in Konya Province, central Turkey.

== Geography ==
The national park is located within the districts Beyşehir and Hüyük of Konya Province. It is bordered by the Lake Beyşehir in the west, Beyşehir in the south and Hüyük in the north. The national park has an elevation of 1,100 m (3,600 ft). Lake Beyşehir is Turkey's third biggest lake, and the biggest freshwater lake. As of covered area, the national park with 86,855 ha (214,620 acres) was the largestof the country until 2004 when Mount Ararat National Park was established.

== Ecosystem ==
=== Flora ===
The national park habitats 85 families, 305 genera, 545 species, 54 subspecies and 140 varieties within its boundaries. 88 of the 560 taxa in the park area are endemic. Some plants spread in and around the protected area are Turkish cedar, (Cedrus libani), common juniper (Juniperus communis), Phoenicean juniper (Juniperus phoenicea), fir (Abies), pine (Pinus), kermes oak (Quercus coccifera), ash tree (Fraxinus), walnut tree (Juglans), mulberry (Morus), male fern (Dryopteris filix-mas), windflower (Anemone nemorosa), poppy (Papaver somniferum), dyer's madder (Rubia tinctorum), sage (Salvia), snowdrop (Galanthus) and cyclamen.

=== Fauna ===
Lake Beyşehir and its creeks are habitat for 16 freshwater fish species including zander, carp and zarte.

The lake is quite important for water birds. There are 153 bird species in the park area. Bird species such as coot, pelican, heron, grebe, mallard, little grebe and tufted duck are observed on the islets and the shallow banks of the lake.

The area around the lake is also rich in species of amphibians, reptiles and mammals. It is habitat for three amphibian, 14 reptile and 34 mammal species.

== Facilities and recreation ==
The national park offers opportunities for diverse recreational outdoor activities such as trekking, hiking and mountain biking. There is also possibility of boat ride on the lake.

There are picnic areas, off-road park, campgrounds for tent and camper in the park. The park has no lodging facilities. The nearby town Beyşehir provides hotels, motels and hostels to stay.

Best time to perform recreational activities in the national park is between May and October.

== Access ==
State highway D.350 between Konya and Isparta runs through the national park. The park is in a distance of 94 km (58 mi) to Konya, and is 105 km (65 mi) far from Isparta.

== See also ==
- Eflatun Pınar (literally: Plato's Spring) is a historic place inside the national park with a stone-built pool monument from Hittites.
