= Beyşehir =

- District and municipality
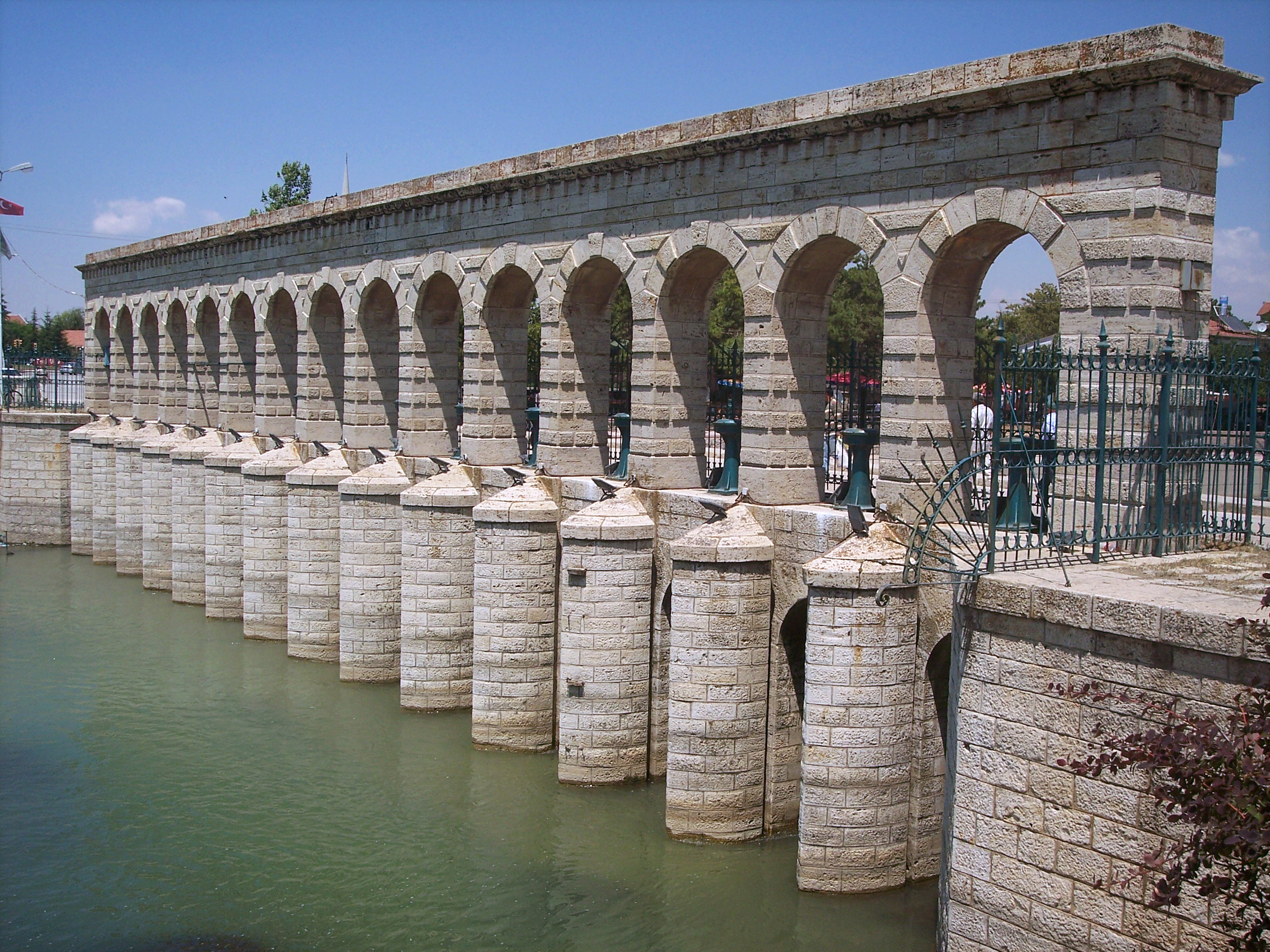
- Taşköprü ("Stone Bridge"), a historical regulator dam and bridge in Beyşehir

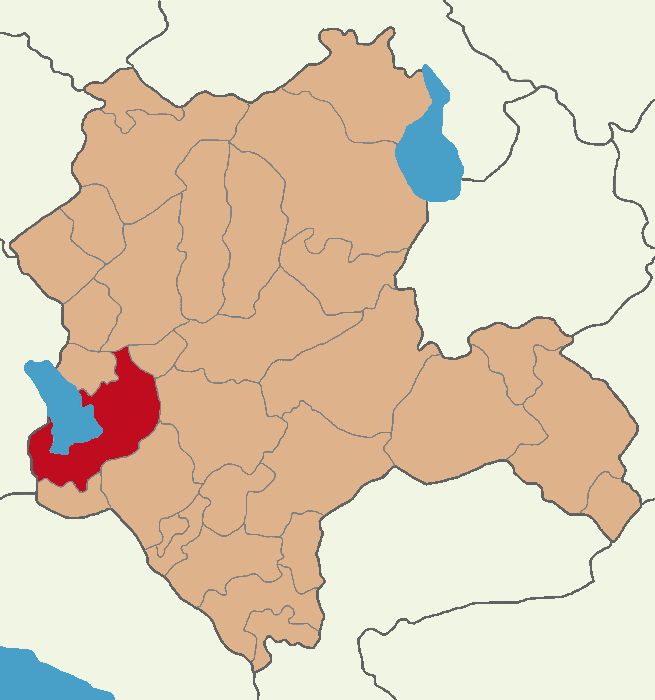
- Map showing Beyşehir District in Konya Province

- Location within Turkey Location within Turkey Central Anatolia
- Coordinates: 37°40′35″N 31°43′34″E
- Country: Turkey
- Province: Konya

Government
  - Mayor: Adil Bayındır
- Area: 2,054 km^{2} (793 sq mi)
- Elevation: 1,150 m (3,770 ft)
- Population (2024): 79,629
  - Density: 38.77/km^{2} (100.4/sq mi)
- Time zone: UTC+3 (TRT)
- Area code: 0332
- Climate: Csa
- Website: Beyşehir Municipality; Beyşehir District Governorate

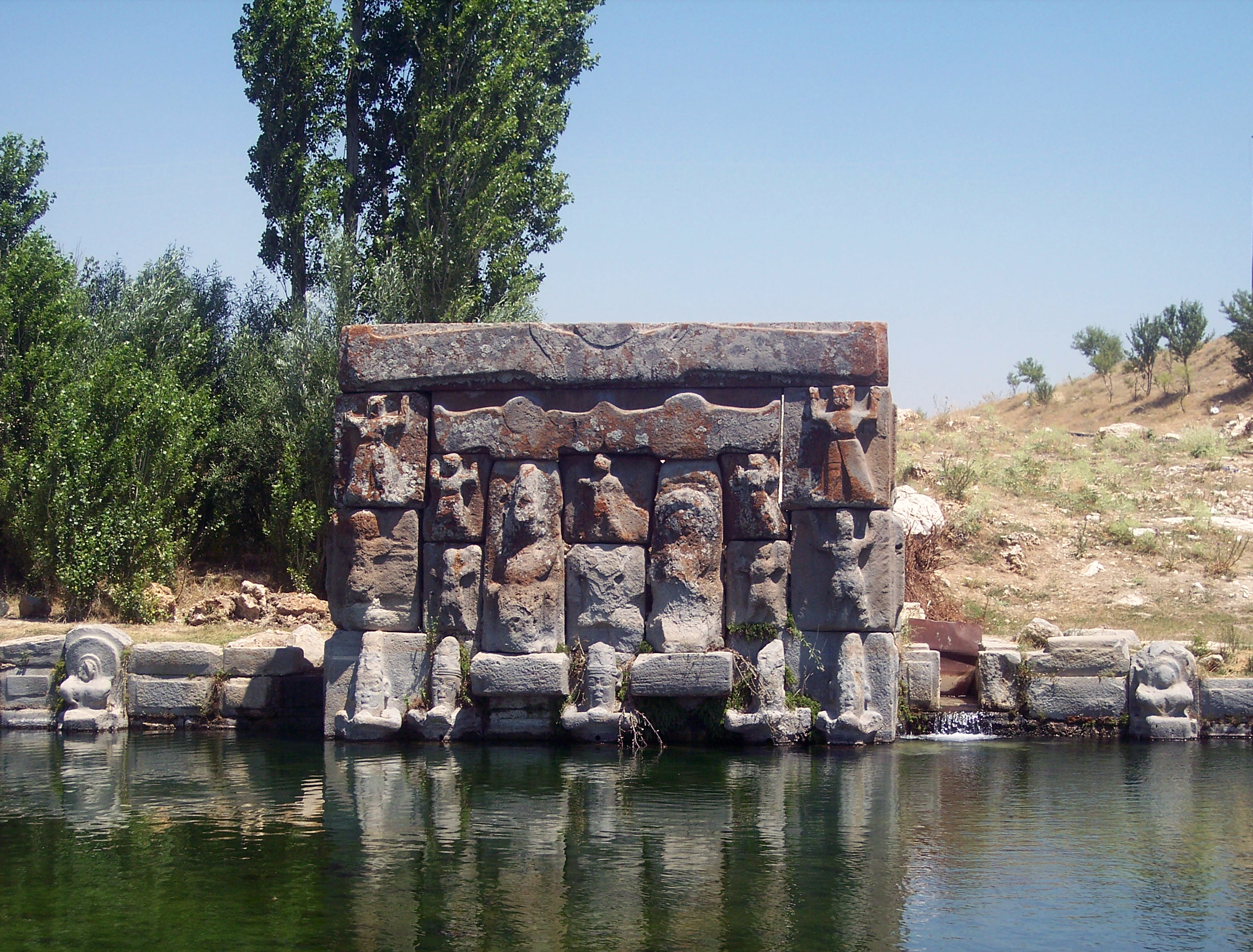
Hittite monument at Eflatun Pınar inside the national park.

Beyşehir (pronounced [ˈbejʃeˌhiɾ]) is a municipality and district of Konya Province, Turkey. Its area is 2,054 km^{2}, and its population is 77,690 (2022). The town is located on the southeastern shore of Lake Beyşehir and is marked to the west and the southwest by the steep lines and forests of the Taurus Mountains, while a fertile plain, an extension of the lake area, extends in the southeastern direction.

== History ==
The Hittite monument situated in Beyşehir's depending locality of Eflatunpınar, at a short distance to the northeast from the town, proves that the Hittite Empire had reached as far as the region, marking in fact, in the light of present knowledge, the limits of their extension to the southwest. Evidence points out that an earlier settlement, perhaps dating back to the Neolithic Age, was also located in Eflatunpınar. Another important early settlement was located in Erbaba Höyük, situated 10 km (6 mi) to the southwest of Beyşehir, and which was explored by the Canadian archaeologists Jacques and Louise Alpes Bordaz in the 1970s, leading to finds from three neolithic building layers.

The Beyşehir region corresponds to classical antiquity's Pisidia. At the location of the town itself there was in all likelihood a Greek city, which in one view was probably named Karallia, which was one of the two urban centers that surrounded the lake at the time, and in Roman times was known as Claudiocaesarea (Greek: Κλαυδιοκαισάρεια, Klaudiokaisareia), and Mistheia (Greek: Μίσθεια) in Byzantine times. Another theory is that Beyşehir's site corresponds to that of Casae (Κἀσαι), the seat of a Christian diocese of the Roman province of Pamphylia, which under Roman rule included large parts of Pisidia. The names of some of its bishops are given in documents concerning church councils held from 381 to 879. No longer a residential bishopric, Casae in Pamphylia is today listed by the Catholic Church as a titular see.

The state of desolation into which the ancient city, whatever it was called, had fallen by the first decades of the 13th century is suggested by the name "Viranşehir" that the Seljuk Turks had given to the town, meaning "the desolate city". The Seljuk Sultans of Rum based in Konya nevertheless built their summer residence nearby, in an agglomeration situated on the southwestern lake shore at a distance of 80 km (50 mi) from Beyşehir city, and which came to be known as Kubadabad Palace. While the most precious finds of Kubadabad site date from the reign of Alaeddin Keykubad (1220–1237), it was a seasonal settlement area chosen by and for the sultans already in the late 12th century.

After the fall of the Seljuks, Viranşehir was renamed for a time as Süleymanşehir in honor of one of the beys of the region's ruling dynasty, the Eshrefids, who made the town into his capital. Since the beys of Eshrefids resided here, the present name of Beyşehir was gradually adopted for the town. The Great Mosque of Beyşehir built by the dynasty between 1296 and 1299, also called Eşrefoğlu Mosque, is considered one of the masterpieces of the intermediate period of Anatolian beyliks between the Seljuk and Ottoman architecture styles.

== Composition ==
There are 67 neighbourhoods in Beyşehir District:

- Adaköy
- Ağılönü
- Akburun
- Avdancık
- Avşar
- Bademli
- Bahçelievler
- Başgöze
- Bayat
- Bayavşar
- Bayındır
- Bektemir
- Beytepe
- Çetmi
- Çiçekler
- Çiftlikköy
- Çivril
- Çukurağıl
- Dalyan
- Damlapınar
- Doğanbey
- Doğancık
- Dumanlı
- Eğirler
- Eğlikler
- Emen
- Esence
- Esentepe
- Evsat
- Fasıllar
- Göçü
- Gökçekuyu
- Gökçimen
- Gölkaşı
- Gölyaka
- Gönen
- Gündoğdu
- Hacıakif
- Hacıarmağan
- Hamidiye
- Huğlu
- Hüseyinler
- İçerişehir
- İsaköy
- Karaali
- Karabayat
- Karadiken
- Karahisar
- Kayabaşı
- Küçükafşar
- Kurucaova
- Kuşluca
- Mesutlar
- Müftü
- Sadıkhacı
- Şamlar
- Sarıköy
- Sevindik
- Üçpınar
- Üstünler
- Üzümlü
- Yazyurdu
- Yeni
- Yenidoğan
- Yeşildağ
- Yukarıesence
- Yunuslar

== Climate ==
Beyşehir has a dry-summer humid continental climate (Köppen: Dsa), bordering on a mediterranean climate (Csa), with very warm, dry summers and cold, snowy winters.

Climate data for Beyşehir (1991–2020)
| Month | Jan | Feb | Mar | Apr | May | Jun | Jul | Aug | Sep | Oct | Nov | Dec | Year |
|---|---|---|---|---|---|---|---|---|---|---|---|---|---|
| Mean daily maximum °C (°F) | 4.2 (39.6) | 6.4 (43.5) | 11.2 (52.2) | 16.3 (61.3) | 21.3 (70.3) | 25.9 (78.6) | 29.6 (85.3) | 29.9 (85.8) | 25.7 (78.3) | 19.6 (67.3) | 12.3 (54.1) | 6.4 (43.5) | 17.4 (63.3) |
| Daily mean °C (°F) | −0.3 (31.5) | 1.1 (34.0) | 5.3 (41.5) | 9.9 (49.8) | 14.6 (58.3) | 18.8 (65.8) | 22.3 (72.1) | 22.3 (72.1) | 18.0 (64.4) | 12.4 (54.3) | 6.0 (42.8) | 1.8 (35.2) | 11.1 (52.0) |
| Mean daily minimum °C (°F) | −4.1 (24.6) | −3.4 (25.9) | 0.0 (32.0) | 3.8 (38.8) | 7.7 (45.9) | 11.4 (52.5) | 14.5 (58.1) | 14.6 (58.3) | 10.3 (50.5) | 6.0 (42.8) | 0.8 (33.4) | −2.0 (28.4) | 5.0 (41.0) |
| Average precipitation mm (inches) | 73.35 (2.89) | 47.12 (1.86) | 50.18 (1.98) | 44.33 (1.75) | 43.65 (1.72) | 31.87 (1.25) | 9.21 (0.36) | 10.1 (0.40) | 19.73 (0.78) | 45.63 (1.80) | 55.11 (2.17) | 81.18 (3.20) | 511.46 (20.14) |
| Average precipitation days (≥ 1.0 mm) | 7.3 | 6.2 | 6.6 | 6.3 | 6.3 | 4.2 | 2.1 | 2.0 | 3.1 | 5.2 | 4.7 | 7.5 | 61.5 |
| Average relative humidity (%) | 77.7 | 72.9 | 66.1 | 62.0 | 61.1 | 57.2 | 49.3 | 50.0 | 54.0 | 64.5 | 72.4 | 78.3 | 63.8 |
Source: NOAA

== Notable people ==
- Suleiman Sirr Koydemir (Beshtoev) — is a well-known political and public figure in Turkey. Graduated from the Faculty of Law of the University of Konya. He served as Mayor of Beysehir. He was awarded the highest award of Turkey "Istiklal Medallion" (Medal of Freedom). Ingush by nationality.
- Makki Sharif Bashtav — The largest Turkish medieval historian and Turkologist, Byzantine scholar and specialist in Hungarian studies, professor. Ingush by nationality.

== See also ==
- Eşrefoğlu Mosque, 13th-century mosque
- Lake Beyşehir, Turkey's third biggest lake, and the biggest freshwater lake.
- Kubadabad Palace
- Eflatun Pınar, a spring with a monument by Hittites inside the nearby Lake Beyşehir National Park.
- Taşköprü, a historic regulator dam and pedestrian bridge
