= Lake Beyşehir =

Lake in Turkey

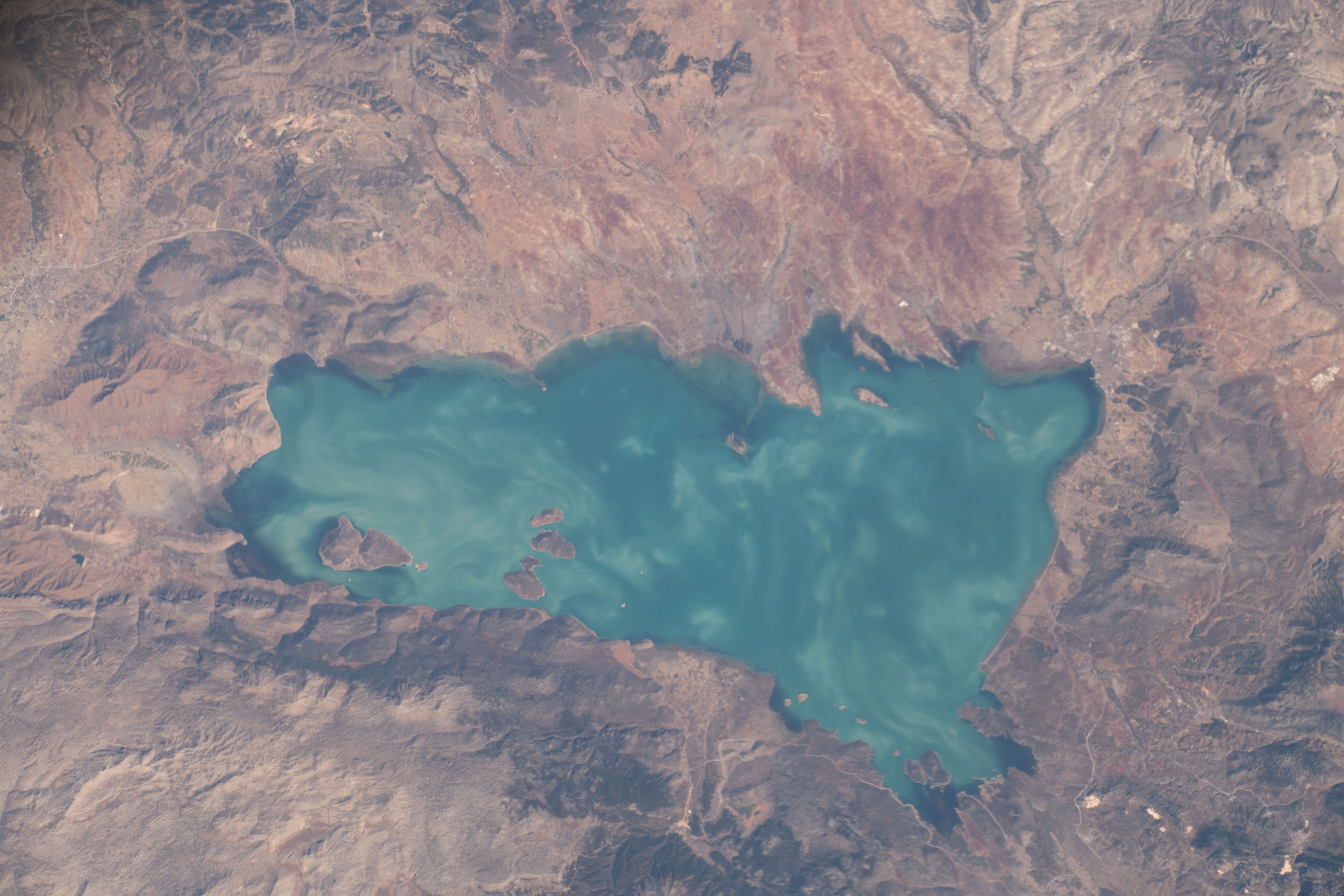
- Satellite image of Lake Beyşehir in 2019

- Location within Turkey
- Coordinates: 37°47′0″N 31°33′0″E
- Basin countries: Turkey
- Max. length: 45 km (28 mi)
- Max. width: 20 km (12 mi)
- Surface area: 650.00 km^{2} (250.97 sq mi)
- Surface elevation: 1,123 m (3,684 ft)

Lake Beyşehir (Turkish: Beyşehir Gölü; anciently, Carallis or Karallis (Ancient Greek: Κάραλλις), or Caralis or Karalis (Κάραλις)) is a large freshwater lake in Isparta and Konya provinces in southwestern Turkey. It is located at around 37°47′0″N 31°33′0″E and is the largest freshwater lake in Turkey. It has an area of 650 km^{2} and is 45 km long and 20 km wide. It carries the same name as the principal urban centre of its region, Beyşehir. Anciently, it was considered part of ancient Isauria.

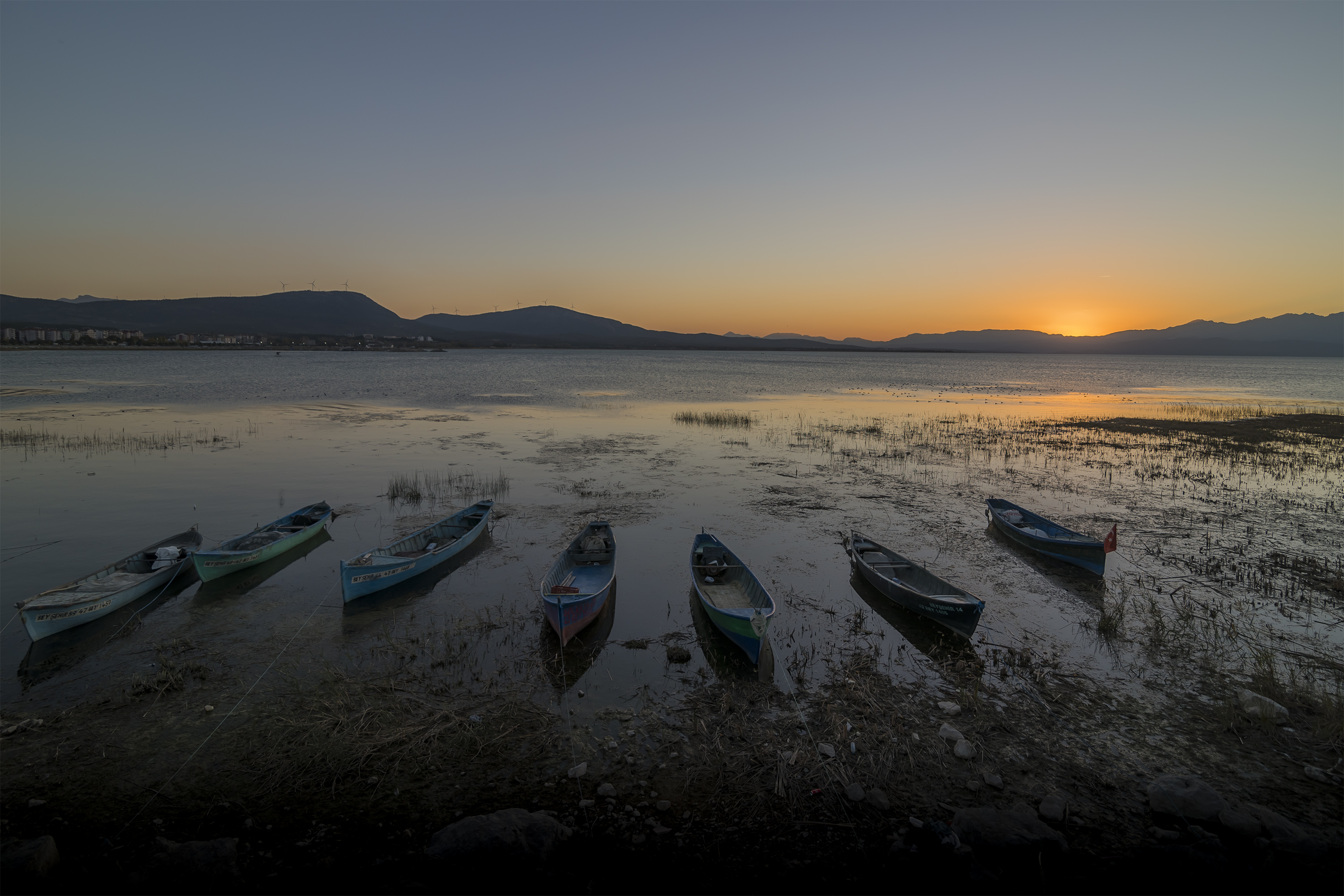
Beyşehir lake and fisher boats.

The lake is fed by streams flowing from the Sultan Mountains and the Anamas Mountains. The water level in the lake often fluctuates by year and by season. Lake Beyşehir is used for irrigation and aquaculture, although it is also a national park. There are thirty-two islets in varying sizes in the lake. Lake Beyşehir is also an important site for many bird species. The maximum depth is 10 metres.

Water in the lake was at its lowest level during the period 1960-1990 in October 1975 at 1121.96 metres, with 64,500 hectares of water surface. The highest water level in the same period was 1125.50 metres in March 1981, with a surface area of 74,600 hectares.

In recent years, the lake has experienced a severe drought, causing its water level to decline and the shoreline to retreat by approximately 300 metres.

== See also ==
- List of lakes in Turkey
- Taşköprü, a historic regulator dam and bridge next to the lake
- Lake Beyşehir National Park
