= List of World Heritage Sites in Europe and North America =

The United Nations Educational, Scientific and Cultural Organization (UNESCO) designates World Heritage Sites of outstanding universal value to cultural or natural heritage which have been nominated by signatories to the 1972 UNESCO World Heritage Convention. Cultural heritage consists of monuments (such as architectural works, monumental sculptures, or inscriptions), groups of buildings, and sites (including archaeological sites). Natural heritage includes natural features (consisting of physical and biological formations), geological and physiographical formations (including habitats of threatened species of animals and plants), and natural sites that are important from the point of view of science, conservation or natural beauty. UNESCO lists sites under ten criteria; each entry must meet at least one of the criteria. Criteria i through vi are cultural, and vii through x are natural. The implementation of the World Heritage Convention, the addition or removal of properties from the World Heritage List, and the allocation of funds, among other responsibilities, are managed by the World Heritage Committee. There are twenty-one state members on the committee. Although a term is a maximum of six years, most state parties choose to relinquish their responsibilities after four years so other countries can have the opportunity to be a member of the committee.

Europe and North America is one of the five regions defined by UNESCO, alongside Africa, the Arab States, Asia and the Pacific, and Latin America and the Caribbean. It consists of 51 nations from Europe and North America that have accepted the World Heritage Convention, making their historical sites eligible for inclusion on the list as World Heritage sites. The region has 591 properties on the World Heritage List. Of those properties, 501 were inscribed for their cultural significance, 77 for their natural significance, and 13 for both their natural and cultural significance–being termed mixed sites. There are currently 7 World Heritage Sites in Europe and North America that are endangered. (Note: The included reference shows 74 natural sites, but it does not include Uvs Nuur Basin, Landscapes of Dauria and Hyrcanian forests, transnational sites which are counted as a part of the Asia and the Pacific region.)

In addition to sites inscribed on the World Heritage List, member states can maintain a list of tentative sites that they may consider for nomination. Nominations for the World Heritage List are only accepted if the site was previously listed on the tentative list. The Europe and North America region has 553 properties on the tentative list.

Location of World Heritage Sites in Europe and North America. Red dots represent cultural sites, green triangles represent natural sites, and blue squares represent mixed sites.

Europe and North America state parties by World Heritage Sites and criteria, tentative listings, and World Heritage Committee service
State	Cultural	Natural	Mixed	Total	Tentative	Service on World Heritage Committee	Date joined	Ref
Albania	2	1	1	4	4	0 times	10 July 1989	
Andorra	1	0	0	1	1	0 times	3 January 1997	
Armenia	3	0	0	3	8	1 time	5 September 1993	
Austria	11	1	0	12	2	0 times	18 December 1992	
Azerbaijan	4	1	0	5	12	2 times	16 December 1993	
Belarus	3	1	0	4	6	0 times	12 October 1988	
Belgium	15	1	0	16	16	2 times	24 July 1996	
Bosnia and Herzegovina	3	2	0	5	9	1 time	12 July 1993	
Bulgaria	7	3	0	10	16	3 times	7 March 1974	
Canada	10	11	1	22	10	4 times	23 July 1976	
Croatia	8	2	0	10	15	1 time	6 July 1992	
Cyprus	3	0	0	3	11	2 times	14 August 1975	
Czechia	16	1	0	17	14	1 time	26 March 1993	
Denmark	8	5	0	13	4	0 times	25 July 1979	
Estonia	2	0	0	2	3	1 time	27 October 1995	
Finland	7	1	0	8	1	2 times	4 March 1987	
France	47	7	2	56	31	5 times	27 June 1975	
Georgia	3	1	0	4	14	0 times	4 November 1992	
Germany	52	3	0	55	11	4 times	23 August 1976	
Greece	18	0	3	21	11	3 times	17 July 1981	
Hungary	7	1	0	8	11	2 times	15 July 1985	
Iceland	1	2	0	3	6	0 times	19 December 1995	
Ireland	2	0	0	2	4	0 times	16 September 1991	
Israel	9	0	0	9	18	1 time	6 October 1999	
Italy	56	6	0	62	30	5 times	23 June 1978	
Latvia	3	0	0	3	3	0 times	10 January 1995	
Lithuania	5	0	0	5	1	1 time	31 March 1992	
Luxembourg	1	0	0	1	0	0 times	28 September 1983	
Malta	3	0	0	3	7	1 time	14 November 1978	
Moldova	1	0	0	1	4	0 times	23 September 2002	
Monaco	0	0	0	0	1	0 times	7 November 1978	
Montenegro	3	1	0	4	6	0 times	3 June 2006	
Netherlands	12	1	0	13	2	1 time	26 August 1992	
North Macedonia	0	1	1	2	4	0 times	30 April 1997	
Norway	7	1	0	8	6	3 times	12 May 1977	
Poland	16	2	0	18	6	3 times	29 June 1976	
Portugal	16	1	0	17	11	2 times	30 September 1980	
Romania	9	2	0	11	19	0 times	16 May 1990	
Russia	22	11	0	33	32	3 times	12 October 1988	
San Marino	1	0	0	1	0	0 times	18 October 1991	
Serbia	5	0	0	5	12	1 time	11 September 2001	
Slovakia	6	2	0	8	12	0 times	31 March 1993	
Slovenia	3	2	0	5	4	0 times	5 November 1992	
Spain	44	4	2	50	35	3 times	4 May 1982	
Sweden	13	1	1	15	1	1 time	22 January 1985	
Switzerland	9	4	0	13	1	3 times	17 September 1975	
Türkiye	20	0	2	22	80	3 times	16 March 1983	
Ukraine	7	1	0	8	17	1 time	12 October 1988	
United Kingdom	29	5	1	35	5	1 time	29 May 1984	
United States of America	13	13	1	27	16	4 times	7 December 1973	
Vatican City	2	0	0	2	0	0 times	7 October 1982	

== Albania ==
=== World Heritage Sites ===
- Butrint
- Historic Centres of Berat and Gjirokastër
- Primeval Beech Forests of the Carpathians and Other Regions of Europe
- Natural and Cultural Heritage of the Ohrid Region

=== Tentative list ===
- Royal Tombs of Selca e Poshtme
- Amphitheatre of Durrës
- The Ancient City of Apollonia
- The Castle of Bashtova

== Andorra ==
=== World Heritage Sites ===
- Madriu-Perafita-Claror Valley

=== Tentative list ===
- The Material Testimonies of the Construction of the Pyrenean State: The Co-principality of Andorra

== Armenia ==
=== World Heritage Sites ===
- Monasteries of Haghpat and Sanahin
- Monastery of Geghard and the Upper Azat Valley
- Cathedral and Churches of Echmiatsin and the Archaeological Site of Zvartnots

=== Tentative list ===
- The archaeological site of the city of Dvin
- The basilica and archaeological site of Yererouk
- The monastery of Noravank and the upper Amaghou Valley
- The monasteries of Tatev and Tatevi Anapat and the adjacent areas of the Vorotan Valley
- Vishaps and the Cultural Landscape of Tirinkatar
- The Archaeological Complex of Garni and the ‘Basalt Organ’ Columnar Joint
- The Urartian Heritage of Yerevan
- Areni-1 (Birds’) Cave: Prehistoric Life and Winemaking in the Arpa River Gorge

== Austria ==
=== World Heritage Sites ===
- Historic Centre of the City of Salzburg
- Palace and Gardens of Schönbrunn
- Hallstatt–Dachstein / Salzkammergut Cultural Landscape
- Semmering railway
- City of Graz – Historic Centre and Schloss Eggenberg
- Wachau Cultural Landscape
- Fertő / Neusiedlersee Cultural Landscape
- Historic Centre of Vienna>"Historic Centre of Vienna". UNESCO World Heritage Centre. Archived from the original on 1 December 2005.</ref>
- Prehistoric pile dwellings around the Alps
- Ancient and Primeval Beech Forests of the Carpathians and Other Regions of Europe
- Frontiers of the Roman Empire – The Danube Limes (Western Segment)
- The Great Spa Towns of Europe

=== Tentative list ===
- Iron Trail with Erzberg and the old town of Steyr
- Großglockner High Alpine Road / Großglockner Hochalpenstraße

== Azerbaijan ==
=== World Heritage Sites ===
- Walled City of Baku with Shirvanshah's Palace and Maiden Tower
- Gobustan Rock Art Cultural Landscape
- Historic Centre of Sheki with the Khan's Palace
- Hyrcanian Forests
- Cultural Landscape of Khinalig People and “Köç Yolu” Transhumance Route

=== Tentative list ===
- Surakhany, Atashgyakh (Fire – worshippers, temple – museum at Surakhany)
- The mausoleum of Nakhichevan
- "Binegadi" 4th Period Fauna and Flora Deposit
- "Lok-Batan" Mud Cone
- "Baku Stage" Mountain
- The Caspian Shore Defensive Constructions
- Susha historical and architectural reserve
- Ordubad historical and architectural reserve
- Prehistoric sites of the Azykh and Taghlar caves
- Khudafarin Bridges and related sites
- Ancient Gabala City
- Gamigaya and Goy-gol Historical-Cultural and Natural Complex

== Belarus ==
=== World Heritage Sites ===
- Białowieża Forest
- Mir Castle Complex
- Struve Geodetic Arc
- Architectural, Residential and Cultural Complex of the Radziwill Family at Nesvizh

=== Tentative list ===
- Augustow Canal
- Saviour Transfiguration Church and St. Sophia Cathedral in the town of Polatsk
- SS. Boris and Gleb (Kalozha) Church in the city of Hrodna
- Edifices for Worship of Fortress Type in Belarus, Poland and Lithuania
- Worship wooden architecture (17th–18th centuries) in Polesye
- Memorials to the Heroes of the Great Patriotic War: Brest Fortress and Mamayev Kurgan

== Belgium ==
=== World Heritage Sites ===
- Flemish Béguinages
- The Four Lifts on the Canal du Centre and their Environs, La Louvière and Le Roeulx (Hainaut)
- La Grand-Place, Brussels
- Belfries of Belgium and France
- Historic Centre of Bruges
- Major Town Houses of the Architect Victor Horta (Brussels)
- Neolithic Flint Mines at Spiennes
- Notre-Dame Cathedral in Tournai
- Plantin-Moretus House-Workshops-Museum Complex
- Stoclet House
- Major Mining Sites of Wallonia
- The Architectural Work of Le Corbusier, an Outstanding Contribution to the Modern Movement
- Ancient and Primeval Beech Forests of the Carpathians and Other Regions of Europe
- The Great Spa Towns of Europe
- Colonies of Benevolence
- Funerary and memory sites of the First World War (Western Front)

=== Tentative list ===
- The historic centre of Ghent and two associated abbeys
- Historical core of Antwerp - from the Scheldt to the former ramparts of around 1250
- University buildings of KU Leuven, the legacy of six centuries within the historic centre
- Royal Saint-Hubert Galleries
- The architectural work of Henry van de Velde
- Palace of Justice
- High Fens
- Roman causeway from Bavay to Tongeren
- Prince-Bishops' Palace
- Battlefield of Waterloo, the End of the Napoleonic Period
- Panorama of the Battle of Waterloo
- Meuse Citadels
- Hoge Kempen Rural - Industrial Transition Landscape
- Neanderthal Fossil Sites in Wallonia
- The Hospital of Our Lady with the Rose, Lessines
- Workers' Assembly Halls

== Bosnia and Herzegovina ==
=== World Heritage Sites ===
- Old Bridge Area of the Old City of Mostar
- Mehmed Paša Sokolović Bridge
- Stećci Medieval Tombstones Graveyards
- Ancient and Primeval Beech Forests of the Carpathians and Other Regions of Europe
- Vjetrenica Cave, Ravno

=== Tentative list ===
- Sarajevo – unique symbol of universal multiculture – continual open city (N.I.)
- The natural and architectural ensemble of Jajce
- The historic urban site of Počitelj
- The natural and architectural ensemble of Blagaj
- The natural and architectural ensemble of Blidinje
- The natural and architectural ensemble of Stolac
- Strict Nature Reserve – Primeval forest "Perućica"
- Jewish Cemetery in Sarajevo
- Complex of travertine waterfalls in Martin Brod - Una National Park

== Bulgaria ==
=== World Heritage Sites ===
- Boyana Church
- Madara Rider
- Thracian Tomb of Kazanlak
- Rock-Hewn Churches of Ivanovo
- Rila Monastery
- Ancient City of Nessebar
- Srebarna Nature Reserve
- Pirin National Park
- Thracian Tomb of Sveshtari
- Ancient and Primeval Beech Forests of the Carpathians and Other Regions of Europe

=== Tentative list ===
- Two neolithic dwellings with their interior and household furnishings and utensils completely preserved
- The Magoura cave with drawings from the Bronze Age
- The ancient town of Nicopolis ad Istrum
- The late ancient tomb of Silistra
- The Bachkovo Monastery
- The town of Melnik and the Rozhen Monastery
- The Roussensky Lom National Park
- The Ancient Plovdiv
- Thracian Tomb with Wall Paintings beside Alexandrovo village
- Vratsa Karst Nature Reserve
- Rocks of Belogradchik
- Central Balkan National Park
- Pobiti Kamani Natural Monument
- The royal necropolis of the Thracian city of Seuthopolis – a serial site, extension of the Kazanlak Thracian tomb
- Bishop's Basilica and Late-Antique Mosaics of Philippopolis, Roman Province of Thrace
- Frontiers of the Roman Empire – The Danube Limes (Bulgaria)

== Canada ==
=== World Heritage Sites ===
- L'Anse aux Meadows National Historic Site
- Nahanni National Park
- Dinosaur Provincial Park
- SG̱ang Gwaay
- Head-Smashed-In Buffalo Jump
- Wood Buffalo National Park
- Canadian Rocky Mountain Parks
- Historic District of Old Québec
- Gros Morne National Park
- Kluane / Wrangell–St. Elias / Glacier Bay / Tatshenshini-Alsek
- Waterton-Glacier International Peace Park
- Old Town Lunenburg
- Miguasha National Park
- Rideau Canal
- Joggins Fossil Cliffs
- Landscape of Grand Pré
- Red Bay Basque Whaling Station
- Mistaken Point
- Pimachiowin Aki
- Writing-on-Stone / Áísínai’pi
- Tr’ondëk-Klondike
- Anticosti

=== Tentative list ===
- Gwaii Haanas
- Ivvavik / Vuntut / Herschel Island (Qikiqtaruk)
- Quttinirpaaq
- Hecate Strait and Queen Charlotte Sound Glass Sponge Reefs Marine Protected Area
- Qajartalik
- Sirmilik National Park and Tallurutiup Imanga (proposed) National Marine Conservation Area
- Stein Valley
- Wanuskewin
- Yukon Ice Patches
- Transatlantic Cable Ensemble (Canada)

== Croatia ==
=== World Heritage Sites ===
- Plitvice Lakes National Park
- Historical Complex of Diocletian's Palace
- Old City of Dubrovnik
- Episcopal Complex of the Euphrasian Basilica in the Historic Centre of Poreč
- Historic city of Trogir
- Cathedral of St. James
- Stari Grad Plain
- Stećci Medieval Tombstones Graveyards
- Venetian Works of defence between 15th and 17th centuries
- Primeval Beech Forests of the Carpathians and Other Regions of Europe

=== Tentative list ===
- Zadar – Episcopal complex
- Historical-town planning ensemble of Ston with Mali Ston, connecting walls, the Mali Ston Bay nature reserve, Stonsko Polje and the salt pans
- Historical-Town Planning Ensemble of Tvrđa (Fort) in Osijek
- Varaždin - Historic Nucleus and Old Town (the Castle)
- Burg - Castle of Veliki Tabor
- Lonjsko Polje Nature Park
- Velebit Mountain
- Diocletian's Palace and the Historical Nucleus of Split (extension)
- Lubenice
- Primošten Vineyards
- Blaca hermitage
- City of Motovun
- The historic town of Korčula
- Kornati National Park and Telašćica Nature Park
- Frontiers of the Roman Empire – The Danube Limes (Croatia)

== Cyprus ==
=== World Heritage Sites ===
- Paphos
- Painted Churches in the Troodos Region
- Choirokoitia

=== Tentative list ===
- Church of Panayia Chrysokourdaliotissa, Kourdali (extension to Painted Churches in the Troodos Region)
- The rural settlement of Fikardou
- Mathiatis South
- Kionia (Note: This is a part of the Troodos Ophiolite.)
- Khandria
- Troodos, Mt. Olympus
- Malounta Bridge
- Klirou Bridge
- Agioi Varnavas and Ilarion at Peristerona (Five-domed churches)
- Church of Panagia Aggeloktisti
- Hala Sultan Tekke and the Larnaka Salt Lake Complex

== Czechia ==
=== World Heritage Sites ===
- Historic Centre of Prague
- Historic Centre of Český Krumlov
- Historic Centre of Telč
- Pilgrimage Church of St John of Nepomuk at Zelená Hora
- Kutná Hora: Historical Town Centre with the Church of St Barbara and the Cathedral of Our Lady at Sedlec
- Lednice–Valtice Cultural Landscape
- Gardens and Castle at Kroměříž
- Holašovice Historical Village Reservation
- Litomyšl Castle
- Holy Trinity Column in Olomouc
- Tugendhat Villa in Brno
- Jewish Quarter and St Procopius' Basilica in Třebíč
- Erzgebirge/Krušnohoří Mining Region
- Landscape for Breeding and Training of Ceremonial Carriage Horses at Kladruby nad Labem
- Ancient and Primeval Beech Forests of the Carpathians and Other Regions of Europe
- The Great Spa Towns of Europe
- Žatec and the Landscape of Saaz Hops

=== Tentative list ===
- Renaissance Houses at Slavonice
- Fishpond Network in the Třeboň Basin
- Český ráj (Czech Paradise) Rock Cities
- Sites of Great Moravia: Slavonic Fortified Settlement at Mikulčice – Church of St. Margaret at Kopčany
- The Industrial Complexes at Ostrava
- The Fortress of Terezín
- The Spa at Luhačovice
- The Betlém Rock Sculptures near Kuks
- Karlštejn Castle
- Extension of the World Heritage Site "Historic Centre of Prague" with the important Monuments in its Vicinity
- Mountain-top Hotel and Television Transmitter Ještěd
- Old Wastewater Treatment Plant in Prague-Bubeneč
- European Paper Mills (from the era of hand-made paper)
- Punkevní Caves with the Macocha Abyss and Kateřinská Cave

== Denmark ==
=== World Heritage Sites ===
- Jelling Mounds, Runic Stones and Church
- Roskilde Cathedral
- Kronborg Castle
- Ilulissat Icefjord
- Stevns Klint
- Wadden Sea
- Moravian Church Settlements
- The par force hunting landscape in North Zealand
- Kujataa Greenland: Norse and Inuit Farming at the Edge of the Ice Cap
- Aasivissuit – Nipisat: Inuit Hunting Ground between Ice and Sea
- Viking Age Ring Fortresses
- Møns Klint
- The Bony Fish Fossils of the Western Limfjord – Evolution and Climate Adaptation in the Earliest Eocene

=== Tentative list ===
- Amalienborg and its district
- The Maritime Heritage of Dragør Old Town and Harbour - A ‘skipper-town’ from the era of the great tall ships in the 18th and 19th centuries
- Seaweed Houses and Sea-salt Huts, Laesoe Island
- Workers’ Assembly Halls (Denmark)

== Estonia ==
=== World Heritage Sites ===
- Historic Centre (Old Town) of Tallinn
- Struve Geodetic Arc

=== Tentative list ===
- Kuressaare Fortress
- Baltic Klint
- Wooded meadows (Laelatu, Kalli-Nedrema, Mäepea, Allika, Tagamõisa, Loode, Koiva, Halliste)

== Finland ==
=== World Heritage Sites ===
- Old Rauma
- Fortress of Suomenlinna
- Petäjävesi Old Church
- Verla Groundwood and Board Mill
- Bronze Age Burial Site of Sammallahdenmäki
- Struve Geodetic Arc
- High Coast / Kvarken Archipelago
- Aalto Works

=== Tentative list ===
- The Ringed Seal Archipelagos of Lake Saimaa

== France ==
=== World Heritage Sites ===
- Mont-Saint-Michel and its Bay
- Chartres Cathedral
- Palace and Park of Versailles
- Vézelay, Church and Hill
- Prehistoric Sites and Decorated Caves of the Vézère Valley
- Palace and Park of Fontainebleau
- Amiens Cathedral
- Roman Theatre and its Surroundings and the "Triumphal Arch" of Orange
- Arles, Roman and Romanesque Monuments
- Cistercian Abbey of Fontenay
- From the Great Saltworks of Salins-les-Bains to the Royal Saltworks of Arc-et-Senans, the Production of Open-pan Salt
- Abbey Church of Saint-Savin-sur-Gartempe
- Place Stanislas, Place de la Carrière, and Place d'Alliance in Nancy
- Gulf of Porto: Calanche of Piana, Gulf of Girolata, Scandola Reserve
- Pont du Gard (Roman Aqueduct)
- Strasbourg, Grande-Île and Neustadt
- Cathedral of Notre-Dame, Former Abbey of Saint-Remi, and Palace of Tau, Reims
- Paris, Banks of the Seine
- Bourges Cathedral
- Historical centre of Avignon: Papal Palace, Episcopal Ensemble and Avignon Bridge
- Canal du Midi
- Historic Fortified City of Carcassonne
- Historic site of Lyon
- Routes of Santiago de Compostela in France
- Pyrénées – Mont Perdu
- Jurisdiction of Saint-Émilion
- The Loire Valley between Sully-sur-Loire and Chalonnes
- Provins, Town of Medieval Fairs
- Belfries of Belgium and France
- Le Havre, the City Rebuilt by Auguste Perret
- Bordeaux, Port of the Moon
- Lagoons of New Caledonia: Reef Diversity and Associated Ecosystems
- Fortifications of Vauban
- Episcopal City of Albi
- The Pitons, Cirques and Remparts of Réunion Island
- The Causses and the Cévennes, Mediterranean agro-pastoral Cultural Landscape
- Prehistoric pile dwellings around the Alps<ref
- Nord-Pas de Calais Mining Basin
- Decorated Cave of Pont d’Arc, known as Grotte Chauvet-Pont d’Arc, Ardèche
- The Climats, terroirs of Burgundy
- Champagne Hillsides, Houses and Cellars
- The Architectural Work of Le Corbusier, an Outstanding Contribution to the Modern Movement
- Taputapuātea
- Chaîne des Puys – Limagne fault tectonic arena
- French Austral Lands and Seas
- The Great Spa Towns of Europe
- Cordouan Lighthouse
- Nice, Winter Resort Town of the Riviera
- Ancient and Primeval Beech Forests of the Carpathians and Other Regions of Europe
- Funerary and memory sites of the First World War (Western Front)
- The Maison Carrée of Nîmes
- Volcanoes and Forests of Mount Pelée and the Pitons of Northern Martinique
- Te Henua Enata – The Marquesas Islands
- Megaliths of Carnac and of the shores of Morbihan
- Beaches of the D-Day Landings, Normandy, 1944
- Royal Capetian Fortresses of Languedoc

=== Tentative list ===
- Basilica of Saint-Denis
- Rouen : half-timbered urban complex, Rouen Cathedral, Saint-Ouen Abbey, Church of Saint-Maclou
- Vaux-le-Vicomte
- The fortified towns of the Netherlands in northwestern Europe
- Montagne Sainte-Victoire and Cézanne sites
- Stalactite Caves in Southern France
- Vanoise National Park
- Mont Blanc massif
- Camargue
- Strait of Bonifacio
- Écrins National Park
- Port-Cros National Park
- Salt marshes of Guérande
- The Mediterranean shore of the Pyrenees
- Marseille harbour
- The ancient cities of Narbonnaise and their territory: Nîmes, Arles, Glanum, aqueducts, Via Domitia
- Ligne de Cerdagne
- National Office for Aerospace Studies and Research, Meudon
- Hangar Y
- Menier Chocolate Factory
- Sarlat-la-Canéda
- Rochefort Arsenal and Fortifications on the Charente Estuary
- Royal and Imperial Metz, power issues, stylistic confrontations and urban identity
- Mediterranean Alps
- Charolais-Brionnais, cultural landscape of cattle farming
- Domaine de Fontainebleau: Palace, Gardens, Park, and Forest
- The material testimonies of the construction of the State of the Pyrenees: the Co-Principality of Andorra (France)
- Lérins Abbey
- The Pic du Midi de Bigorre observatory, pioneer in high mountains
- Extension to the existing World Heritage Property "Ancient and Primeval Beech Forests of the Carpathians and Other Regions of Europe" (France)
- Parish closes of Finistère

== Georgia ==
=== World Heritage Sites ===
- Historical Monuments of Mtskheta
- Gelati Monastery
- Upper Svaneti
- Colchic Rainforests and Wetlands

=== Tentative list ===
- Alaverdi Cathedral
- Ananuri
- David Gareji Monasteries and Hermitage
- Dmanisi Hominid Archaeological Site
- Gremi Church of Archangels and Royal Tower
- Kvetera Church
- Mta-Tusheti
- Nikortsminda Cathedral
- Samtavisi Cathedral
- Shatili
- Tbilisi Historic District
- Uplistsikhe Cave Town
- Vani
- Vardzia-Khertvisi

== Germany ==
=== World Heritage Sites ===
- Aachen Cathedral
- Speyer Cathedral
- Würzburg Residence with the Court Gardens and Residence Square
- Pilgrimage Church of Wies
- Castles of Augustusburg and Falkenlust at Brühl
- St Mary's Cathedral and St Michael's Church at Hildesheim
- Roman Monuments, Cathedral of St Peter and Church of Our Lady in Trier
- Hanseatic City of Lübeck
- Palaces and Parks of Potsdam and Berlin
- Abbey and Altenmünster of Lorsch
- Mines of Rammelsberg, Historic Town of Goslar and Upper Harz Water Management System
- Maulbronn Monastery Complex
- Town of Bamberg
- Collegiate Church, Castle, and Old Town of Quedlinburg
- Völklingen Ironworks
- Messel Pit Fossil Site
- Bauhaus and its Sites in Weimar, Dessau and Bernau
- Cologne Cathedral
- Luther Memorials in Eisleben and Wittenberg
- Classical Weimar
- Museumsinsel (Museum Island), Berlin
- Wartburg Castle
- Garden Kingdom of Dessau-Wörlitz
- Monastic Island of Reichenau
- Zollverein Coal Mine Industrial Complex
- Upper Middle Rhine Valley
- Historic Centres of Stralsund and Wismar
- Town Hall and Roland on the Marketplace of Bremen
- Muskauer Park / Park Mużakowski
- Frontiers of the Roman Empire
- Old Town of Regensburg with Stadtamhof
- Berlin Modernism Housing Estates
- The Wadden Sea
- Ancient and Primeval Beech Forests of the Carpathians and Other Regions of Europe
- Prehistoric Pile dwellings around the Alps
- Fagus Factory in Alfeld
- Margravial Opera House Bayreuth
- Bergpark Wilhelmshöhe
- Carolingian Westwork and Civitas Corvey
- Speicherstadt and Kontorhaus District with Chilehaus
- The Architectural Work of Le Corbusier, an Outstanding Contribution to the Modern Movement
- Caves and Ice Age Art in the Swabian Jura
- Naumburg Cathedral
- Archaeological Border complex of Hedeby and the Danevirke
- Erzgebirge/Krušnohoří Mining Region
- Water Management System of Augsburg
- The Great Spa Towns of Europe
- Frontiers of the Roman Empire – The Danube Limes (Western Segment)
- Mathildenhöhe Darmstadt
- Frontiers of the Roman Empire – The Lower German Limes
- ShUM Sites of Speyer, Worms and Mainz
- Jewish-Medieval Heritage of Erfurt
- Moravian Church Settlements
- Residence Ensemble Schwerin – Cultural Landscape of Romantic Historicism
- The Palaces of King Ludwig II of Bavaria: Neuschwanstein, Linderhof, Schachen and Herrenchiemsee

=== Tentative list ===
- Francke Foundation Buildings
- The Jewish Cemetery of Altona Königstraße. Sephardic Sepulchral Culture of the 17th and 18th century between Europe and the Caribbean
- Alpine and pre-alpine meadow and marsh landscapes (historic anthropogenic landscapes in the area of "Werdenfelser Land", "Ammergau", "Staffelseegebiet" and "Murnauer Moos", district Garmisch-Partenkirchen)
- Torgau Castle Chapel
- Green Belt
- Olympic Park Munich
- Pretzien Weir
- Site of the Schöningen Spears – Humans and hunting 300,000 years ago
- The Television Tower Stuttgart. Archetype and symbol of modern mass communication
- European Paper Mills (from the era of hand-made paper)
- Celtic centres of power of the Early Iron Age north of the Alps

== Greece ==
=== World Heritage Sites ===
- Temple of Apollo Epicurius at Bassae
- Archeological site of Delphi
- Acropolis, Athens
- Mount Athos
- Meteora
- Paleochristian and Byzantine monuments of Thessaloniki
- Sanctuary of Asklepios at Epidaurus
- Medieval City of Rhodes
- Archeological site of Mystras
- Archeological site of Olympia
- Delos
- Monasteries of Daphni, Hosios Loukas and Nea Moni of Chios
- Pythagoreion and Heraion of Samos
- Archaeological Site of Aigai (modern name Vergina)
- Archaeological site of Mycenae and Tiryns
- The Historic Centre (Chorá) with the Monastery of Saint-John the Theologian and the Cave of the Apocalypse on the Island of Pátmos
- Old Town of Corfu
- Archaeological Site of Philippi
- Zagori Cultural Landscape
- Minoan Palatial Centres
- The wider area of Mount Olympus

=== Tentative list ===
- Late Medieval Bastioned Fortifications in Greece
- National Park of Dadia – Lefkimi – Souflion
- Ancient Lavrion
- Petrified Forest of Lesvos
- Archaeological site of Ancient Messene
- Archaeological site of Nikopolis
- The area of the Prespa Lakes: Megali and Mikri Prespa which includes Byzantine and post-Byzantine monuments
- Gorge of Samaria National Park
- Fortress of Spinalonga
- Ancient Towers of the Aegean Sea
- Ancient Greek Theatres

== Hungary ==
=== World Heritage Sites ===
- Budapest, including the Banks of the Danube, the Buda Castle Quarter and Andrássy Avenue
- Old Village of Hollókő and its Surroundings
- Caves of Aggtelek Karst and Slovak Karst
- Millenary Benedictine Abbey of Pannonhalma and its Natural Environment
- Hortobágy National Park – the Puszta
- Early Christian Necropolis of Pécs (Sopianae)
- Fertö / Neusiedlersee Cultural Landscape
- Tokaj Wine Region Historic Cultural Landscape

=== Tentative list ===
- Le Château-fort médiéval d'Esztergom
- Caves of the Buda Thermal Karst System
- System of Fortifications at the Confluence of the Rivers Danube and Váh in Komárno – Komárom
- State Stud-Farm Estate of Mezőhegyes
- The Ipolytarnóc Fossils
- Ödön Lechner's independent pre-modern architecture
- Frontiers of the Roman Empire – Ripa Pannonica in Hungary
- The Network of Rural Heritage Buildings in Hungary
- Royal Seats in Esztergom, Visegrád with the former Royal Wood in the Pilis Mountain
- Wooden bell-towers in the Upper Tisza-Region
- Balaton Uplands Cultural Landscape

== Iceland ==
=== World Heritage Sites ===
- Þingvellir National Park
- Surtsey
- Vatnajökull National Park – Dynamic Nature of Fire and Ice

=== Tentative list ===
- Breiðafjörður Nature Reserve
- Mývatn and Laxá
- Viking monuments and sites / Þingvellir National Park
- Þingvellir National Park
- The Turf House Tradition
- Torfajökull Volcanic System / Fjallabak Nature Reserve

== Ireland ==
=== World Heritage Sites ===
- Brú na Bóinne – Archaeological Ensemble of the Bend of the Boyne
- Sceilg Mhichíl

=== Tentative list ===
- The Royal Sites of Ireland: Cashel, Dún Ailinne, Hill of Uisneach, Rathcroghan Complex, and Tara Complex
- Transatlantic Cable Ensemble
- The Passage Tomb Landscape of County Sligo
- The Historic Astronomical Observatories of Ireland

== Israel ==
=== World Heritage Sites ===
- Bahá’i Holy Places in Haifa and the Western Galilee
- Biblical Tels: Megiddo, Hazor, Be’er Sheva
- Incense Route – Desert Cities in the Negev
- Masada
- Old City of Acre
- White City of Tel Aviv—the Modern Movement
- Sites of Human Evolution at Mount Carmel: The Nahal Me’arot / Wadi el-Mughara Caves
- Caves of Maresha and Beit Guvrin in the Judean Lowlands as a Microcosm of the Land of the Caves
- Necropolis of Beit She’arim: A Landmark of Jewish Renewal

=== Tentative list ===
- Triple-arch Gate at Dan & Sources of the Jordan
- Early Synagogues in the Galilee
- The Galilee Journeys of Jesus & the Apostles
- Sea of Galilee & its Ancient Sites
- Horvat Minnim
- Arbel (Arbel, Nabi Shu'ayb, Horns of Hattin)
- Degania & Nahalal
- Beit She'an
- Caesarea
- White Mosque in Ramle
- Jerusalem (extension)
- Makhteshim Country
- Mount Karkom
- Timna
- The Crusader Fortresses
- The Great Rift Valley – migratory routes – The Hula
- Lifta (Mey Naftoah) – Traditional mountain village
- Ein Kerem, a village and its cultural landscape

== Italy ==
=== World Heritage Sites ===
- Rock Drawings in Valcamonica
- Historic Centre of Rome, the Properties of the Holy See in that City Enjoying Extraterritorial Rights and San Paolo Fuori le Mura
- Church and Dominican Convent of Santa Maria delle Grazie with "The Last Supper" by Leonardo da Vinci
- Historic Centre of Florence
- Venice and its Lagoon
- Piazza del Duomo, Pisa
- Historic Centre of San Gimignano
- The Sassi and the Park of the Rupestrian Churches of Matera
- City of Vicenza and the Palladian Villas of the Veneto
- Historic Centre of Siena
- Historic Centre of Naples
- Crespi d'Adda
- Ferrara, City of the Renaissance, and its Po Delta
- Castel del Monte
- The Trulli of Alberobello
- Early Christian Monuments of Ravenna
- Historic Centre of the City of Pienza
- 18th-Century Royal Palace at Caserta with the Park, the Aqueduct of Vanvitelli, and the San Leucio Complex
- Residences of the Royal House of Savoy
- Botanical Garden (Orto Botanico), Padua
- Portovenere, Cinque Terre, and the Islands (Palmaria, Tino and Tinetto)
- Cathedral, Torre Civica and Piazza Grande, Modena
- Archaeological Areas of Pompei, Herculaneum and Torre Annunziata
- Amalfi Coast (Costiera Amalfitana)
- Archaeological Area of Agrigento
- Villa Romana del Casale
- Su Nuraxi di Barumini
- Archaeological Area and the Patriarchal Basilica of Aquileia
- Historic Centre of Urbino
- Cilento and Vallo di Diano National Park with the Archeological sites of Paestum and Velia, and the Certosa di Padula
- Villa Adriana, Tivoli
- City of Verona
- Isole Eolie (Aeolian Islands)
- Assisi, the Basilica of San Francesco and Other Franciscan Sites
- Villa d'Este, Tivoli
- Late Baroque Towns of the Val di Noto (South-Eastern Sicily)
- Sacri Monti of Piedmont and Lombardy
- Val d'Orcia
- Etruscan Necropolises of Cerveteri and Tarquinia
- Syracuse and the Rocky Necropolis of Pantalica
- Genoa: Le Strade Nuove and the system of the Palazzi dei Rolli
- Rhaetian Railway in the Albula / Bernina Landscapes
- Mantua and Sabbioneta
- The Dolomites
- Monte San Giorgio
- Longobards in Italy. Places of the power (568-774 A.D.)
- Prehistoric Pile dwellings around the Alps
- Medici Villas and Gardens in Tuscany
- Mount Etna
- Vineyard Landscape of Piedmont: Langhe-Roero and Monferrato
- Arab-Norman Palermo and the Cathedral Churches of Cefalù and Monreale
- Ancient and Primeval Beech Forests of the Carpathians and Other Regions of Europe
- Venetian Works of Defence between the 16th and 17th centuries: Stato da Terra – Western Stato da Mar
- Ivrea, Industrial City of the 20th Century
- The Prosecco Hills of Conegliano and Valdobbiadene. ("Le Colline del Prosecco di Conegliano e Valdobbiadene")
- The Great Spa Towns of Europe
- Padua's fourteenth-century fresco cycles
- The Porticoes of Bologna
- Evaporitic Karst and Caves of Northern Apennines
- Via Appia. Regina Viarum
- Funerary Tradition in the Prehistory of Sardinia – The domus de janas
- The system of Italian-style condominio theatres of the 18th and 19th centuries in Central Italy

=== Tentative list ===
- Lake Maggiore and Lake D'Orta lakelands
- Hanbury botanical gardens
- Orvieto
- Villas of the Papal Nobility
- Salento and the "Barocco Leccese"
- Cattolica Monastery in Stilo and Basilian-Byzantine complexes
- Archipelago of La Maddalena and Islands of Bocche di Bonifacio
- Mothia Island and Lilibeo: The Phoenician-Punic Civilization in Italy
- Bradyseism in the Flegrea Area
- Cascata delle Marmore and Valnerina: Monastic sites and ancient hydrogeological reclamation works
- Pelagos: The Cetacean Sanctuary
- Island of Asinara
- Sulcis Iglesiente
- The Marble Basin of Carrara
- The Transhumance: The Royal Shepherd's Track
- Volterra: Historical City and Cultural Landscape
- The Aniene valley and Villa Gregoriana in Tivoli
- The Murge of Altamura
- Karstic caves in prehistoric Apulia
- Citadel of Alessandria
- Mont Blanc massif
- The cultural landscape of the Benedictine settlements in medieval Italy
- Mediterranean Alps
- The Cultural Landscape of Civita di Bagnoregio
- Via Francigena in Italy
- Eocene Marine Biodiversity of the Alpone Valley
- Nuragic monuments of Sardinia
- The system of the Ville-fattoria in Chianti Classico
- Evidence of Italo-Greek Culture between the Early and Late Middle Ages
- Extension to the existing World Heritage Property "Ancient and Primeval Beech Forests of the Carpathians and Other Regions of Europe"

== Latvia ==
=== World Heritage Sites ===
- Historic Centre of Riga
- Struve Geodetic Arc
- Old town of Kuldīga

=== Tentative list ===
- Meanders of the Upper Daugava
- Grobiņa archaeological ensemble
- Rundāle Palace Ensemble with a Garden and Forest Park

== Lithuania ==
=== World Heritage Sites ===
- Vilnius Historic Centre
- Curonian Spit
- Kernavė Archaeological Site (Cultural Reserve of Kernavė)
- Struve Geodetic Arc
- Modernist Kaunas: Architecture of Optimism, 1919–1939

=== Tentative list ===
- Trakai Historical National Park

== Luxembourg ==
=== World Heritage Sites ===
- City of Luxembourg: its Old Quarters and Fortifications

=== Tentative list ===
As of 2026, Luxembourg does not maintain any sites on its tentative list.

== Malta ==
=== World Heritage Sites ===
- Ħal Saflieni Hypogeum
- City of Valletta
- Megalithic Temples of Malta

=== Tentative list ===
- Coastal Cliffs
- Qawra/Dwejra
- Cittadella (Victoria – Gozo)
- Knights' Fortifications around the Harbours of Malta
- Mdina (Città Vecchia)
- Maltese Catacomb Complexes
- Victoria Lines Fortifications

== Moldova ==
=== World Heritage Sites ===
- Struve Geodetic Arc

=== Tentative list ===
- The Typical Chernozem Soils of the Bălți Steppe
- Orheiul Vechi Archaeological Landscape
- The Underground Wineries of Moldova (Cricova and Mileștii Mici)
- Cucuteni-Trypillia Civilization

== Monaco ==
=== World Heritage Sites ===
As of 2026, Monaco does not have any sites inscribed on the World Heritage List.

=== Tentative list ===
- Les Alpes de la Méditerranée (Monaco)

== Montenegro ==
=== World Heritage Sites ===
- Natural and Culturo-Historical Region of Kotor
- Durmitor National Park
- Stećci Medieval Tombstones Graveyards
- Venetian Works of Defence between the 16th and 17th centuries: Stato da Terra – Western Stato da Mar

=== Tentative list ===
- Cetinje Historic Core
- Old Town of Bar
- Doclea
- Biogradska Gora National Park
- Ulcinj Old town
- Extension to the existing World Heritage Property "Ancient and Primeval Beech Forests of the Carpathians and Other Regions of Europe"

== Netherlands ==
=== World Heritage Sites ===
- Schokland and Surroundings
- Dutch Water Defence Lines
- Mill Network at Kinderdijk-Elshout
- Historic Area of Willemstad, Inner City and Harbour, Curaçao
- Wouda pumping station
- Droogmakerij de Beemster (Beemster Polder)
- Rietveld Schröder House
- The Wadden Sea
- Seventeenth-century canal ring area of Amsterdam inside the Singelgracht
- Van Nelle Factory
- Colonies of Benevolence
- Frontiers of the Roman Empire – The Lower German Limes
- Eisinga Planetarium in Franeker

=== Tentative list ===
- Bonaire Marine Park
- Plantations in West Curaçao

== North Macedonia ==
=== World Heritage Sites ===
- Natural and Cultural Heritage of the Ohrid region
- Ancient and Primeval Beech Forests of the Carpathians and Other Regions of Europe

=== Tentative list ===
- Cave Slatinski Izvor
- Markovi Kuli
- Archaeo-astronomical Site Kokino
- Church St. George (Sv Gjorgji) Kurbinovo

== Norway ==
=== World Heritage Sites ===
- Urnes Stave Church
- Bryggen
- Røros Mining Town and the Circumference
- Rock carvings at Alta
- Vegaøyan – The Vega Archipelago
- Struve Geodetic Arc
- West Norwegian Fjords – Geirangerfjord and Nærøyfjord
- Rjukan–Notodden Industrial Heritage Site

=== Tentative list ===
- The Laponian Area – Tysfjorden, the fjord of Hellemobotn and Rago (extension)
- The Lofoten islands
- Svalbard Archipelago
- Islands of Jan Mayen and Bouvet as parts of a serial transnational nomination of the Mid-Atlantic Ridge system
- Viking Monuments and Sites / Vestfold Ship Burials and Hyllestad Quernstone Quarries
- Várjjat Siida

== Poland ==
=== World Heritage Sites ===
- Historic Centre of Kraków
- Wieliczka and Bochnia Royal Salt Mines
- Auschwitz Birkenau, German Nazi Concentration and Extermination Camp (1940–1945) (Note: The site was originally listed as "Auschwitz Concentration Camp", but upon Poland's request renamed as "Auschwitz Birkenau" with the subtitle of "German Nazi Concentration and Extermination Camp (1940–1945)")
- Białowieża Forest
- Historic Centre of Warsaw
- Old City of Zamość
- Castle of the Teutonic Order in Malbork
- Medieval Town of Toruń
- Kalwaria Zebrzydowska: the Mannerist Architectural and Park Landscape Complex and Pilgrimage Park
- Churches of Peace in Jawor and Świdnica
- Wooden Churches of Southern Lesser Poland
- Muskauer Park / Park Mużakowski
- Centennial Hall in Wrocław
- Wooden Tserkvas of the Carpathian Region in Poland and Ukraine
- Tarnowskie Góry Lead-Silver-Zinc Mine and its Underground Water Management System
- Krzemionki Prehistoric Striped Flint Mining Region
- Ancient and Primeval Beech Forests of the Carpathians and Other Regions of Europe
- Gdynia Modernist City Centre

=== Tentative list ===
- The Dunajec River Gorge in the Pieniny Mountains
- Historical coal-mining complex in Zabrze (eighteenth–twentieth centuries)
- Bóbrka oil field – the heritage of the beginnings of the oil industry in the world
- The early modern Srebrna Góra Fortress as a perfect example of mountain massifs transformation
- Historic Saltworks Complex in Ciechocinek
- European Paper Mills (from the era of hand-made paper)

== Portugal ==
=== World Heritage Sites ===
- Central Zone of the Town of Angra do Heroismo in the Azores
- Monastery of the Hieronymites and Tower of Belém in Lisbon
- Monastery of Batalha
- Convent of Christ in Tomar
- Historic Centre of Évora
- Monastery of Alcobaça
- Cultural Landscape of Sintra
- Historic Centre of Oporto, Luiz I Bridge and Monastery of Serra do Pilar
- Prehistoric Rock Art Sites in the Côa Valley and Siega Verde
- Laurisilva of Madeira
- Historic Centre of Guimarães and Couros Zone
- Alto Douro Wine Region
- Landscape of the Pico Island Vineyard Culture
- Garrison Border Town of Elvas and its Fortifications
- University of Coimbra – Alta and Sofia
- Royal Building of Mafra – Palace, Basilica, Convent, Cerco Garden and Hunting Park (Tapada)
- Sanctuary of Bom Jesus do Monte in Braga

=== Tentative list ===
- Mértola
- Vila Viçosa, Renaissance ducal town
- Selvagens Islands
- Bulwarked Fortifications of the "Raia" (Border)
- Águas Livres Aqueduct
- Ensemble of Álvaro Siza's Architecture Works in Portugal
- Pombaline Lisbon
- Desert of the Discalced Carmelites and Built Ensemble of the Palace-Hotel in Bussaco
- Head Office and Garden of the Calouste Gulbenkian Foundation
- levadas of Madeira Island
- Mid-Atlantic Ridge

== Romania ==
=== World Heritage Sites ===
- Danube Delta
- Villages with Fortified Churches in Transylvania
- Monastery of Horezu
- Churches of Moldavia
- Historic Centre of Sighișoara
- Wooden churches of Maramureș
- Dacian Fortresses of the Orăștie Mountains
- Ancient and Primeval Beech Forests of the Carpathians and Other Regions of Europe
- Roșia Montană Mining Cultural Landscape
- Sculptural Ensemble of Constantin Brâncuși at Târgu Jiu>
- Frontiers of the Roman Empire — Dacia

=== Tentative list ===
- Byzantine and Post-Byzantine Churches in Curtea de Argeș
- Rupestral Ensemble from Basarabi
- Cule from Oltenia
- Densuș Church
- Historic Town of Alba Iulia
- Retezat Massif
- Pietrosul Rodnei mountain peak
- Sânpetru Formation
- The Historic Centre of Sibiu and its Ensemble of Squares
- The old villages of Hollókő and Rimetea and their surroundings
- Frontiers of the Roman Empire — The Danube Limes (Romania)
- Former Communist Prisons in Romania
- Movile Cave
- Princely religious foundations in Wallachia and Moldavia
- Royal Residences of Sinaia
- Cucuteni-Trypillia Civilization
- Vânători Neamț Monastic Landscape
- Coliboaia Cave
- Extension to the existing World Heritage Property "Ancient and Primeval Beech Forests of the Carpathians and Other Regions of Europe"

== Russia ==
=== World Heritage Sites ===
- Historic Centre of Saint Petersburg and Related Groups of Monuments
- Kizhi Pogost
- Kremlin and Red Square, Moscow
- Historic Monuments of Novgorod and Surroundings
- Cultural and Historic Ensemble of the Solovetsky Islands
- White Monuments of Vladimir and Suzdal
- Architectural Ensemble of the Trinity Sergius Lavra in Sergiev Posad
- Church of the Ascension, Kolomenskoye
- Virgin Komi Forests
- Lake Baikal
- Volcanoes of Kamchatka
- Golden Mountains of Altai
- Historic and Architectural Complex of the Kazan Kremlin
- Western Caucasus
- Ensemble of the Ferapontov Monastery
- Curonian Spit
- Central Sikhote-Alin
- Uvs Nuur Basin
- Citadel, Ancient City and Fortress Buildings of Derbent
- Natural System of Wrangel Island Reserve
- Ensemble of the Novodevichy Convent
- Historical Centre of the City of Yaroslavl
- Struve Geodetic Arc
- Putorana Plateau
- Lena Pillars Nature Park
- Bolgar Historical and Archaeological Complex
- Landscapes of Dauria
- Assumption Cathedral and Monastery of the town-island of Sviyazhsk
- Churches of the Pskov School of Architecture
- Petroglyphs of Lake Onega and the White Sea
- Astronomical Observatories of Kazan Federal University
- Cultural Landscape of Kenozero Lake
- Rock Paintings of Shulgan-Tash Cave

=== Tentative list ===
- Historical and Cultural Dzheyrakh-Assa Reservation
- Historic Centre of Irkutsk
- Rostov Kremlin
- Historic Center of Yeniseysk
- Petroglyphs of Sikachi-Alyan
- The Commander Islands (Comandorsky State Nature Reserve)
- Magadansky State Nature Reserve
- Krasnoyarsk Stolby
- The Great Vasyugan Mire
- Ensemble of the Astrakhan Kremlin
- The Ilmensky mountains
- The archeological site of Tanais
- Bashkir Ural
- Virgin Komi Forests (re-nomination)
- Western Caucasus (re-nomination)
- Mamayev Kurgan Memorial Complex "To the Heroes of the Battle of Stalingrad"
- The Oglakhty Range
- Historic Centre of Gorokhovets
- Treasures of the Pazyryk Culture
- Cathedral of the Transfiguration of the Savior with the Medieval Rampart City Wall of Pereslavl-Zalessky (1152–1157)
- Heritage of Chukotka Arctic Marine Hunters
- Vyatskoe village
- Divnogorye Historical and Cultural Complex
- National Park Kytalyk
- Valley of the Kings of Tuva
- Denisova Cave
- Bashkir Shikhans: Toratau, Yuraktau and Kushtau
- Historic Town Centre of Torzhok and Country Estate Properties Designed by Nikolay Lvov
- The Complex of the Voskresensky Copper Smeltery
- Memorials to the Heroes of the Great Patriotic War: Brest Fortress and Mamayev Kurgan
- Complex of Structures of the Tsoi-Pede Necropolis
- Exhibition of Achievements of National Economy (VDNKh), Moscow

== San Marino ==
=== World Heritage Sites ===
- San Marino Historic Centre and Monte Titano

=== Tentative list ===
As of 2026, San Marino does not maintain any sites on its tentative list.

== Serbia ==
=== World Heritage Sites ===
- Stari Ras and Sopoćani
- Studenica Monastery
- Medieval Monuments in Kosovo
- Gamzigrad-Romuliana, Palace of Galerius
- Stećci Medieval Tombstones Graveyards

=== Tentative list ===
- Djerdap National Park
- The Deliblato Sands Special Natural Reserve
- Mt. Sara National Park
- The Tara National Park with the Drina River Canyon
- The Đavolja Varoš ("Devil's Town") Natural Landmark
- Fortified Manasija Monastery
- Negotinske Pivnice
- Smederevo Fortress
- Caričin Grad – Iustiniana Prima, archaeological site
- Cultural landscape of Bač and its surroundings
- Frontiers of the Roman Empire – The Danube Limes
- Extension to the existing World Heritage Property "Ancient and Primeval Beech Forests of the Carpathians and Other Regions of Europe"

== Slovakia ==
=== World Heritage Sites ===
- Historic Town of Banská Štiavnica and the Technical Monuments in its Vicinity
- Levoča, Spišský Hrad and the Associated Cultural Monuments
- Vlkolínec
- Caves of Aggtelek Karst and Slovak Karst
- Bardejov Town Conservation Reserve
- Ancient and Primeval Beech Forests of the Carpathians and Other Regions of Europe
- Wooden Churches of the Slovak part of the Carpathian Mountain Area
- Frontiers of the Roman Empire – The Danube Limes (Western Segment)

=== Tentative list ===
- Gemer and Abov churches with the medieval wall paintings
- Tokaj Wine Region
- Original Meadow – Pasture Sites of Slovakia
- The Memorial of Chatam Sófer
- System of Fortifications at the Confluence of the Rivers Danube and Váh in Komárno – Komárom
- The concept of the lenticular historical town core of Košice City
- Natural Reserves of Tatras Mountain
- Karst Valleys of Slovakia
- Natural and Cultural Landscape of Danube Region
- Fungal Flora of Bukovské Hills
- Herľany geyser
- Sites of Great Moravia: Slavonic Fortified Settlement at Mikulčice – Church of St. Margaret at Kopčany

== Slovenia ==
=== World Heritage Sites ===
- Škocjan Caves
- Prehistoric pile dwellings around the Alps
- Heritage of Mercury. Almadén and Idrija
- Ancient and Primeval Beech Forests of the Carpathians and Other Regions of Europe
- The works of Jože Plečnik in Ljubljana – Human Centred Urban Design

=== Tentative list ===
- Fužina hills in Bohinj
- Franja Partisan Hospital
- Classic Karst (in Slovene language: Klasicni kras)
- The Walk of Peace from the Alps to the Adriatic – Heritage of the First World War

== Spain ==
=== World Heritage Sites ===
- Alhambra, Generalife and Albayzín
- Burgos Cathedral
- Monastery and Site of the Escorial
- Works of Antoni Gaudí
- Cave of Altamira and Paleolithic Cave Art of Northern Spain
- Old Town of Segovia and its Aqueduct
- Monuments of Oviedo and the Kingdom of the Asturias
- Santiago de Compostela (Old Town)
- Old Town of Ávila with its Extra-Muros Churches
- Mudéjar Architecture of Aragon
- Historic City of Toledo
- Garajonay National Park
- Old Town of Cáceres
- Cathedral, Alcázar and Archivo de Indias in Seville
- Old City of Salamanca
- Poblet Monastery
- Archaeological Ensemble of Mérida
- Royal Monastery of Santa María de Guadalupe
- Routes of Santiago de Compostela: Camino Francés and Routes of Northern Spain
- Doñana National Park
- Historic Walled Town of Cuenca
- La Lonja de la Seda de Valencia
- Pyrénées - Mont Perdu
- Las Médulas
- Palau de la Música Catalana and Hospital de Sant Pau, Barcelona
- San Millán Yuso and Suso Monasteries
- Rock Art of the Mediterranean Basin on the Iberian Peninsula
- University and Historic Precinct of Alcalá de Henares
- Ibiza, Biodiversity and Culture
- San Cristóbal de La Laguna
- Archaeological Ensemble of Tárraco
- Palmeral of Elche
- Roman Walls of Lugo
- Catalan Romanesque Churches of the Vall de Boí
- Archaeological Site of Atapuerca
- Aranjuez Cultural Landscape
- Renaissance Monumental Ensembles of Úbeda and Baeza
- Vizcaya Bridge
- Teide National Park
- Tower of Hercules
- Prehistoric Rock Art Sites in the Côa Valley and Siega Verde
- Cultural Landscape of the Serra de Tramuntana
- Heritage of Mercury. Almadén and Idrija
- Antequera Dolmens Site
- Ancient and Primeval Beech Forests of the Carpathians and Other Regions of Europe
- Caliphate City of Medina Azahara
- Risco Caído and the sacred mountains of Gran Canaria Cultural Landscape
- Paseo del Prado and Buen Retiro, a landscape of Arts and Sciences
- Talayotic Menorca

=== Tentative list ===
- Romanesque Cultural Enclave in the North of Castile-León and the South of Cantabria The Church of Saint Martin of Tours in Frómista is pictured.
- Bulwarked Frontier Fortifications
- The Silver Route
- Mediterranean Windmills
- Greek Archaeological ensemble in Empúries, l'Escala, Girona
- The Ribeira Sacra, Lugo and Ourense
- The Mediterranean Facet of the Pyrenees (France-Spain)
- Mesta Livestock Trails
- Roman Ways. Itineraries of the Roman Empire
- Ancares – Somiedo
- Loarre Castle
- El Ferrol of the Illustration Historical Heritage
- Mining Historical Heritage
- Plasencia - Monfragüe - Trujillo: Mediterranean landscape
- Jaén Cathedral (extension of the Renaissance Monumental Ensembles of Úbeda and Baeza)
- Valle Salado de Añana
- La Rioja and Rioja Alavesa Vine and Wine Cultural Landscape
- Priorat-Montsant-Siurana agricultural landscape of the Mediterranean mountain
- The Portal of the Ripoll Monastery
- Turó de la Seu Vella de Lleida
- Monastery of Santa María de La Rábida and the Columbus Memorial Places in Huelva
- Church of San Salvador de Valdediós
- The Olive Grove Landscapes of Andalusia
- The Wine in Iberia
- Cíes Islands–Atlantic Islands of Galicia National Park
- The Hadrianic city of Italica
- Group of Mozarabic buildings on the Iberian Peninsula
- The Episcopal See of Egara and its pictorial decoration (5th-8th centuries)
- Les témoignages matériels de la construction de l’État des Pyrénées : la |Co-principauté d’Andorre
- Sigüenza and Atienza Sweet and Salty Landscape
- Carmona’s cultural landscape
- European Paper Mills (from the era of hand-made paper)
- The Geode of Pulpí
- Universidad Laboral de Gijón/Xixón
- Rock engravings on the island of La Palma

== Sweden ==
=== World Heritage Sites ===
- Royal Domain of Drottningholm
- Birka and Hovgården
- Engelsberg Ironworks
- Rock Carvings in Tanum
- Skogskyrkogården
- Hanseatic Town of Visby
- Church Town of Gammelstad, Luleå
- Laponian Area
- Naval Port of Karlskrona
- Agricultural Landscape of Southern Öland
- High Coast / Kvarken Archipelago
- Mining Area of the Great Copper Mountain in Falun
- Grimeton Radio Station, Varberg
- Struve Geodetic Arc
- Decorated Farmhouses of Hälsingland

=== Tentative list ===
- The Rise of Systematic Biology

== Switzerland ==
=== World Heritage Sites ===
- Old City of Berne
- Convent of St Gall
- Benedictine Convent of St John at Müstair
- Three Castles, Defensive Wall and Ramparts of the Market-Town of Bellinzona
- Swiss Alps Jungfrau-Aletsch
- Monte San Giorgio
- Lavaux, Vineyard Terraces
- Rhaetian Railway in the Albula / Bernina Landscapes
- Swiss Tectonic Arena Sardona
- La Chaux-de-Fonds / Le Locle, Watchmaking Town Planning
- Prehistoric pile dwellings around the Alps
- The Architectural Work of Le Corbusier, an Outstanding Contribution to the Modern Movement
- Ancient and Primeval Beech Forests of the Carpathians and Other Regions of Europe

=== Tentative list ===
- Salginatobel Bridge

== Türkiye ==
=== World Heritage Sites ===
- Göreme National Park and the Rock Sites of Cappadocia
- Great Mosque and Hospital of Divriği
- Historic Areas of Istanbul
- Hattusa: the Hittite Capital
- Mount Nemrut
- Hierapolis-Pamukkale
- Xanthos-Letoon
- City of Safranbolu
- Archaeological Site of Troy
- Selimiye Mosque and its Social Complex
- Neolithic Site of Çatalhöyük
- Pergamon and its Multi-Layered Cultural Landscape
- Bursa and Cumalıkızık: the Birth of the Ottoman Empire
- Diyarbakır Fortress and Hevsel Gardens Cultural Landscape
- Ephesus
- Archaeological Site of Ani
- Aphrodisias
- Göbekli Tepe
- Arslantepe Mound
- Gordion
- Wooden Hypostyle Mosques of Medieval Anatolia
- Sardis and the Lydian Tumuli of Bin Tepe

=== Tentative list ===
- Karain Cave
- Sümela Monastery (The Monastery of Virgin Mary)
- Alahan Monastery
- St. Nicholas Church
- Harran and Şanlıurfa
- The Tombstones of Ahlat the Urartian and Ottoman citadel
- Seljuk Caravanserais on the Route from Denizli to Doğubeyazıt
- Konya – A Capital of Seljuk Civilization
- Alanya
- Mardin Cultural Landscape
- St. Paul's Church, Saint Paul's Well and surrounding historic quarters
- Ishak Pasha Palace
- Kekova
- Güllük Dagi–Termessos National Park
- Ancient Cities of Lycian Civilization
- Archaeological Site of Sagalassos
- Archaeological Site of Perga
- St. Pierre Church, Hatay
- Aizanoi Antique City
- Archaeological Site of Zeugma
- Historic Town of Birgi
- Mausoleum and Sacred Area of Hecatomnus
- Medieval City of Beçin
- Historical Monuments of Niğde
- Yesemek Quarry and Sculpture Workshop
- Odunpazarı Historical Urban Site
- Mamure Castle
- Haci Bektash Veli Complex
- Archaeological Site of Laodicea
- Lake Tuz
- İznik
- Zeynel Abidin Mosque Complex and Mor Yakup Church
- Tomb of Ahi Evren
- Vespasianus Titus Tunnel
- Archaeological site of Kültepe–Kaneş
- Ancient City of Kaunos
- Anatolian Seljuks Madrasahs (Note: This includes the following madarasas: İnce Minareli Medrese, Karatay Medrese, Çifte Minareli Medrese, Yakutiye Medrese, Buruciye Medrese, Çifte Minareli Medrese, Gök Medrese, Sahabiye Medrese, Çifte Medrese and Cacabey Medrese.)
- Ancient City of Korykos
- Ancient City of Anazarbus
- Çanakkale (Dardanelles) and Gelibolu (Gallipoli) Battles Zones in the First World War
- Eflatun Pınar: The Hittite Spring Sanctuary
- Akdamar Church
- The Theatre and Aqueducts of the Ancient City of Aspendos
- Eshab-ı Kehf Kulliye
- Historic Guild Town of Mudurnu
- Mount Harşena and the Rock‑tombs of the Pontic Kings
- Mountainous Phrygia
- Ancient City of Stratonikeia
- The Bridge of Uzunköprü
- İsmail Fakirullah Tomb and its Light Refraction Mechanism
- Yıldız Palace Complex
- The Malabadi Bridge
- Tushpa/Van Fortress, the Mound and the Old City of Van
- Sultan Bayezid II Complex: A Center of Medical Treatment
- Yivli Minaret Mosque
- The Bodrum Castle
- Nuruosmaniye Complex
- Ancient City of Kibyra
- Hacı Bayram Mosque and Surrounding Area (the Haci Bayram District)
- Kızılırmak Delta Wetland and Bird Sanctuary
- Archaeological Site of Assos
- Ayvalık Industrial Landscape
- Ivriz Cultural Landscape
- Early Period of Anatolian Turkish Heritage: Niksar, The Capital of Danishmend Dynasty
- The Underground Water Structures in Gaziantep; Livas' and Kastels
- Bridge of Justinian
- Archaeological Site of Priene
- Historic City of Harput
- Basilica Therma
- Nature Park of Ballıca Cave
- Historic Town of Beypazarı
- Karatepe‑Aslantaş Archaeological Site
- The Historical Port City of İzmir
- Zerzevan Castle and Mithraeum
- Koramaz Valley
- Late Antique and Medieval Churches and Monasteries of Midyat and Surrounding Area (Tur Abdin)
- Historic Town of Kemaliye
- Ankara: The Planning and Building of a Republican Modern Capital City
- Middle East Technical University Campus: A Living Modern Cultural Landscape
- The Genoese Maritime Network: Trading Posts and Fortifications from the Mediterranean to the Black Sea

== Ukraine ==
=== World Heritage Sites ===
- Kyiv: Saint-Sophia Cathedral and Related Monastic Buildings, Kyiv-Pechersk Lavra
- L'viv – the Ensemble of the Historic Centre
- Struve Geodetic Arc
- Ancient and Primeval Beech Forests of the Carpathians and Other Regions of Europe
- Residence of Bukovinian and Dalmatian Metropolitans
- Ancient City of Tauric Chersonese and its Chora
- Wooden Tserkvas of the Carpathian Region in Poland and Ukraine
- The Historic Centre of Odesa

=== Tentative list ===
- Historic Centre of Tchernigov, 9th—13th centuries
- Cultural Landscape of Canyon in Kamenets-Podilsk
- Tarass Shevtchenko Tomb and State Historical and Natural Museum - Reserve
- National Steppe Biosphere Reserve "Askaniya Nowa"
- Dendrological Park "Sofijivka"
- Bagçesaray Palace of the Crimean Khans
- Archaeological Site "Stone Tomb"
- Mykolayiv Astronomical Observatory
- Complex of the Sudak Fortress Monuments of the 6th – 16th c.
- Astronomical Observatories of Ukraine
- Kyiv: Saint Sophia Cathedral with Related Monastic Buildings, St. Cyril's and St. Andrew's Churches, Kyiv-Pechersk Lavra (extension of Kyiv: Saint-Sophia Cathedral and Related Monastic Buildings, Kyiv-Pechersk Lavra)
- Trading Posts and Fortifications on Genoese Trade Routes. From the Mediterranean to the Black Sea
- Cultural Landscape of "Cave Towns" of the Crimean Gothia
- The historical surroundings of Crimean Khans' capital in Bakhchysarai
- Derzhprom (the State Industry Building)
- Tyras - Bilhorod (Akkerman), on the way from the Black Sea to the Baltic Sea
- Cucuteni-Trypillia Civilization

== United Kingdom ==
=== World Heritage Sites ===
- Giant's Causeway and Causeway Coast
- Durham Castle and Cathedral
- Ironbridge Gorge
- Studley Royal Park including the Ruins of Fountains Abbey
- Stonehenge, Avebury and Associated Sites
- Castles and Town Walls of King Edward in Gwynedd
- St Kilda
- Blenheim Palace
- Palace of Westminster and Westminster Abbey including Saint Margaret's Church
- City of Bath (Note: Bath is also listed as part of the transnational serial site The Great Spa Towns of Europe.)
- Frontiers of the Roman Empire
- Henderson Island
- Tower of London
- Canterbury Cathedral, St Augustine's Abbey, and St Martin's Church
- Old and New Towns of Edinburgh
- Gough and Inaccessible Islands
- Maritime Greenwich
- Heart of Neolithic Orkney
- Historic Town of St George and Related Fortifications, Bermuda
- Blaenavon Industrial Landscape
- New Lanark
- Saltaire
- Dorset and East Devon Coast
- Derwent Valley Mills
- Royal Botanic Gardens, Kew
- Cornwall and West Devon Mining Landscape
- Pontcysyllte Aqueduct and Canal
- The Forth Bridge
- Gorham's Cave Complex
- The English Lake District
- Jodrell Bank Observatory
- The Great Spa Towns of Europe
- The Slate Landscape of Northwest Wales
- The Flow Country
- Moravian Church Settlements

=== Tentative list ===
- City of York: historic urban core
- Birkenhead Park, the pioneering People's Park
- East Atlantic Flyway: England East Coast Wetlands
- Little Cayman Marine Parks and Protected Areas
- Mousa, Old Scatness and Jarlshof: the Zenith of Iron Age Shetland

== United States of America ==
=== World Heritage Sites ===
- Mesa Verde National Park
- Yellowstone National Park
- Kluane / Wrangell–St. Elias / Glacier Bay / Tatshenshini-Alsek
- Grand Canyon National Park
- Everglades National Park
- Independence Hall
- Redwood National and State Parks
- Mammoth Cave National Park
- Olympic National Park
- Cahokia
- Great Smoky Mountains National Park
- La Fortaleza and San Juan National Historic Site in Puerto Rico
- Statue of Liberty
- Yosemite National Park
- Chaco Culture
- Hawaii Volcanoes National Park
- Monticello and the University of Virginia in Charlottesville
- Taos Pueblo
- Carlsbad Caverns National Park
- Waterton-Glacier International Peace Park
- Papahānaumokuākea
- Monumental Earthworks of Poverty Point
- San Antonio Missions
- The 20th-Century Architecture of Frank Lloyd Wright
- Hopewell Ceremonial Earthworks
- Moravian Church Settlements
- Okefenokee National Wildlife Refuge

=== Tentative list ===
- Civil Rights Movement Sites
- Dayton Aviation Sites
- Thomas Jefferson Buildings
- Mount Vernon
- Serpent Mound
- Petrified Forest National Park
- White Sands National Park
- Brooklyn Bridge
- Ellis Island
- Central Park
- Early Chicago Skyscrapers
- Pacific Remote Islands Marine National Monument
- California Current Conservation Complex
- Marianas Trench Marine National Monument
- Marine Protected Areas of American Samoa
- Big Bend National Park

== Vatican City ==
=== World Heritage Sites ===
- Vatican City
- Historic Centre of Rome, the Properties of the Holy See in that City Enjoying Extraterritorial Rights and San Paolo Fuori le Mura

=== Tentative list ===
As of 2026, the Vatican City does not maintain any sites on its tentative list.
