= List of World Heritage Sites in Turkey =

Location of World Heritage Sites in Turkey. Red dots represent cultural sites and blue dots represent mixed sites. Purple dots indicate the mosques of the Wooden Hypostyle Mosques, a cultural site.

The United Nations Educational, Scientific and Cultural Organization (UNESCO) World Heritage Sites are places of importance to cultural or natural heritage as described in the UNESCO World Heritage Convention, established in 1972. Cultural heritage consists of monuments (such as architectural works, monumental sculptures, or inscriptions), groups of buildings, and sites (including archaeological sites). Natural features (consisting of physical and biological formations), geological and physiographical formations (including habitats of threatened species of animals and plants), and natural sites which are important from the point of view of science, conservation or natural beauty, are defined as natural heritage. Turkey accepted the convention on March 16, 1983.

There are 22 World Heritage Sites in Turkey, of which 20 are cultural and 2 are mixed, listed for both cultural and natural values. The first sites to be inscribed were Göreme National Park and the Rock Sites of Cappadocia; the Great Mosque and Hospital of Divriği; and the Historic Areas of Istanbul, all at the 9th Session of the World Heritage Committee in 1985. The latest inscription, Sardis and the Lydian Tumuli of Bin Tepe, was added to the list in 2025. In addition, Turkey has 80 sites on its tentative list.

== World Heritage Sites ==
UNESCO lists sites under ten criteria; each entry must meet at least one of the criteria. Criteria i through vi are cultural, and vii through x are natural.

World Heritage Sites
Site	Image	Location (province)	Year listed	UNESCO data	Description
Göreme National Park and the Rock Sites of Cappadocia		Kayseri and Nevşehir Provinces	1985	357; i, iii, v, vii (mixed)	The Göreme Valley area is famous for its striking hoodoo rock formations. The region of Cappadocia also features a gallery of rock-hewn dwellings, villages, churches, underground cities, and great examples of post-Iconoclastic Byzantine art.
Great Mosque and Hospital of Divriği		Sivas	1985	358; i, iv (cultural)	Founded in the early 13th century, the mosque-hospital complex at Divriği is a unique and outstanding example of Islamic architecture, blending distinct, and sometimes contrasting designs.
Historic Areas of Istanbul		Istanbul	1985	356bis; i, ii, iii, iv (cultural)	The imperial capital of the Byzantine and Ottoman empires, Istanbul has been a major political, religious, and cultural centre for more than two millennia. Its skyline, which includes masterpieces such as the Hippodrome of Constantinople, Hagia Sophia, the Süleymaniye Mosque, and the Topkapı Palace, testifies to the great geniuses of architects through the ages.
Hattusa: the Hittite Capital		Çorum	1986	377; i, ii, iii, iv (cultural)	The formal capital of the Hittite Empire, with its well-preserved city gates, temples, palaces, and the nearby rock sanctuary of Yazılıkaya, is among the last vestiges of the once dominant power in Anatolia and northern Syria.
Mount Nemrut		Adıyaman	1987	448; i, iii, iv (cultural)	Mount Nemrut is the location where King Antiochus I (69–34 BC) of Commagene constructed his own temple-tomb, surrounded by colossal statues and stelae, in one of the most ambitious architectural undertakings of the Hellenistic period.
Hierapolis-Pamukkale		Denizli	1988	485; iii, iv, vii (mixed)	The natural site of Pamukkale is famous for its visually striking landscape, consisting of petrified waterfalls, stalactites, and terraces. The nearby town of Hierapolis, founded at the end of the 2nd century BC, hosts various Greco-Roman structures including temples, baths, a necropolis, as well as examples of Early Christian architecture.
Xanthos-Letoon		Antalya and Muğla Provinces	1988	484; ii, iii (cultural)	The site consists of two neighboring settlements. Xanthos, the centre of the Lycian civilization, exerted significant architectural influences upon other cities of the region, with the Nereid Monument directly inspiring the Mausoleum at Halicarnassus in Caria. Letoon, an important religious centre in Lycia, hosts the Letoon trilingual, which provided the key in deciphering the long-extinct Lycian language.
City of Safranbolu		Karabük	1994	614; ii, iv, v (cultural)	A crossroads of the caravan trade, Safranbolu flourished from the 13th century on. Its architecture became a major influence on urban development throughout the Ottoman Empire.
Archaeological Site of Troy		Çanakkale	1998	849; ii, iii, vi (cultural)	Dating back to more than four millennia ago and serving as a key influence on Homer's Iliad and Virgil's Aeneid, Troy was rediscovered by Heinrich Schliemann in the late 19th century, and has since become one of the most well-known archeological sites in the world.
Selimiye Mosque and its Social Complex		Edirne	2011	1366; i, iv (cultural)	Constructed during the 16th century, the Selimiye Mosque complex at Edirne is considered by the architect Mimar Sinan to be his masterpiece and represents the highest achievement of Ottoman architecture.
Neolithic Site of Çatalhöyük		Konya	2012	1405; iii, iv (cultural)	Occupied between approximately 7400 BC and 5200 BC, the expansive site of Çatalhöyük is among the few examples of a well-preserved Neolithic settlement, with its egalitarian urban layout, roof-access dwellings, wall paintings, and reliefs testifying to a proto-urban way of life.
Pergamon and its Multi-Layered Cultural Landscape		İzmir	2014	1457; i, ii, iii, iv, vi (cultural)	Founded in the 3rd century BC as the capital of the Hellenistic Attalid dynasty, Pergamon was one of the most important cities of the ancient world. After its bequest to the Romans in 133 BC, the city witnessed further development, becoming known as a major therapeutic centre.
Bursa and Cumalıkızık: the Birth of the Ottoman Empire		Bursa	2014	1452; i, ii, iv, vi (cultural)	The first capital of the Ottoman Empire in the 14th century, Bursa, with its innovative urban planning, became a major source of reference for future Ottoman cities. The nearby village of Cumalıkızık, exemplar of the vakıf system, provided support for the development of the capital.
Diyarbakır Fortress and Hevsel Gardens Cultural Landscape		Diyarbakır	2015	1488; iv (cultural)	Diyarbakır has been a city of great significance from the Hellenistic period until the present. The site contains Diyarbakır's 5.800km-long city walls, as well as the Hevsel Gardens, which provided food and water supply to the city.
Ephesus		İzmir	2015	1018rev; iii, iv, vi (cultural)	The ancient Greek city of Ephesus was famed for one of the Seven Wonders of the Ancient World, the Temple of Artemis, which now lies in ruins. After coming under Roman control in the 2nd century BC, the city flourished, leaving behind monumental structures such as the Library of Celsus. The House of the Virgin Mary and the Basilica of St. John became major Christian pilgrimage sites from the 5th century on.
Archaeological Site of Ani		Kars	2016	1518; ii, iii, iv (cultural)	Located close to the Turkey-Armenia border, the medieval city of Ani reached its golden age in the 10th and 11th centuries as the capital of Bagratid Armenia, before going into decline from the 14th century on following a Mongol invasion and a major earthquake.
Aphrodisias		Aydın	2017	1519; ii, iii, iv, vi (cultural)	The site consists of Aphrodisias itself (featuring the 3rd-century BC Temple of Aphrodite) and the ancient marble quarries nearby, which had brought wealth to the ancient Greek city.
Göbekli Tepe		Şanlıurfa	2018	1572; i, ii, iv (cultural)	Dating back to the Pre-Pottery Neolithic age between 10th and 9th millennium BC, the site was likely used by hunter-gatherers for ritualistic purposes.
Arslantepe Mound		Malatya	2021	1622; iii (cultural)	Arslantepe was an ancient city on the Tohma River, a tributary of the upper Euphrates rising in the Taurus Mountains. It has been identified with the modern archaeological site of Arslantepe near Malatya. The first swords known in the Early Bronze Age (c. 33rd to 31st centuries) are based on finds at Arslantepe by Marcella Frangipane of Rome University.
Gordion		Ankara	2023	1669; iii (cultural)	Gordion was the capital city of ancient Phrygia. Occupation at the site is attested from the Early Bronze Age (c. 2300 BC) continuously until the 4th century AD and again in the 13th and 14th centuries AD.
Wooden Hypostyle Mosques of Medieval Anatolia		Countrywide	2023	1694; ii, iv (cultural)	The site consists of five wooden hypostyle mosques in Anatolia dating back to the late 13th and mid-14th centuries.
Sardis and the Lydian Tumuli of Bin Tepe		Manisa	2025	1731; iii (cultural)	Capital of Lydia with a temple, gymnasium, and royal burial mounds.

== Tentative list ==
In addition to sites inscribed on the World Heritage List, member states can maintain a list of tentative sites that they may consider for nomination. Nominations for the World Heritage List are only accepted if the site was previously listed on the tentative list. Turkey lists 80 properties on its tentative list.

Tentative sites
Site	Image	Location (province)	Year listed	UNESCO criteria	Description
Karain Cave		Antalya	1994	iii, iv (cultural)	Palaeolithic archaeological site with early human remains and artifacts.
Alahan Monastery		Mersin	2000	i, iii, iv (cultural)	5th‑century rock‑cut Christian monastic complex on a mountain slope.
Alanya		Antalya	2000	iii, iv (cultural)	Seljuk fortress, harbor works and historic townscape forming a coastal ensemble.
Güllük Dagi–Termessos National Park		Antalya	2000	(mixed)	Well‑preserved Pisidian city ruins set high in the Taurus Mountains.
Harran and Şanlıurfa		Şanlıurfa	2000	i, ii, iii, iv (cultural)	Harran's beehive houses and Urfa's multi‑religious heritage spanning millennia.
Ishak Pasha Palace		Ağrı	2000	i, iii, iv (cultural)	Ottoman‑Safavid styled palace complex at the eastern frontier.
Kekova		Antalya	2000	(mixed)	Island and sunken city ruins visible in crystal‑clear waters.
Konya – A Capital of Seljuk Civilization		Konya	2000	i, ii, iv (cultural)	Religious and educational center with the Mevlana Mausoleum and Seljuk mosques.
Mardin Cultural Landscape		Mardin	2000	ii, iii, iv (cultural)	Hilltop cityscape of stone houses and narrow streets overlooking the Mesopotamian plains.
Seljuk Caravanserais on the Route from Denizli to Doğubeyazıt		Countrywide	2000	ii, iii, iv (cultural)	Network of medieval inns illustrating Seljuk trade and road architecture.
St. Nicholas Church		Antalya	2000	iii, iv (cultural)	Early Byzantine church famous for its frescoes and association with Saint Nicholas.
St. Paul's Church, Saint Paul's Well and surrounding historic quarters		Mersin	2000	ii, iii, iv (cultural)	Early Christian pilgrimage complex including a church, well, and ancient streets.
Sümela Monastery (The Monastery of Virgin Mary)		Trabzon	2000	i, iii (cultural)	Rock‑carved Armenian monastery famed for its frescoed interiors.
The Tombstones of Ahlat the Urartian and Ottoman citadel		Bitlis	2000	i, iii (cultural)	Ancient Urartian and Ottoman gravestones with inscribed epitaphs.
Ancient Cities of Lycian Civilization		Antalya and Muğla	2009	iii, iv (cultural)	Rock‑cut tombs and urban remains of the Lycian civilization.
Archaeological Site of Perge		Antalya	2009	ii (cultural)	Roman provincial capital with a colonnaded street, nymphaeum, and stadium.
Archaeological Site of Sagalassos		Burdur	2009	ii, iii (cultural)	Mountain‑top Roman–Byzantine city with a theatre, fountain, and agora.
St. Pierre Church, Hatay		Hatay	2011	iii, iv (cultural)	One of the world's oldest surviving rock‑cut churches, dating to the 4th century.
Aizanoi Antique City		Kütahya	2012	ii, iv (cultural)	Ancient city featuring a well‑preserved Roman and Byzantine temple, agora, and theater remains.
Archaeological Site of Zeugma		Gaziantep	2012	ii, iii, iv (cultural)	Roman city famed for its richly colored mosaic floors.
Haji Bektash Veli Complex		Nevşehir	2012	iii, iv (cultural)	Sufi lodge, mausoleum, and ritual hall dedicated to the founder of the Bektashi order.
Historic Town of Birgi		İzmir	2012	ii, iv (cultural)	13th‑century mosques, madrasahs, and bazaars of the Aydın Beylik capital.
Historical Monuments of Niğde		Niğde	2012	ii (cultural)	Group of Seljuk mosques, madrasahs, and citadel ruins.
Mamure Castle		Mersin	2012	iv, v (cultural)	Coastal fortress with layers of Roman, Byzantine, and Crusader architecture.
Mausoleum and Sacred Area of Hecatomnus		Muğla	2012	i, iii, iv (cultural)	Tomb monument of the Carian satrap Hecatomnus set within a sacred precinct.
Medieval City of Beçin		Muğla	2012	ii (cultural)	Ruins of Germiyanid citadel, mosque, and hammam from the 13th century.
Odunpazarı Historical Urban Site		Eskişehir	2012	iii, iv (cultural)	Ottoman timber‑frame mansions and traditional handicraft workshops.
Yesemek Quarry and Sculpture Workshop		Gaziantep	2012	ii, iii	Open‑air kiln and workshop site with unfinished stone sculptures.
Archaeological Site of Laodicea		Denizli	2013	ii, iii, iv (cultural)	Hellenistic‑Roman city featuring baths, stadium, and Christian church ruins.
Lake Tuz		Ankara	2013	vii, viii, x (natural)	Second largest lake in Turkey; major site for salt extraction and waterfowl.
Anatolian Seljuks Madrasahs (Buruciye Medrese, Cacabey Medrese, Çifte Medrese, Çifte Minareli Medrese (Erzurum), Çifte Minareli Medrese (Sivas), Gök Medrese, İnce Minareli Medrese, Karatay Medrese, Sahabiye Medrese, Yakutiye Medrese)		Countrywide	2014	ii, iv (cultural)	Series of 13th–14th‑century Seljuk schools exemplifying medieval Islamic architecture and learning.
Ancient City of Anazarbus		Adana	2014	iii, iv, vi (cultural)	Roman city ruins including a triumphal arch, theatre, and defensive walls.
Ancient City of Kaunos		Muğla	2014	i, ii, iii, iv (cultural)	Riverside port city with an agora, theatre, and temple façades.
Ancient City of Korykos		Mersin	2014	ii, iii, iv (cultural)	Fortified island castle (Kızkalesi) and seaside settlement spanning Byzantine to Ottoman periods.
Archaeological site of Kültepe–Kaneş		Kayseri	2014	ii, iii (cultural)	Neo‑Hittite trade colony (c. 2000 BC) with cuneiform archives and palace remains.
Çanakkale (Dardanelles) and Gelibolu (Gallipoli) Battles Zones in the First World War		Çanakkale	2014	vi (cultural)	Battlefields of the 1915 Allied landings and Ottoman defense.
Eflatun Pınar		Konya	2014	iii, iv, vi (cultural)	Hittite sanctuary featuring a spring and deity relief carved in rock.
Vespasianus Titus Tunnel		Hatay	2014	i, iv (cultural)	1st‑century AD Roman water tunnel built under Emperor Vespasian.
İznik		Bursa	2014	ii, iii, v (cultural)	Center of Ottoman tile‑making, featuring the Green Mosque and historic workshops.
Zeynel Abidin Mosque Complex and Mor Yakup Church		Mardin	2014	iii, iv (cultural)	7th‑century mosque and adjacent Mor Yakup Church reflecting early Islamic and Christian co‑existence.
Tomb of Ahi Evren		Kırşehir	2014	iii, vi (cultural)	Tomb of the founder of the Anatolian Ahi guild movement.
Eshab-ı Kehf Kulliye		Kahramanmaraş	2015	iii, iv (cultural)	Religious complex with cave‑church, mosque, and mausolea linked to the "Seven Sleepers" legend.
Historic Guild Town of Mudurnu		Bolu	2015	ii, iv (cultural)	Ottoman guild houses and a 19th‑century town hall in a well‑preserved layout.
İsmail Fakirullah Tomb		Siirt	2015	iv, vi (cultural)	17th‑century Sufi tomb noted for its carved stonework.
Akdamar Church		Van	2015	i, ii, iii, iv, vi (cultural)	10th‑century Armenian island church renowned for its intricate frescoes.
Ancient City of Stratonikeia		Muğla	2015	ii, iv (cultural)	Hellenistic city with a large theatre, colonnaded streets, and monumental fountains.
Mount Harşena and the Rock‑tombs of the Pontic Kings		Amasya	2015	iii, iv, vii (mixed)	Pontic royal rock tombs and an Ottoman‑era house district.
Mountainous Phrygia		Afyonkarahisar, Eskişehir and Kütahya	2015	ii, iii, iv (cultural)	Frigian rock‑cut monuments and ancient settlement remains.
The Bridge of Uzunköprü		Edirne	2015	iii, iv (cultural)	World's longest stone bridge of its time, featuring 174 arches.
The Theatre and Aqueducts of the Ancient City of Aspendos		Antalya	2015	i, ii, iv (cultural)	One of the best‑preserved Roman theatres and its aqueduct system.
Yıldız Palace Complex		Istanbul	2015	ii, iii, iv (cultural)	Late Ottoman imperial palace with pavilions, gardens, and pavilions.
Sultan Bayezid II Complex: A Center of Medical Treatment		Edirne	2016	ii, iv, vi (cultural)	Ottoman hospital, medical school, and kitchen functioning as a 16th‑century care complex.
The Bodrum Castle		Muğla	2016	ii, iii, iv (cultural)	15th‑century crusader fortress built by the Knights Hospitaller, now a museum.
The Malabadi Bridge		Diyarbakır	2016	ii, iv, vi (cultural)	11th‑century Seljuk arch bridge with a strikingly high span.
Van Fortress, the Mound and the Old City of Van		Van	2016	ii, iii, iv, vi (cultural)	Citadel, tell and ancient city layers spanning Urartian to Ottoman eras.
Kızılırmak Delta Wetland and Bird Sanctuary		Samsun	2016	x (natural)	Major migratory bird habitat and biodiverse wetland complex.
Nuruosmaniye Mosque		Istanbul	2016	ii, iii, iv (cultural)	18th‑century Baroque‑influenced Ottoman mosque and complex.
Ancient City of Kibyra		Burdur	2016	iii, iv (cultural)	Roman town noted for its mosaics, stadium, and stoa remains.
Yivli Minaret Mosque		Antalya	2016	ii, iv (cultural)	13th‑century Seljuk mosque distinguished by its fluted minaret.
Hacı Bayram Mosque and Surrounding Area		Ankara	2016	iv, vi (cultural)	15th‑century mosque and historic market district around the tomb of Hacı Bayram‑ı Veli.
Ivriz Cultural Landscape		Konya	2017	ii, iii, iv (cultural)	Rock relief depicting a Hittite king alongside ancient water channels.
Archaeological Site of Assos		Çanakkale	2017	iii, iv, vi (cultural)	Ancient Greek settlement with an Athena temple overlooking the Aegean.
Ayvalık Industrial Landscape		Balıkesir	2017	ii, iii, iv (cultural)	19th‑20th‑century olive oil factories, docks, and Greek‑style houses.
Historic City of Harput		Elazığ	2018	iii, iv, vi (cultural)	Medieval citadel city with mosques and traditional houses perched on a hill.
Niksar, The Capital of Danishmend Dynasty		Tokat	2018	iii, iv, vi (cultural)	Danishmend fortress town with medieval mosque and Ottoman bridge remains.
The Underground Water Structures in Gaziantep; Livas' and Kastels		Gaziantep	2018	iii, iv (cultural)	Subterranean qanat channels and cisterns from the Roman and medieval periods.
Basilica Therma		Yozgat	2018	iv (cultural)	Well‑preserved Roman bath complex with hot and cold rooms.
Bridge of Justinian		Sakarya	2018	iii, iv (cultural)	430 m long late Roman stone arch bridge commissioned by Emperor Justinian I.
Archaeological Site of Priene		Aydın	2018	ii, iii, iv, vi (cultural)	Hellenistic planned city on a grid with an impressive Temple of Athena.
Nature Park of Ballıca Cave		Tokat	2019	vi, viii (mixed)	Karst cave with spectacular stalactite‑stalagmite formations and subterranean lakes.
Koramaz Valley		Kayseri	2020	v (cultural)	Protected ecological area noted for its forested canyon and endemic flora.
Zerzevan Castle and Mithraeum		Diyarbakır	2020	iii, iv, vi (cultural)	Late Roman military outpost and underground Mithraic temple.
Karatepe‑Aslantaş Archaeological Site		Osmaniye	2020	ii, iii, iv (cultural)	Hilltop fortress with Neo‑Hittite hieroglyphic inscriptions and walls.https://whc.unesco.org/en/tentativelists/6470/
Historic Town of Beypazarı		Ankara	2020	iii (cultural)	Restored Ottoman mansions and a crafts marketplace in a historic district.https://whc.unesco.org/en/tentativelists/6469/
The Historical Port City of İzmir		İzmir	2020	ii, iii, iv (cultural)	Multi‑layered port city with Hellenistic agora and Ottoman waterfront structures.
Late Antique and Medieval Churches and Monasteries of Midyat and Surrounding Area (Tur Abdin)		Mardin	2021	iii, iv, vi (cultural)	Collection of rock‑cut churches and monasteries dating from the 4th to 16th centuries.https://whc.unesco.org/en/tentativelists/6535/
Historic Town of Kemaliye		Erzincan	2021	v, vi (cultural)	Stone and timber houses clinging to the Euphrates Gorge slopeshttps://whc.unesco.org/en/tentativelists/6534/.
Ankara: The Planning and Building of a Republican Modern Capital City		Ankara	2025	ii, iv, vi (cultural)	Urban fabric planned from the 1920s as a symbol of modern Republican ideals.https://whc.unesco.org/en/tentativelists/6823/
Middle East Technical University Campus: A Living Modern Cultural Landscape		Ankara	2026	ii, iv, v (cultural)	https://whc.unesco.org/en/tentativelists/7019/
The Genoese Maritime Network: Trading Posts and Fortifications from the Mediterranean to the Black Sea		Countrywide	2026	ii, iv (cultural)	Genoese coastal forts and the iconic Galata Tower from medieval trade networks.https://whc.unesco.org/en/tentativelists/7030/

== See also ==
- List of Intangible Cultural Heritage elements in Turkey
