= Tomb of İsmail Fakirullah =

Shrine in Tillo, Siirt Province, Turkey

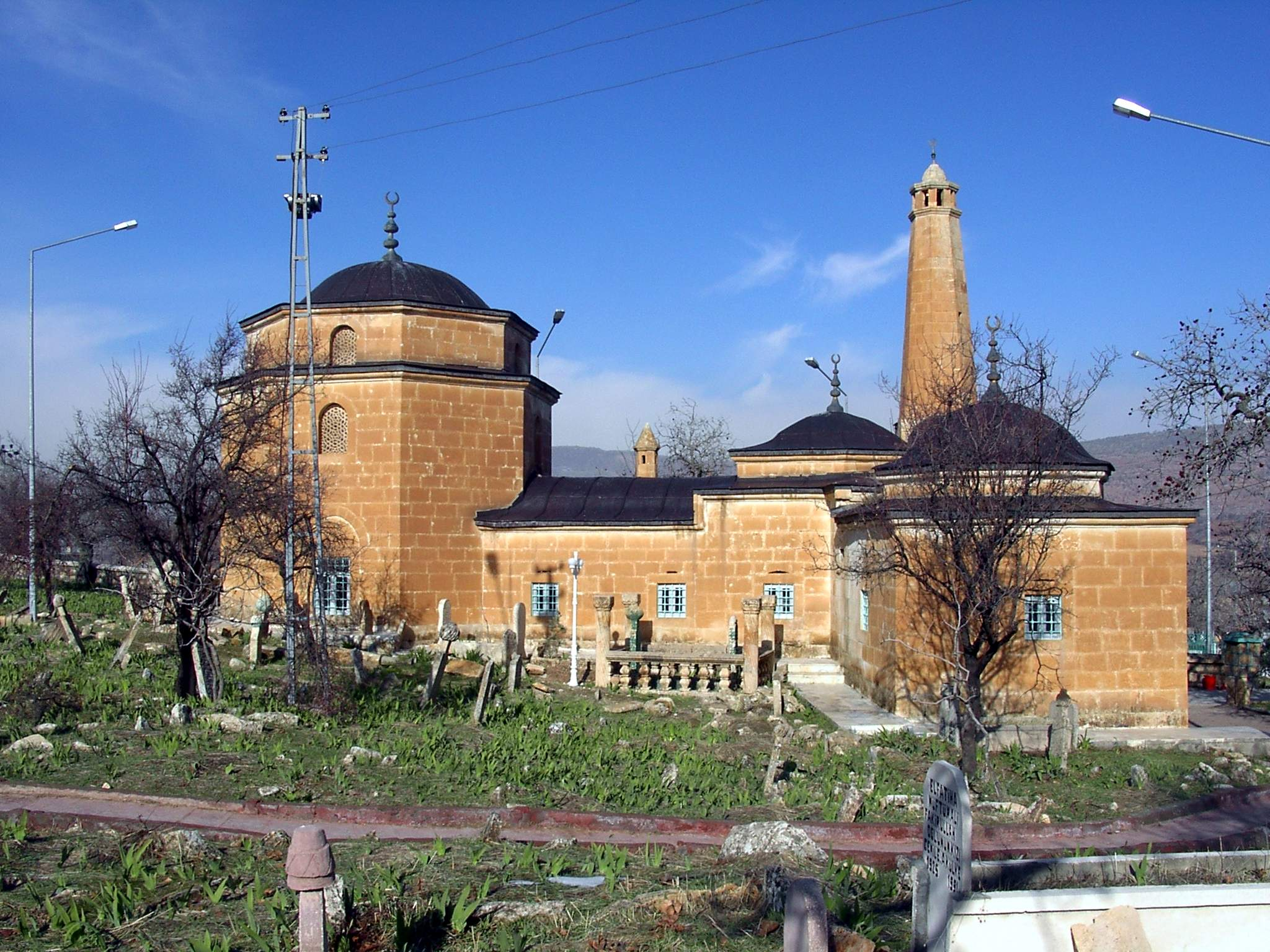
İsmail Fakirullah Tomb

The Tomb of İsmail Fakirullah is a shrine located in the Tillo district of Siirt Province in Turkey. It was built in the 18th century by his student İbrahim Hakkı Erzurumi after the death of Ismail Fakirullah. A mechanism in the tomb reflects the morning sunlight onto the sarcophagus for five minutes every year on 21 March and 23 September. The light mechanism lost its function during the restoration in 1960. The mechanism was made functional again with the work carried out in 2011. A model of the tomb is exhibited in Miniatürk in Istanbul. UNESCO added the tomb to the Tentative list of World Heritage Sites in 2015.

After the death of İbrahim Hakkı, a student of İsmail Fakirullah who lived in the 17th century, and his burial in Aydınlar, a graveyard was formed around the tomb that was built. In the 2005 surface survey, the tombstones that have survived to the present day in this tomb and graveyard were studied and their analyses were made in terms of art history.
