= Koramaz Valley =

Valley in Kayseri province, Turkey

Coordinates: 38°48′11″N 35°40′52″E

Koramaz Valley is a valley located in the Kayseri province of Turkey. The valley, which was formed as a result of an earthquake rupture and is oriented in the east-west direction, is 12 km long and its altitude varies between 250 m and 1,550 m. There are forty-two churches made of rock in the valley. UNESCO included the valley in the Tentative list of World Heritage Sites in 2020.

== See also ==
- List of nature parks of Turkey
- List of national parks of Turkey
