= Saint Paul's Well =

Water well in Tarsus, Turkey

Paul’s Well
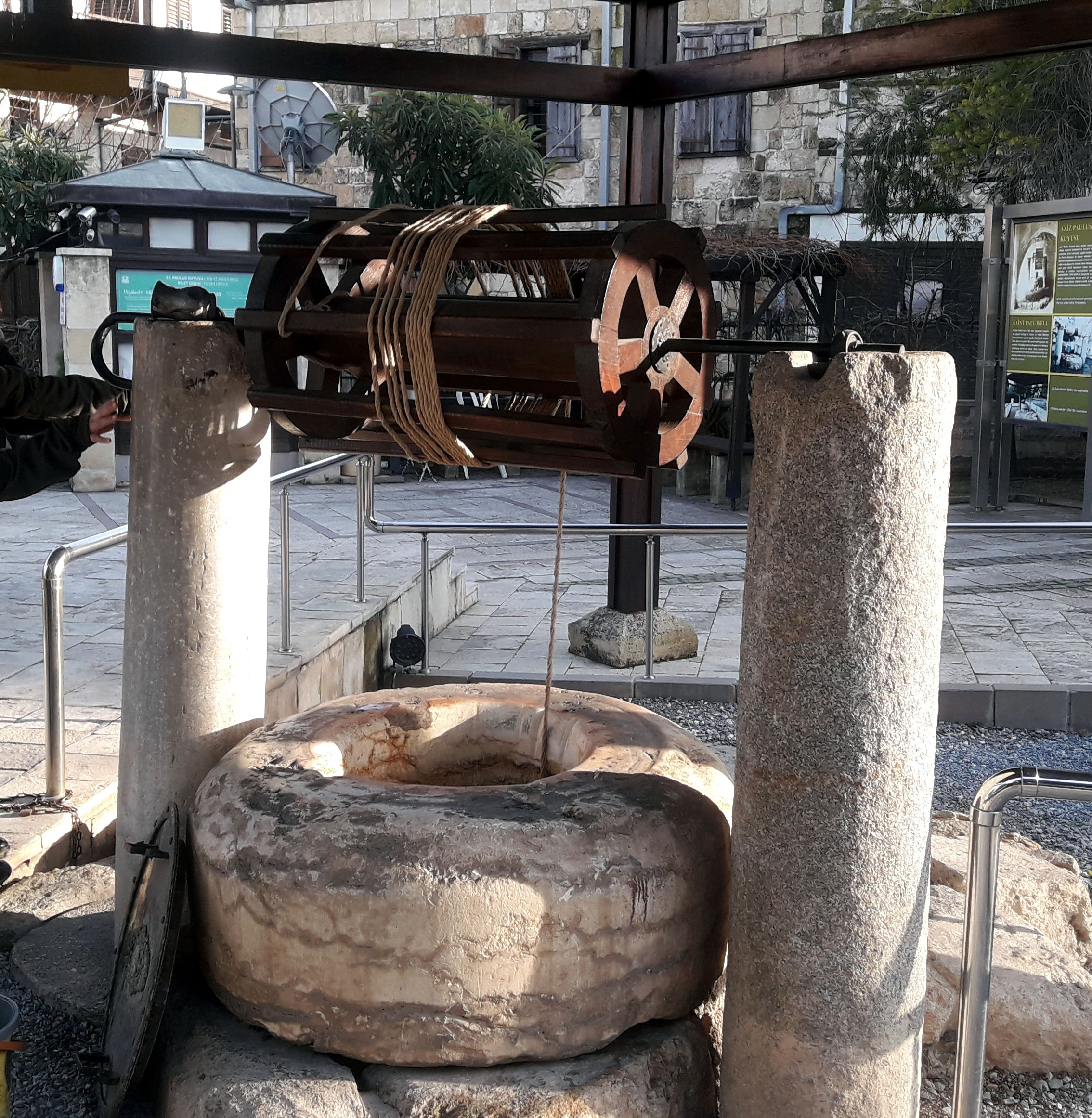
- Location: Kızılmurat mah., Tarsus, Mersin Province, Turkey
- Coordinates: 36°55′09″N 34°53′37″E
- Type: History

Saint Paul's Well is a water well in Tarsus, Turkey, claimed to have belonged to Paul the Apostle (then named Saul) when he lived there. The well, along with Saint Paul's Church, is on the UNESCO Tentative list of World Heritage Sites in Turkey and is under the control of the public authorities.

Tarsus, currently a part of Mersin Province, was an important Roman city in the first century. The ruins of Saint Paul's house, as well as the still-serviceable well in the old quarters of Tarsus, were unearthed during a rescue excavation in 1999. Restored old houses and the ancient road in Tarsus are located nearby.

The well, made of mostly rectangular-cut stone, measures 1.15 metres (3 ft 9 in) in diameter at the top and has a depth of 38 metres (125 ft).
