= Çifte Medrese =

12th-century medical and educational complex in Kayseri, Turkey

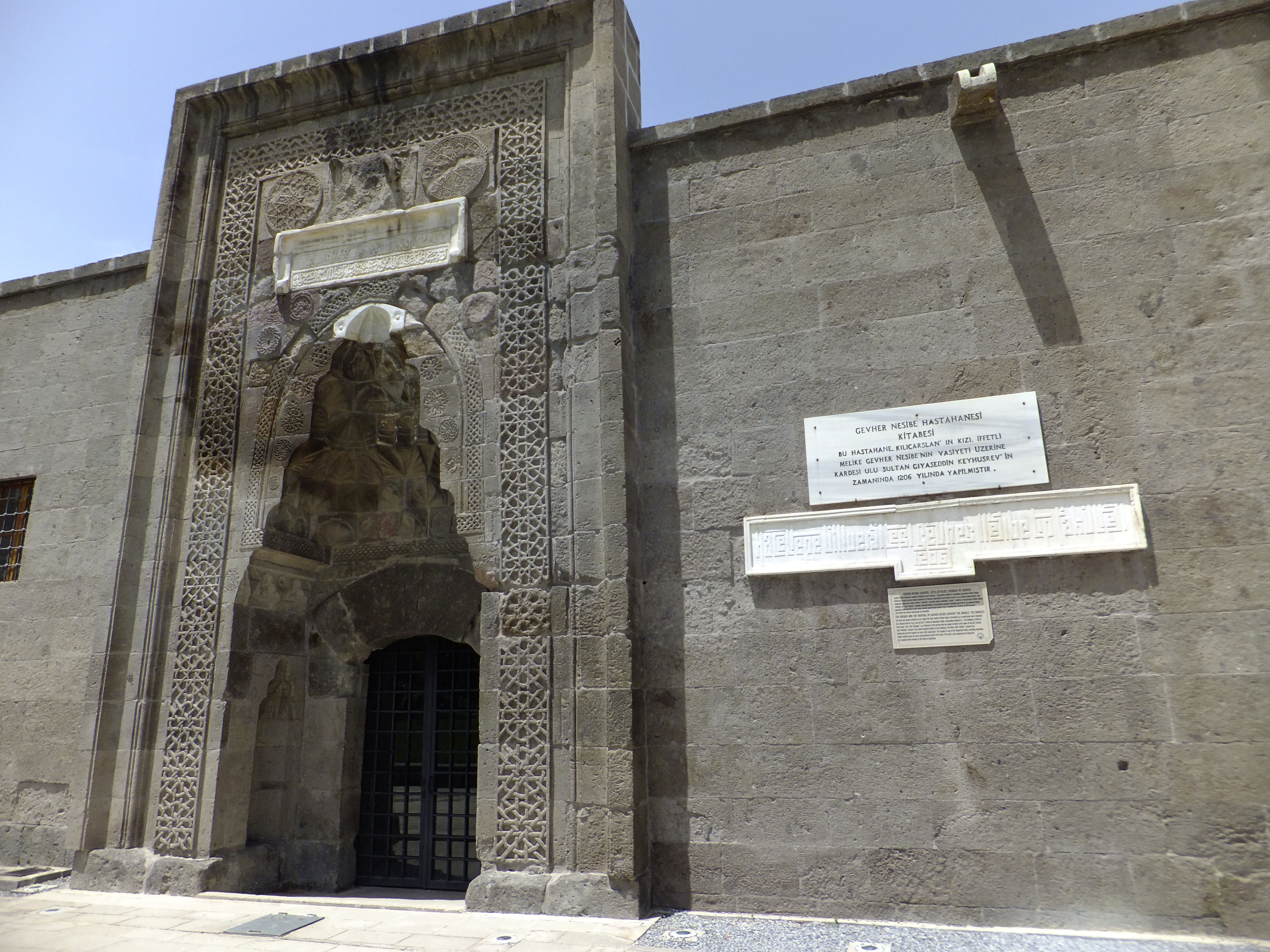
- Gevher Nesibe Medical Complex
- Interactive map of the Çifte Medrese area

General information
- Type: Medical school and hospital (bimaristan)
- Architectural style: Seljuk architecture
- Location: Kayseri, Turkey
- Coordinates: 38.7232°N 35.4874°E
- Construction started: 1204
- Completed: 1206

Çifte Medrese, also known as the Gevher Nesibe Medical Complex (Turkish: Gevher Nesibe Şifahanesi ve Tıp Medresesi) is a 13th-century medical and educational complex located in Kayseri, Turkey. It is considered one of the earliest examples of medical schools in the Islamic world, and possibly the first of its kind in Anatolia combining a hospital (şifahane) with a medical madrasa (tıp medresesi).

Çifte Medrese, one of the Anatolian Seljuk madrasahs, was added to the UNESCO World Heritage Tentative List in 2014.

== History ==
The complex was commissioned by Kaykhusraw I of the Sultanate of Rum in 1204 and completed in 1206. According to legend, it was built in memory of his sister, Gevher Nesibe, who reportedly died of heartbreak and asked for a medical school to be established so that others would not suffer her fate.

== Architecture ==
The complex consists of two adjoining buildings:

- The şifahane (hospital), designed for the treatment of patients, located to the west.
- The madrasa (school of medicine), located to the east, used for theoretical medical education.

It is built of cut stone in the traditional style of Seljuk architecture, featuring a central open courtyard, iwans, domed chambers, and ornamental stone carvings. The complex represents one of the earliest architectural integrations of education and healthcare in the medieval Islamic world.

== Legacy ==
The Gevher Nesibe complex played a crucial role in the history of medicine in Anatolia and the Islamic world. It served as a model for later medical complexes throughout the Seljuk and Ottoman periods. Today, it houses the Seljuk Civilization Museum (Selçuklu Uygarlığı Müzesi), showcasing artifacts and information about Seljuk culture and science.

== See also ==
- Islamic medicine
