= Mount Harşena =

Mountain peak in Turkey

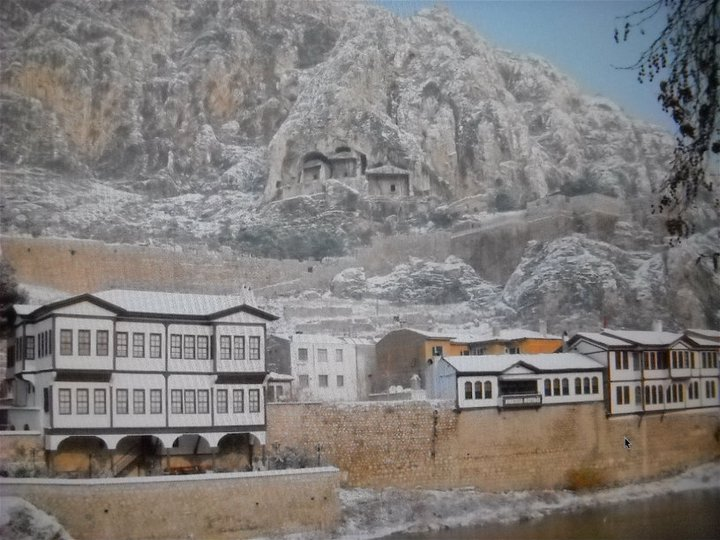
- Historical houses and rock tombs above Mount Harşena

Highest point
- Elevation: 272 m (892 ft)
- Coordinates: 40°39′18″N 35°49′44″E

Geography
- Location within Turkey
- Location: Amasya Province, Turkey

Mount Harşena (Turkish: Harşena Dağı) is a mountain located in Amasya, the capital of the Amasya Province of Turkey. It has a height of 272 m (892 ft). Mount Harşena was added to the tentative list in the cultural category of UNESCO World Heritage Site on 13 April 2015 alongside the tombs of the kings of Pontus.

Amasya is located at an extremely important junction. Due to this feature, it has been governed by many states throughout history. Mount Harşena, located right next to the Yeşilırmak river passing through Amasya, has been inhabited for thousands of years. The settlement in the region dates back to the Early Bronze Age. After this period, the region came under Phrygian, Scythian, Persian, Pontus, Roman, Eastern Roman, Danishment, Ilkhanid, Seljuk and Ottoman domination.

== History ==
The Kingdom of Pontus was founded in Amaseia (Amasya) in 281 BC by Mithridates I, one of the Persian satraps. After Amaseia was declared the capital of Pontus, monumental tombs began to be built on Mount Harşena. The heights of these tombs vary between 8-15 meters. In the Maidens' Palace area, there are rock tombs belonging to five kings who reigned from the Founding King Mithridates I to Pharnaces I.
