= Sahabiye Medrese =

13th-century madrasa in Kayseri, Turkey

- Sahabiye Medresesi
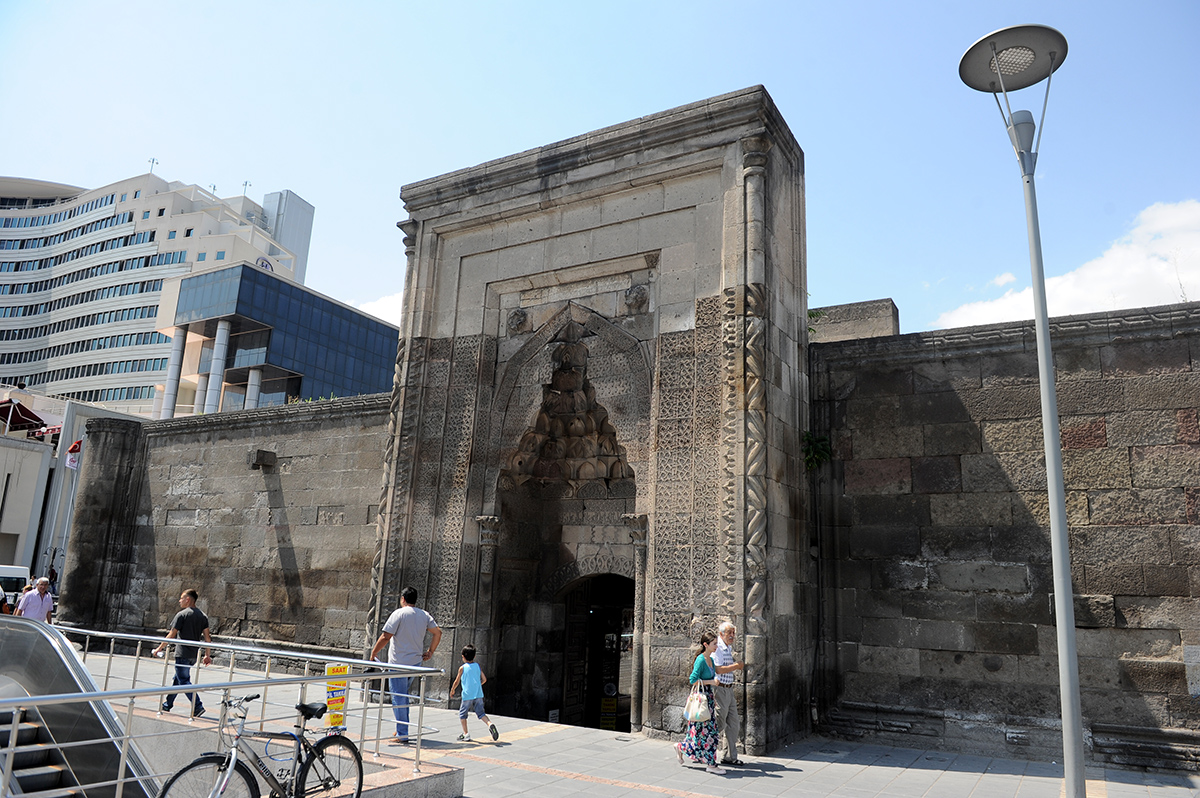

- Sahabiye Medrese in Kayseri, Turkey

Religion
- Affiliation: Islam
- Province: Kayseri
- Region: Central Anatolia

Location
- Location: Kayseri
- Country: Turkey
- Coordinates: 38°43′24.19″N 35°29′12.66″E

Architecture
- Type: Madrasa
- Style: Seljuk
- Completed: 1268; 758 years ago
- Materials: Masonry stone

Sahabiye Medrese (Turkish: Sahabiye Medresesi) is a historical 13th-century madrasa in Kayseri, Turkey.

== History ==
The madrasa is located in the center of Kayseri city. According to the two-line inscription made of white marble on the siege arch surrounding the muqarnas covered arch of the portal, it was built during the reign of Anatolian Seljuk Sultan Ghiyāth ad-Dīn Kaykhusraw bin Qilij Arslān by order of Visier Sahib Ata Fahreddin Ali bin Hüseyin in 1267–1268.

== Architecture ==
The building has a rectangular form with a courtyard in between. It was built in Anatolian Seljuks architectural style with a front façade having caravanserai appearance. The madrasa is a one-storey building with four iwans. The vaulted high portal is situated in the center of the southern building side, and is decorated with geometric and floral ornaments, example of late Anatolian Seljuk architecture. Lion-headed gargoyles are placed symmetrically under the ledges of the walls on both sides of the portal. On each corner of the main façade, cylindrical towers rise up. The other facades, which are arranged more simply than the main façade, are enlivened with loophole windows and gargoyles.

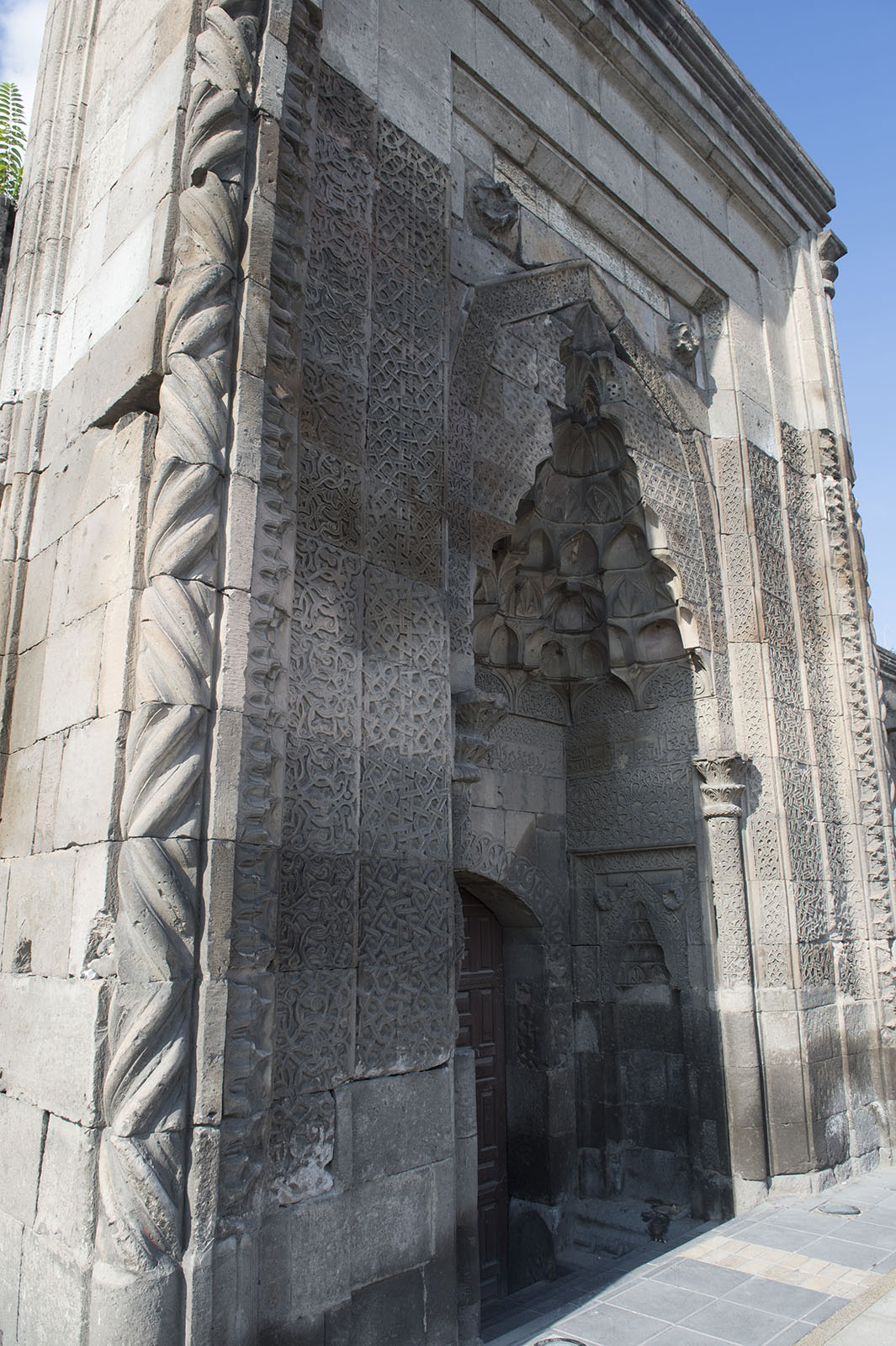
Portal of the Sahabiye Medrese

The monumental portal is decorated with borders that gradually follow each other from outside to inside. The low-arched door opening in the middle of the portal is located in a muqarnas-shaped niche surrounded by a high pointed arch. On the upper part of the door arch, a band of text written in relief with naskh encircles the door niche in three directions. The siege arch sits on the two-storey capitals of the colonnades that limit the door niche at the bottom on both sides. On the arch spandrels, there are two ribs with heavily worn surfaces and a marble inscription plate in the upper middle part. A narrow concave border limits the stalactite entrance section from three directions. On the side faces of the door niche, there are mihrabs with muqarnas ornaments.

From the low arched door opening of the portal, one enters the entrance iwan covered with a pointed barrel vault. There are wide niches with eyebrow arches opposite each other on the east and west walls of the iwan. The rectangular planned spaces on both sides of the entrance iwan also have pointed barrel vaults.

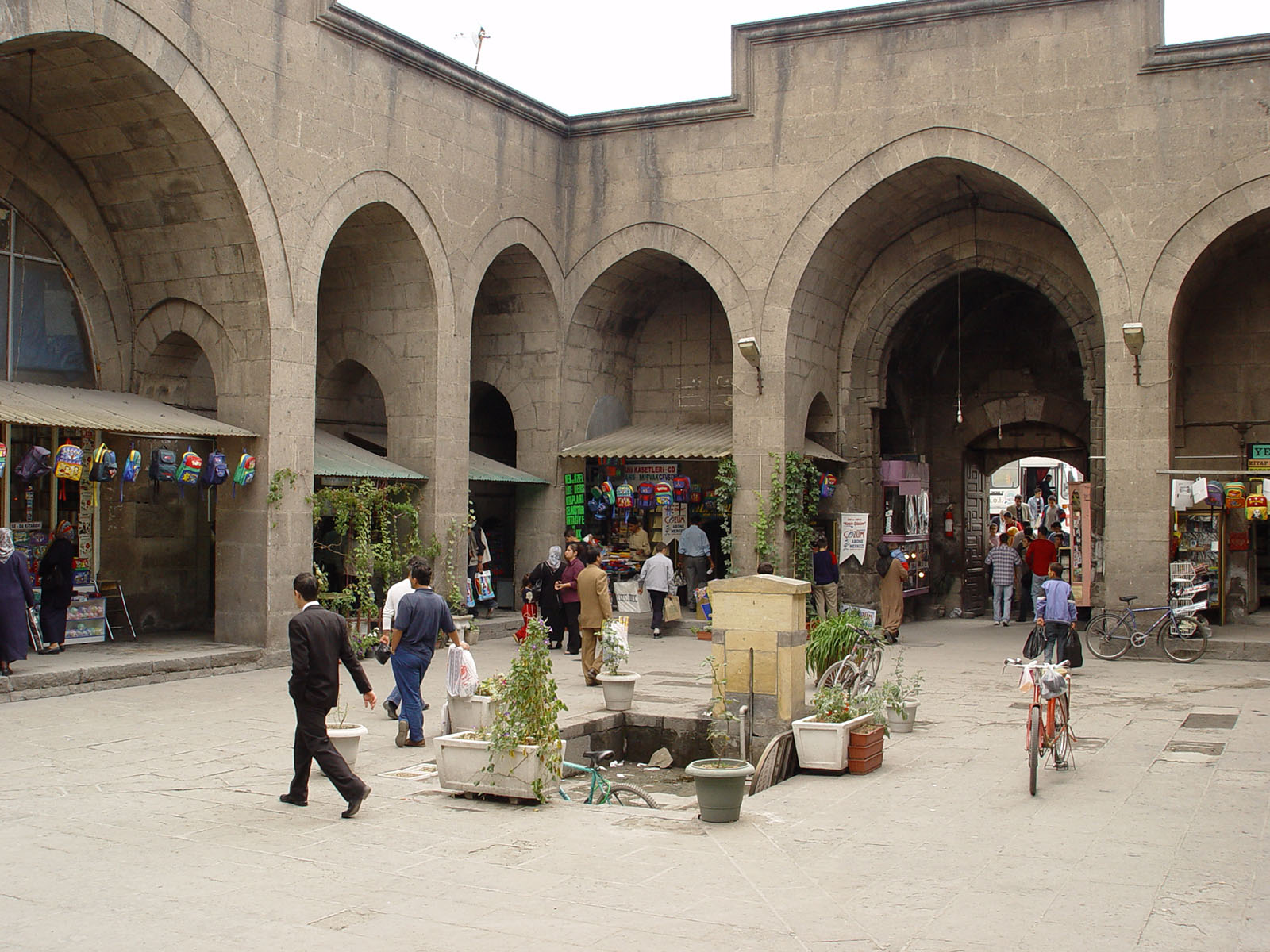
A view of the courtyard of the madrasa

The rectangular planned courtyard, which is reached through the entrance iwan, is a large area surrounded by porticoes opening as pointed arches resting on square-planned legs along the east, west and south wings. The iwan arches are wider and higher than the portico bays. There is currently a rectangular pool in the middle of the courtyard.

Behind the porticoes surrounding the courtyard in a U-plan, there are rooms of different sizes covered with pointed barrel vaults.

The main iwan in the middle of the northern façade of the courtyard is a large volume covered with a pointed barrel vault. The door in the middle of the north wall was opened later. Of the two square-plan rooms adjacent to the iwan from the east and west wings, the west wing is covered with a concrete dome, and fittings such as doors and windows were later opened on the north wall. The square-shaped room in the east wing is covered with a vault. From old photographs of the building, it can be determined that both spaces next to the main iwan were domed in the past. The madrasa was built entirely with cut stone.

The portal of the madrasa is decorated with meticulous stone workmanship. The borders, which form gradual surfaces from outside to inside, feature intricate decorations consisting mainly of geometric interlockings. In addition, the figurative depictions sandwiched between dense stylized floral decorations with palmette and rumi motifs connected to each other by curved branches are remarkable. It is possible that the lion heads carved on the façades on the capitals of the columns, on which the siege arch sits, are talismanic depictions that are thought to protect the building against evil, as extensions of an old tradition.

In the madrasa, which underwent a major renovation in the 1960s, the largely collapsed main walls, portico arches and portal were repaired and completed. The collapsed dome of the room adjacent to the main iwan from the west wing was also renewed with concrete. The building is currently used as a market.
