= Ballıca Cave =

Cave in Tokat Province, Turkey

- Ballıca Mağarası
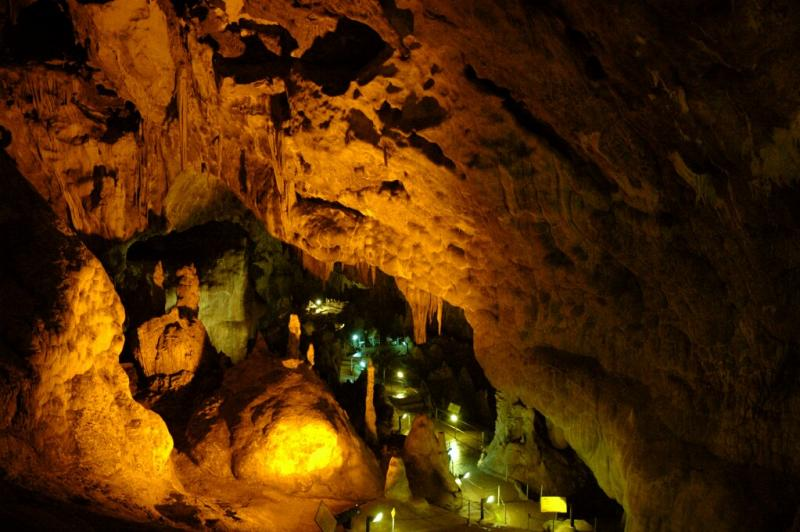

- Location within Turkey
- Location: Pazar, Tokat, Turkey
- Coordinates: 40°13′38″N 36°18′05″E
- Length: 68 m (223 ft)

Ballıca Cave (Turkish: Ballıca Mağarası) is a small cave situated 6 km (3.7 mi) southeast of Pazar, Tokat Province, Turkey. The cave is 600 m (2,000 ft) southeast of the Ballıca village.

Ballıca Cave is a fossil cave. Its overall length is 68 m (223 ft). The upper sections are composed of Permian–Triassic marble and lime. There are two layers above the entrance and five layers below, making a total of seven layers. Five layers were formed over three periods. One section stretches northeast and southwest, consisting of two layers. The second section, containing layers #3 and 34 were formed during the Second Evolutionary Period, and the 5th layer was formed in the 20th century. The gallery, which leads to some open space with a pond, is the first section in the northeast-southwest direction. It consists of the Stalactite and Stalagmite Hall on the first level, and the Fossil Hall and the Bat Hall on the second level. The Magnificent Gallery on the third floor is formed by three adjoining halls: the Mushroom, Column, and the New Hall. Dwarf bat colonies live in different parts of the cave and can be heard and smelled, but not often seen. The many colours in the cave are astonishing, and the filtered air is rich in oxygen.

About 45–50 m (148–164 ft) from the entrance, there is a wide saloon. The New Hall contains the remains (plastered walls, plastered material depot etc.) of use at some point in history. There are numerous stalactites, stalagmites, pillars and water ponds inside the saloon.

== Gallery ==
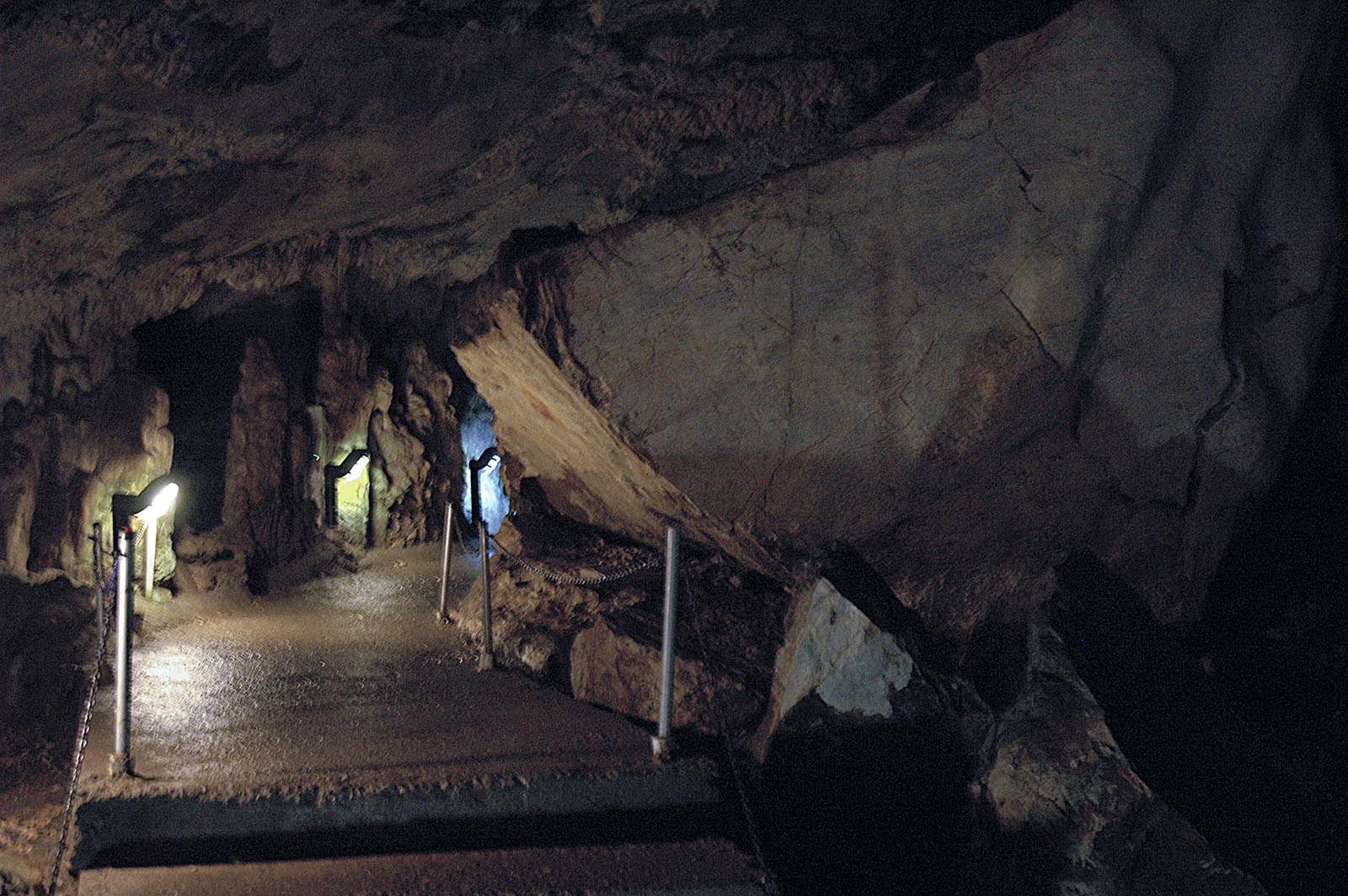
Ballıca Cave Image

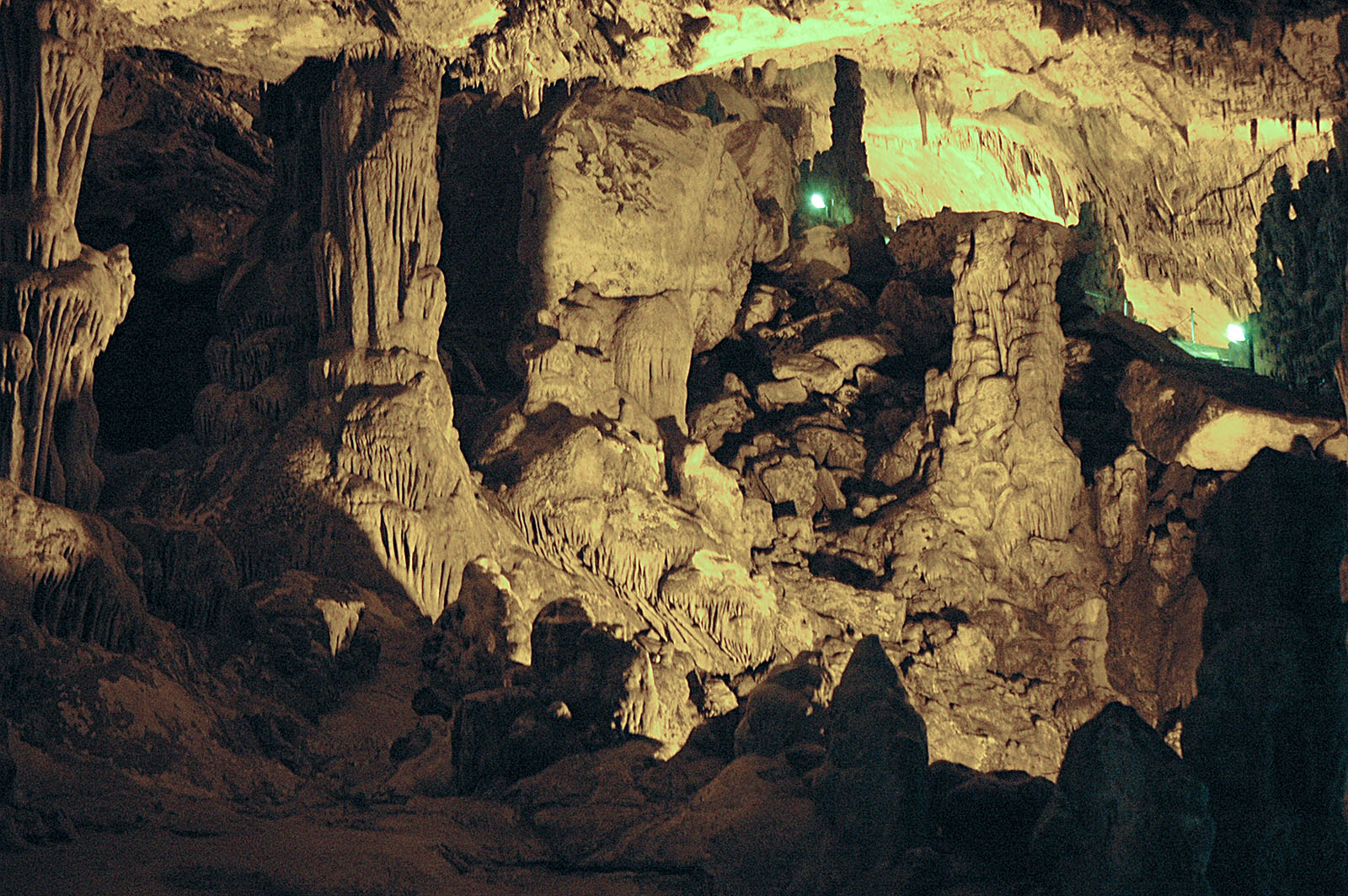
Ballıca Cave Image

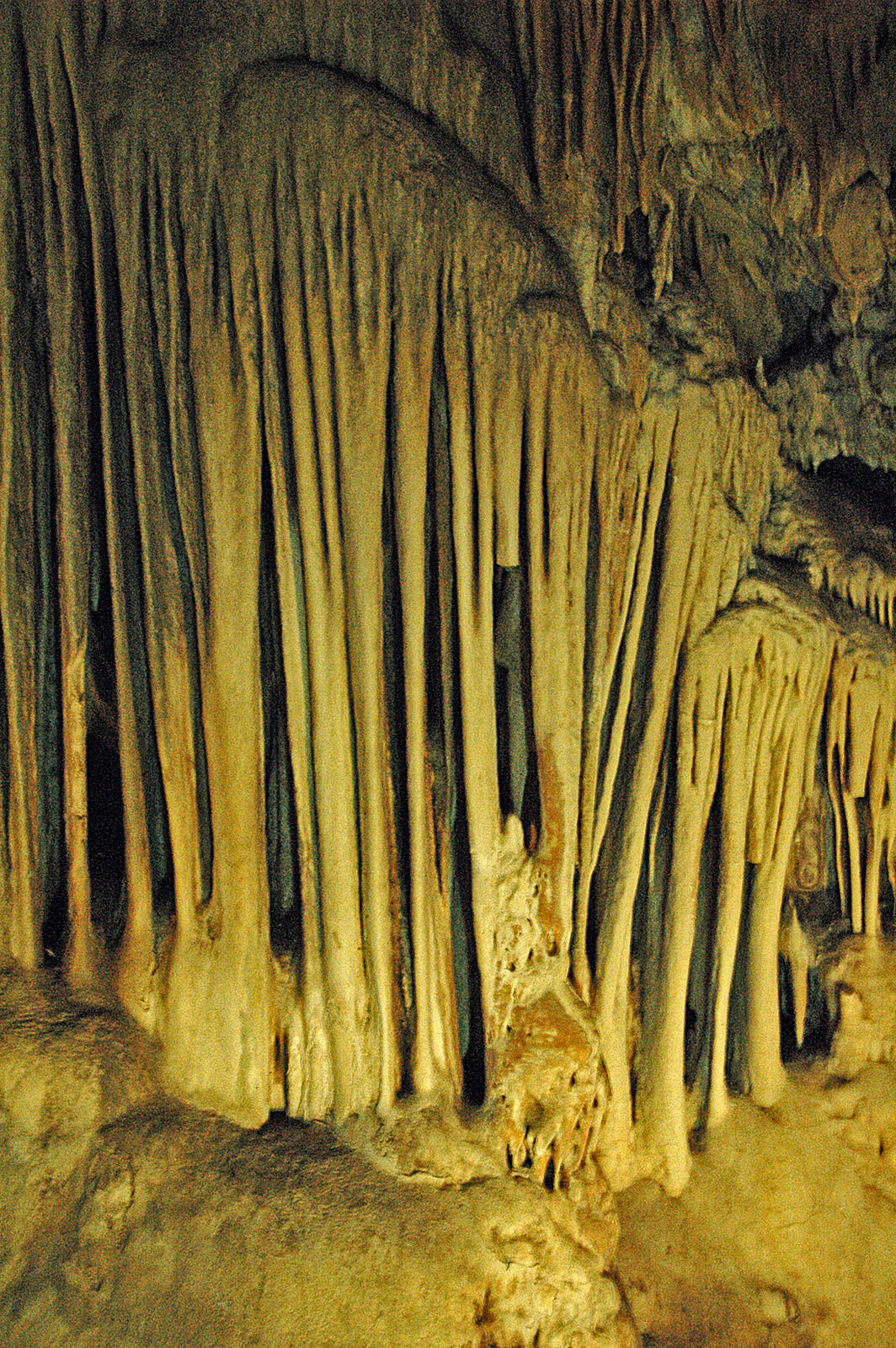
Ballıca Cave Image

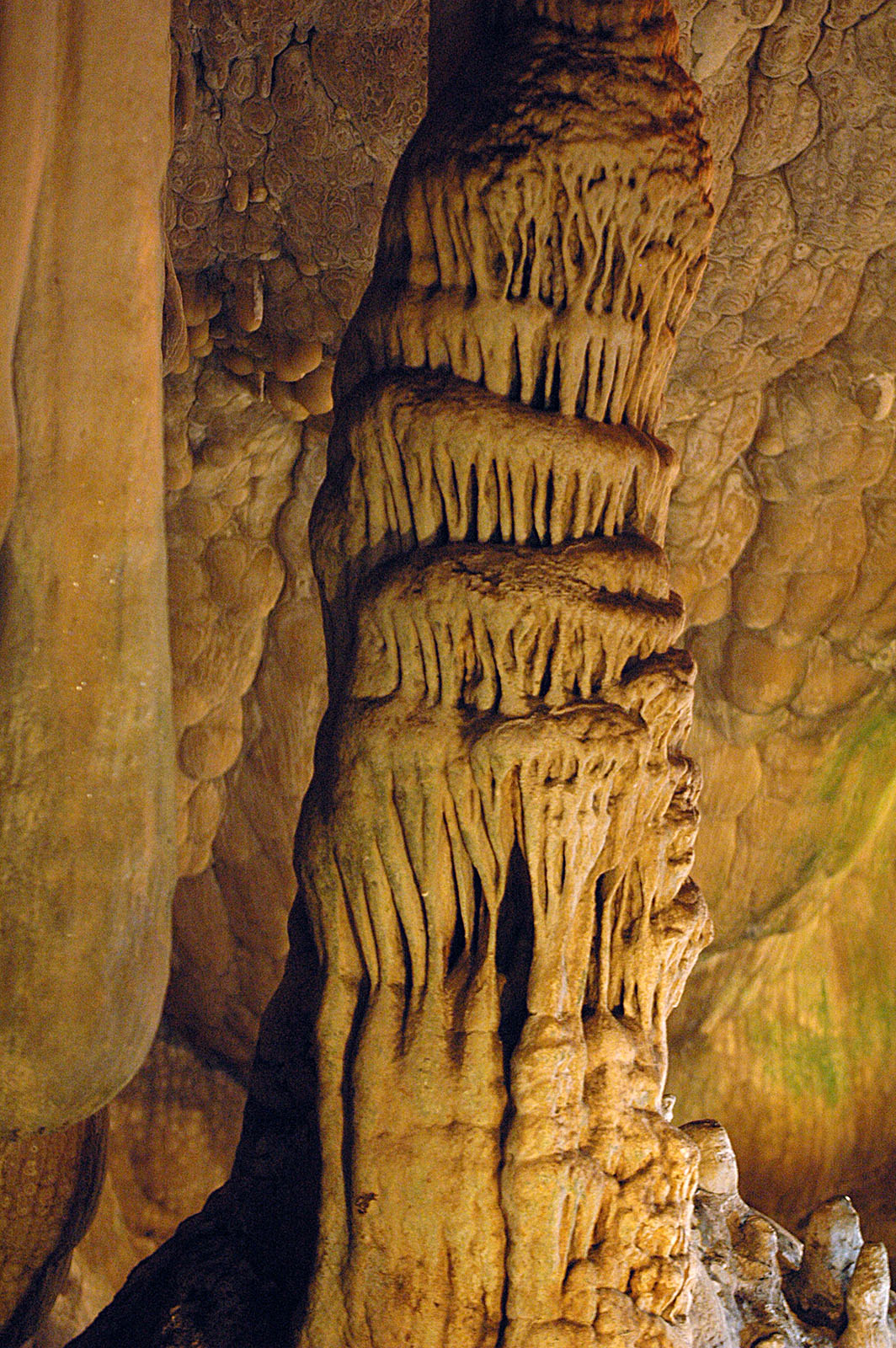
Ballıca Cave Image

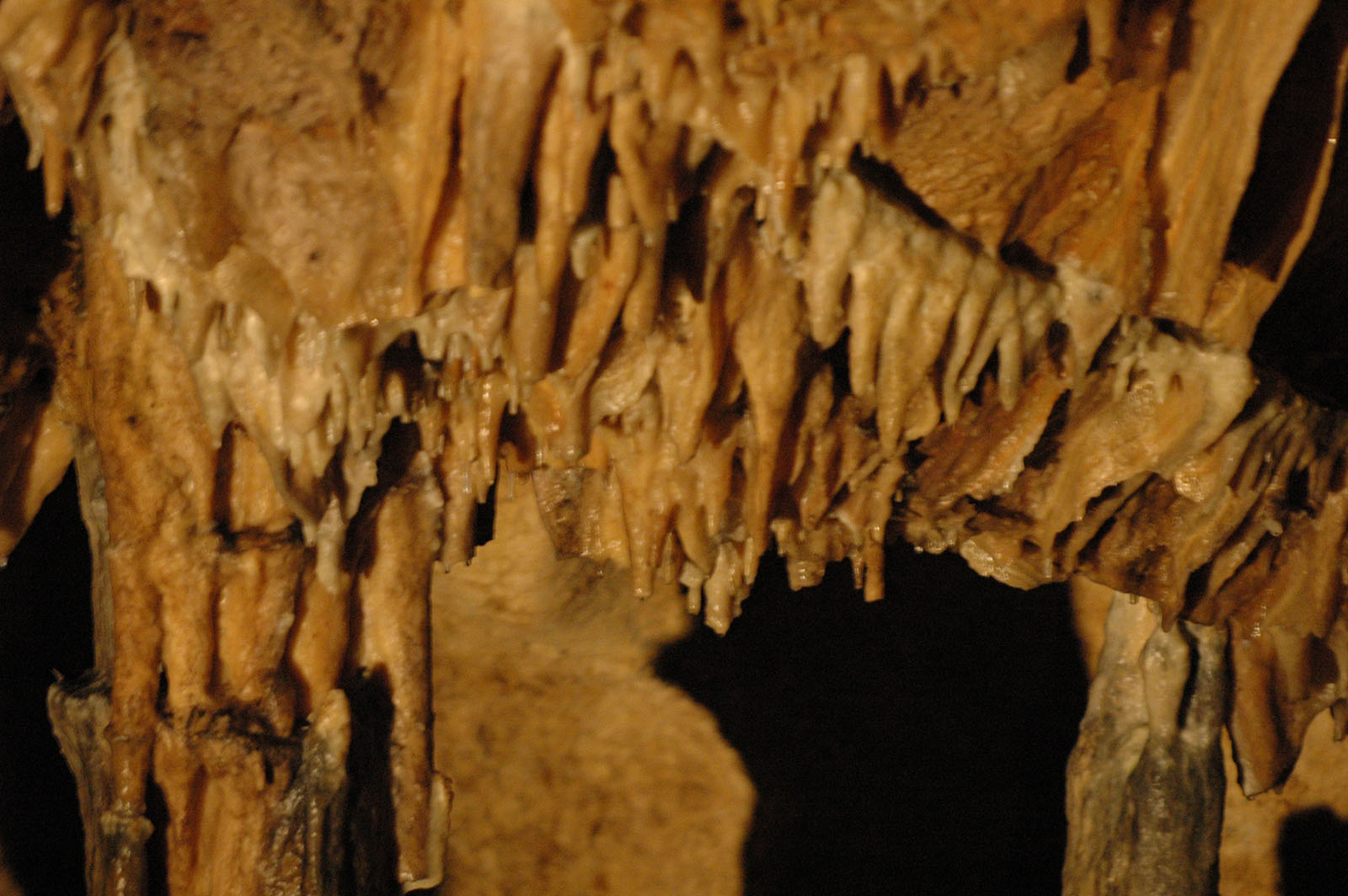
Ballıca Cave Image

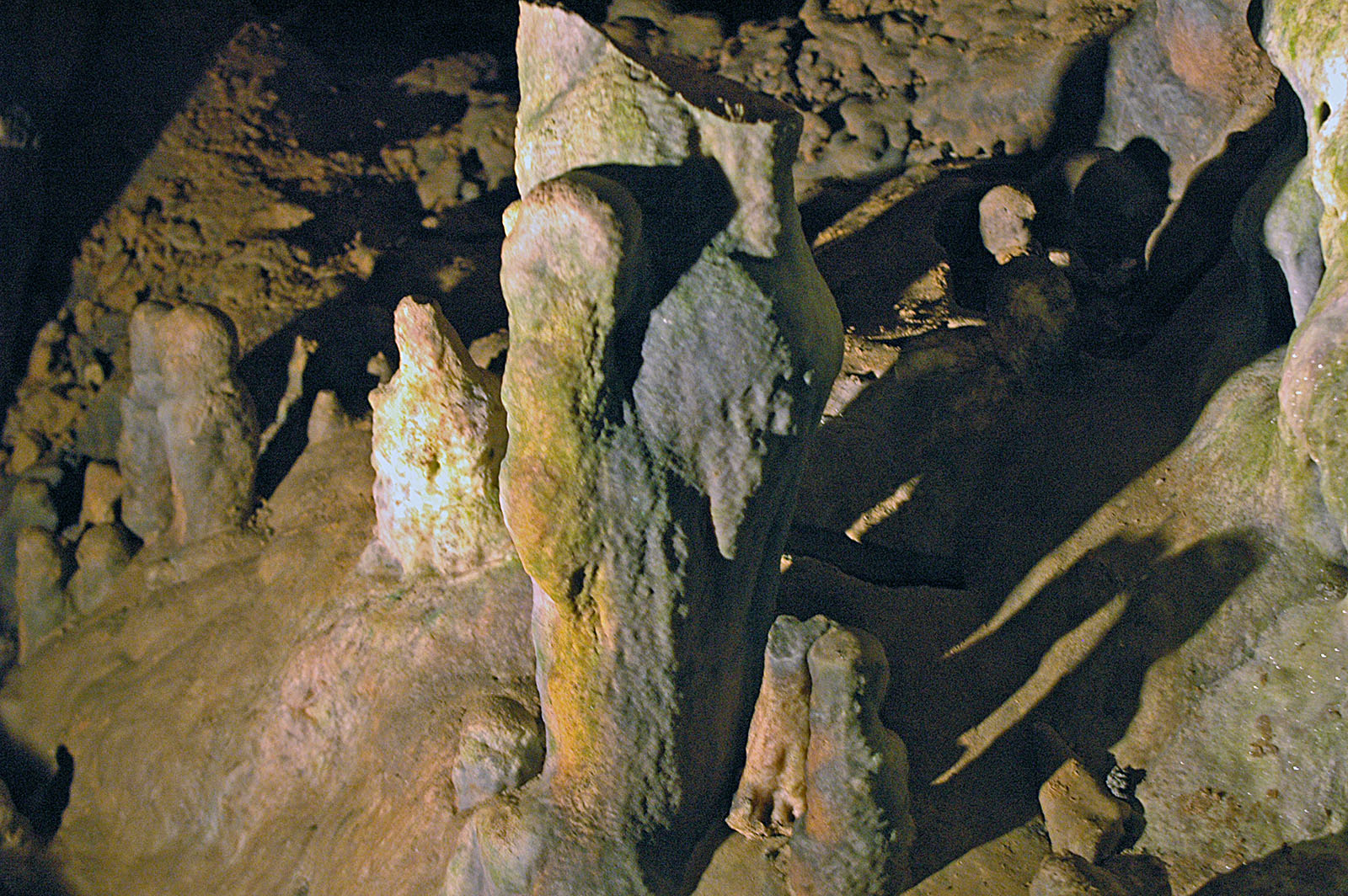
Ballıca Cave Image

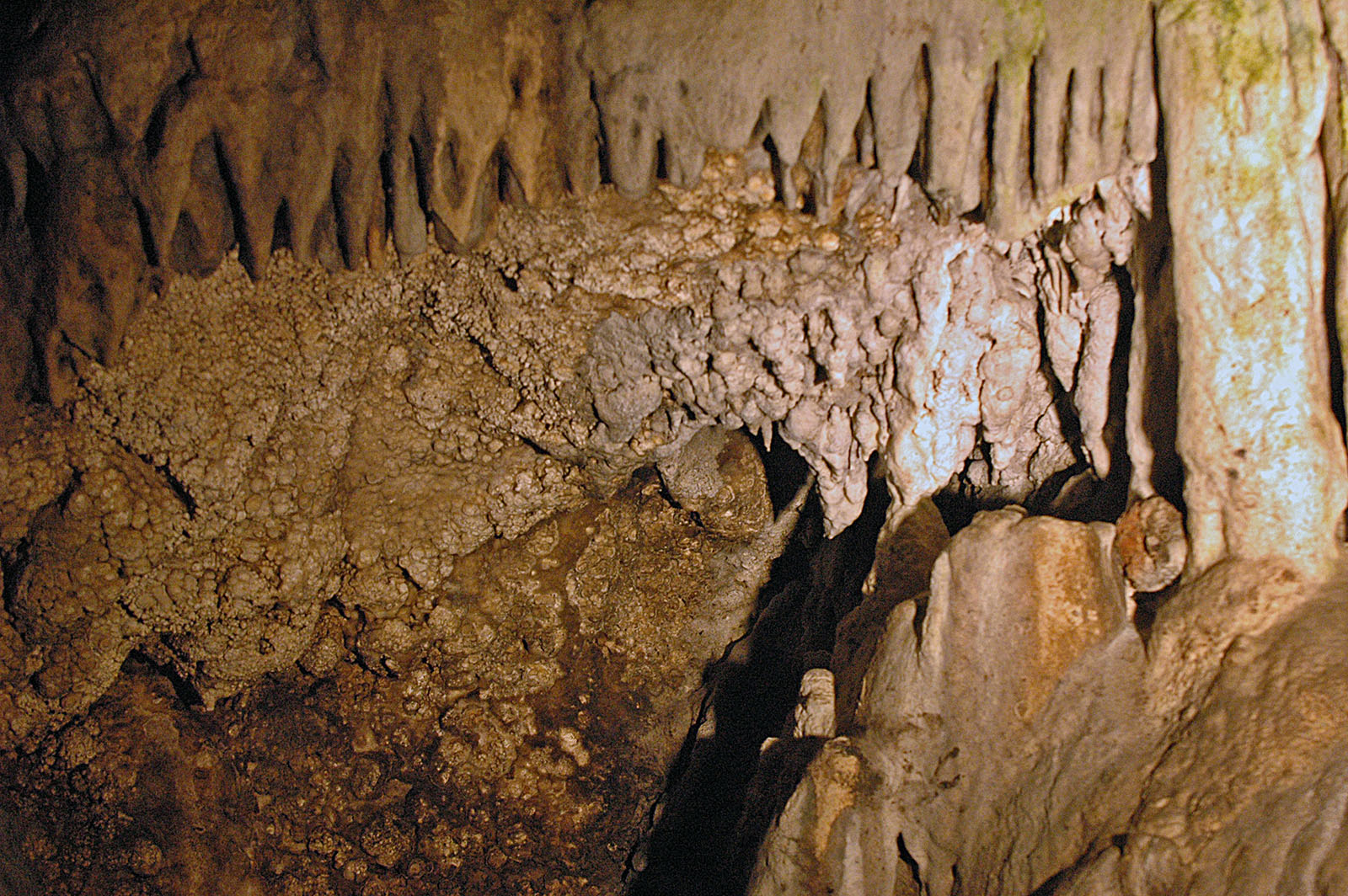
Ballıca Cave Image
