= List of municipalities in Tokat Province =

This is the List of municipalities in Tokat Province, Turkey as of March 2023.

District	Municipality
Almus	Akarçay Görümlü
Almus	Almus
Almus	Ataköy
Almus	Çevreli
Almus	Gölgeli
Almus	Kınık
Artova	Artova
Başçiftlik	Başçiftlik
Başçiftlik	Hatipli
Erbaa	Erbaa
Erbaa	Gökal
Erbaa	Karayaka
Erbaa	Tanoba
Niksar	Gökçeli
Niksar	Gürçeşme
Niksar	Niksar
Niksar	Serenli
Niksar	Yazıcık
Niksar	Yolkonak
Pazar	Pazar
Pazar	Üzümören
Reşadiye	Baydarlı
Reşadiye	Bereketli
Reşadiye	Bozçalı
Reşadiye	Cimitekke
Reşadiye	Hasanşeyh
Reşadiye	Reşadiye
Sulusaray	Sulusaray
Tokat	Çamlıbel
Tokat	Çat
Tokat	Emirseyit
Tokat	Güryıldız
Tokat	Tokat
Turhal	Şenyurt
Turhal	Turhal
Yeşilyurt	Yeşilyurt
Zile	Zile
