= List of populated places in Tokat Province =

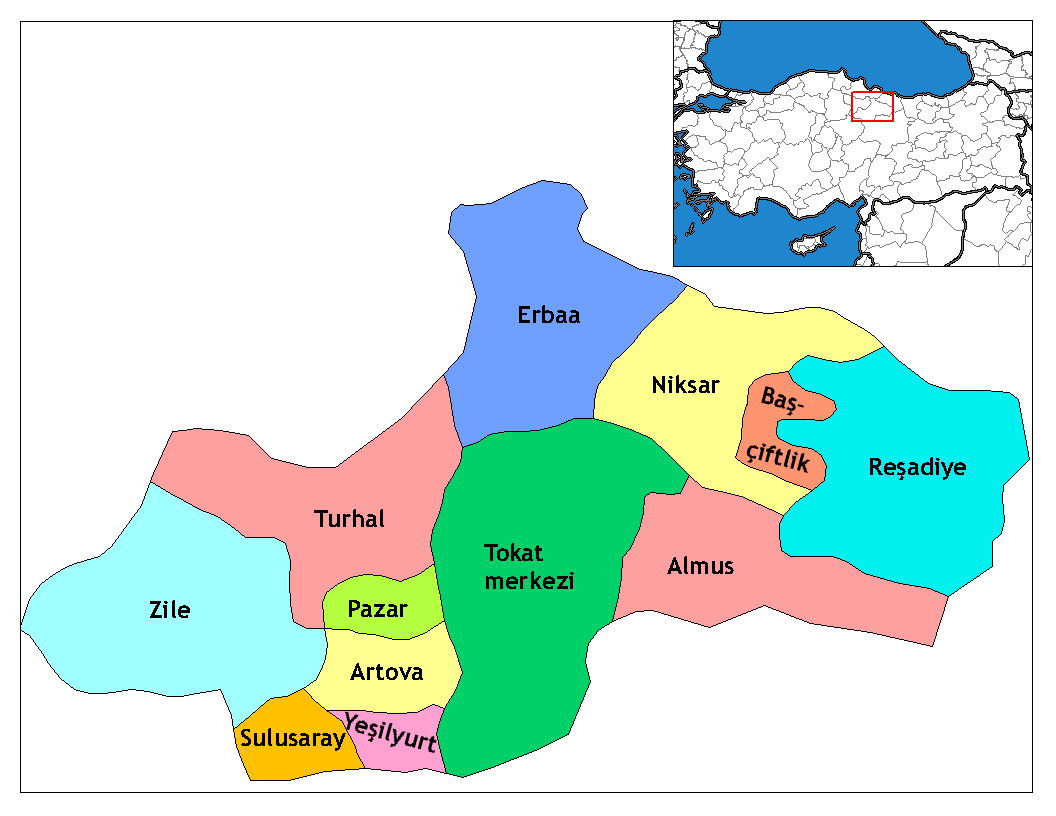
Tokat Province

Below is the list of populated places in Tokat Province, Turkey by the districts. In the following lists, first place in each list is the administrative center of the district.

== Tokat ==
- Tokat
- Acıpınar, Tokat
- Ahmetalan, Tokat
- Akbelen, Tokat
- Akın, Tokat
- Akyamaç, Tokat
- Akyurt, Tokat
- Alan, Tokat
- Altuntaş, Tokat
- Aluç, Tokat
- Aşağıfırındere, Tokat
- Avlunlar, Tokat
- Avşarağzı, Tokat
- Aydınca, Tokat
- Aydoğdu, Tokat
- Bağbaşı, Tokat
- Bakışlı, Tokat
- Ballıdere, Tokat
- Batmantaş, Tokat
- Bedirkale, Tokat
- Beşören, Tokat
- Boyalı, Tokat
- Bula, Tokat
- Büyükbağlar, Tokat
- Büyükyıldız, Tokat
- Çamağzı, Tokat
- Çamaltı, Tokat
- Çamdere, Tokat
- Çamlıbel, Tokat
- Çamlık, Tokat
- Çat, Tokat
- Çatalkaya, Tokat
- Çayören, Tokat
- Çerçi, Tokat
- Çerdiğin, Tokat
- Çökelikkışla, Tokat
- Çördük, Tokat
- Çöreğibüyük, Tokat
- Çubuklu, Tokat
- Daylıhacı, Tokat
- Dedeli, Tokat
- Dereağzı, Tokat
- Derekışla, Tokat
- Dereyaka, Tokat
- Dodurga, Tokat
- Döllük, Tokat
- Efe, Tokat
- Ekincilik, Tokat
- Emirseyit, Tokat
- Eski, Tokat
- Gaziosmanpaşa, Tokat
- Gökçe, Tokat
- Gökdere, Tokat
- Gölcük, Tokat
- Gözova, Tokat
- Güğünlü, Tokat
- Gülpınar, Tokat
- Günçalı, Tokat
- Günevi, Tokat
- Güryıldız, Tokat
- Güzelce, Tokat
- Güzeldere, Tokat
- Halilalan, Tokat
- Hanpınar, Tokat
- Hasanbaba, Tokat
- İhsaniye, Tokat
- Kabakboğazı, Tokat
- Kabatepe, Tokat
- Kadıvakfı, Tokat
- Karakaya, Tokat
- Karkın, Tokat
- Karkıncık, Tokat
- Kemalpaşa, Tokat
- Kervansaray, Tokat
- Keşlik, Tokat
- Kılıçlı, Tokat
- Kızık, Tokat
- Kızılkaya, Tokat
- Kızılköy, Tokat
- Kızılöz, Tokat
- Killik, Tokat
- Kocacık, Tokat
- Kömeç, Tokat
- Küçükbağlar, Tokat
- Musullu, Tokat
- Mülk, Tokat
- Nebi, Tokat
- Ormanbeyli, Tokat
- Ortaören, Tokat
- Pınarlı, Tokat
- Sarıtarla, Tokat
- Semerci, Tokat
- Sevindik, Tokat
- Söngüt, Tokat
- Şehitler, Tokat
- Şenköy, Tokat
- Tahtuba, Tokat
- Taşlıçiftlik, Tokat
- Tekneli, Tokat
- Uğrak, Tokat
- Ulaş, Tokat
- Yağmurlu, Tokat
- Yakacık, Tokat
- Yatmış, Tokat
- Yayladalı, Tokat
- Yazıbaşı, Tokat
- Yelpe, Tokat
- Yenice, Tokat
- Yeşilyurt (village), Tokat

== Almus ==
- Almus
- Akarçay Görümlü
- Alanköy, Almus
- Arısu, Almus
- Ataköy, Almus
- Babaköy, Almus
- Bağtaşı, Almus
- Bakımlı, Almus
- Cihet, Almus
- Çambulak, Almus
- Çamdalı, Almus
- Çamköy, Almus
- Çaykıyı, Almus
- Çayönü, Almus
- Çevreli, Almus
- Çiftlik, Almus
- Çilehane, Almus
- Dereköy, Almus
- Dikili, Almus
- Durudere, Almus
- Gebeli, Almus
- Gölgeli, Almus
- Gümeleönü, Almus
- Hubyar, Almus
- Kapıcı, Almus
- Karadere, Almus
- Kınık, Almus
- Kızılelma, Almus
- Kolköy, Almus
- Kuruseki, Almus
- Mescitköy, Almus
- Oğulbey, Almus
- Ormandibi, Almus
- Sağırlar, Almus
- Sahilköy, Almus
- Sarıören, Almus
- Serince, Almus
- Teknecik, Almus
- Üçgöl, Almus

== Artova ==
- Artova
- Ağmusa, Artova
- Ahmetdanişment, Artova
- Aktaş, Artova
- Aşağıgüçlü, Artova
- Bayırlı, Artova
- Bebekderesi, Artova
- Boyunpınar, Artova
- Çelikli, Artova
- Devecikargın, Artova
- Evlideresi, Artova
- Gazipınarı, Artova
- Gümüşyurt, Artova
- Gürardıç, Artova
- İğdir, Artova
- Mertekli, Artova
- Kayaönü, Artova
- Kunduz, Artova
- Kunduzağılı, Artova
- Poyrazalan, Artova
- Sağlıca, Artova
- Salur, Artova
- Tanyeli, Artova
- Taşpınar, Artova
- Tuzla, Artova
- Ulusulu, Artova
- Yağcımusa, Artova
- Yenice, Artova
- Yukarıgüçlü, Artova

== Başçiftlik ==
- Başçiftlik
- Alan, Başçiftlik
- Aydoğmuş, Başçiftlik
- Dağüstü, Başçiftlik
- Erikbelen, Başçiftlik
- Hatipli, Başçiftlik
- Sarıağıl, Başçiftlik
- Şahnaalan, Başçiftlik
- Yeşilçam, Başçiftlik

== Erbaa ==
- Erbaa
- Ağcaalan, Erbaa
- Ağcakeçi, Erbaa
- Akça, Erbaa
- Akgün, Erbaa
- Alan, Erbaa
- Aşağıçandır, Erbaa
- Ayan, Erbaa
- Aydınsofu, Erbaa
- Bağpınar, Erbaa
- Ballıbağ, Erbaa
- Benli, Erbaa
- Beykaya, Erbaa
- Canbolat, Erbaa
- Cibril, Erbaa
- Çakır, Erbaa
- Çalkara, Erbaa
- Çamdibi, Erbaa
- Çatalan, Erbaa
- Çatılı, Erbaa
- Çerkezfındıcak, Erbaa
- Çeşmeli, Erbaa
- Çevresu, Erbaa
- Değirmenli, Erbaa
- Demirtaş, Erbaa
- Doğanyurt, Erbaa
- Dokuzçam, Erbaa
- Endikpınar, Erbaa
- Engelli, Erbaa
- Erdemli, Erbaa
- Ermeydanı, Erbaa
- Eryaba, Erbaa
- Evciler, Erbaa
- Ezebağı, Erbaa
- Gökal, Erbaa
- Gölönü, Erbaa
- Gümüşalan, Erbaa
- Güveçli, Erbaa
- Hacıali, Erbaa
- Hacıbükü, Erbaa
- Hacıpazar, Erbaa
- İkizce, Erbaa
- İverönü, Erbaa
- Kale, Erbaa
- Karaağaç, Erbaa
- Karayaka, Erbaa
- Kartosman, Erbaa
- Kavalcık, Erbaa
- Keçeci, Erbaa
- Kırıkgüney, Erbaa
- Kızılçubuk, Erbaa
- Koçak, Erbaa
- Kozlu, Erbaa
- Kurtuluş, Erbaa
- Kuz, Erbaa
- Küplüce, Erbaa
- Madenli, Erbaa
- Meydandüzü, Erbaa
- Narlıdere, Erbaa
- Ocakbaşı, Erbaa
- Oğlakçı, Erbaa
- Ortaköy, Erbaa
- Pınarbeyli, Erbaa
- Salkımören, Erbaa
- Sokutaş, Erbaa
- Sütlüce, Erbaa
- Şükür, Erbaa
- Tandırlı, Erbaa
- Tanoba, Erbaa
- Tepekışla, Erbaa
- Tosunlar, Erbaa
- Türkfındıcak, Erbaa
- Ustamehmet, Erbaa
- Üzümlü, Erbaa
- Yaylacık, Erbaa
- Yaylalı, Erbaa
- Yoldere, Erbaa
- Yukarıçandır, Erbaa
- Yurdalan, Erbaa
- Zoğallıçukur, Erbaa

== Niksar ==
- Niksar
- Akgüney, Niksar
- Akıncı, Niksar
- Araköy, Niksar
- Ardıçlı, Niksar
- Arıpınar, Niksar
- Arpaören, Niksar
- Asar, Niksar
- Ayvalı, Niksar
- Bayraktepe, Niksar
- Beyçayırı, Niksar
- Bilgili, Niksar
- Boğazbaşı, Niksar
- Boyluca, Niksar
- Bozcaarmut, Niksar
- Budaklı, Niksar
- Buz, Niksar
- Büyükyurt, Niksar
- Camidere, Niksar
- Cerköy, Niksar
- Çalca, Niksar
- Çatak, Niksar
- Çay, Niksar
- Çiçekli, Niksar
- Çimenözü, Niksar
- Dalkaya, Niksar
- Derindere, Niksar
- Direkli, Niksar
- Edilli, Niksar
- Eryaba, Niksar
- Esence, Niksar
- Eyneağzı, Niksar
- Gerit, Niksar
- Geyikgölü, Niksar
- Gökçeli, Niksar
- Gökçeoluk, Niksar
- Gözpınar, Niksar
- Güdüklü, Niksar
- Gülbayır, Niksar
- Gültepe, Niksar
- Günebakan, Niksar
- Günlüce, Niksar
- Gürçeşme, Niksar
- Güvenli, Niksar
- Güzelyayla, Niksar
- Hacılı, Niksar
- Hanyeri, Niksar
- Haydarbey, Niksar
- Hüseyingazi, Niksar
- Işıklı, Niksar
- Kapıağzı, Niksar
- Karabodur, Niksar
- Karakaş, Niksar
- Kaşıkcı, Niksar
- Kiracı, Niksar
- Korulu, Niksar
- Köklüce, Niksar
- Kumçiftlik, Niksar
- Kuyucak, Niksar
- Kümbetli, Niksar
- Mahmudiye, Niksar
- Mercimekdüzü, Niksar
- Mezra, Niksar
- Muhtardüzü, Niksar
- Musapınarı, Niksar
- Mutluca, Niksar
- Oluklu, Niksar
- Ormancık, Niksar
- Osmaniye, Niksar
- Örenler, Niksar
- Özalan, Niksar
- Özdemir, Niksar
- Pelitli, Niksar
- Sarıyazı, Niksar
- Serenli, Niksar
- Sorhun, Niksar
- Sulugöl, Niksar
- Şahinli, Niksar
- Şıhlar, Niksar
- Tahtalı, Niksar
- Teknealan, Niksar
- Tepeyatak, Niksar
- Terzioğlu, Niksar
- Umurlu, Niksar
- Ustahasan, Niksar
- Yakınca, Niksar
- Yalıköy, Niksar
- Yarbaşı, Niksar
- Yazıcık, Niksar
- Yeşilhisar, Niksar
- Yeşilkaya, Niksar
- Yeşilköy, Niksar
- Yeşilyurt, Niksar
- Yolkonak, Niksar

== Pazar ==
- Pazar
- Bağlarbaşı, Pazar
- Ballıca, Pazar
- Beşevler, Pazar
- Çayköy, Pazar
- Çiftlikköy, Pazar
- Dereçaylı, Pazar
- Dereköy, Pazar
- Doğancalı, Pazar
- Kaledere, Pazar
- Menteşe, Pazar
- Ocaklı, Pazar
- Ovacık, Pazar
- Ovayurt, Pazar
- Taşlık, Pazar
- Tatarköy, Pazar
- Tepeçaylı, Pazar
- Üzümören, Pazar

== Reşadiye ==
- Reşadiye
- Abdurrahmanlı, Reşadiye
- Akdoğmuş, Reşadiye
- Altıparmak, Reşadiye
- Bağdatlı, Reşadiye
- Baydarlı, Reşadiye
- Bayırbaşı, Reşadiye
- Bereketli, Reşadiye
- Beşdere, Reşadiye
- Bostankolu, Reşadiye
- Bozçalı, Reşadiye
- Büşürüm, Reşadiye
- Cimitekke, Reşadiye
- Çakırlı, Reşadiye
- Çakmak, Reşadiye
- Çakraz, Reşadiye
- Çambalı, Reşadiye
- Çamlıkaya, Reşadiye
- Çat, Reşadiye
- Çavuşbeyli, Reşadiye
- Çayırpınar, Reşadiye
- Çevrecik, Reşadiye
- Çınarcık, Reşadiye
- Dalpınar, Reşadiye
- Danişment, Reşadiye
- Darıdere, Reşadiye
- Demircili, Reşadiye
- Dolay, Reşadiye
- Döllük, Reşadiye
- Dutdibi, Reşadiye
- Elmacık, Reşadiye
- Esenköy, Reşadiye
- Eymür, Reşadiye
- Eyüp, Reşadiye
- Gökköy, Reşadiye
- Göllüköy, Reşadiye
- Gurbetli, Reşadiye
- Gülburnu, Reşadiye
- Gülkonak, Reşadiye
- Güllüce, Reşadiye
- Güneygölcük, Reşadiye
- Güvendik, Reşadiye
- Güzeldere, Reşadiye
- Hasanşeyh, Reşadiye
- Hebüllü, Reşadiye
- İbrahimşeyh, Reşadiye
- İslamlı, Reşadiye
- İsmailiye, Reşadiye
- Kabalı, Reşadiye
- Kapaklı, Reşadiye
- Karacaağaç, Reşadiye
- Karataş, Reşadiye
- Karlıyayla, Reşadiye
- Karşıkent, Reşadiye
- Kaşpınar, Reşadiye
- Keteniği, Reşadiye
- Kızılcaören, Reşadiye
- Konak, Reşadiye
- Köklü, Reşadiye
- Kuyucak, Reşadiye
- Kuzbağı, Reşadiye
- Kuzgölcük, Reşadiye
- Muratkaya, Reşadiye
- Nebişeyh, Reşadiye
- Özen, Reşadiye
- Özlüce, Reşadiye
- Saraykışla, Reşadiye
- Sarıyayla, Reşadiye
- Sazak, Reşadiye
- Soğukpınar, Reşadiye
- Taşlıca, Reşadiye
- Toklar, Reşadiye
- Tozanlıfındıcak, Reşadiye
- Uğurlu, Reşadiye
- Umurca, Reşadiye
- Yağsiyan, Reşadiye
- Yenituraç, Reşadiye
- Yeşilyurt, Reşadiye
- Yoğunpelit, Reşadiye
- Yolüstü, Reşadiye
- Yuvacık, Reşadiye

== Sulusaray ==
- Sulusaray
- Alanyurt, Sulusaray
- Alpudere, Sulusaray
- Arpacıkaraçay, Sulusaray
- Balıkhisar, Sulusaray
- Ballıkaya, Sulusaray
- Bayazıt, Sulusaray
- Belpınar, Sulusaray
- Buğdaylı, Sulusaray
- Çime, Sulusaray
- Dutluca, Sulusaray
- Ilıcak, Sulusaray
- Sarıyaprak, Sulusaray
- Selimiye, Sulusaray
- Tekkeyeni, Sulusaray
- Uylubağı, Sulusaray

== Turhal ==
- Turhal
- Ağcaşar, Turhal
- Akbuğday, Turhal
- Akçatarla, Turhal
- Arzupınar, Turhal
- Ataköy, Turhal
- Ayranpınar, Turhal
- Bahçebaşı, Turhal
- Buzluk, Turhal
- Çamlıca, Turhal
- Çarıksız, Turhal
- Çayıraltı, Turhal
- Çaylı, Turhal
- Çivril, Turhal
- Derbentçi, Turhal
- Dökmetepe, Turhal
- Elalmış, Turhal
- Erenli, Turhal
- Eriklitekke, Turhal
- Gökdere, Turhal
- Gümüştop, Turhal
- Hamide, Turhal
- Hasanlı, Turhal
- Kamalı, Turhal
- Karkın, Turhal
- Kat, Turhal
- Kayaören, Turhal
- Kazancı, Turhal
- Kızkayası, Turhal
- Koruluk, Turhal
- Kuşoturağı, Turhal
- Kuytul, Turhal
- Kuzalan, Turhal
- Necip, Turhal
- Ormanözü, Turhal
- Ovalı, Turhal
- Samurçay, Turhal
- Sarıçiçek, Turhal
- Sarıkaya, Turhal
- Sütlüce, Turhal
- Şatroba, Turhal
- Şenyurt, Turhal
- Taşlıhöyük, Turhal
- Tatlıcak, Turhal
- Uluöz, Turhal
- Ulutepe, Turhal
- Üçyol, Turhal
- Yağlıalan, Turhal
- Yazıtepe, Turhal
- Yeniceler, Turhal
- Yeniköy, Turhal
- Yenisu, Turhal
- Yeşilalan, Turhal

== Yeşilyurt ==
- Yeşilyurt
- Bahçebaşı, Yeşilyurt
- Büğet, Yeşilyurt
- Çıkrık, Yeşilyurt
- Çırdak, Yeşilyurt
- Damlalı, Yeşilyurt
- Doğanca, Yeşilyurt
- Doğlacık, Yeşilyurt
- Ekinli, Yeşilyurt
- Gündoğan, Yeşilyurt
- Karacaören, Yeşilyurt
- Karagözgöllüalan, Yeşilyurt
- Karaoluk, Yeşilyurt
- Kavunluk, Yeşilyurt
- Kuşçu, Yeşilyurt
- Sekücek, Yeşilyurt
- Sivri, Yeşilyurt
- Yağmur, Yeşilyurt
- Yeniköy, Yeşilyurt

== Zile ==
- Zile
- Acıpınar, Zile
- Acısu, Zile
- Ağcakeçili, Zile
- Ağılcık, Zile
- Akdoğan, Zile
- Akgüller, Zile
- Akkılıç, Zile
- Alıçözü, Zile
- Alibağı, Zile
- Alihoca, Zile
- Armutalan, Zile
- Ayvalı, Zile
- Bağlarpınarı, Zile
- Bayır, Zile
- Belkaya, Zile
- Belpınar, Zile
- Binbaşıoğlu, Zile
- Boldacı, Zile
- Büyükaköz, Zile
- Büyükkarayün, Zile
- Büyükkozluca, Zile
- Büyüközlü, Zile
- Çakırcalı, Zile
- Çamdere, Zile
- Çapak, Zile
- Çayır, Zile
- Çayıroluğu, Zile
- Çeltek, Zile
- Çiçekpınarı, Zile
- Derebaşı, Zile
- Ede, Zile
- Elmacık, Zile
- Emirören, Zile
- Eskidağiçi, Zile
- Eskiderbent, Zile
- Evrenköy, Zile
- Fatih, Zile
- Göçenli, Zile
- Gölcük, Zile
- Güblüce, Zile
- Gümüşkaş, Zile
- Güngörmez, Zile
- Güzelbeyli, Zile
- Hacılar, Zile
- Haramikışla, Zile
- Hasanağa, Zile
- Hatippınarı, Zile
- İğdir, Zile
- İmirtolu, Zile
- Karabalçık, Zile
- Karacaören, Zile
- Karakaya, Zile
- Karakuzu, Zile
- Karaşeyh, Zile
- Karşıpınar, Zile
- Kazıklı, Zile
- Kepez, Zile
- Kervansaray, Zile
- Kırlar, Zile
- Kireçli, Zile
- Koçaş, Zile
- Korucuk, Zile
- Kozdere, Zile
- Köylüünürü, Zile
- Kurşunlu, Zile
- Kuruçay, Zile
- Kurupınar, Zile
- Kuzalan, Zile
- Küçükaköz, Zile
- Küçükkarayün, Zile
- Küçükkozluca, Zile
- Küçüközlü, Zile
- Narlıkışla, Zile
- Olukman, Zile
- Osmanpınarı, Zile
- Özyurt, Zile
- Palanlı, Zile
- Reşadiye, Zile
- Salur, Zile
- Saraç, Zile
- Savcu, Zile
- Sekikışla, Zile
- Selamet, Zile
- Sofular, Zile
- Söğütözü, Zile
- Süleymaniye, Zile
- Şeyhköy, Zile
- Şeyhnusrettin, Zile
- Taşkıran, Zile
- Turgutalp, Zile
- Uğurluören, Zile
- Uzunköy, Zile
- Uzunöz, Zile
- Üçkaya, Zile
- Üçköy, Zile
- Ütük, Zile
- Üyük, Zile
- Yalınyazı, Zile
- Yalnızköy, Zile
- Yapalak, Zile
- Yaraş, Zile
- Yaylakent, Zile
- Yaylayolu, Zile
- Yenidağiçi, Zile
- Yeniderbent, Zile
- Yeniköy, Zile
- Yeşilce, Zile
- Yıldıztepe, Zile
- Yücepınar, Zile
- Yünlü, Zile
