= Almus (disambiguation) =

Almus is a town and a district of Tokat Province in the Black Sea region of Turkey.

Almus may also refer to:

- Saint Almus, a 13th-century Cistercian abbot
- Almus of Orchomenus, son of Sisyphus Greek mythology
- Almus, a brand of generic prescription medication by Alliance Boots
- Álmos (c. 820 – c. 895), or Almus, the first head of the loose federation of the Hungarian tribes from c. 850

== See also ==
- Almus Dam, a dam near the town of Almus
