= Almus District =

District of Tokat Province, Turkey

- District
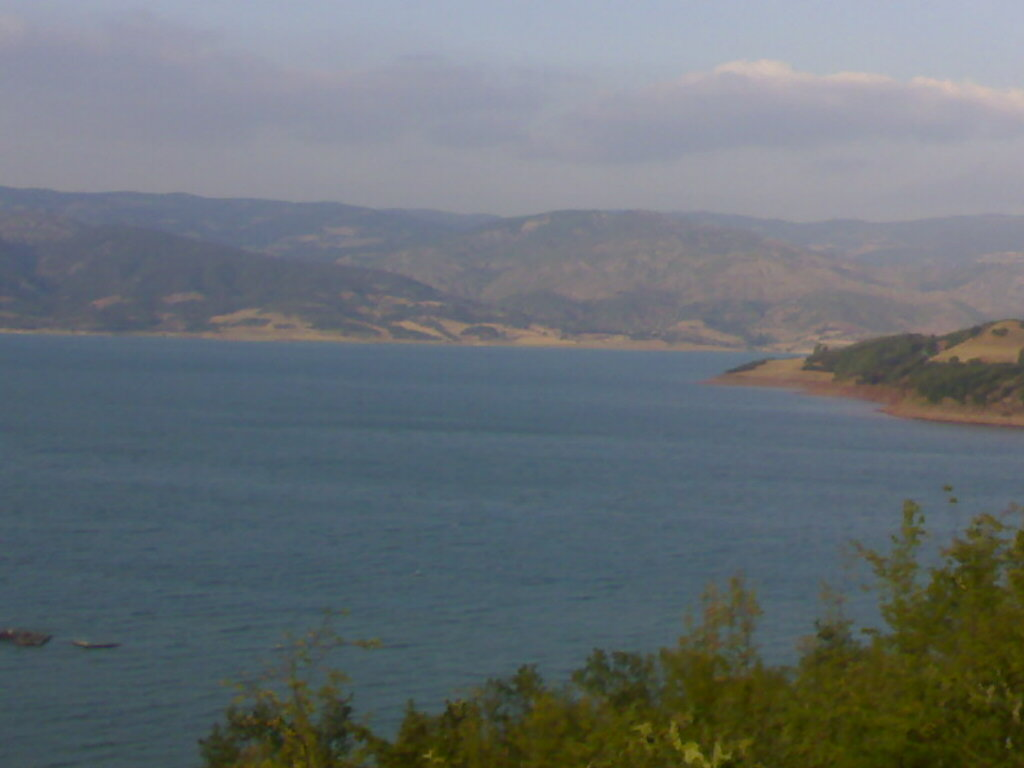
- Almus Dam Lake in Almus district

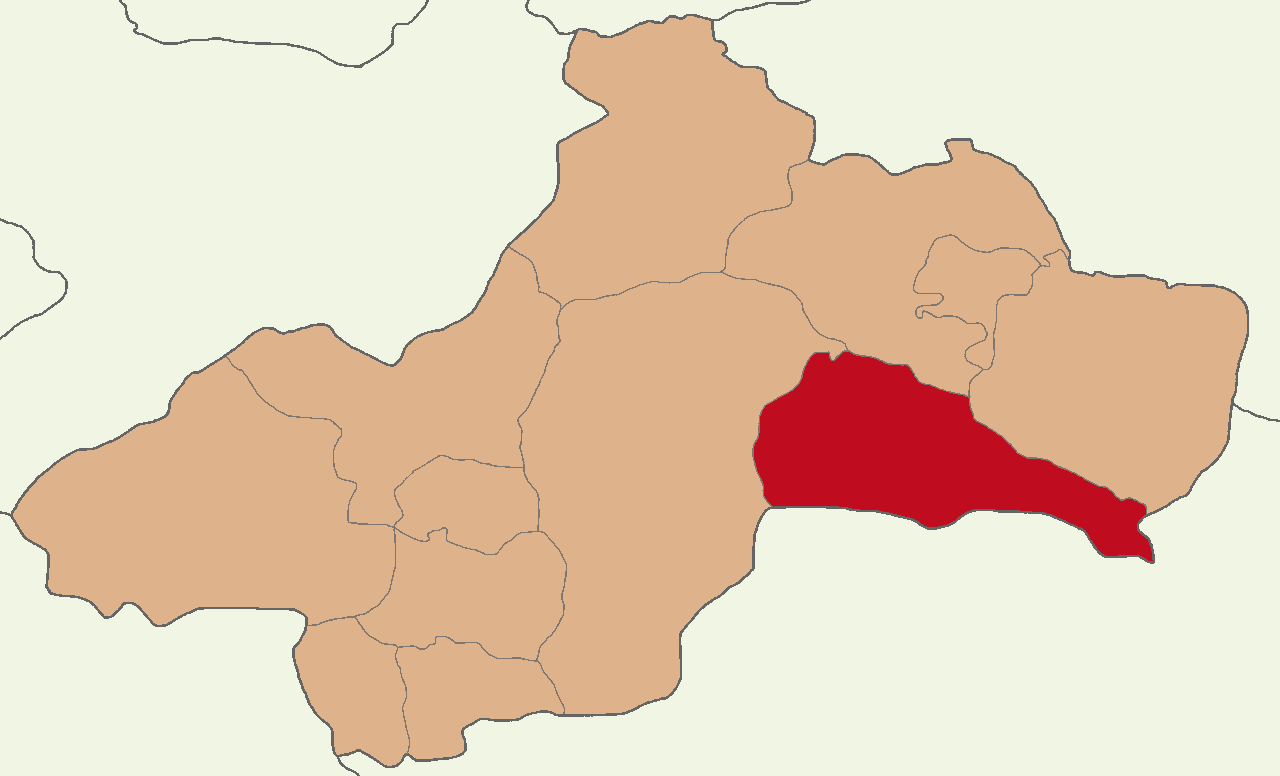
- Map showing Almus District in Tokat Province

- Location within Turkey
- Coordinates: 40°22′N 36°54′E
- Country: Turkey
- Province: Tokat
- Seat: Almus

Government
  - Kaymakam: Tarık Buğra Seyhan
- Area: 1,033 km^{2} (399 sq mi)
- Population (2022): 22,126
  - Density: 21.42/km^{2} (55.48/sq mi)
- Time zone: UTC+3 (TRT)
- Website: www.almus.gov.tr

Almus District is a district of the Tokat Province of Turkey. Its seat is the town of Almus. Its area is 1,033 km^{2}, and its population is 22,126 (2022).

== Composition ==
There are 6 municipalities in Almus District:

- Akarçay Görümlü
- Almus
- Ataköy
- Çevreli
- Gölgeli
- Kınık

There are 32 villages in Almus District:

- Alanköy
- Arısu
- Babaköy
- Bağtaşı
- Bakımlı
- Çamdalı
- Çamköy
- Çaykaya
- Çaykıyı
- Çiftlikköy
- Cihet
- Çilehane
- Değeryer
- Dereköy
- Dikili
- Durudere
- Gebeli
- Göltepe
- Gümeleönü
- Hubyar
- Kapıcı
- Karadere
- Kızılelma
- Kolköy
- Mescitköy
- Oğulbey
- Ormandibi
- Sahilköy
- Sarıören
- Serince
- Teknecik
- Üçgöl

== See also ==
- Almus Dam
