= Reşadiye =

- Municipality
- Location in Turkey
- Coordinates: 40°23′29″N 37°20′18″E
- Country: Turkey
- Province: Tokat
- District: Reşadiye

Government
  - Mayor: Ergül Ünal (MHP)
- Population (2022): 9,795
- Time zone: UTC+3 (TRT)
- Postal code: 60700
- Area code: 0356
- Website: www.resadiye.bel.tr

Reşadiye is a town of Tokat Province, Turkey, located within the Cappadocia land within the Kızılırmak arc in the central part of the Black Sea region. It is the seat of Reşadiye District. Its population is 9,795 (2022). It is on the E80 highway, on the edge of the Kelkit Stream. Reşadiye is surrounded by Ordu in the north, Almus in the south, Niksar and Başçiftlik in the west and Sivas in the southeast. Reşadiye lies on the banks of the Kelkit River.

== Terror attacks ==
The town was the scene of two major insurgent attacks during the Kurdish-Turkish conflict, the first one being the Sazak assault in 1997, a joint operation between the PKK, DHKP/C and the TKP/ML, killing 4 soldiers and the second being the Reşadiye shooting in 2009 in which the PKK killed 7 and injured 3 soldiers.

== Notable people ==
- Hüseyin Özer, Turkish-British executive chef and restaurateur
