= Çamiçi =

Çamiçi (literally "inside the pine trees") is a Turkish place name that may refer to the following places in Turkey:

- Çamiçi, Gerger, a village in the district of Gerger, Adıyaman Province
- Çamiçi High Plateau, a plateau near the city of Niksar, Tokat Province
