= Celal Başkale =

Mahir Koç
- Died: 14 April 2012; Amasya, Turkey
- Cause of death: Killed in operation
- Military career
- Allegiance: Kurdistan Workers' Party
- Rank: Black Sea Region Commander
- Nickname: Celal Başkale
- Known for: Leading Kurdistan Workers' Party operations in the Black Sea Region and commanding the ambushes during the Reşadiye shooting and the Çiğdemlik attack
- Conflicts: Kurdish–Turkish conflict, Reşadiye shooting

Mahir Koç, more commonly known under his nickname Celal Başkale, was a Kurdish commander of the Kurdistan Workers' Party, a militant organization that has been fighting the government of Turkey for autonomy for Kurdish people, since 1984. It is recognized as a terrorist organisation by Turkey, the United States and the European Union.

Başkale started out as a bodyguard for Fehman Hûseyn (Bahoz Erdal), who is the head of the Hezen Parastina Gel (HPG), the PKK's armed wing and later rose to become the commander of all PKK operations in the Black Sea Region.

On 7 December 2009, he led seven PKK guerrillas in an ambush against 15 Turkish commandos known as the Reşadiye shooting or Tokat assault. Seven of the commandos were killed and three were injured.

On 11 April 2012, two Turkish soldiers were killed in a PKK ambush near Çiğdemlik. In response the Turkish military started a large-scale operation against the PKK throughout Amasya Province. Celal Başkale was killed by Turkish forces along with another PKK militant on 14 April.
