= Pazar District, Tokat =

District of Tokat Province, Turkey

Pazar District
- District
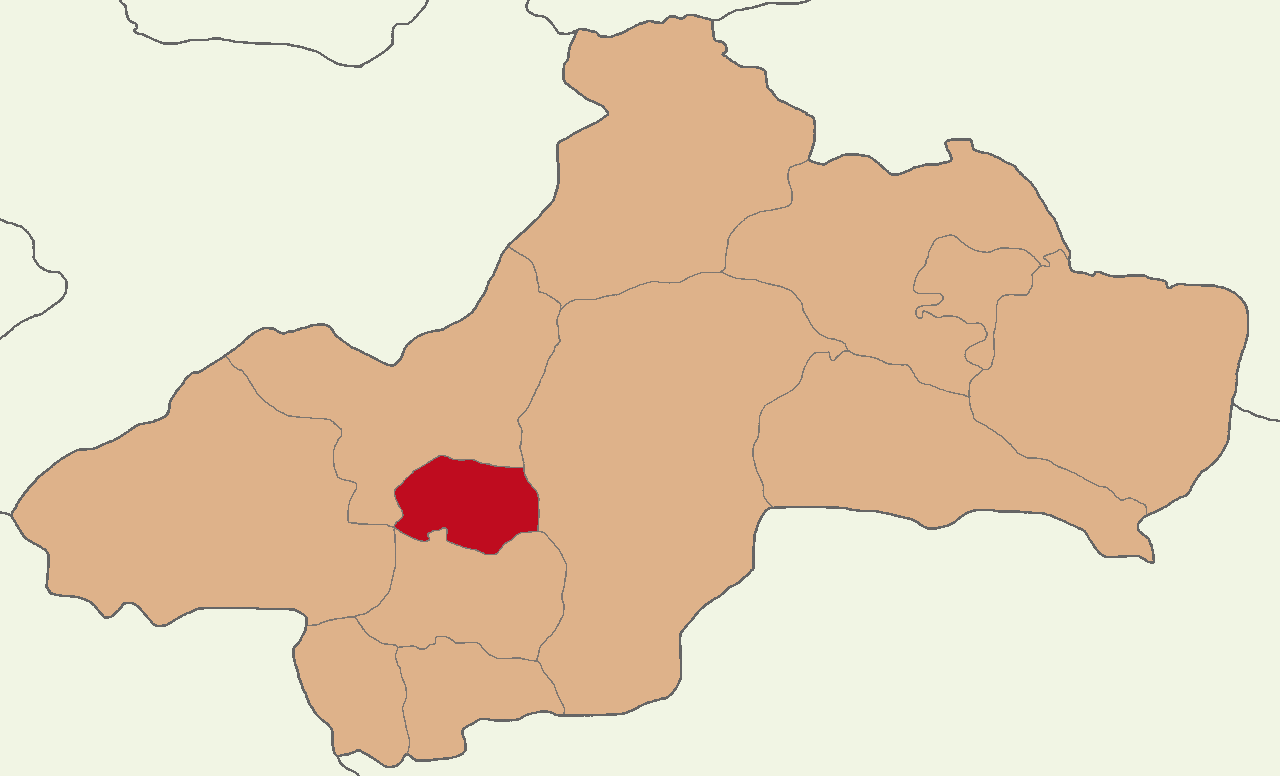
- Map showing Pazar District in Tokat Province

- Location in Turkey
- Coordinates: 40°16′N 36°19′E
- Country: Turkey
- Province: Tokat
- Seat: Pazar

Government
  - Kaymakam: Mehmet Miraç Demir
- Area: 188 km^{2} (73 sq mi)
- Population (2022): 12,843
  - Density: 68/km^{2} (180/sq mi)
- Time zone: UTC+3 (TRT)
- Website: www.tokatpazar.gov.tr

Pazar District is a district of the Tokat Province of Turkey. Its seat is the town of Pazar. Its area is 188 km^{2}, and its population is 12,843 (2022).

== Composition ==
There are two municipalities in Pazar District:

- Pazar
- Üzümören

There are 16 villages in Pazar District:

- Bağlarbaşı
- Ballıca
- Beşevler
- Çayköy
- Çiftlikköy
- Dereçaylı
- Dereköy
- Doğancalı
- Kaledere
- Menteşe
- Ocaklı
- Ovacık
- Ovayurt
- Taşlık
- Tatarköy
- Tepeçaylı
