= Başçiftlik District =

District of Tokat Province, Turkey

- District
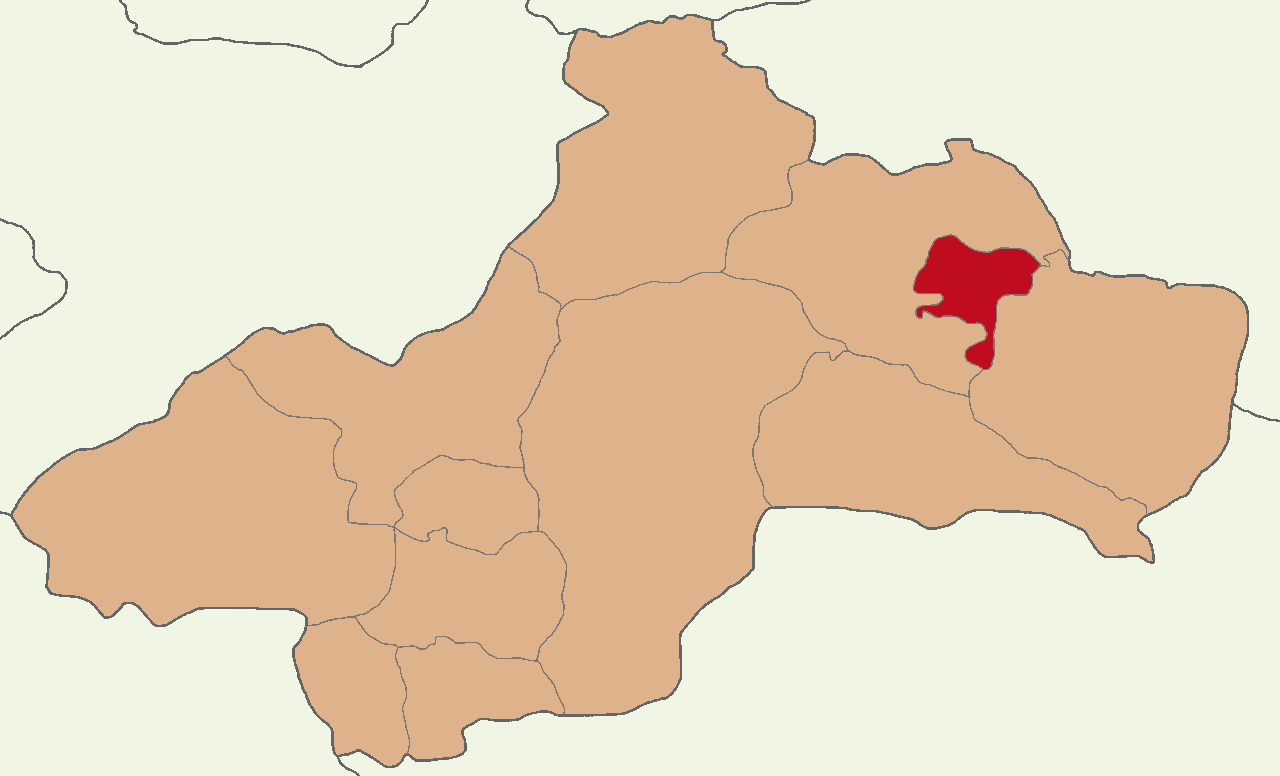
- Map showing Başçiftlik District in Tokat Province

- Location in Turkey
- Coordinates: 40°33′N 37°10′E
- Country: Turkey
- Province: Tokat
- Seat: Başçiftlik

Government
  - Kaymakam: Serhat Bağcı
- Area: 246 km^{2} (95 sq mi)
- Population (2022): 6,097
  - Density: 25/km^{2} (64/sq mi)
- Time zone: UTC+3 (TRT)
- Website: www.basciftlik.gov.tr

Başçiftlik District is a district of the Tokat Province of Turkey. Its seat is the town of Başçiftlik. Its area is 246 km^{2}, and its population is 6,097 (2022).

== Composition ==
There are two municipalities in Başçiftlik District:

- Başçiftlik
- Hatipli

There are 6 villages in Başçiftlik District:

- Alanköy
- Aydoğmuş
- Dağüstü
- Erikbelen
- Şahnaalan
- Sarıağıl
