= Reşadiye District =

District of Tokat Province, Turkey

- District
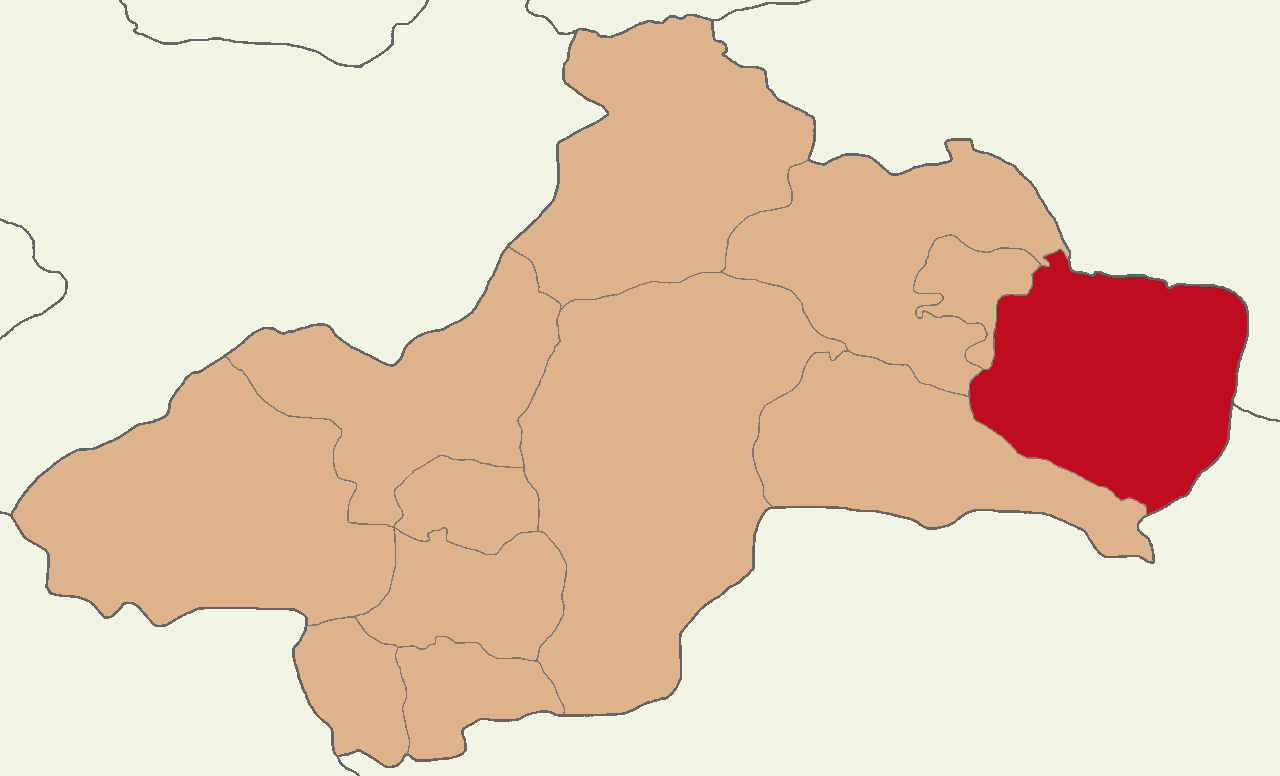
- Map showing Reşadiye District in Tokat Province

- Location in Turkey
- Coordinates: 40°23′N 37°20′E
- Country: Turkey
- Province: Tokat
- Seat: Reşadiye

Government
  - Kaymakam: Talat Tabur
- Area: 1,102 km^{2} (425 sq mi)
- Population (2022): 32,600
  - Density: 29.6/km^{2} (76.6/sq mi)
- Time zone: UTC+3 (TRT)
- Website: www.resadiye.gov.tr

Reşadiye District is a district of the Tokat Province of Turkey. Its seat is the town of Reşadiye. Its area is 1,102 km^{2}, and its population is 32,600 (2022).

== Geography ==
The highest hill of Reşadiye District is Erdem Baba Hill with 2,183 meters. This is followed by Küçük Erdem Hill (2,113 meters), Kabaktepe (2,037 meters), Çal Hill (2,022 meters), Mektep Hill, Tömbül Hill and Lalelik Hill. All of these heights are located in Günüş Mountain. Zinav Lake is located within the boundaries of the district.

== Composition ==
There are 6 municipalities in Reşadiye District:

- Baydarlı
- Bereketli
- Bozçalı
- Cimitekke
- Hasanşeyh
- Reşadiye

There are 76 villages in Reşadiye District:

- Abdurrahmanlı
- Akdoğmuş
- Bağdatlı
- Bayırbaşı
- Beşdere
- Bostankolu
- Büşürüm
- Çakırlı
- Çakmak
- Çambalı
- Çamlıkaya
- Çatköy
- Çavuşbeyli
- Çayırpınar
- Cemel
- Çevrecik
- Çınarcık
- Dalpınar
- Danişment
- Darıdere
- Demircili
- Doğantepe
- Dolay
- Döllük
- Dutdibi
- Elmacık
- Esenköy
- Eymir
- Eyüp
- Gökköy
- Gölburnu
- Göllüköy
- Gülkonak
- Güllüce
- Güneygölcük
- Gurbetli
- Güvenlik
- Güzeldere
- Hebüllü
- İbrahimşeyh
- İslamlı
- İsmailiye
- Kabalı
- Kapaklı
- Karacaağaç
- Karataş
- Karlıyayla
- Karşıkent
- Kaşpınar
- Keteniği
- Kızılcaören
- Köklü
- Konakköy
- Kuyucak
- Kuzbağı
- Kuzgölcük
- Muratkaya
- Nebişeyh
- Özen
- Özlüce
- Saraykışla
- Sarıyayla
- Sazak
- Soğukpınar
- Taşlıca
- Toklar
- Tozanlıfındıcak
- Uğurlu
- Umurca
- Yağsiyan
- Yeni Darıderesi
- Yenituraç
- Yeşilyurt
- Yoğunpelit
- Yolüstü
- Yuvacık
