= Erbaa District =

District of Tokat Province, Turkey

- District
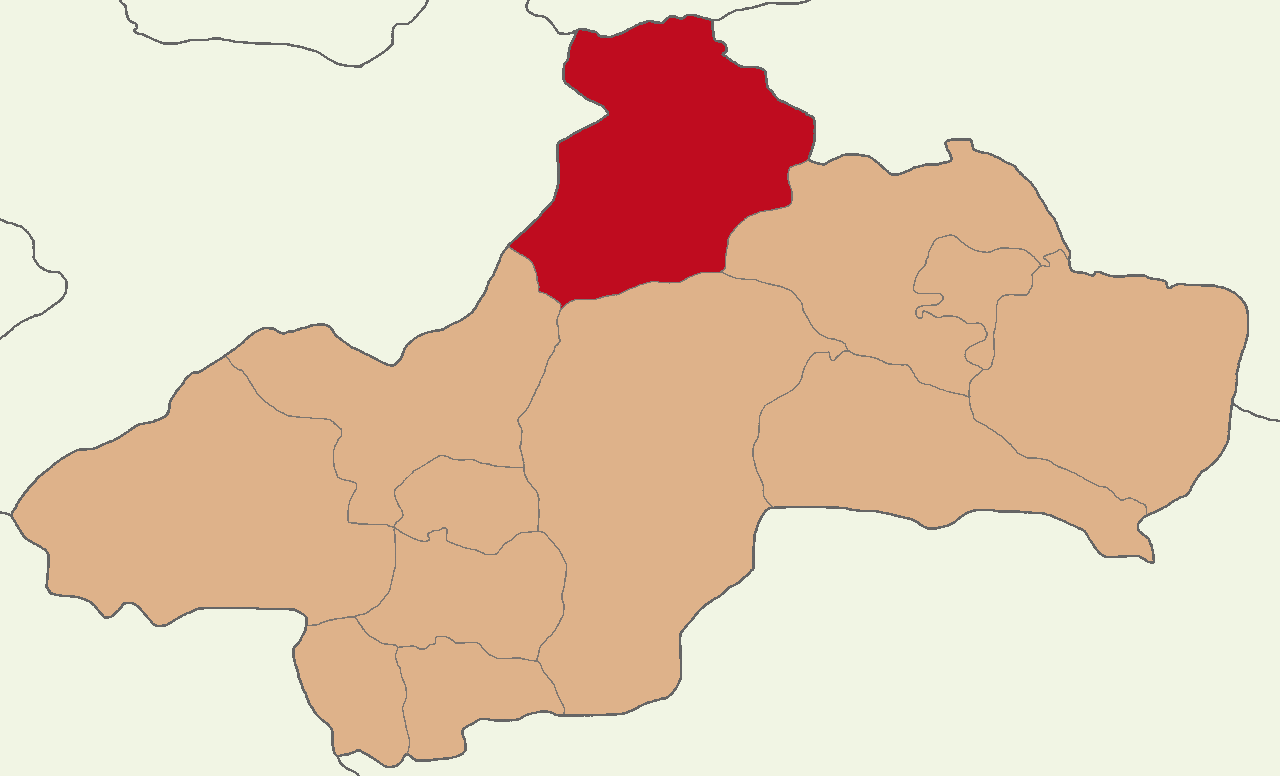
- Map showing Erbaa District in Tokat Province

- Location in Turkey
- Coordinates: 40°40′N 36°34′E
- Country: Turkey
- Province: Tokat
- Seat: Erbaa

Government
  - Kaymakam: İsmail Altan Demirayak
- Area: 1,173 km^{2} (453 sq mi)
- Population (2022): 100,382
  - Density: 85.58/km^{2} (221.6/sq mi)
- Time zone: UTC+3 (TRT)
- Website: www.erbaa.gov.tr

Erbaa District is a district of the Tokat Province of Turkey. Its seat is the city of Erbaa. Its area is 1,173 km^{2}, and its population is 100,382 (2022).

== Composition ==
There are four municipalities in Erbaa District:

- Erbaa
- Gökal
- Karayaka
- Tanoba

There are 74 villages in Erbaa District:

- Ağcaalan
- Ağcakeçi
- Akça
- Akgün
- Alanköy
- Aşağıçandır
- Ayan
- Aydınsofu
- Bağpınar
- Ballıbağ
- Benli
- Beykayası
- Çakır
- Çalkara
- Çamdibi
- Canbolat
- Çatalan
- Çeşmeli
- Çevresu
- Cibril
- Değirmenli
- Demirtaş
- Doğanyurt
- Dokuzçam
- Endekpınar
- Engelli
- Erdemli
- Ermeydanı
- Eryaba
- Evciler
- Ezebağı
- Fındıcak
- Fındıcak
- Gölönü
- Gümüşalan
- Güveçli
- Hacıali
- Hacıbükü
- Hacıpazar
- İkizce
- İverönü
- Kaleköy
- Karaağaç
- Kartosman
- Kavalcık
- Keçeci
- Kınıkgüney
- Kızılçubuk
- Koçak
- Kozlu
- Küplüce
- Kurtuluş
- Kuzköy
- Madenli
- Meydandüzü
- Narlıdere
- Ocakbaşı
- Oğlakçı
- Ortaköy
- Pınarbeyli
- Salkımören
- Sokutaş
- Şükür
- Tandırlı
- Tepekışla
- Tosunlar
- Ustamehmet
- Üzümlü
- Yaylacık
- Yaylalı
- Yoldere
- Yukarıçandır
- Yurtalan
- Zoğallıçukur
