= Reşadiye shooting =

Kurdish attack on Turkish soldiers

- Part of the Kurdish–Turkish conflict
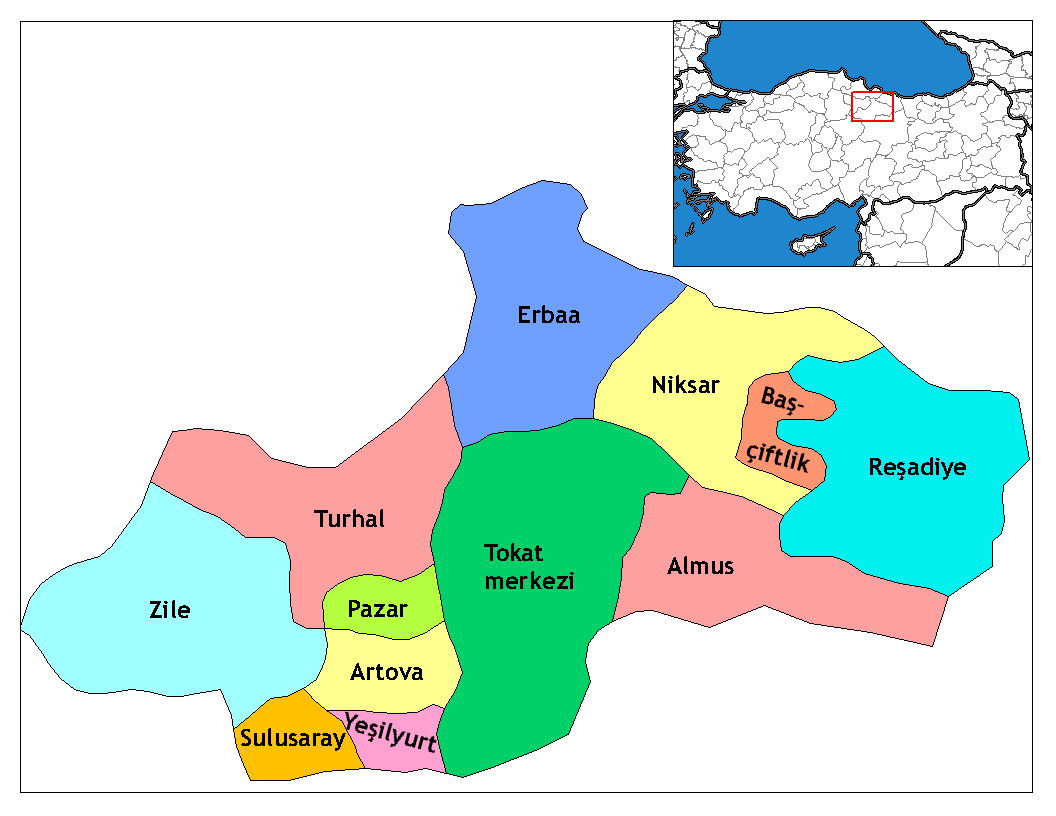
- Districts of Tokat province
Date	7 December 2009
Location	Reşadiye, Tokat Province, Turkey

Belligerents
Turkey	Kurdistan Workers' Party (PKK)

Commanders and leaders
(Turkey) Harun Aslanbaş †	Celal Başkale

Strength
	7

Casualties and losses
7 killed, 3 injured	None

The Reşadiye shooting was an ambush that took place on December 7, 2009, at Reşadiye, Tokat Province, Turkey. Unidentified gunmen ambushed a Turkish patrol, killing seven soldiers and wounding three others. It was the region's deadliest attack in more than a decade, since the Sazak assault in 1997; and most recent attack in Turkey since April, 2009 when a remote-controlled bomb set by Kurdish militants killed 10 soldiers in the country's southeast. The last major attack in Tokat was in 2001.

The ambush occurred as Turkey's Prime Minister Recep Tayyip Erdogan was received in Washington, D.C., by U.S. President Barack Obama and occurred the day before a court was due to consider outlawing Turkey's Democratic Society Party (DTP), the largest Kurdish party in the country. The threat of parliamentary resignations and a potential election lingered in the air. The Turkish army said on their website that they would maintain a presence in the area.

== The attack ==
The attack occurred as gendarmerie troops embarked on a patrol mission using a military vehicle. They were in a mountainous region with thick fog when they were attacked using rocket launchers. Early reports indicated the deaths of five or six soldiers and ten more were wounded. It was later confirmed that seven were dead and three were wounded. One of the wounded soldiers was officially listed as in critical condition. Six of the dead were privates; the other was a sergeant.

The Kurdistan Workers' Party (PKK) claimed responsibility on 10 December 2009, according to the Fırat news agency. The Doğa news agency stated that the ambush was carried out by seven individuals led by Celal Başkale, or "Mahir".

== Aftermath ==
The seven dead soldiers were identified as Sgt. Harun Aslanbaş and privates Onur Bozdemir, Kemal Pide, Ferit Demir, Yakup Mutlu, Cengiz Sarıbaş and Fatih Yonca. The funeral of the soldiers the following day attracted hundreds of mourners. Some shouted anti-PKK comments aloud. The dead were later buried in their hometowns. The Association to Serve All Families of Martyrs complained about the Democratic Society Party and how it had been "encouraging people to hate and hostility" and waved flags at an Ankara courthouse.

An investigation by the Reşadiye Chief Public Prosecutor's Office showed that the local village headman, Hidayet İ, was a secret informant of the PKK and had tipped them off about the soldiers leaving Reşadiye. Hidayet İ turned out to be a double agent, who had been an informant to the Gendarmerie, the PKK and the DHKP-C.

== Reaction ==
The Swedish Presidency of the Council of the European Union expressed its wish in a statement "that the perpetrators will be brought to justice as soon as possible" and reminded Turkey it had the EU's full support "in the fight against terrorism".

Turkish daily Hürriyet suggested reports from Washington, D.C., indicated "it was obvious the prime minister was shocked with the sad news he received".

== See also ==
- Sazak assault
