= Sazak assault =

Coordinated communist attack in Turkey

- Part of Kurdish–Turkish conflict and DHKP/C insurgency in Turkey
Date	1997
Location	Reşadiye, Tokat Province, Turkey
Result	PKK ambush succeeded

Belligerents
Turkey	PKK; DHKP/C; TKP-ML

Casualties and losses
4 killed	None

The Sazak assault was an ambush carried out in 1997, in the Sazak neighbourhood of Reşadiye, in Turkey's Tokat Province. Four Turkish soldiers were killed in the ambush and although no group immediately claimed responsibility, the attack was later revealed to have been a joint operation by three Communist guerrilla groups: the Kurdistan Workers' Party (PKK) and the Turkish Revolutionary People's Liberation Party–Front (DHKP-C) and Communist Party of Turkey/Marxist–Leninist (TKP-ML).

The soldiers were returning to their outpost after a patrol and had only 1.3 kilometers left to travel when they were ambushed by a joint force of Kurdish PKK and Turkish DHKP-C and TKP-ML insurgents. Four soldiers were killed in the ambush and due to the heavy fog, all insurgents managed to escape.

That same year period the PKK and DHKP-C were also involved in a joint attack on a local flour factory in Tokat, which killed 3 Turkish officials. Twelve years later, a similar attack was carried out in the same area, which left 7 soldiers dead and 3 injured.

== See also ==
- Reşadiye shooting
