= Paul of Neocaesarea =

Saint Paul of Neocæsarea

Bishop of Neocæsarea
- Born: Neocæsarea
- Died: 4th century AD
- Venerated in: Eastern Orthodox Church; Greek Catholic Church
- Feast: December 23

Paul of Neocæsarea, also known as Saint Paul, Bishop of Neocæsarea, was an early Christian bishop best known for demonstrating the scars of his religious persecution under the emperor Licinius at the First Council of Nicaea in AD 325.

At his trial under Licinius, Orthodox tradition holds that Paul firmly declared his faith and was subjected to beatings, starvation, and mutilation. According to Theodoret, Paul "had been deprived of the use of both hands by the application of a red hot iron by which the nerves which give motion to the muscles had been contracted and destroyed."

After Licinius was executed in the year 324, when Constantine the Great became the sole ruler of the Roman Empire, and Christians in prison received their freedom, Paul was released. It was then that he participated at the Council of Nicaea. At the end of the Council, the Emperor Constantine received the Council participants and kissed Paul's burned and crippled hands.

His feast is on December 23 in the Orthodox Church.
