= Tokat District =

District of Tokat Province, Turkey

- District
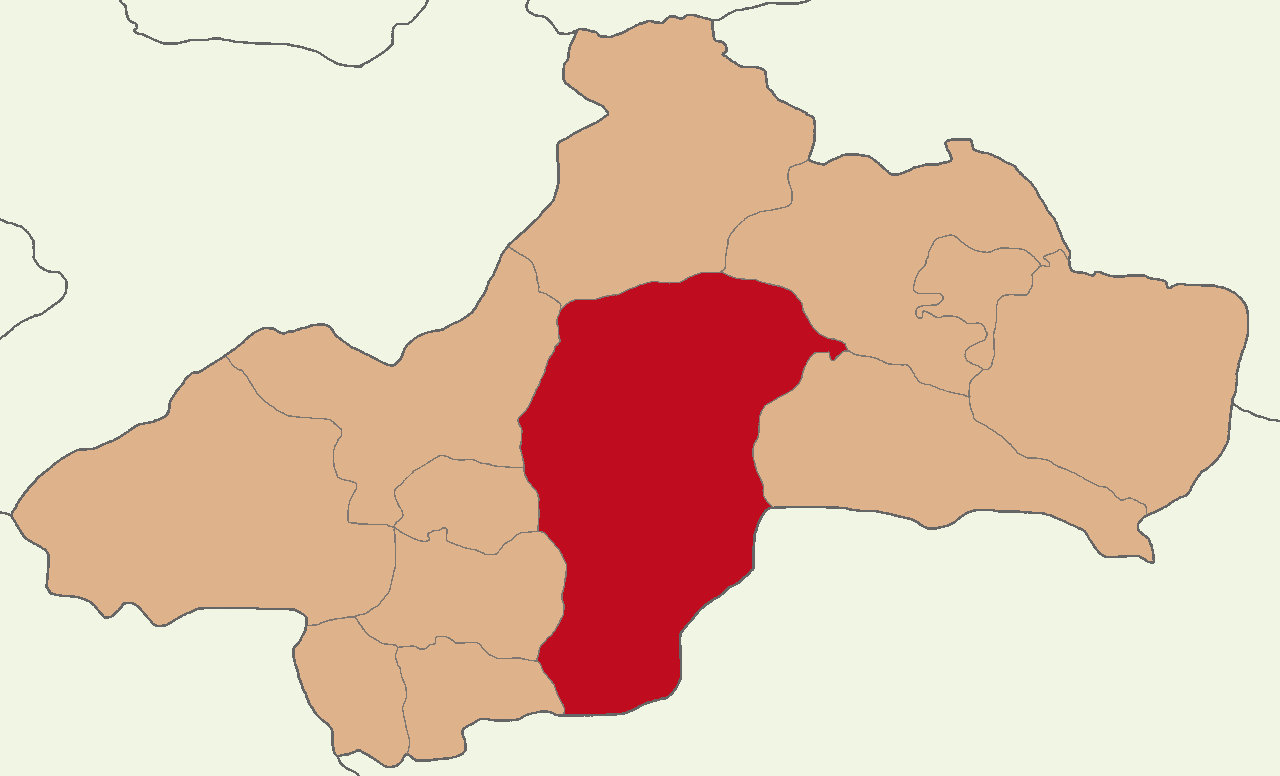
- Map showing Tokat District in Tokat Province

- Location in Turkey
- Coordinates: 40°19′N 36°33′E
- Country: Turkey
- Province: Tokat
- Seat: Tokat
- Area: 2,003 km^{2} (773 sq mi)
- Population (2022): 206,621
  - Density: 100/km^{2} (270/sq mi)
- Time zone: UTC+3 (TRT)

Tokat District (also: Merkez, meaning "central" in Turkish) is a district of the Tokat Province of Turkey. Its seat is the city of Tokat. Its area is 2,003 km^{2}, and its population is 206,621 (2022).

== Composition ==
There are five municipalities in Tokat District:

- Çamlıbel
- Çat
- Emirseyit
- Güryıldız
- Tokat

There are 107 villages in Tokat District:

- Acıpınar
- Ahmetalan
- Akbelen
- Akyamaç
- Akyurt
- Alanköy
- Altıntaş
- Aluç
- Aşağıfırındere
- Avlunlar
- Avşarağzı
- Aydınca
- Aydoğdu
- Bağbaşı
- Bakışlı
- Ballıdere
- Batmantaş
- Bedirkale
- Beşören
- Binecek
- Boyalı
- Bulaköy
- Büyük Bağlar
- Büyükyıldız
- Çamağzı
- Çamaltı
- Çamdere
- Çamlık
- Çatalkaya
- Çayören
- Çerçi
- Çerdiğin
- Çökelikkışla
- Çördük
- Çöreğibüyük
- Çubuklu
- Dayılıhacı
- Dedeli
- Dereağzı
- Derekışla
- Dereyaka
- Dodurga
- Döllük
- Efeköy
- Ekincik
- Eskiköy
- Eze
- Gaziosmanpaşa
- Gökçe
- Gökçeyol
- Gökdere
- Gölcük
- Gözova
- Güğümlü
- Gülpınar
- Gümenek
- Günçalı
- Günevi
- Güzelce
- Güzeldere
- Halilalan
- Hanpınar
- Hasanbaba
- İhsaniye
- Kabakboğazı
- Kadıvakfı
- Karakaya
- Kargın
- Kargıncık
- Kemalpaşa
- Kervansaray
- Keşlik
- Killik
- Kızık
- Kızılkaya
- Kızılköy
- Kızılöz
- Kocacık
- Kömeç
- Küçük Bağlar
- Madas
- Mülkköy
- Musullu
- Nebiköy
- Ormanbeyli
- Ortaören
- Pınarlı
- Sarıtarla
- Şehitler
- Semerci
- Şenköy
- Sevindik
- Sırçalı
- Söngüt
- Tahtoba
- Taşlıçiftlik
- Tekneli
- Uğrak
- Ulaş
- Yağmurlu
- Yakacık
- Yatmış
- Yayladalı
- Yazıbaşı
- Yelpe
- Yenice
- Yeşilyurt
