= Niksar District =

District of Tokat Province, Turkey

- District
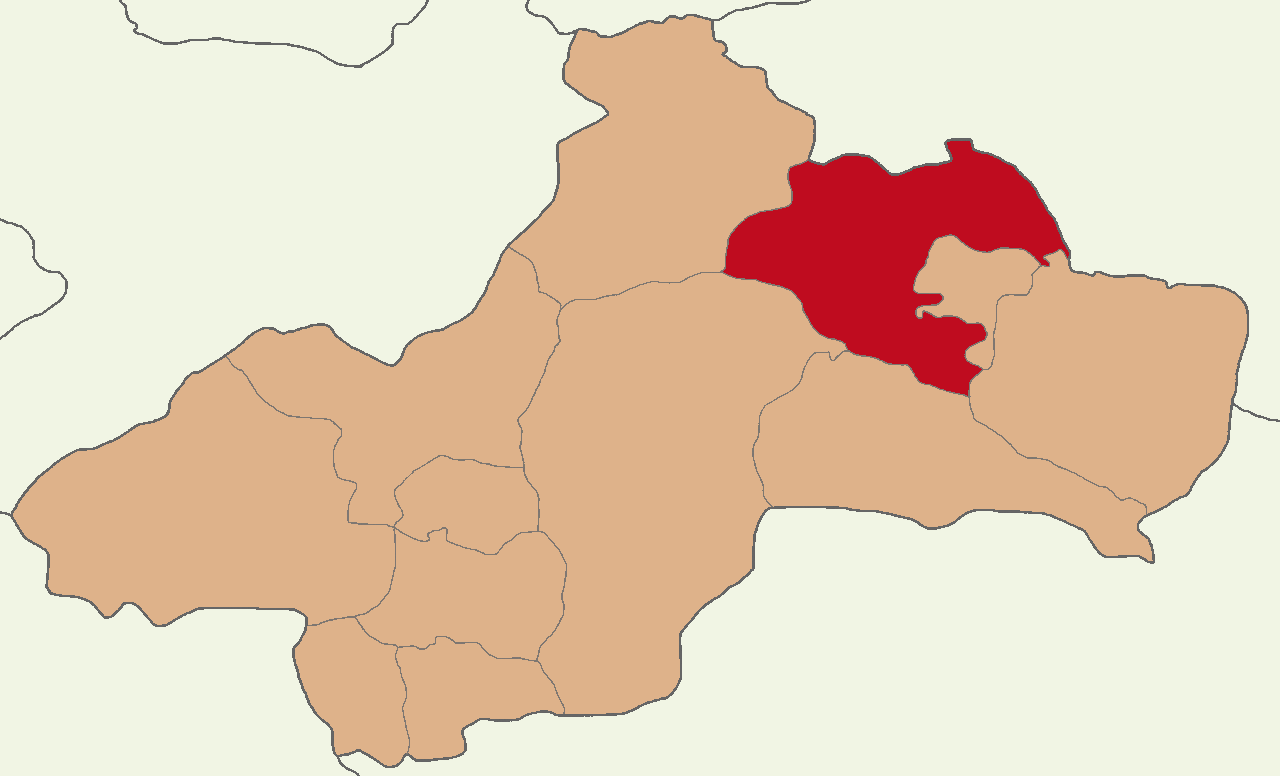
- Map showing Niksar District in Tokat Province

- Location in Turkey
- Coordinates: 40°35′N 36°58′E
- Country: Turkey
- Province: Tokat
- Seat: Niksar

Government
  - Kaymakam: İlhami Doğan
- Area: 889 km^{2} (343 sq mi)
- Population (2022): 62,052
  - Density: 69.8/km^{2} (181/sq mi)
- Time zone: UTC+3 (TRT)
- Website: www.niksar.gov.tr

Niksar District is a district of the Tokat Province of Turkey. Its seat is the town of Niksar. Its area is 889 km^{2}, and its population is 62,052 (2022).

== Composition ==
There are 6 municipalities in Niksar District:

- Gökçeli
- Gürçeşme
- Niksar
- Serenli
- Yazıcık
- Yolkonak

There are 83 villages in Niksar District:

- Akgüney (Sele)
- Akıncı
- Araköy
- Ardıçlı
- Arıpınar (Gözekse)
- Arpaören (Ceğ)
- Asar
- Ayvalı
- Bayraktepe (Fel)
- Beyçayırı (Huruçayırı)
- Bilgili (Elmüdül)
- Boyluca (Ereç)
- Bozcaarmut
- Budaklı (Huru)
- Büyükyurt (Coc)
- Çalca
- Camidere
- Çatak
- Çayköy
- Cerköy
- Çiçekli (Şidibe)
- Çimenözü (Kekün)
- Dalkaya (Gidiver)
- Derindere
- Direkli (Efkerit)
- Edilli (Avdileğ)
- Eryaba
- Esence (Ehen)
- Eyneağzı
- Geritköyü
- Geyikgölü
- Gökçeoluk (İbiski)
- Güdüklü
- Gülbayır (Zera)
- Gülebi (Özdemir)
- Ğültepe
- Günebakan
- Günlüce (İpsimara)
- Güvenli (Buhanı)
- Güzelyayla
- Hacılı
- Hanyeri
- Hüseyingazi (Tis)
- Işıklı (Tenevli)
- Kapıağzı
- Karabodur
- Karakaş
- Kaşıkçı
- Kiracı
- Köklüce (Fatlı)
- Korulu (Leis)
- Kümbetli
- Kuyucak
- Mahmudiye
- Mercimekdüzü
- Mezraa
- Muhtardüzü
- Musapınarı
- Mutluca (Kazalapa)
- Oluklu (Pörekli)
- Örenler
- Ormancık (Duvadere)
- Osmaniye
- Özalan
- Özveren
- Pelitlik
- Şahinli
- Sarıyazı (Onan-Yağan)
- Şeyhler
- Sorkun
- Sulugöl
- Tahtalı
- Teknealan (Leğen)
- Tepeyatak
- Terzioğlu
- Umurlu (Mağman)
- Ustahasan
- Yalıköy (Karakuş-Hosaf)
- Yarbaşı
- Yeşilhisar (Abdalkolu)
- Yeşilkaya (Eynesür)
- Yeşilköy
- Yeşilyurt
