= Erbaa =

- Municipality
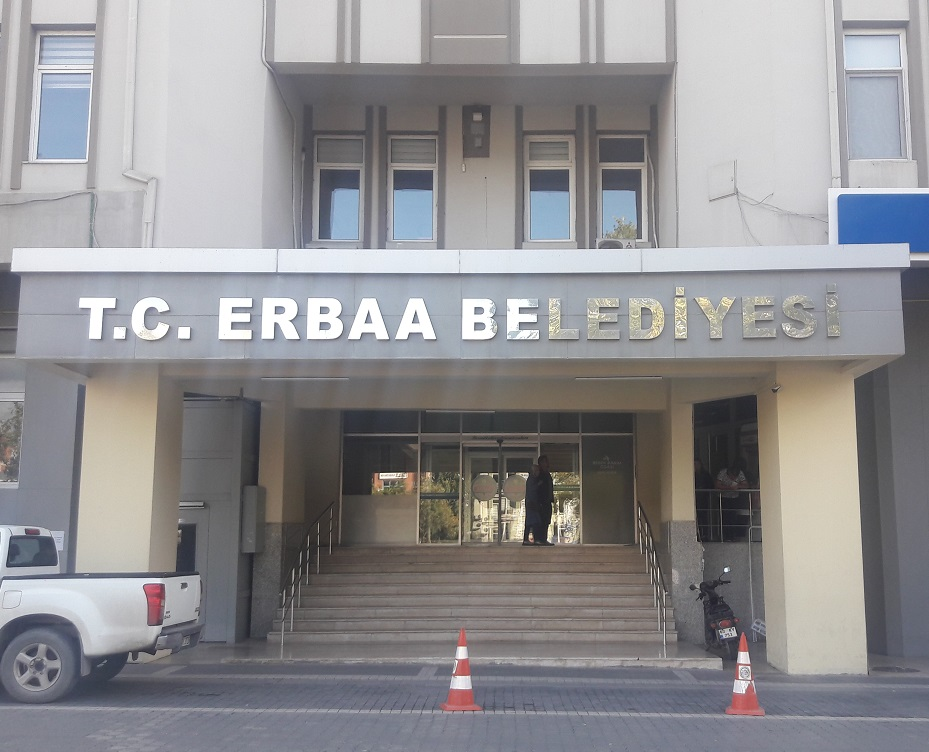
- Municipal building of Erbaa

- Coat of arms

- Location within Turkey
- Coordinates: 40°40′28″N 36°34′5″E
- Country: Turkey
- Province: Tokat
- District: Erbaa

Government
  - Mayor: Ertuğrul Karagöl (MHP)
- Elevation: 320 m (1,050 ft)
- Population (2022): 75,210
- Time zone: UTC+3 (TRT)
- Postal code: 60500
- Area code: 0356
- Website: www.erbaa.bel.tr

Erbaa is a town in Tokat Province in the Black Sea region of Turkey. It is the seat of Erbaa District. Its population is 75,210 (2022). The town of Erbaa lies on the left bank of the Kelkit River and is surrounded by the Erbaa Plain, most of which lies in its district.

One kilometer east-southeast of Erbaa is the archaeological site of Horoztepe.

== Etymology ==
The name "Erbaa" means "four" in Arabic. According to the official records of the Ottoman Empire, this name started to be used beginning from the early 18th century. The name was also used as "Nevah-i Erbaa", which literally means "four towns". It refers to the period when the most important settlements between Niksar and Amasya, namely Erek, Karayaka, Sonusa (Uluköy), and Taşâbat (Taşova) were collectively named as Nevah-i Erbaa or "four towns" as they were in the same region and close to one another. Even the accrued taxes of the time were recorded in this name. In 1840, the taxes collected from these four towns were registered to be 47,243 kuruş.

Erbaa came to be used as a general name for Erek, Karayaka, Sonusa, and Taşâbat and was regarded as a district. The name Kaza-i Erbaa, or Erbaa District was also used during the Ottoman Empire. As the town of Erek developed more than the others over time, it became a district in 1872 and took the name Erbaa on its own and the others, Taşâbat, Karayaka and Sonusa became the villages of Erek, or today's Erbaa. Later, in 1944, when Taşabat or today's Taşova became a separate district, Sonusa was also annexed to Taşova.

== Notable people ==
- Kotza Anastas, guerrilla leader coordinating the Greek resistance during the Greek genocide
