= Cimitekke =

- Municipality
- Location in Turkey
- Coordinates: 40°29′41″N 37°25′26″E
- Country: Turkey
- Province: Tokat
- District: Reşadiye
- Population (2022): 2,069
- Time zone: UTC+3 (TRT)

Cimitekke is a town (belde) in the Reşadiye District, Tokat Province, Turkey. Its population is 2,069 (2022).
