= Saint Almus =

- Born: Scotland
- Died: 1270; Scotland
- Venerated in: Roman Catholic Church
- Feast: 28 June

Almus, also known as Alme, Alanus, was a Cistercian abbot. Almus entered religious life as a monk at Melrose Abbey, Scotland, before being appointed abbot at Balmerino Abbey.
