= Niksar =

- Municipality
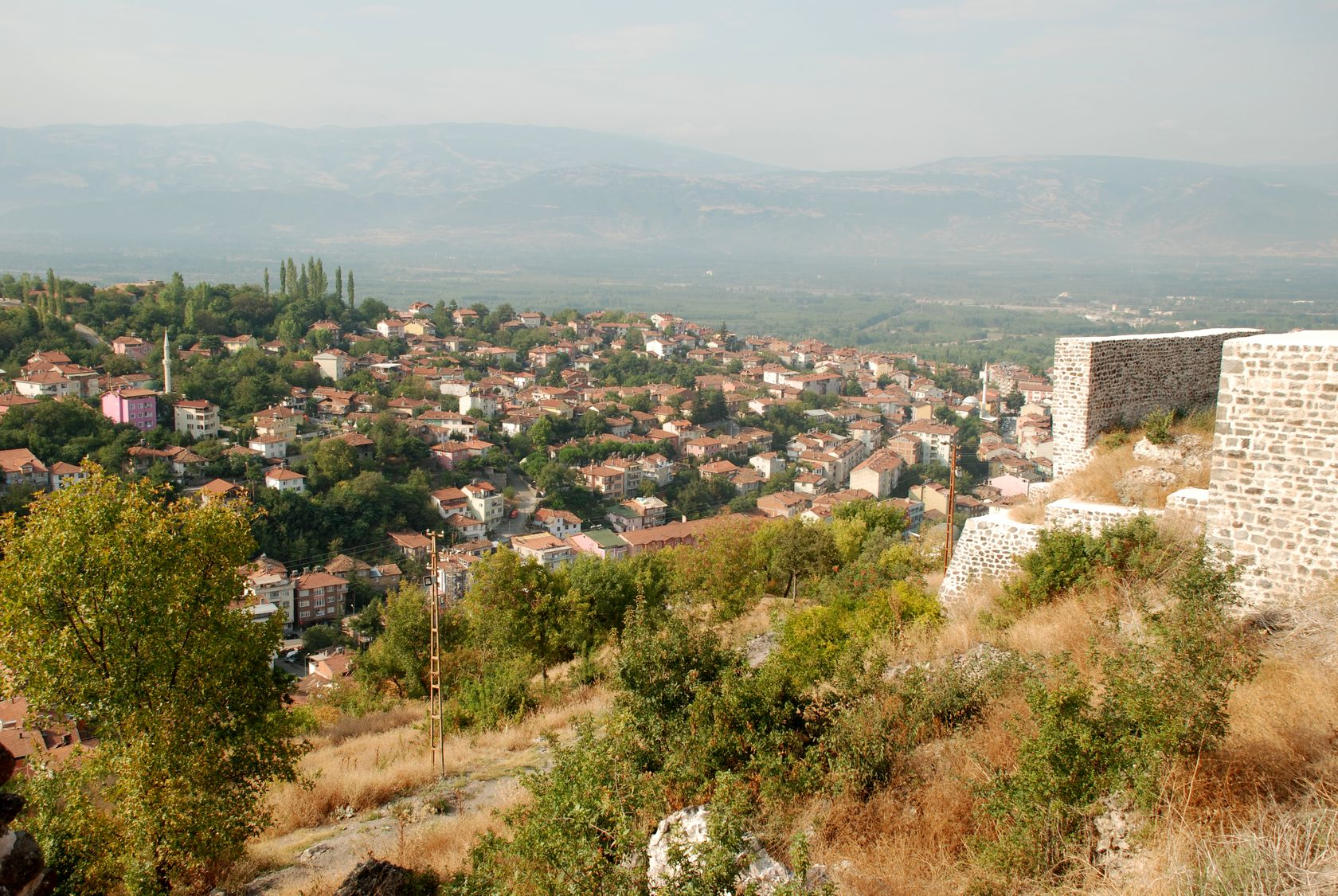
- Niksar view from the city center

- Logo

- Location within Turkey
- Country: Turkey
- Province: Tokat
- District: Niksar

Government
  - Mayor: Semih Tepebaşı (AKP)
- Population (2022): 37,017
- Time zone: UTC+3 (TRT)
- Postal code: 60600
- Area code: 0356
- Website: www.niksar.bel.tr

Niksar, historically known as Neocaesarea (Νεοκαισάρεια), is a city in Tokat Province, Turkey. It is the seat of Niksar District. Its population is 37,017 (2022). It was settled by many empires. Niksar is known as "Çukurova of North-Anatolia" due to its production of many kinds of fruits and vegetables. On May 2, 2018, Niksar was included in the World Heritage tentative list.

== History ==
Niksar has been ruled by the Hittite, Persian, Greek, Pontic, Roman, Byzantine, Danishmend, Seljuk and Ottoman Empires. It has always been an important place in Anatolia because of its location, climate and productive farmland.

It was known as Cabira in the Hellenistic period (Κάβειρα in Greek). It was one of the favourite residences of Mithridates VI, who built a palace there, and later of King Polemon I and his successors.

In 72 or 71 BCE, the Battle of Cabira during the Third Mithridatic War took place at Cabira, and the city passed to the Romans. Niksar was called Diospolis, Sebaste, and Neokaisareia during the Roman period. Pompey made it a city and gave it the name of Diopolis, while Pythodoris, widow of Polemon, made it her capital and called it Sebaste. It is not known precisely when it assumed the name of Neocaesarea, mentioned for the first time in Pliny, "Hist. Nat.", VI, III, 1, but judging from its coins, one might suppose that it was during the reign of Tiberius. In 344 the city was completely destroyed by an earthquake Neocaesarea became part of the Eastern Roman Empire when the Roman Empire divided into two parts in AD 395. Another earthquake occurred in 499, the 499 Nicopolis earthquake.

During the Middle Ages, the Muslims and Christians disputed the possession of Neocaesarea, and in 1068 a Seljuk general, Melik-Ghazi, whose tomb is still visible, captured and pillaged it. When the Seljuqs raided Anatolia in 1067, Neocaesarea was conquered by Afşın Bey, one of the commanders of Alp Arslan. The Byzantines retook the area in 1068. Conquered by Artuk Bey after the Battle of Manzikert, Neocæsarea once again returned to Byzantium in 1073. The city became part of the domain of Roussel de Bailleul, a Norman mercenary who had rebelled against the Byzantine empire, and who held the town until 1075. Melik Gümüştekin Ahmet Gazi (better known as Danishmend Gazi), founder of the Danishmend, was the next conqueror of Neocaesarea. After the conquest the Gazi made it his capital city, and, under the name Niksar, became a center of science and culture. The Danishmend Gazi's mausoleum stands in a large cemetery just outside the town.

In 1100, Bohemond I of Taranto was held prisoner in Niksar castle until 1103.

By 1175, during the reign of Kılıç Arslan II, Niksar was dependent on the Seljuks of Rum. After the Mongol invasion of the 13th century, Niksar was governed by the Eretnids and then the Beylik of Tacettin, a beylik and became the center of the latter principality. After Kadı Burhanettin (who conquered Niksar in 1387) was killed in battle, the people of Niksar sought aid from the Ottoman Sultan Bayezid I. The Sultan's son, Süleyman Çelebi, took Niksar for the Ottomans. In the later Ottoman period, Niksar became part of Tokat Province. Fatih Mehmet launched a raid on Trabzon from Niksar, and Selim I and Suleiman the Magnificent raided the east from there. The town was predominantly Muslim in the mid 17th century.

== Ecclesiastical history ==
Neocaesarea was an episcopal see in the late Roman province of Pontus Polemoniacus. At first called Cabira, it became the civil and religious metropolis of Pontus. In around 315, the Synod of Neo-Caesarea was held there. It is now one of the bishoprics listed in the Annuario Pontificio as titular sees and is referred to as Neocaesarea in Ponto to distinguish it from Neocaesarea in Syria.

=== Bishops ===
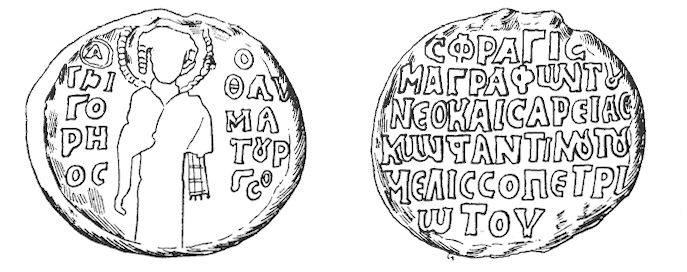
Seal of Constantine Melissopetriotes, Metropolitan of Neocaesarea, 11th-12th century

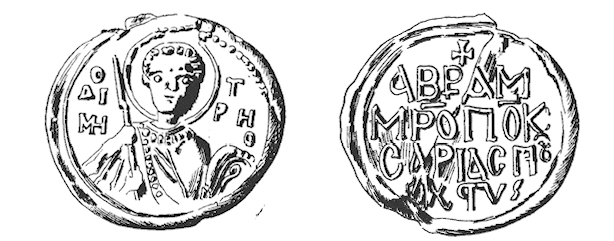
Seal of Abraham Chrysostomos, Metropolitan of Neocaesarea, 11th-12th century

Noted bishops include Saints Gregory Thaumaturgus, Paul of Neocaesarea, and Thomas, a 9th-century martyr.

Gregory of Nyssa claimed that about 240, when Gregory Thaumaturgus was consecrated bishop of his native city, Neocæsarea had only seventeen Christians and that at his death (270) it counted only seventeen pagans. In 315 a great council was held there, the acts of which are still extant. In the early church baptism was generally by immersion. Baptism by perfusion, that is by pouring the water over the candidate, was permitted in the case of the seriously ill and where sufficient water for immersion was unobtainable or impractical, as in, for example, prisons. The Council of Neocaesarea ruled that individuals baptized by perfusion were disqualified from being presbyters. This became an issue in the case of Novatian, who had received baptism by perfusion when dangerously ill.

Being early placed at the head of an ecclesiastical province, Neocæsarea had four suffragan sees about 640 ("Ecthesis" of pseudo-Epiphanius, ed. Heinrich Gelzer, 539), retaining them until the tenth century, when Trebizond obtained its independence and, by degrees, the other three suffragans were suppressed. In 1391 the Archdiocese of Neocaesarea was confided to the metropolitan of Trebizond (Miklosich and Müller, "Acta", II, 154). About 1400 there was, however, a regular metropolitan (op. cit., II, 312), residing at Ordu. Among the twenty-seven bishops of this city mentioned by Le Quien, the most noted are Saints Gregory Thaumaturgus, Paul of Neocaesarea, and Thomas, a 9th-century martyr.

== Geographic location ==
Niksar is approximately 9,555 km^{2} (3,689 sq mi). It is located at 40°35' north latitude and 36°58' east longitude. Its average altitude is 350 m above sea level. It is surrounded by Erbaa on the northwest, Tokat on the southwest, Almus on the south, Başçiftlik on the southeast and Akkuş on the north. It is one of the five largest counties of Tokat. The Canik Mountains are to the north, Dönek Mountain to the south, and the Niksar Lowland is situated between these mountains. The Niksar Lowland is one of the most important lowlands of the Black Sea Region. The Canik Mountains are covered with plateaus that lie parallel to the Black Sea. Çamiçi High Plateau is one of the most important ones.

Niksar lands are irrigated by large and small tributaries of the Kelkit River. Forests cover 53% of the plateau, and pasture 12%; 32% of the land is devoted to agriculture, and only 3% is unsuitable for farming. Beech, pine, horn beech, and spruce trees can be found in the higher altitudes to the north of Niksar. In the lowlands there are poplar and willow trees, and fruit trees in the valleys. Polecats, rabbits, wolves, foxes, lynxes, bears, and pigs are the main hunting animals that live in the mountains and forests. Partridges, quail and ducks are among the more important game birds found here. Niksar has a transitional oceanic climate and continental climate. It is generally cold and snowy in winter, and hot and moderately dry in summer.

== Cuisine of Niksar ==
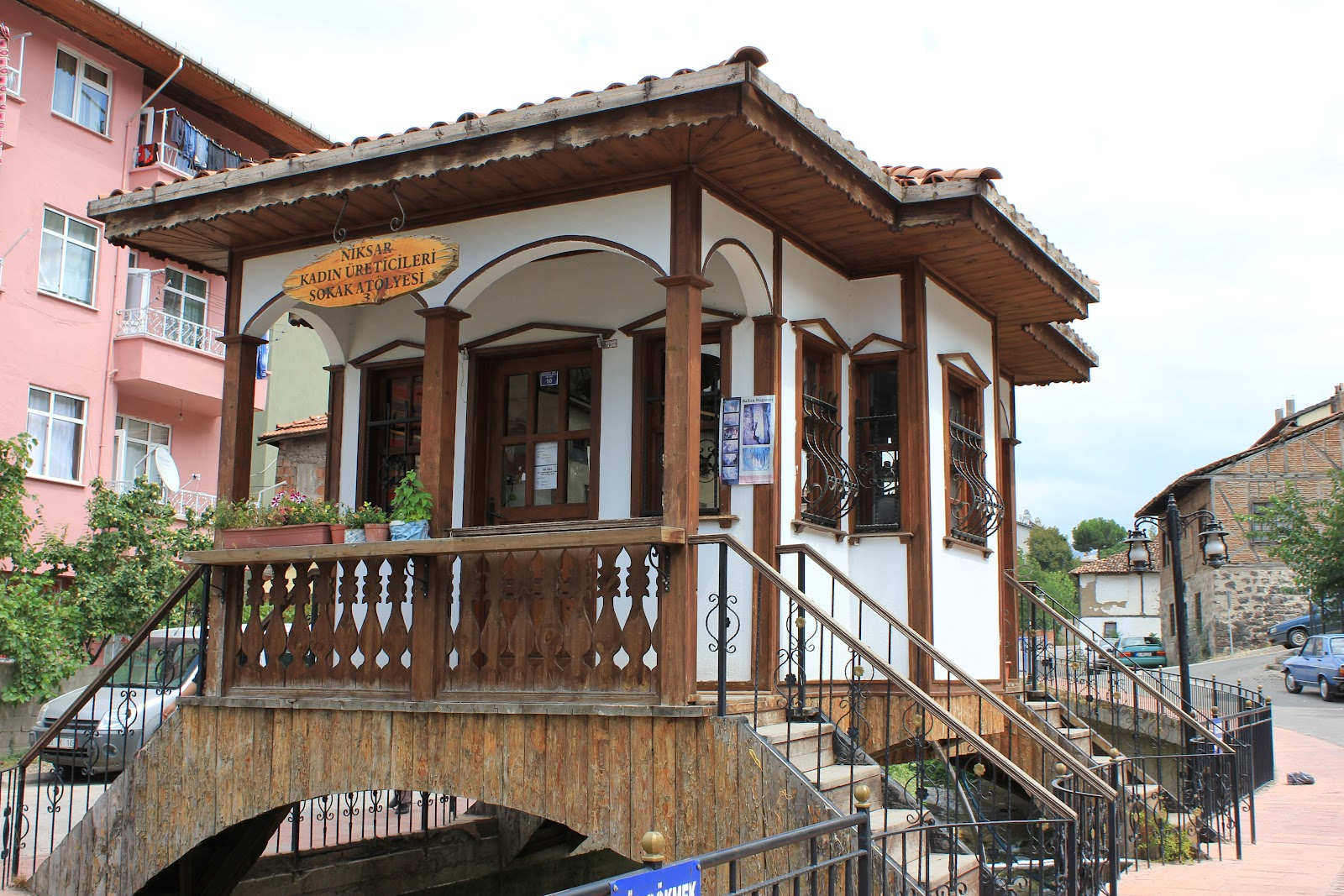
Historic house

The most remarkable feature of traditional Tokat-Niksar houses is the kitchen. Called Aşevi or Aşgana in the local dialect, the kitchen is usually the largest room of the house and serves as a sort of lounge for the family. The typical kitchen has a fireplace on one side used for cooking or washing and a storeroom on the other in which dried foods, preserves, sauces, cheese and grape leaves are kept. Beside the storeroom is a wooden granary with partitions for storing cereals and legumes. In Turkey, it is common to eat meals around a low table.

The famous local foods of Niksar are walnut, tomato paste and grape leaves which is a main ingredient of dolma, a very popular dish in Turkey.

== Places of interest ==
- Çamiçi High Plateau

== Bibliography ==
- The entry cites:
  - William Smith, Dictionary of Greek and Roman Geography (London, 1870), I, 462, II, 418, s. v. Cabira and Neocaesareia;
  - Le Quien, Michel (1740). Oriens Christianus, in quatuor Patriarchatus digestus: quo exhibentur ecclesiæ, patriarchæ, cæterique præsules totius Orientis. Tomus primus: tres magnas complectens diœceses Ponti, Asiæ & Thraciæ, Patriarchatui Constantinopolitano subjectas (in Latin). Paris: Ex Typographia Regia. cols. 499–508. OCLC 955922585.
  - CUINET, La Turquie d'Asie, I (Paris, 1892), 733-35;
  - CUMONT, Studia Pontica
