= Çamiçi High Plateau =

Çamiçi High Plateau Niksar Çamiçi Yaylası
- Neighborhood
- Location of Çamiçi High Plateau in Turkey
- Coordinates: 40.63816°N 36.97858°E
- Country: Turkey
- Region: Black Sea
- Province: Tokat
- District: Niksar
- Elevation: 1,350 m (4,430 ft)
- Time zone: UTC+3 (EEST)
- Postal code: 60600
- Area code: 0-356

Çamiçi High Plateau (Turkish: Niksar Çamiçi Yaylası) is a mountain resort at a high plateau located in Niksar district of Tokat Province, Turkey.

Çamiçi High Plateau is situated 16 km (9.9 mi) north of Niksar, taking about 26 minutes to reach. The place is covered by dense pine wood, and takes its name (literally "In the Pine Wood") from the vegetation. Its average elevation is 1,350 m (4,430 ft). It is a preferred tourist destination due to its relatively cool climate in the summer. The temperature difference between the district center Niksar and the high plateau can reach over 10 °C (50 °F).

There are nearly 800 households at the high plateau. The location features a motel, ten wooden cabins to rent, a 60 daa (6.0 ha) camping park for 25 caravans and 100 tents, It offers outdoor activities like orienteering and paragliding. A festival is held yearly at the high plateau.
