= Bereketli, Reşadiye =

Bereketli
- Municipality
- Location in Turkey
- Coordinates: 40°30′47″N 37°17′22″E
- Country: Turkey
- Province: Tokat
- District: Reşadiye
- Population (2022): 3,438
- Time zone: UTC+3 (TRT)

Bereketli is a town (belde) in the Reşadiye District, Tokat Province, Turkey. Its population is 3,438 (2022).
