= Akarçay Görümlü =

- Municipality
- Location in Turkey
- Coordinates: 40°21′51″N 37°02′11″E
- Country: Turkey
- Province: Tokat
- District: Almus
- Population (2022): 2,414
- Time zone: UTC+3 (TRT)

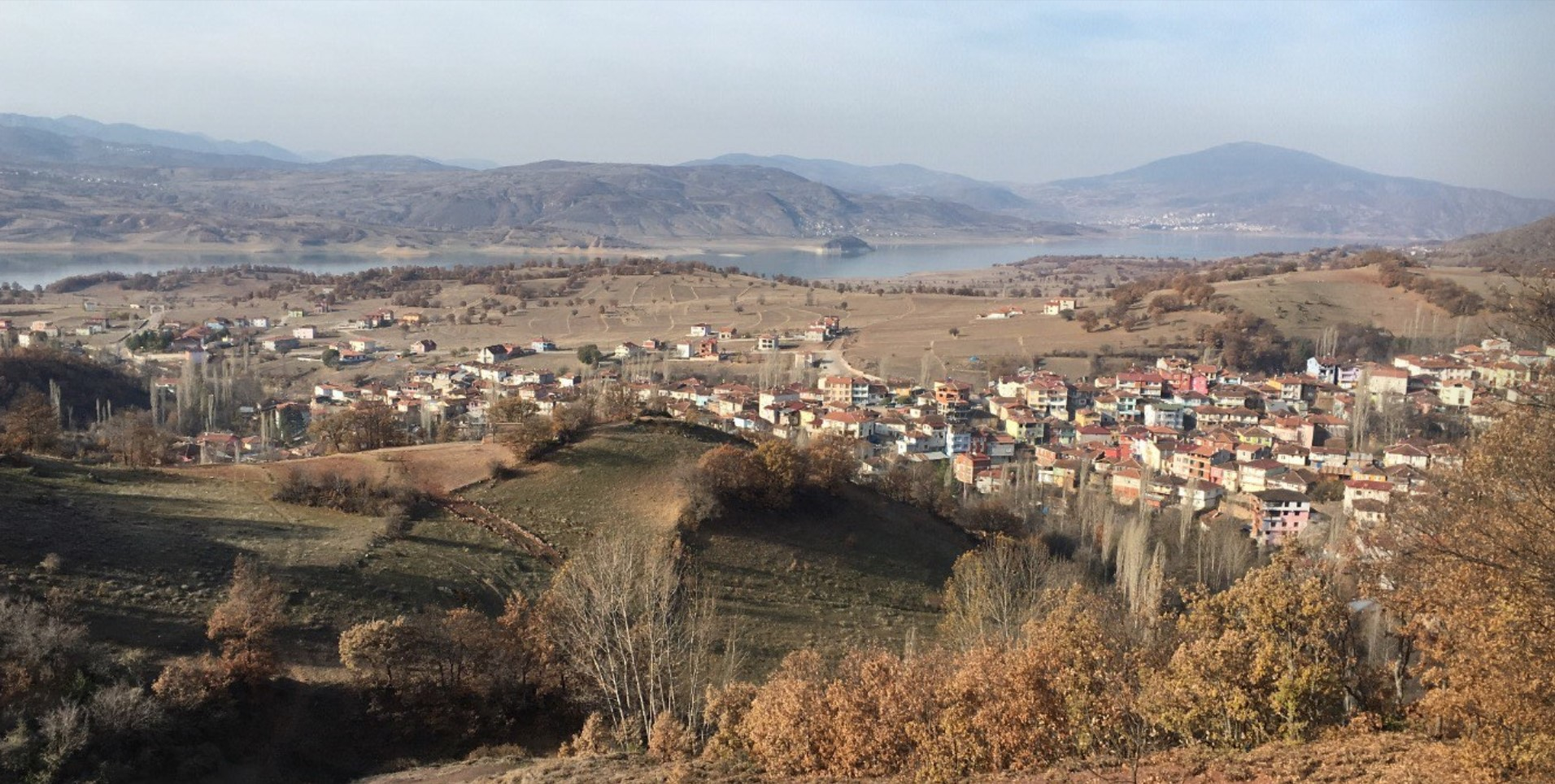
Akarçay Görümlü, Tokat, Turkey

Akarçay Görümlü is a town (belde) in the Almus District, Tokat Province, Turkey. Its population is 2,414 (2022).
