= Çamlıbel, Tokat =

Çamlıbel
- Municipality
- Location in Turkey
- Coordinates: 40°05′12″N 36°28′37″E
- Country: Turkey
- Province: Tokat
- District: Tokat
- Population (2022): 3,586
- Time zone: UTC+3 (TRT)

Çamlıbel is a town (belde) in the Tokat District, Tokat Province, Turkey. Its population is 3,586 (2022).
