= Gökçeli, Niksar =

Gökçeli
- Municipality
- Location in Turkey
- Coordinates: 40°35′06″N 36°44′05″E
- Country: Turkey
- Province: Tokat
- District: Niksar
- Population (2022): 2,258
- Time zone: UTC+3 (TRT)

Gökçeli is a town (belde) in the Niksar District, Tokat Province, Turkey. Its population is 2,258 (2022).
