= Hasanşeyh, Reşadiye =

Hasanşeyh
- Municipality
- Location in Turkey
- Coordinates: 40°28′29″N 37°27′25″E
- Country: Turkey
- Province: Tokat
- District: Reşadiye
- Population (2022): 3,124
- Time zone: UTC+3 (TRT)

Hasanşeyh is a town (belde) in the Reşadiye District, Tokat Province, Turkey. Its population is 3,124 (2022).
