= Hatipli, Başçiftlik =

Hatipli
- Municipality
- Location in Turkey
- Coordinates: 40°32′40″N 37°13′32″E
- Country: Turkey
- Province: Tokat
- District: Başçiftlik
- Population (2022): 1,800
- Time zone: UTC+3 (TRT)

Hatipli is a town (belde) in the Başçiftlik District, Tokat Province, Turkey. Its population is 1,800 (2022).
