= Üzümören =

- Municipality
- Location in Turkey
- Coordinates: 40°14′10″N 36°11′40″E
- Country: Turkey
- Province: Tokat
- District: Pazar
- Population (2022): 3,636
- Time zone: UTC+3 (TRT)

Üzümören is a town (belde) in the Pazar District, Tokat Province, Turkey. Its population is 3,636 (2022).
