= Gölgeli, Almus =

Gölgeli
- Municipality
- Location in Turkey
- Coordinates: 40°18′52″N 37°02′12″E
- Country: Turkey
- Province: Tokat
- District: Almus
- Population (2022): 2,054
- Time zone: UTC+3 (TRT)

Gölgeli is a town (belde) in the Almus District, Tokat Province, Turkey. Its population is 2,054 (2022).
