= Pazar, Tokat =

Pazar
- Municipality
- Location in Turkey
- Coordinates: 40°15′43″N 36°18′47″E
- Country: Turkey
- Province: Tokat
- District: Pazar

Government
  - Mayor: Erdoğan Yılmaz (AKP)
- Population (2022): 4,615
- Time zone: UTC+3 (TRT)
- Area code: 0356
- Website: www.tokatpazar.bel.tr

Pazar is a town in Tokat Province in the Black Sea region of Turkey. It is the seat of Pazar District. Its population is 4,615 (2022). The mayor is Erdoğan Yılmaz (AKP).
