= Almus Dam =

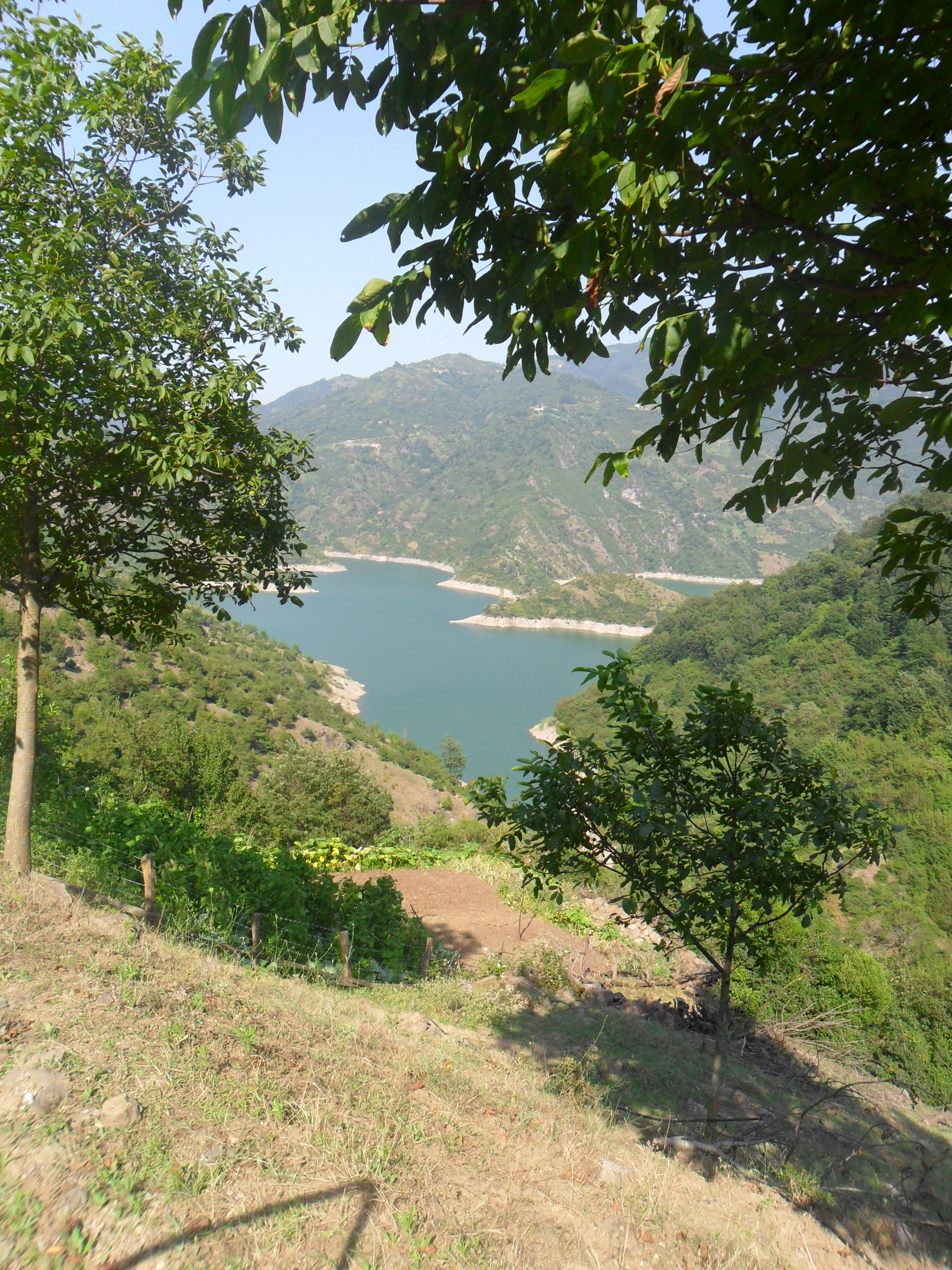
- Almus Dam

- Location within Turkey
- Official name: Almus Dam & Hydroelectricity Station
- Location: Almus
- Coordinates: 40°24′27″N 36°54′11″E
- Opening date: 1966
- Operator: State Hydraulic Works

Dam and spillways
- Impounds: Kelkit River
- Height: 78 m (256 ft)
- Length: 454 m (1,490 ft)

Reservoir
- Creates: Almus Reservoir
- Total capacity: 950,000,000 m^{3} (3.4×10^{10} ft^{3})
- Catchment area: 31 km^{2} (12 mi^{2})
- Surface area: 26,650 acres (108 km^{2})

Power Station
- Turbines: 3 x 9 MW
- Installed capacity: 27 MW
- Annual generation: 99,000 MWh

Almus Dam (Almus Barajı in Turkish) is an earthen embankment dam that is near the town of Almus (28 kilometers East of Tokat city in center north of Turkey) and is located on the River Yesilirmak which runs into the Black Sea. The main purposes of the dam are irrigation, flood control and hydroelectricity. The hydroelectric power plant (established in 1966) at the dam has a capacity of 27 megawatts (three facilities at 9 megawatts each). The dam contains 3,405,000 m^{3} (120,200,000 ft^{3}) of material and irrigates an area of 21,350 hectares. The dam's spillway is capable of discharging a maximum 2,800 m^{3}/s (98,881 cu ft/s) and its bottom outlet a maximum of 50 m^{3}/s (1,766 cu ft/s).
