= Gökal =

- Municipality
- Location in Turkey
- Coordinates: 40°50′53″N 36°41′32″E
- Country: Turkey
- Province: Tokat
- District: Erbaa
- Population (2022): 3,391
- Time zone: UTC+3 (TRT)

Gökal is a town (belde) in the Erbaa District, Tokat Province, Turkey. Its population is 3,391 (2022).
