= Tanoba =

- Municipality
- Location in Turkey
- Coordinates: 40°39′04″N 36°24′04″E
- Country: Turkey
- Province: Tokat
- District: Erbaa
- Population (2022): 4,752
- Time zone: UTC+3 (TRT)

Tanoba is a town (belde) in the Erbaa District, Tokat Province, Turkey. Its population is 4,752 (2022).
