= Yolkonak, Niksar =

Yolkonak
- Municipality
- Location in Turkey
- Coordinates: 40°32′42″N 36°53′23″E
- Country: Turkey
- Province: Tokat
- District: Niksar
- Population (2022): 2,606
- Time zone: UTC+3 (TRT)

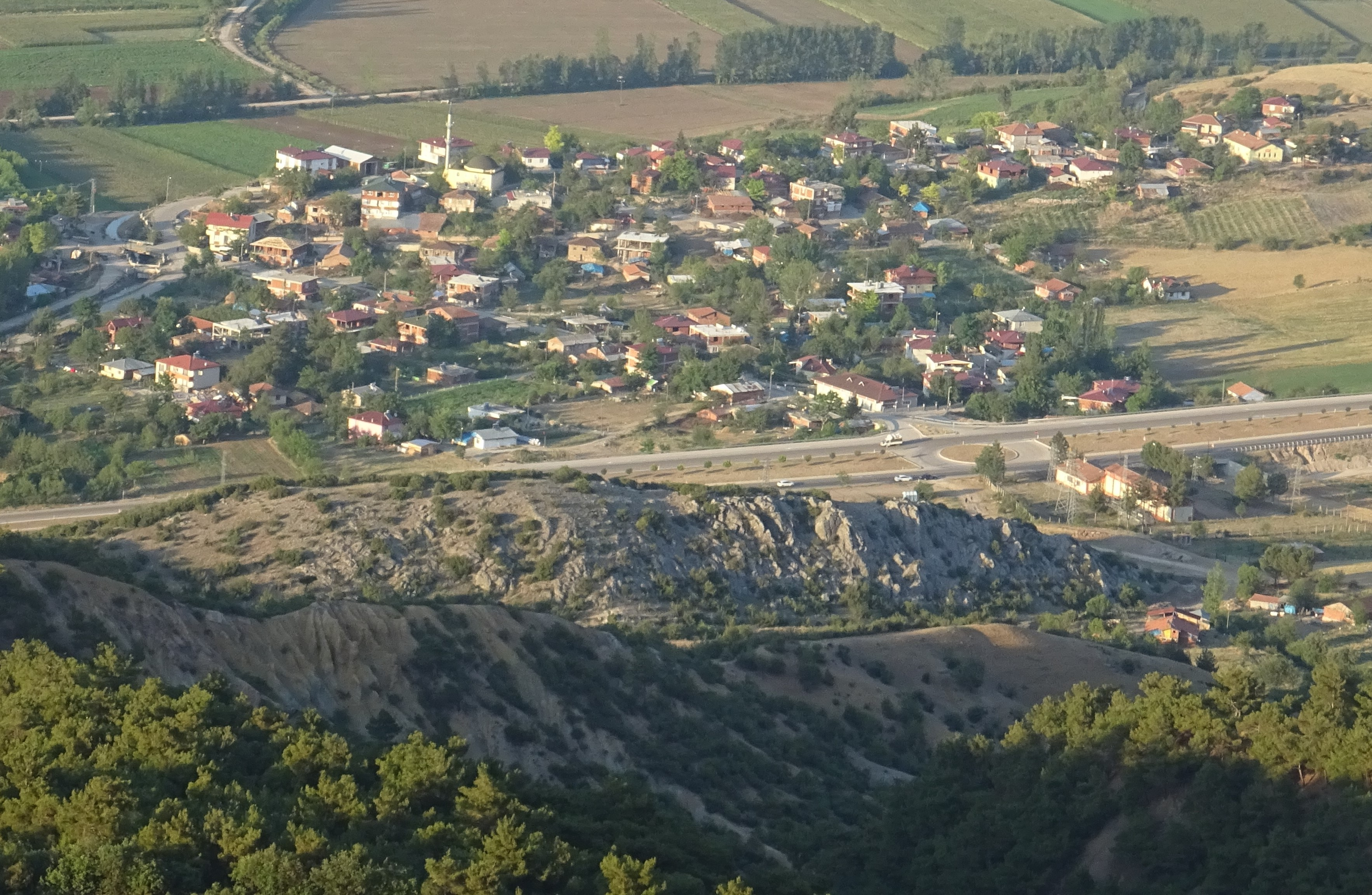
A view from Yolkonak

Yolkonak is a town (belde) in the Niksar District, Tokat Province, Turkey. Its population is 2,606 (2022). The town is populated by Kurds.
