= Bozçalı, Reşadiye =

Bozçalı
- Municipality
- Location in Turkey
- Coordinates: 40°32′36″N 37°17′42″E
- Country: Turkey
- Province: Tokat
- District: Reşadiye
- Population (2022): 3,390
- Time zone: UTC+3 (TRT)

Bozçalı is a town (belde) in the Reşadiye District, Tokat Province, Turkey. Its population is 3,390 (2022).
