= Güryıldız =

- Municipality
- Location in Turkey
- Coordinates: 40°21′N 36°21′E
- Country: Turkey
- Province: Tokat
- District: Tokat
- Elevation: 710 m (2,330 ft)
- Population (2022): 2,045
- Time zone: UTC+3 (TRT)
- Postal code: 60240
- Area code: 0356

Güryıldız is a town (belde) in the Tokat District, Tokat Province, Turkey. Its population is 2,045 (2022). It is situated to the south of Black Sea Mountains and to the west of Tokat. The distance to Tokat is 23 kilometres (14 mi). The settlement was founded by Ahıska Turks from east. In 1999 it was declared a seat of township. Tomato and grape are the main crops of the town.
