= Gürçeşme, Niksar =

Gürçeşme
- Municipality
- Location in Turkey
- Coordinates: 40°34′27″N 36°48′16″E
- Country: Turkey
- Province: Tokat
- District: Niksar
- Population (2022): 3,119
- Time zone: UTC+3 (TRT)

Gürçeşme is a town (belde) in the Niksar District, Tokat Province, Turkey. Its population is 3,119 (2022).
