= Yazıcık, Niksar =

Yazıcık
- Municipality
- Location in Turkey
- Coordinates: 40°28′42″N 37°06′49″E
- Country: Turkey
- Province: Tokat
- District: Niksar
- Population (2022): 2,728
- Time zone: UTC+3 (TRT)

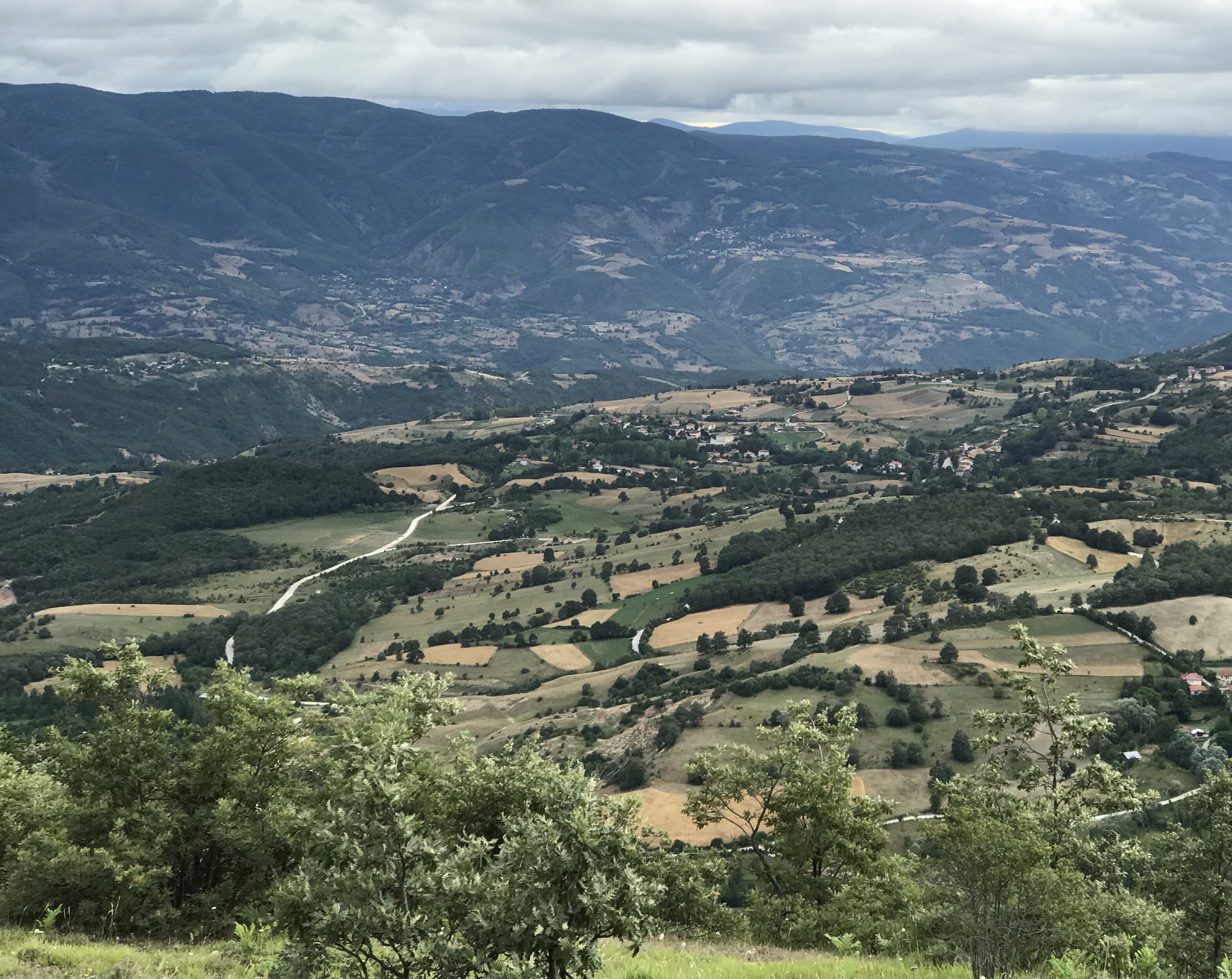
Yazicik, Niksar

Yazıcık is a town (belde) in the Niksar District, Tokat Province, Turkey. Its population is 2,728 (2022).
