= Çat, Tokat =

Çat
- Municipality
- Location in Turkey
- Coordinates: 40°16′40″N 36°43′08″E
- Country: Turkey
- Province: Tokat
- District: Tokat
- Population (2022): 3,791
- Time zone: UTC+3 (TRT)

Çat is a town (belde) in the Tokat District, Tokat Province, Turkey. Its population is 3,791 (2022).
