= Ataköy, Almus =

Ataköy
- Municipality
- Location in Turkey
- Coordinates: 40°26′52″N 36°55′12″E
- Country: Turkey
- Province: Tokat
- District: Almus
- Population (2022): 2,644
- Time zone: UTC+3 (TRT)

Ataköy is a town (belde) in the Almus District, Tokat Province, Turkey. Its population is 2,644 (2022).
