= Serenli, Niksar =

Serenli
- Municipality
- Location in Turkey
- Coordinates: 40°39′42″N 36°52′13″E
- Country: Turkey
- Province: Tokat
- District: Niksar
- Population (2022): 2,859
- Time zone: UTC+3 (TRT)

Serenli is a town (belde) in the Niksar District, Tokat Province, Turkey. Its population is 2,859 (2022).
