= Kınık, Almus =

Kınık
- Municipality
- Location in Turkey
- Coordinates: 40°18′56″N 36°54′19″E
- Country: Turkey
- Province: Tokat
- District: Almus
- Population (2022): 2,116
- Time zone: UTC+3 (TRT)

Kınık is a town (belde) in the Almus District, Tokat Province, Turkey. Its population is 2,116 (2022).
