= Çevreli, Almus =

Çevreli
- Municipality
- Location in Turkey
- Coordinates: 40°17′48″N 36°51′23″E
- Country: Turkey
- Province: Tokat
- District: Almus
- Population (2022): 2,593
- Time zone: UTC+3 (TRT)

Çevreli is a town (belde) in the Almus District, Tokat Province, Turkey. Its population is 2,593 (2022).
