= Baydarlı, Turkey =

Baydarlı
- Municipality
- Location in Turkey
- Coordinates: 40°29′44″N 37°29′38″E
- Country: Turkey
- Province: Tokat
- District: Reşadiye
- Population (2022): 2,309
- Time zone: UTC+3 (TRT)

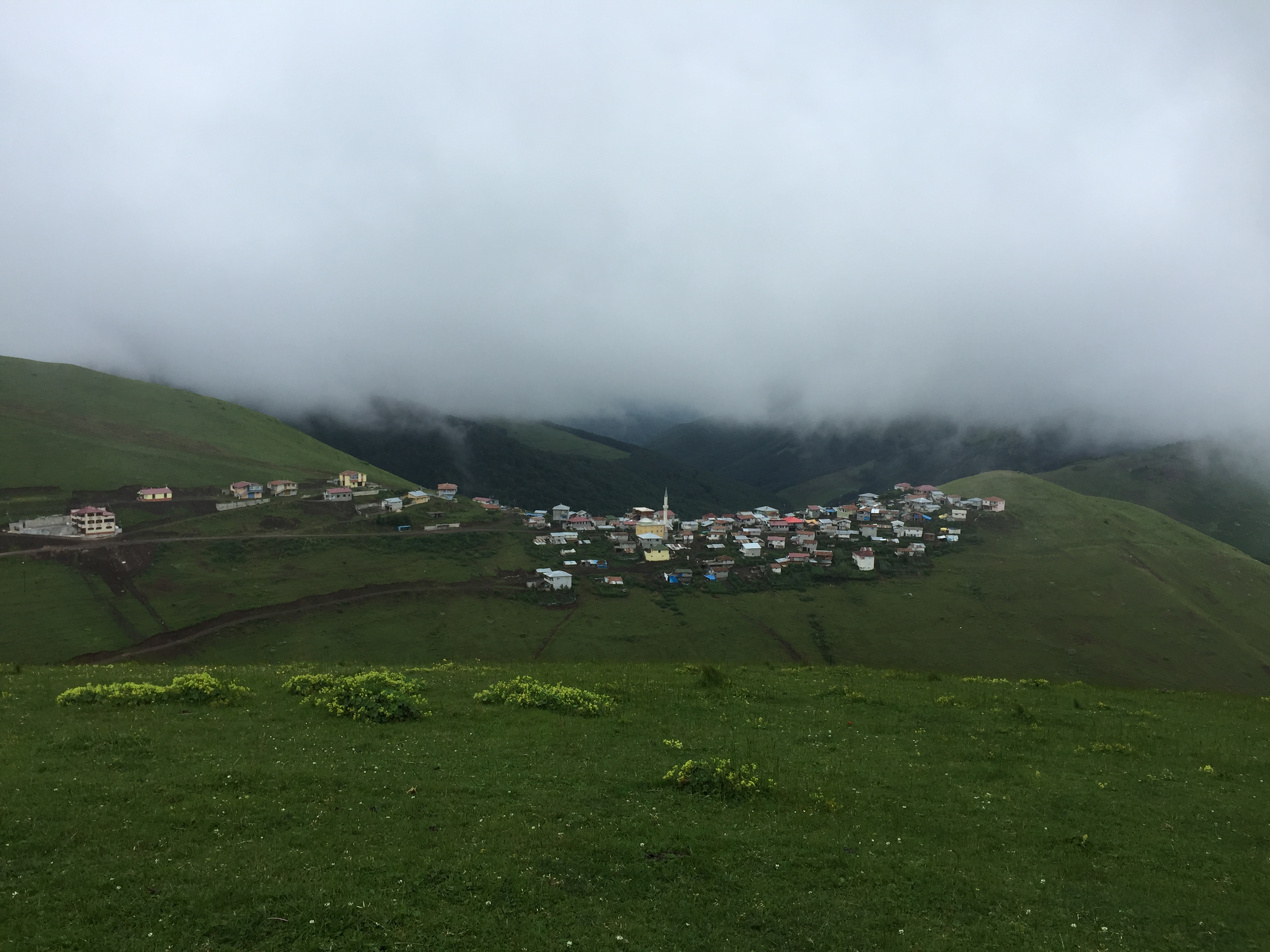
Baydarlı, Reşadiye, Tokat, Turkey

Baydarlı is a town (belde) in the Reşadiye District, Tokat Province, Turkey. Its population is 2,309 (2022).
