= Emirseyit =

- Municipality
- Location in Turkey
- Coordinates: 40°21′41″N 36°25′12″E
- Country: Turkey
- Province: Tokat
- District: Tokat
- Population (2022): 2,115
- Time zone: UTC+3 (TRT)

Emirseyit is a town (belde) in the Tokat District, Tokat Province, Turkey. Its population is 2,115 (2022).
