= Karayaka, Erbaa =

Karayaka
- Municipality
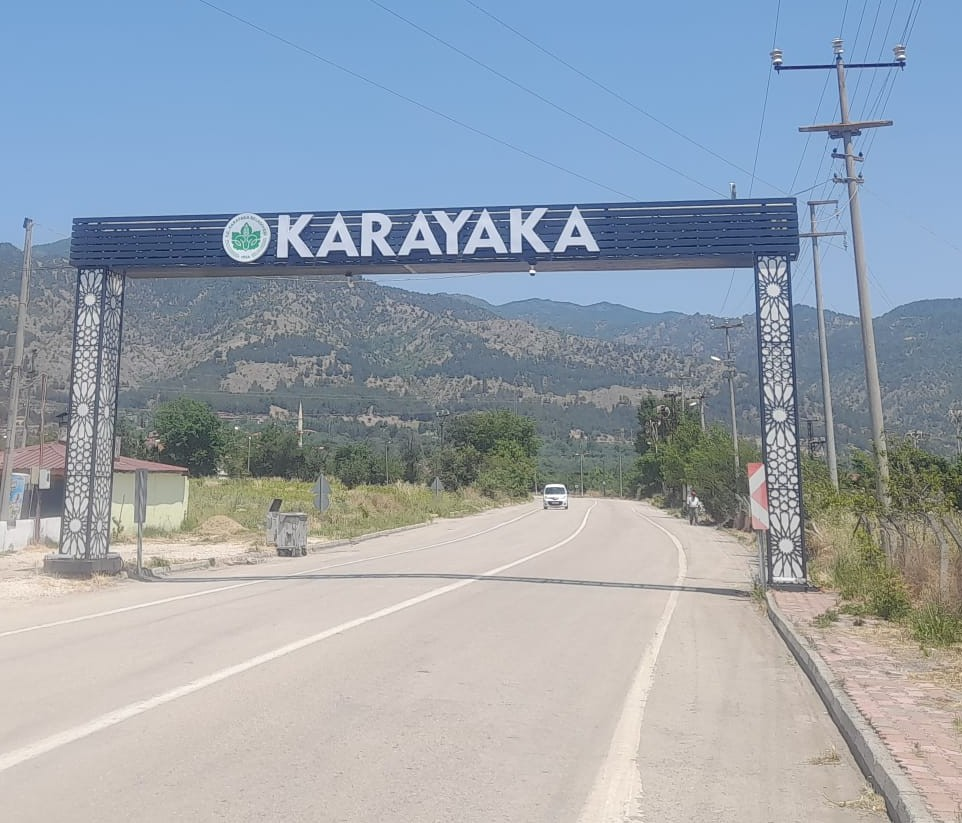

- Location within Turkey
- Coordinates: 40°44′33″N 36°35′40″E
- Country: Turkey
- Province: Tokat
- District: Erbaa
- Population (2022): 3,071
- Time zone: UTC+3 (TRT)

Karayaka is a town (belde) in the Erbaa District, Tokat Province, Turkey. Its population is 3,071 (2022).
