= Başçiftlik =

- Municipality
- Location in Turkey
- Coordinates: 40°33′N 37°10′E
- Country: Turkey
- Province: Tokat
- District: Başçiftlik

Government
  - Mayor: Murat Tunçel (AKP)
- Population (2022): 3,760
- Time zone: UTC+3 (TRT)
- Postal code: 60620
- Area code: 0356
- Website: www.basciftlik.bel.tr

Başçiftlik is a town in Tokat Province in the Black Sea region of Turkey. It is the seat of Başçiftlik District. Its population is 3,760 (2022). The mayor is Murat Tunçel (AKP).
