= Almus =

- Municipality
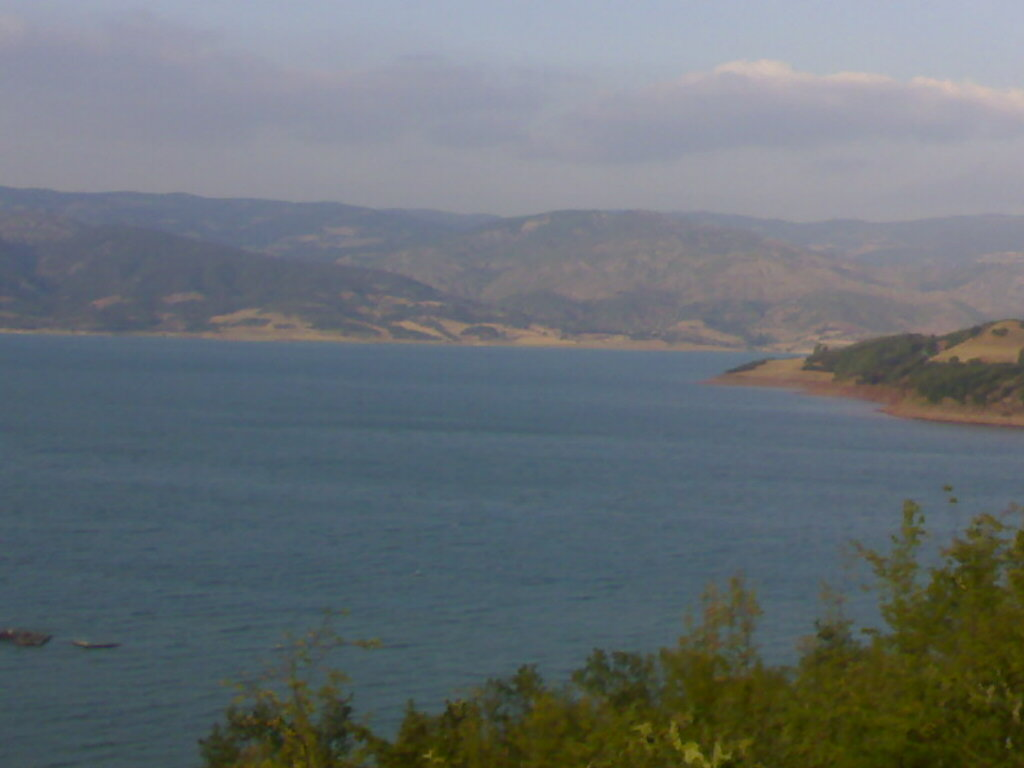
- Almus Dam Lake near Almus

- Location within Turkey
- Coordinates: 40°22′29″N 36°54′11″E
- Country: Turkey
- Province: Tokat
- District: Almus

Government
  - Mayor: Ayse Humeyra Turan (Laik Yönetim)
- Population (2022): 5,054
- Time zone: UTC+3 (TRT)
- Postal code: 60900
- Area code: 0356
- Climate: Csb
- Website: www.almus.bel.tr

Almus is a town in Tokat Province in the Black Sea region of Turkey. It is the seat of Almus District. Its population is 5,054 (2022). The mayor is Ayse Humeyra Turan (MHP).
