= Sulusaray =

- Municipality
- Location within Turkey
- Coordinates: 40°00′N 36°06′E
- Country: Turkey
- Province: Tokat
- District: Sulusaray

Government
  - Mayor: Necmettin Coruk (AKP)
- Population (2022): 4,383
- Time zone: UTC+3 (TRT)
- Area code: 0356
- Website: www.sulusaray60.bel.tr

Sulusaray or Çiftlik, in Antiquity and the early Middle Ages known as Sebastopolis (Greek: Σεβαστούπολις) or Heracleopolis (Ἡρακλειούπολις), is a town in Tokat Province in the Black Sea region of Turkey. It is the seat of Sulusaray District. Its population is 4,383 (2022). Sulusaray is about 68 km from the center of Tokat, and about 30 km from Artova town. The site is situated on a plain surrounded by mountains and the Çekerek river runs near it. The mayor is Necmettin Coruk (AKP).

== Name ==
The word Sebastopolis comes from Greek Sebastos, the Greek equivalent of the Latin Augustus, while polis means "city". In some sources the city was named as Heracleopolis (meaning "the city of Heracles", a Greek deity symbolizing power and strength).

== History ==
The date of foundation of this ancient city is still unknown, findings from the site indicate that Sebastopolis has been continuously inhabited from 3,000 BC to the present day. Some sources say that it was first established in the first century during the reign of Roman emperor Trajan, and that the city was separated from the districts of Pontus Galaticus/Polemoniacus and was included in the province of Cappadocia as recorded on an epitaph on a monument for Arrian, the Governor of the region of Cappadocia.

Sebastopolis was at the crossroads of east to west, and south/ central to north routes which made it a wealthy centre of trade during the Roman and Byzantine periods.

It was considered to be one of the five largest cities in the Black Sea region. It had the authority to mint its own coins but gradually lost its importance after wars and natural disasters. Trade routes were later diverted and further reduced its importance.

In Ptolemy's time, it was a town in Pontus Cappadocicus (Ptol. v. 6. § 7), which, according to the Antonine Itinerary (p. 205), was situated on a route leading from Tavium to Sebastia (modern Sivas), and was connected by a road with Caesarea (p. 214). Pliny (vi. 3) places it in the district of Colopene, and agrees with other authorities in describing it as a small town. (Hierocl. p. 703)

Architectural pieces recovered during the digs organized by the Directorate of the Tokat Museum in 1987 showed that the city was an important settlement during the Hellenistic, Roman and Byzantine periods. The artefacts recovered at the Comana Pontica (Old Tokat) are very similar to those recovered from the city of Sebastopolis, probably these two ancient cities had a close relationship in the past.

The ancient city was surrounded by a city wall made of small, neatly cut stones put together without using mortar. A circular shape temple was discovered at the northeast side of the city, it was made of marble floor. The baths are situated at the eastern part of the Sebastopolis, where the water needed was recovered from the thermal spring located about 3 kilometers to the southwest. Many statues and statuettes, friezes, columns, grave steles and epitaphs have been found during excavations.
