= Turhal =

- Municipality
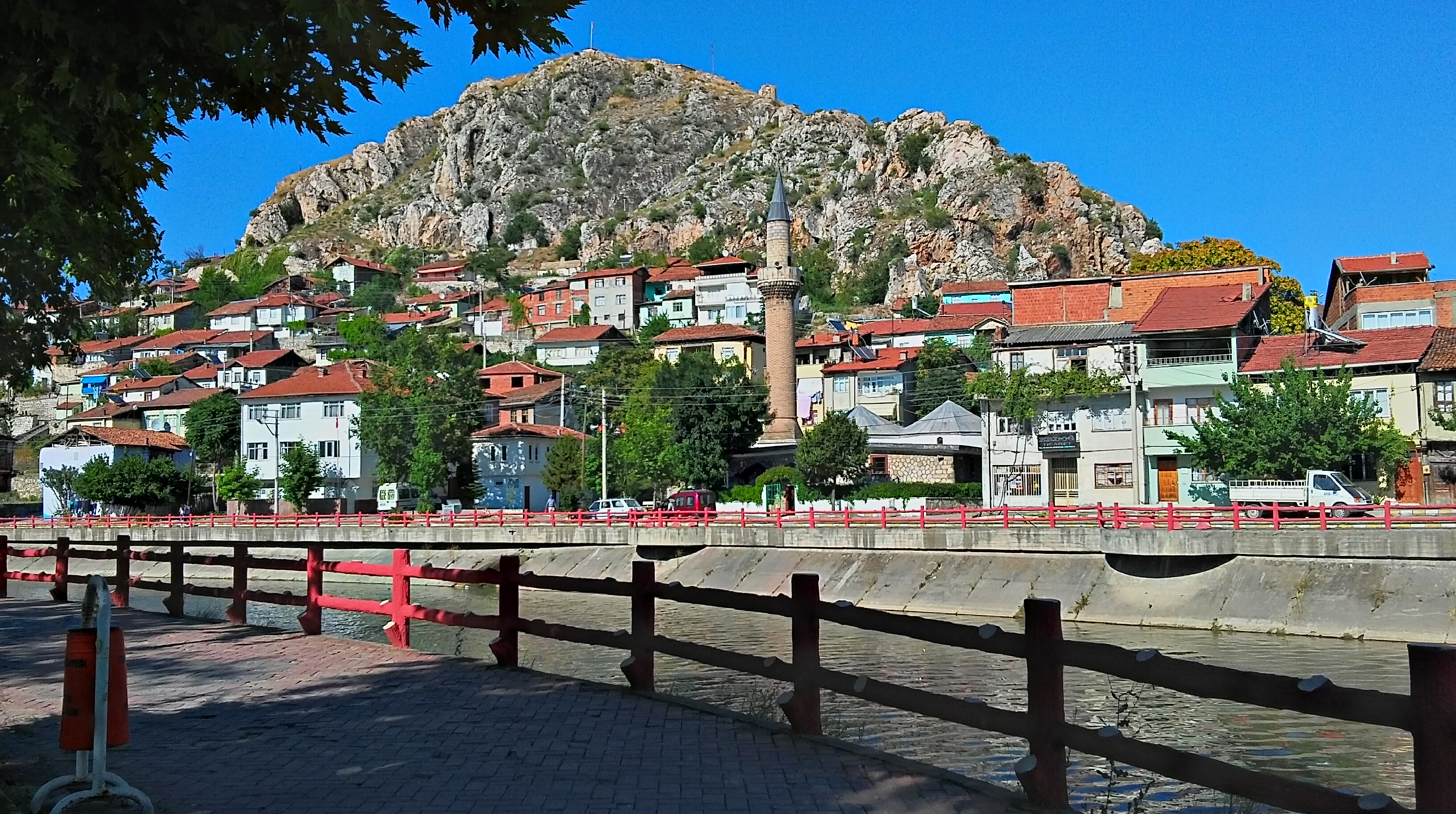

- Coat of arms

- Location within Turkey
- Coordinates: 40°23′24″N 36°05′24″E
- Country: Turkey
- Province: Tokat
- District: Turhal

Government
  - Mayor: Mehmet Erdem Ural (CHP)
- Elevation: 493 m (1,617 ft)
- Population (2022): 62,030
- Time zone: UTC+3 (TRT)
- Postal code: 60300
- Area code: 0356
- Website: www.turhal.bel.tr

Turhal is a district in Tokat Province in the Black Sea region of Turkey. It is the seat of Turhal District. Its population is 62,030 (2022). It is 48 km to the west of Tokat. Turhal is situated on a fertile plain fragmented by the Yeşil Irmak river. It has an elevation of approximately 530 m. The city is best known for its sugar beet processing plant established in 1934 as an important enterprise of the young Turkish Republic.

== History ==
The first nucleus of Turhal appeared as an important fortress or fortification named Talaura (Τάλαυρα in Ancient greek) on the way between today's Amasya and Tokat provinces. It is deduced from the tablets found in the region that Turhal had been inhabited as early as the third millennium BC and had relations as far as the Mesopotamian cultures such as Sumerians who had already invented an effective alphabet.

=== Classical Age ===
==== Persian period ====
The Persian invasion in Anatolia during the 6th century BC made this region an important center influenced by the cult of Zoroastrianism. The famous geographer of the antiquity, Strabo has, on various occasions, drawn up different accounts on the region describing Turhal as a fortress in the north of another ancient city named Gayyura.

==== Hellenistic period ====
In the 3rd century BC, the region was occupied by the contingents of Alexander the Great's Macedonian army, but many insurrections had also taken place in this era as the Macedonian occupiers couldn't build up a total control on the region.

After the collapse of Alexander's Empire (as Alexander died in 323 BC), the region was taken over by the Pontus Kingdom founded on the Black Sea coast who later had to retreat in the face of emerging Roman power in the whole Anatolia. The Pontus Kings from the Mithridates descendance constructed an even more powerful fortress on a rocky hill in the center of the outer city whose remains are only two ruined towers and several tunnels today. The struggle between the two powers lasted for decades and ended up in an absolute defeat suffered by the Pontus Kingdom. Having captured the fortress, the Roman General Pompeius destroyed it. In 395, The Roman Empire was divided into two independent states and thus, Turhal became a Byzantine domain together with other eastern Roman provinces. Turhal was the site of the bishopric of Ibora which persists as a titular see of the Roman Catholic Church to this day. Evagrius Ponticus was born there in the mid fourth century.

During the Byzantine era, the region had undergone several raids from the Sassanids in the 4th and 5th centuries, later from the Muslim Arabs in the 8th century.

As the constant Turkish immigration to Anatolia and the emerging Seljuk power in the neighbouring east weakened the Byzantine rule in the region, the Turkish principality of Danishmend captured Turhal and its environs after 1071 but later ceded it to the Kingdom of Seljuk Turks (Selçuklular). In the 13th century, the whole region was invaded by the Ilkhan Emperors who extended their rule as a devastating wave from the Middle Asia to Anatolia. In 1399, Turhal was taken over by the Ottomans who were uniting the Turkish principalities in Anatolia under their command. After a short invasion by Temur, Turhal was taken over once more by the Ottomans in 1413.

The most significant change in the demographic structure of Turhal occurred during the second half of the 19th century as the town became a place of settlement for the Muslim refugees and immigrants coming from the Balkans and Caucasus due to constant military conflicts that the collapsing Ottomans got involved around those regions such as the Crimean War (1854–1878) and the Russo-Turkish War, 1877–1878.There is also a Kurdish population and their tribes Badıllı, Canbeg,Şexbızın, Reshwan, Metinan.

== Today's Turhal ==
As mentioned above, Turhal is best known for its sugar beet processing plant established in 1934. But today Turhal's economy depends on much diverted business sectors such as textile, animal feed and dairy products. Turhal also has a machine works which provides an important income to the town. Today, Turhal is becoming important with its natural marble deposits and marble processing industries. Traditionally, stockbreeding and other agricultural activities still keep their importance too.

== Gallery ==
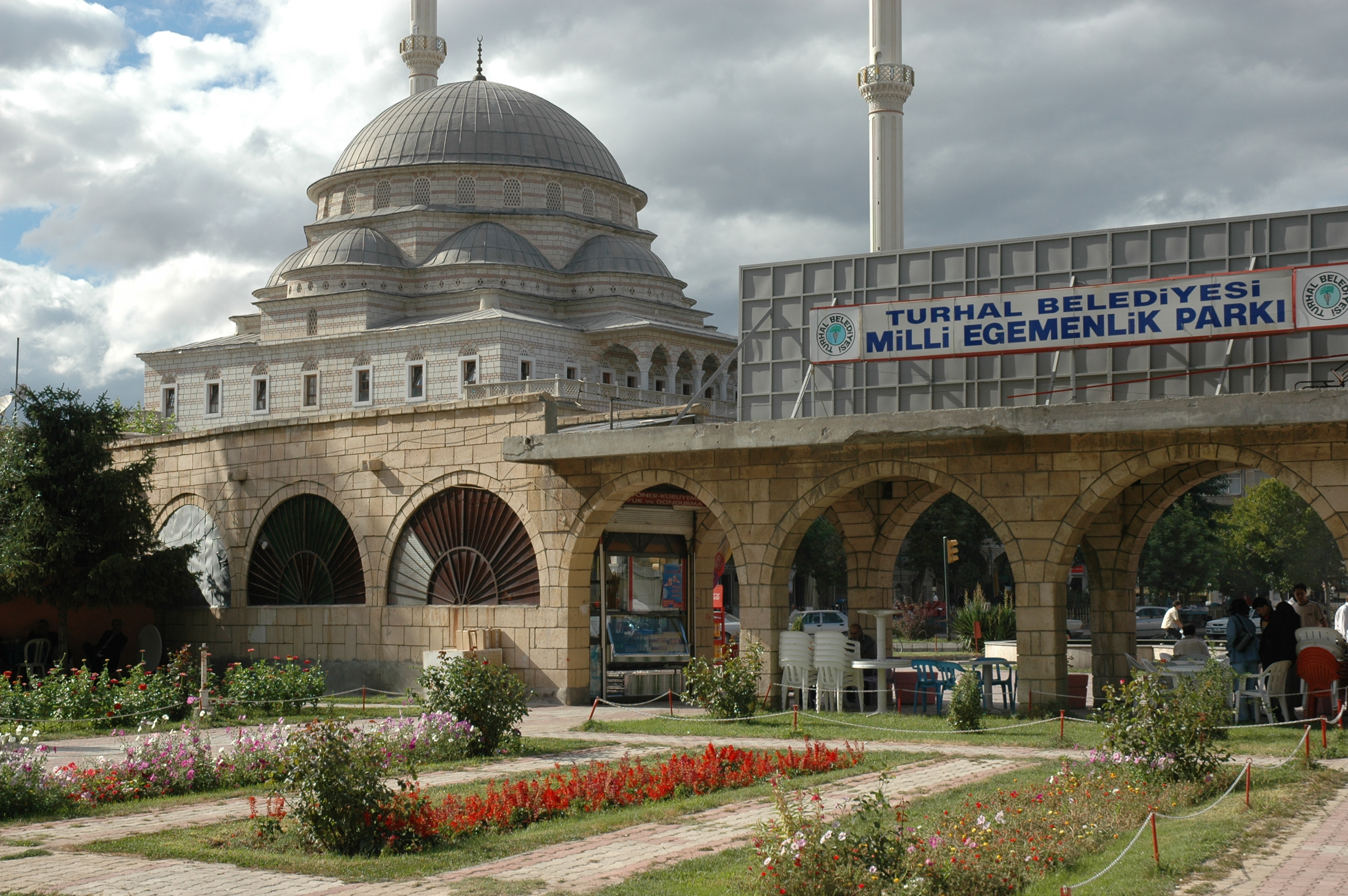
Turhal Central Mosque

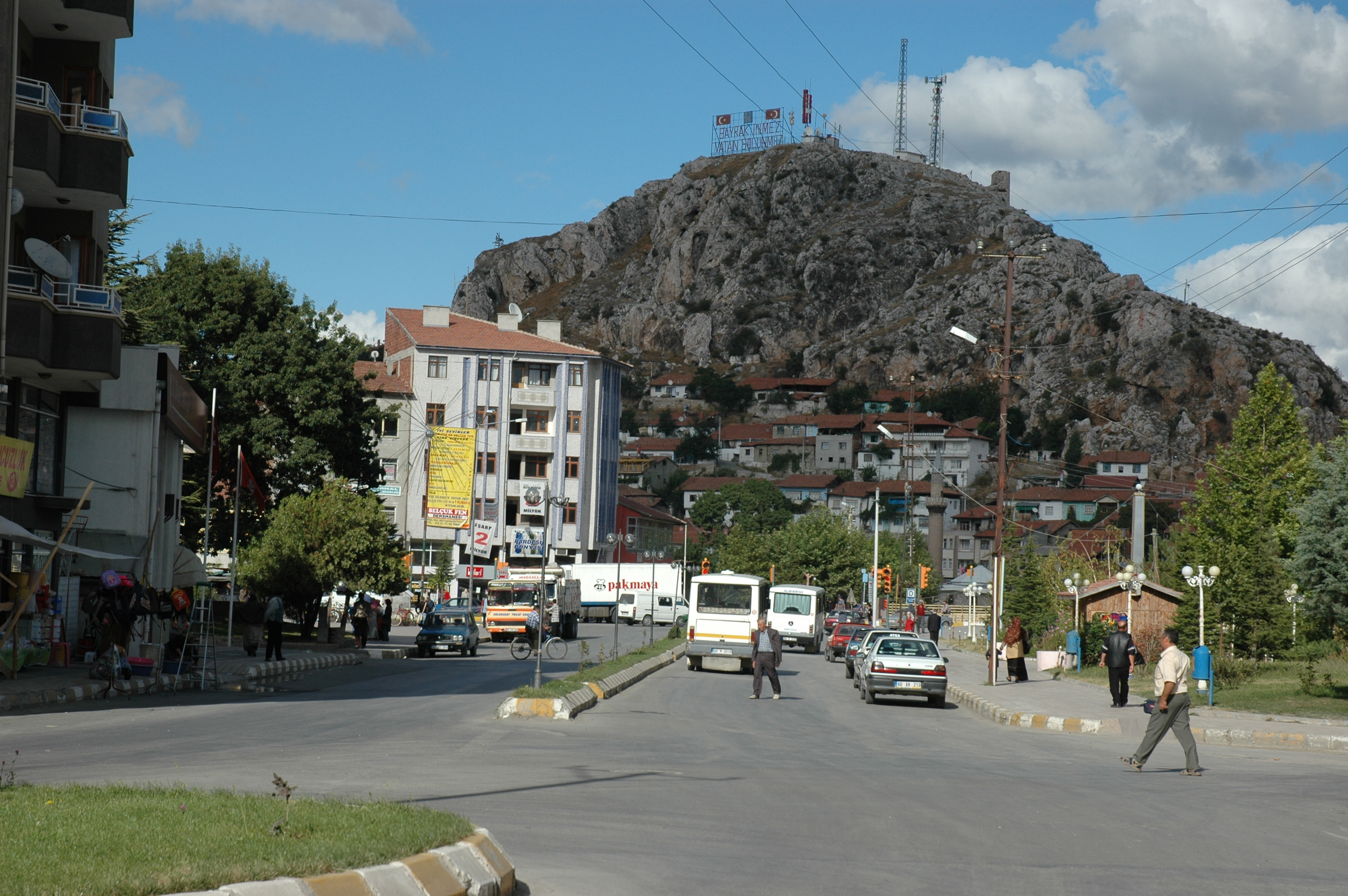
Turhal view of Kale Hill

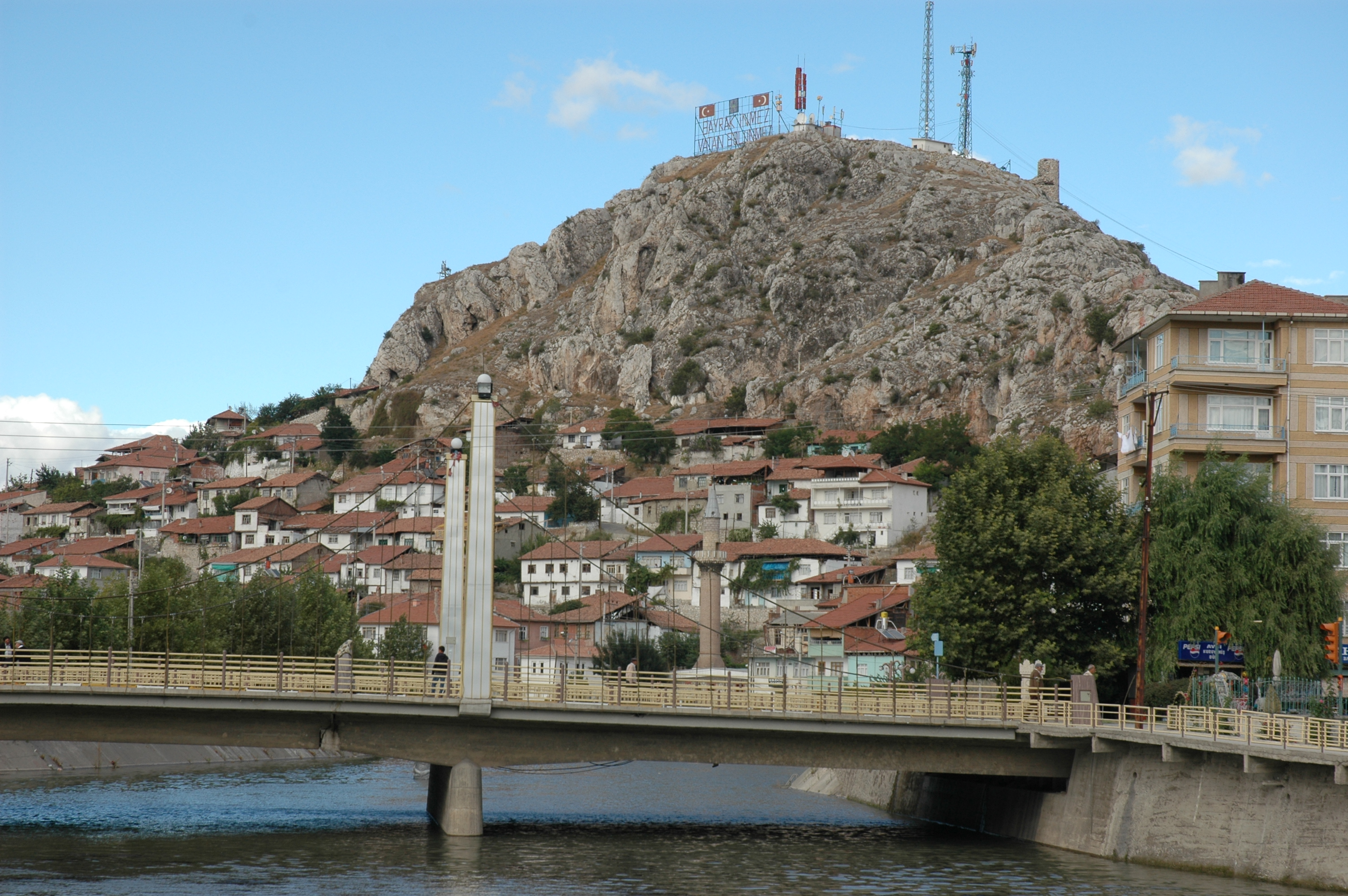
Turhal view of Kale Hill

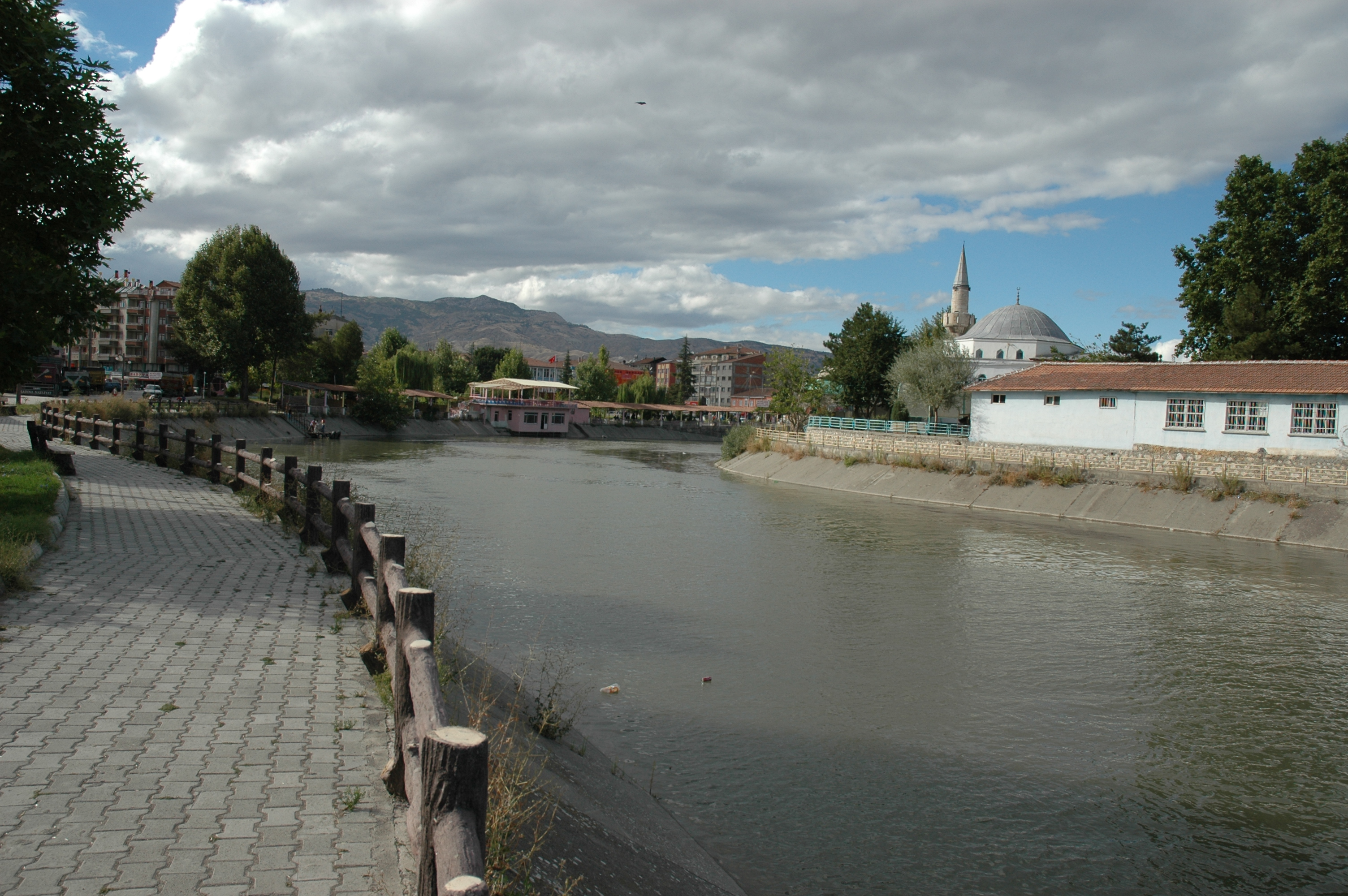
Turhal Yeşilırmak view

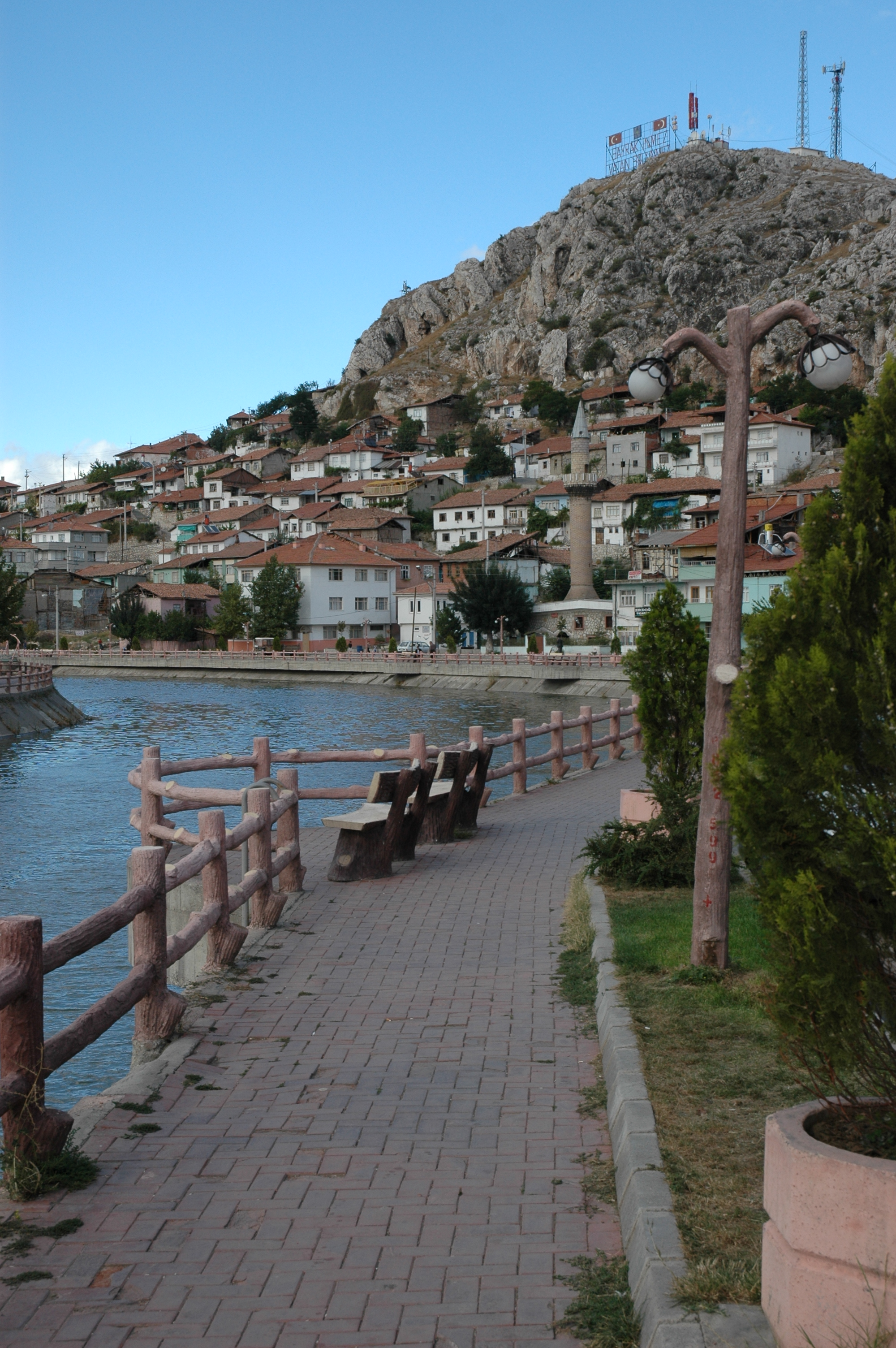
Turhal Yeşilırmak view

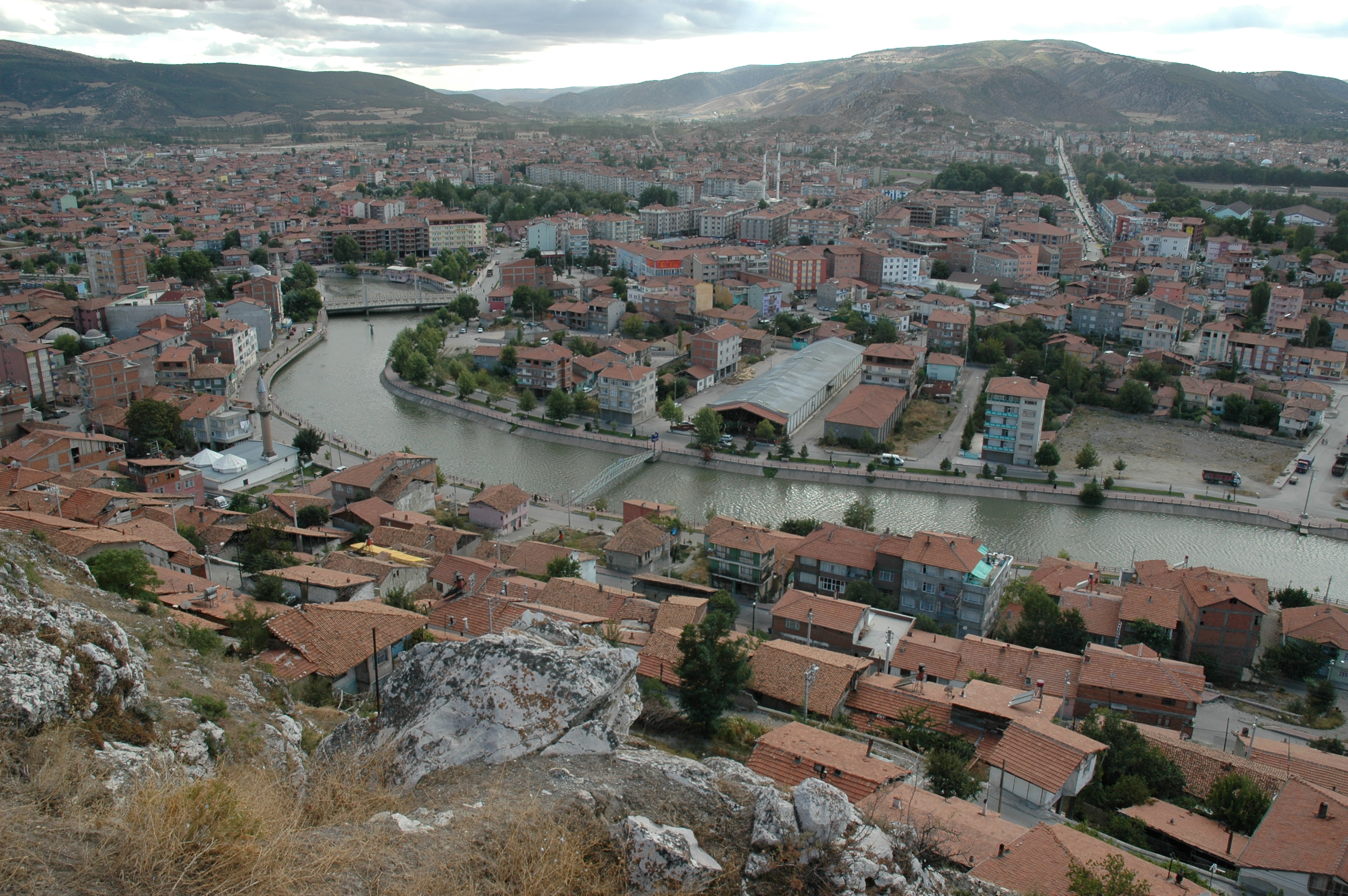
Turhal from Kale Hill

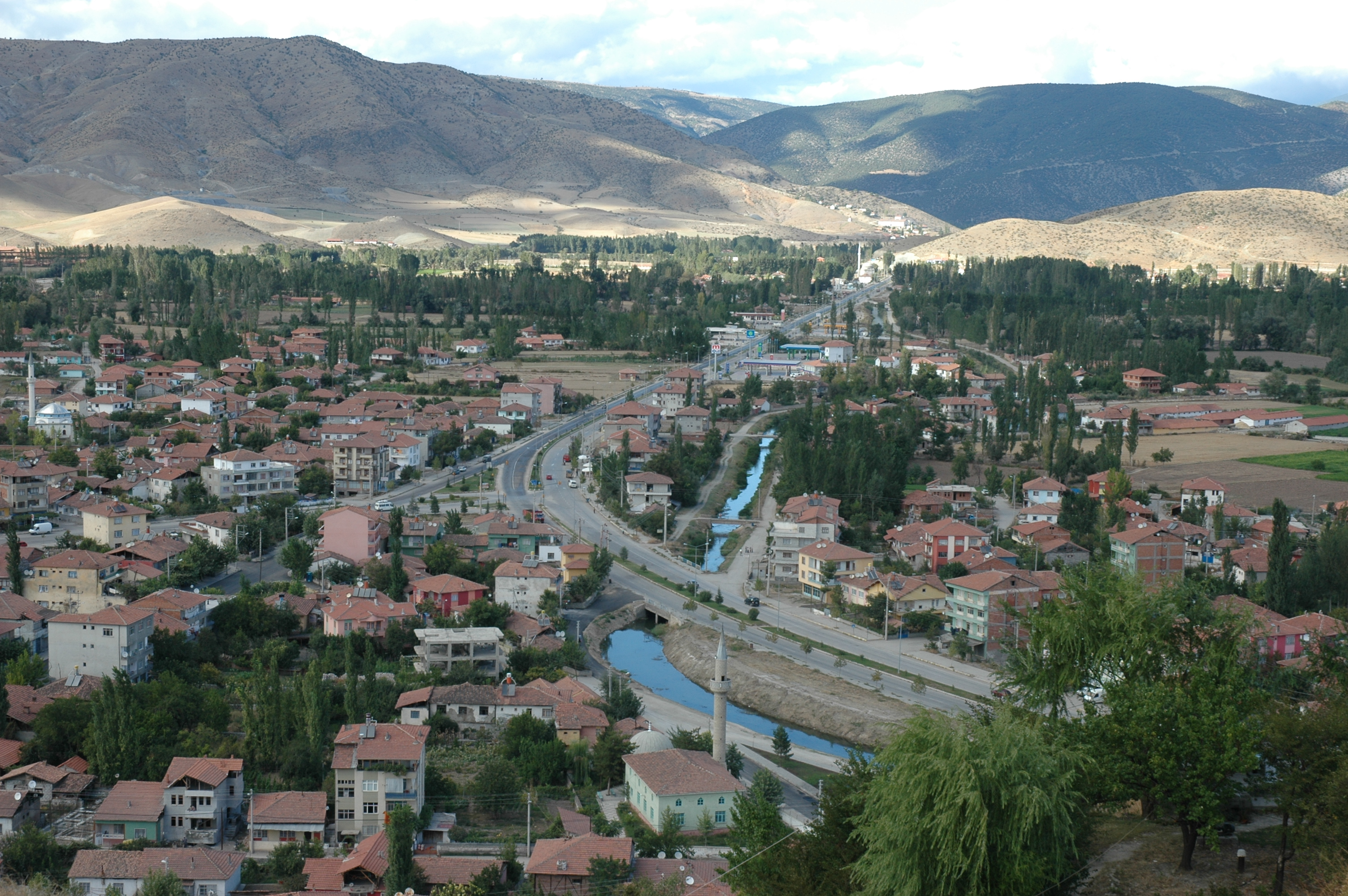
Turhal from Kale Hill

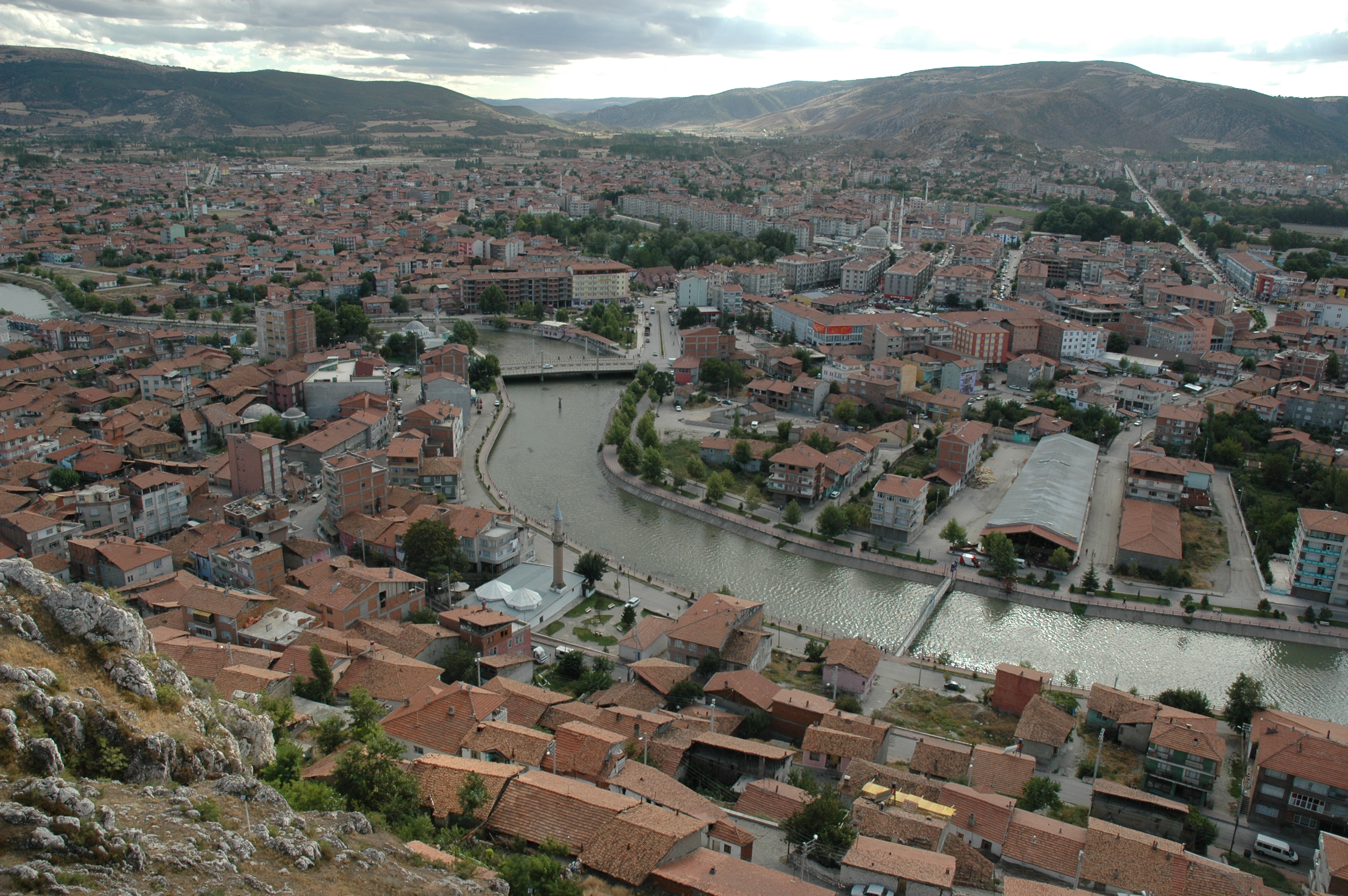
Turhal from Kale Hill

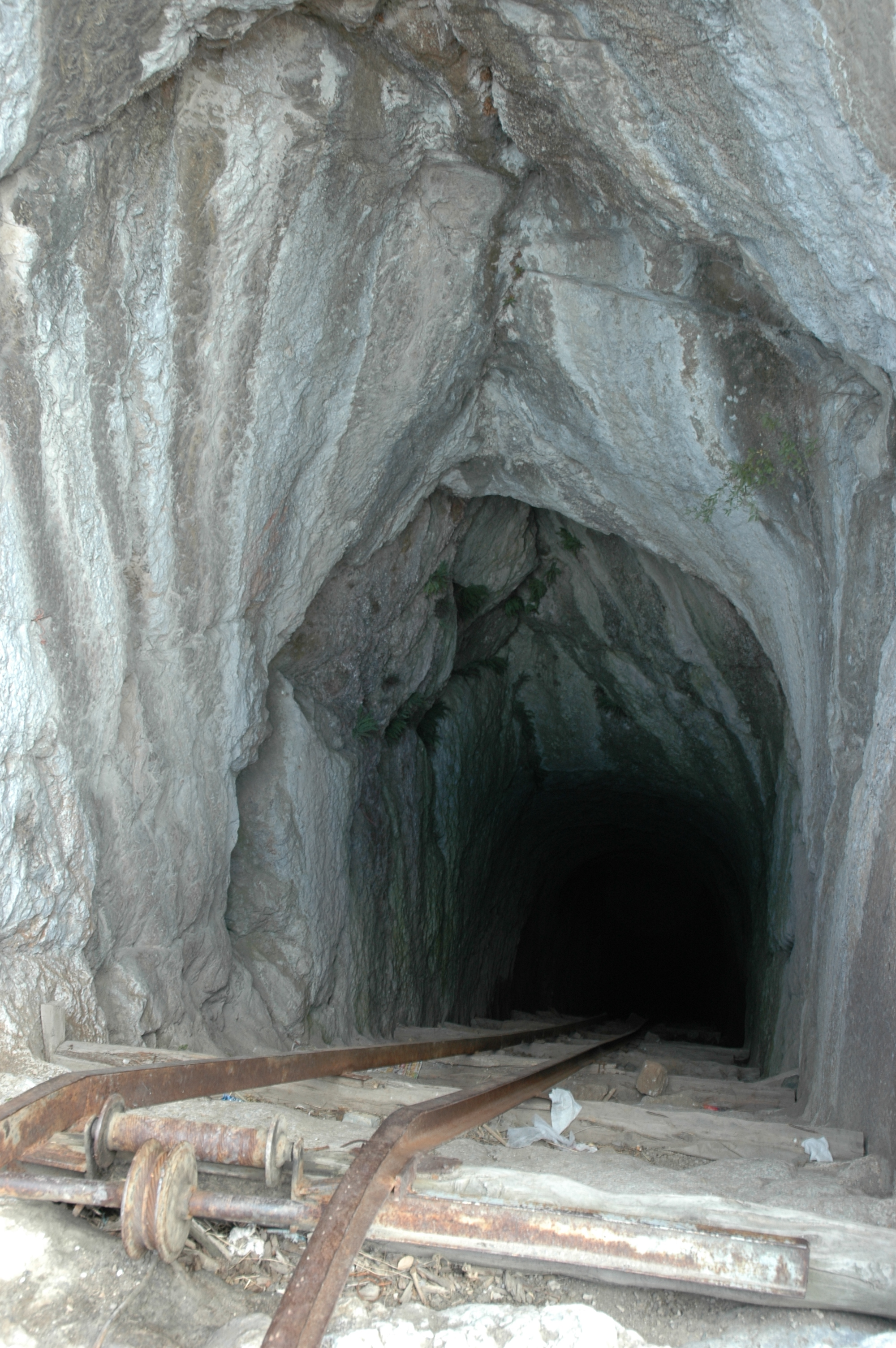
Turhal mine entrance

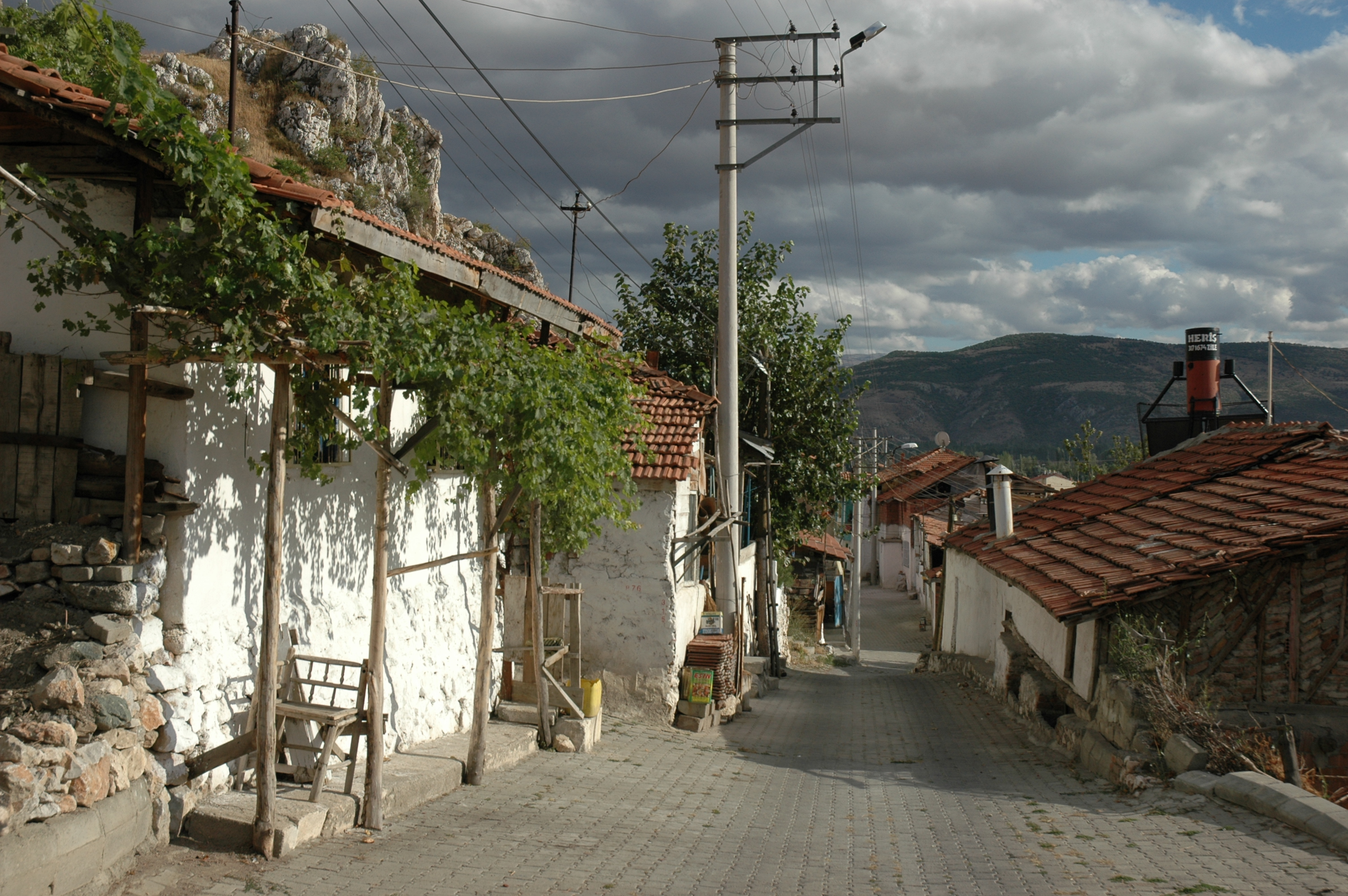
Turhal old houses

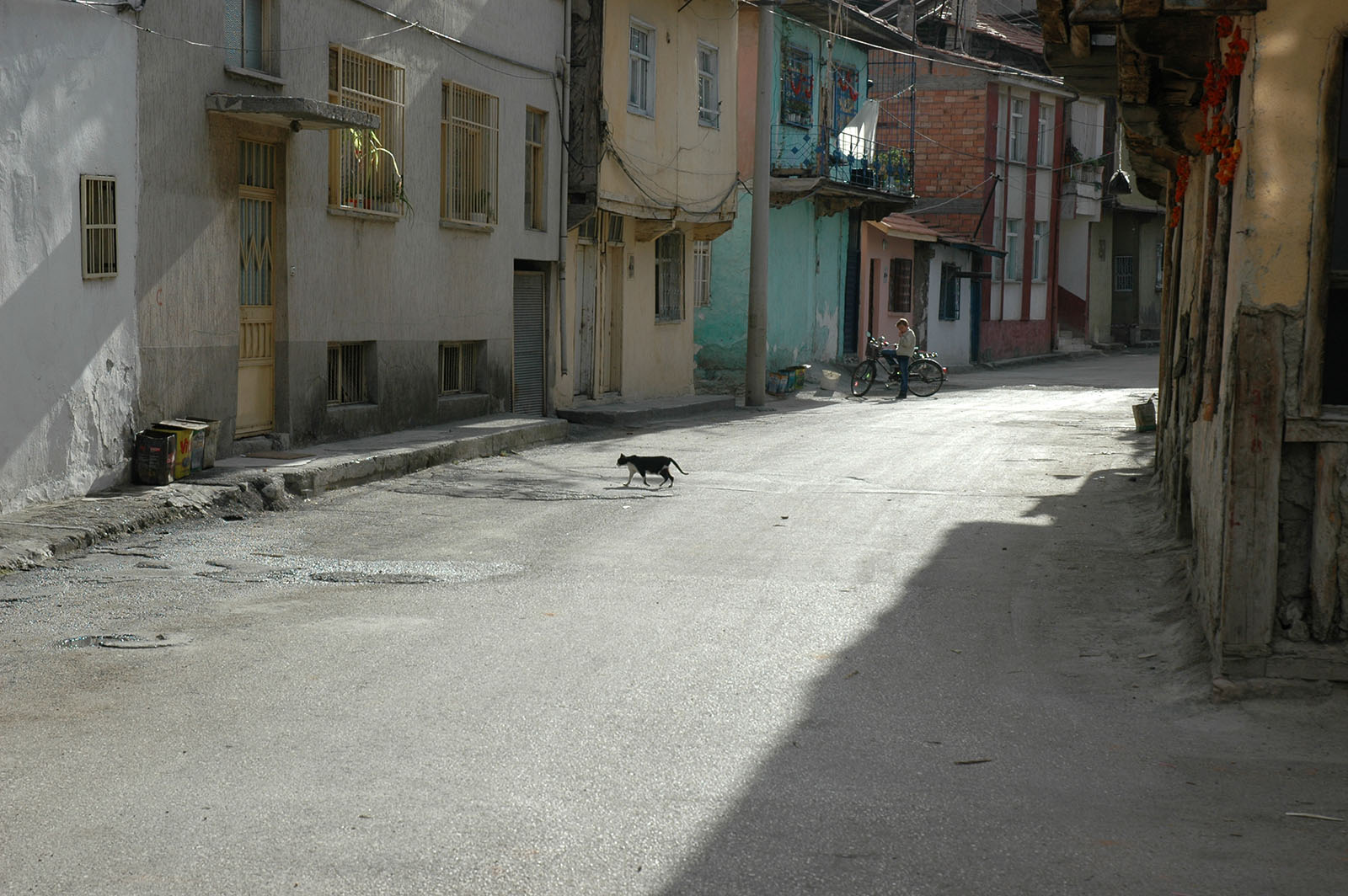
Turhal old houses

== See also ==
- Ibora
