= Şenyurt, Tokat =

Şenyurt
- Municipality
- Location in Turkey
- Coordinates: 40°20′N 36°12′E
- Country: Turkey
- Province: Tokat
- District: Turhal
- Elevation: 600 m (2,000 ft)
- Population (2022): 1,973
- Time zone: UTC+3 (TRT)
- Postal code: 60320
- Area code: 0356

Şenyurt is a town (belde) in Turhal District of Tokat Province, Turkey. Its population is 1,973 (2022). It is situated to the north of Turkish state highway D.180 which connects Tokat to Amasya. The distance to Turhal is 12 kilometres (7.5 mi) and to Tokat is 32 kilometres (20 mi). The settlement was founded in 1972 as a result of merging four neighbouring villages. The population of those villages was composed of Caucasus migrants from the 1850s. The main economic activity is fruit farming.
