= Yeşilyurt, Tokat =

Yeşilyurt
- Municipality
- Location in Turkey
- Coordinates: 40°00′N 36°13′E
- Country: Turkey
- Province: Tokat
- District: Yeşilyurt

Government
  - Mayor: Muhsin Yılmaz (MHP)
- Population (2022): 5,263
- Time zone: UTC+3 (TRT)
- Postal code: 60860
- Area code: 0356
- Website: www.tokatyesilyurt.bel.tr

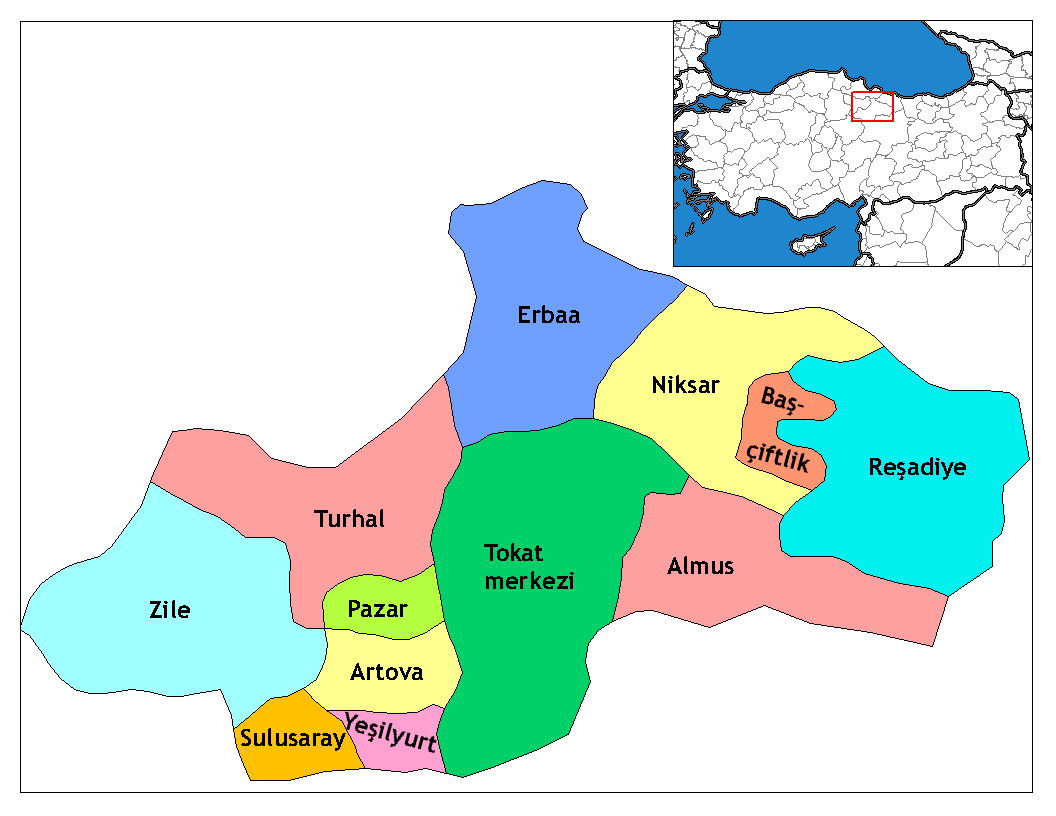
Map of the districts of Tokat province in Turkey

Yeşilyurt is a town in Tokat Province in the Black Sea region of Turkey. It is the seat of Yeşilyurt District. Its population is 5,263 (2022). The mayor is Muhsin Yılmaz (MHP).
