= Yeşilyurt District, Tokat =

District of Tokat Province, Turkey

Yeşilyurt District
- District
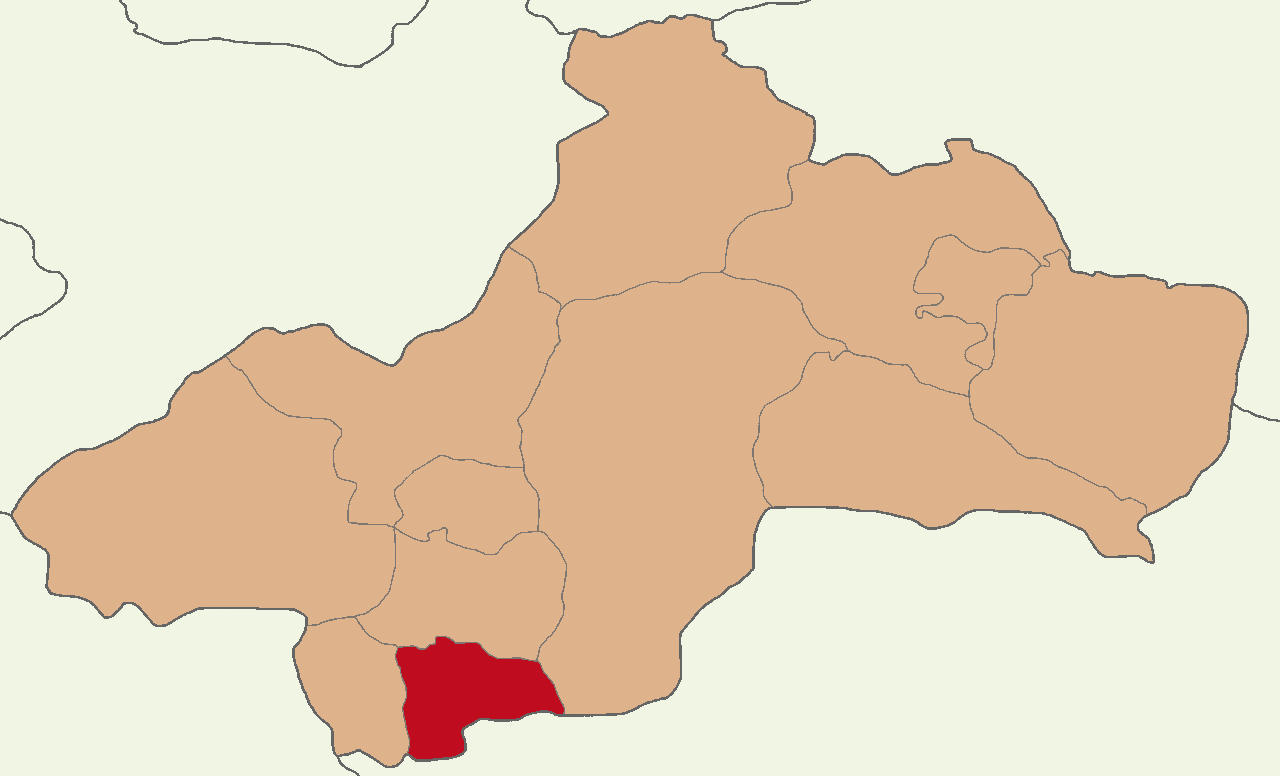
- Map showing Yeşilyurt District in Tokat Province

- Location in Turkey
- Coordinates: 40°00′N 36°13′E
- Country: Turkey
- Province: Tokat
- Seat: Yeşilyurt

Government
  - Kaymakam: Murathan Cebeci
- Area: 280 km^{2} (110 sq mi)
- Population (2022): 8,336
  - Density: 30/km^{2} (77/sq mi)
- Time zone: UTC+3 (TRT)
- Website: www.yesilyurt.gov.tr

Yeşilyurt District is a district of the Tokat Province of Turkey. Its seat is the town of Yeşilyurt. Its area is 280 km^{2}, and its population is 8,336 (2022).

== Composition ==
There is one municipality in Yeşilyurt District:

- Yeşilyurt

There are 15 villages in Yeşilyurt District:

- Bahçebaşı
- Büğet
- Çerkez Danişment
- Damlalı
- Doğlacık
- Ekinli
- Gündoğan
- Karacaören
- Karagözgöllüalan
- Karaoluk
- Kavunluk
- Sekücek
- Sivri
- Yağmur
- Yeniköy
