= Sulusaray District =

District of Tokat Province, Turkey

- District
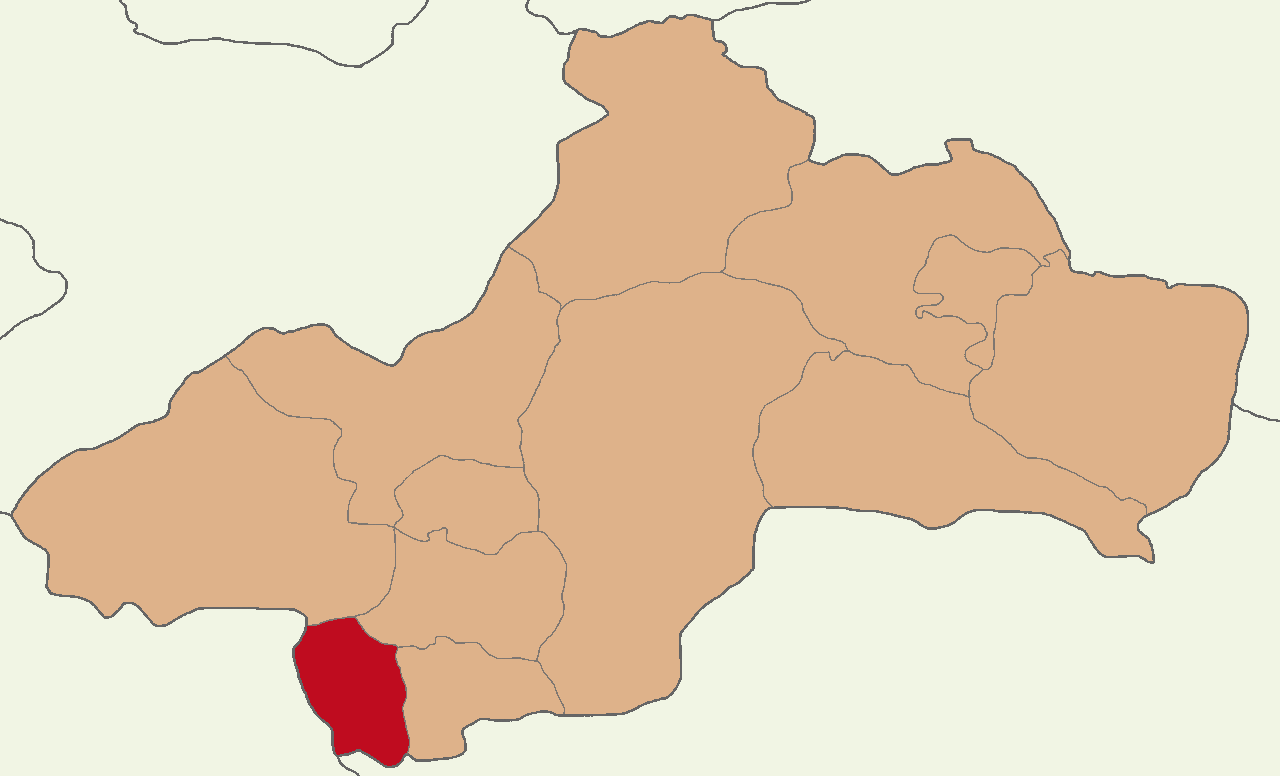
- Map showing Sulusaray District in Tokat Province

- Location in Turkey
- Coordinates: 40°00′N 36°06′E
- Country: Turkey
- Province: Tokat
- Seat: Sulusaray

Government
  - Kaymakam: Oğuzhan Öztürk
- Area: 266 km^{2} (103 sq mi)
- Population (2022): 6,533
  - Density: 25/km^{2} (64/sq mi)
- Time zone: UTC+3 (TRT)
- Website: www.sulusaray.gov.tr

Sulusaray District is a district of the Tokat Province of Turkey. Its seat is the town of Sulusaray. Its area is 266 km^{2}, and its population is 6,533 (2022).

== Composition ==
There is one municipality in Sulusaray District:

- Sulusaray

There are 14 villages in Sulusaray District:

- Alanyurt
- Alpudere
- Arpacıkaraçay
- Balıkhisar
- Ballıkaya
- Bayazıt
- Belpınar
- Buğdaylı
- Çime
- Ilıcak
- Sarıyaprak
- Selimiye
- Tekkeyeni
- Uylubağı
