= Artova =

- Municipality
- Location in Turkey
- Coordinates: 40°07′00″N 36°18′06″E
- Country: Turkey
- Province: Tokat
- District: Artova

Government
  - Mayor: Lütvü Yalçın (AKP)
- Elevation: 1,190 m (3,900 ft)
- Population (2022): 3,731
- Time zone: UTC+3 (TRT)
- Postal code: 60670
- Area code: 0356
- Website: www.artova.bel.tr

Artova is a town in Tokat Province in the Black Sea region of Turkey. It is the seat of Başçiftlik District. Its population is 3,731 (2022). It is located 31 km (19 mi) southwest of Tokat. A railway line through Artova connects the town in the north with Samsun and in the southwest with Sivas. The town's current mayor is Lütvü Yalçın (AKP).
