= Governor of Tokat =

Governor of Tokat Tokat Valiliği
- Logo of the Governor of Tokat
- Incumbent; Abdullah Köklü since July 24, 2024
- Appointer: President of Turkey; On the recommendation of the Turkish government
- Term length: No set term length or limit
- Inaugural holder: Sait Bey; 1923
- Website: Office of the Governor

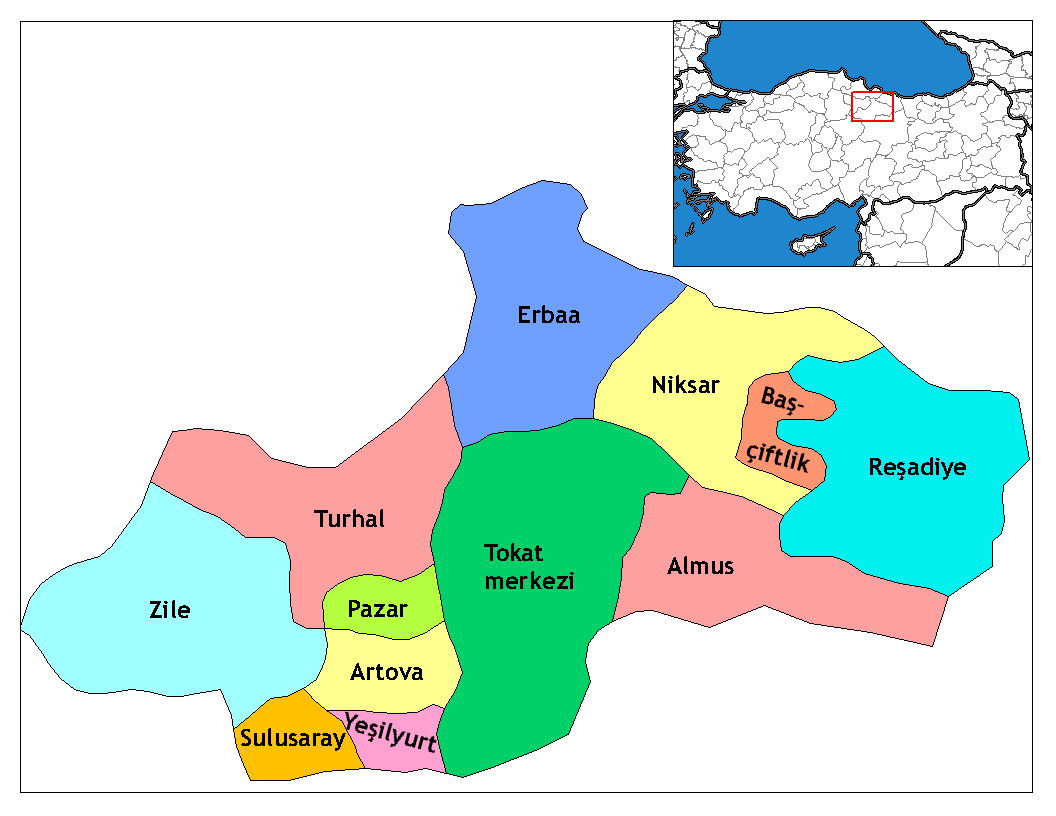
Map of the Province of Tokat, showing the provincial districts.

The Governor of Tokat (Turkish: Tokat Valiliği) is the bureaucratic state official responsible for both national government and state affairs in the Province of Tokat. Similar to the Governors of the 80 other Provinces of Turkey, the Governor of Tokat is appointed by the Government of Turkey and is responsible for the implementation of government legislation within Tokat. The Governor is also the most senior commander of both the Tokat provincial police force and the Tokat Gendarmerie.

== Appointment ==
The Governor of Tokat is appointed by the President of Turkey, who confirms the appointment after recommendation from the Turkish Government. The Ministry of the Interior first considers and puts forward possible candidates for approval by the cabinet. The Governor of Tokat is therefore not a directly elected position and instead functions as the most senior civil servant in the Province of Tokat.

=== Term limits ===
The Governor is not limited by any term limits and does not serve for a set length of time. Instead, the Governor serves at the pleasure of the Government, which can appoint or reposition the Governor whenever it sees fit. Such decisions are again made by the cabinet of Turkey. The Governor of Tokat, as a civil servant, may not have any close connections or prior experience in Tokat Province. It is not unusual for Governors to alternate between several different Provinces during their bureaucratic career.

== Functions ==
The Governor of Tokat has both bureaucratic functions and influence over local government. The main role of the Governor is to oversee the implementation of decisions by government ministries, constitutional requirements and legislation passed by Grand National Assembly within the provincial borders. The Governor also has the power to reassign, remove or appoint officials a certain number of public offices and has the right to alter the role of certain public institutions if they see fit. Governors are also the most senior public official within the Province, meaning that they preside over any public ceremonies or provincial celebrations being held due to a national holiday. As the commander of the provincial police and Gendarmerie forces, the Governor can also take decisions designed to limit civil disobedience and preserve public order. Although mayors of municipalities and councillors are elected during local elections, the Governor has the right to re-organise or to inspect the proceedings of local government despite being an unelected position.

== List of governors of Tokat ==
- Sait Bey (1923–1924)
- Mehmet Rahmi Gökçe (1924–1925)
- Mehmet Kadri Üçok (1925–1930)
- Ali Rıza Ceylan (1930–1933)
- Recai Güreli (1933–1936)
- Hasan Faiz Ergun (1936–1939)
- Selahattin Üner (1939–1940)
- Ahmet İzzettin Çağpar (1940–1945)
- Cavit Kınay (1945–1946)
- Eşref Erkut (1946–1948)
- Fevzi Karakülah (1948–1950)
- Ahmet Demir (1950–1951)
- Kamil Tuncel (1951–1953)
- Sait Kemalî Atay (1953–1954)
- Hadi Ömür (1954–1955)
- Eşref Ayhan (1955–1958)
- Niyazi Akı (1958–1960)
- Sadık Erdem (1960)
- Yakup Yücel (1960–1961)
- Sadi Kâzım Süer (1961–1962)
- Cezmi Kartay (1962–1964)
- Ahmet Sadullah Verel (1964–1966)
- Mehmet Aldan (1966–1968)
- Ali Rıza Yaradanakul (1968–1970)
- Fahri Centel (1970–1972)
- Mustafa Kemal Demirtaş (1972–1975)
- Sabahattin Çakmakoğlu (1975–1978)
- Yılmaz Ergun (1978–1979)
- Kenan Güven (1979–1981)
- Hasan Bamyacı (1981–1984)
- Recep Yazıcıoğlu (1984–1989)
- M. İlyas Aksoy (1989–1991)
- Adnan Darendeliler (1991–1992)
- Sami Sönmez (1992–1996)
- Mehmet Gündoğdu (1996–2000)
- Ayhan Nasuhbeyoğlu (2000–2003)
- Lütfullah Bilgin (2003–2005)
- Erdoğan Bektaş (2005–2008)
- Şerif Yılmaz (2009–2012)
- Mustafa Taşkesen (2012–2014)
- Cevdet Can (2014–2017)
- Dr. Ömer Toraman (2017–2018)
- Dr. Ozan Balcı (2018–2022)
- Numan Hatipoğlu (2022–2024)
- Abdullah Köklü (2024–)

== See also ==
- Governor (Turkey)
- Tokat Province
- Ministry of the Interior (Turkey)
