= Turhal District =

District of Tokat Province, Turkey

- District
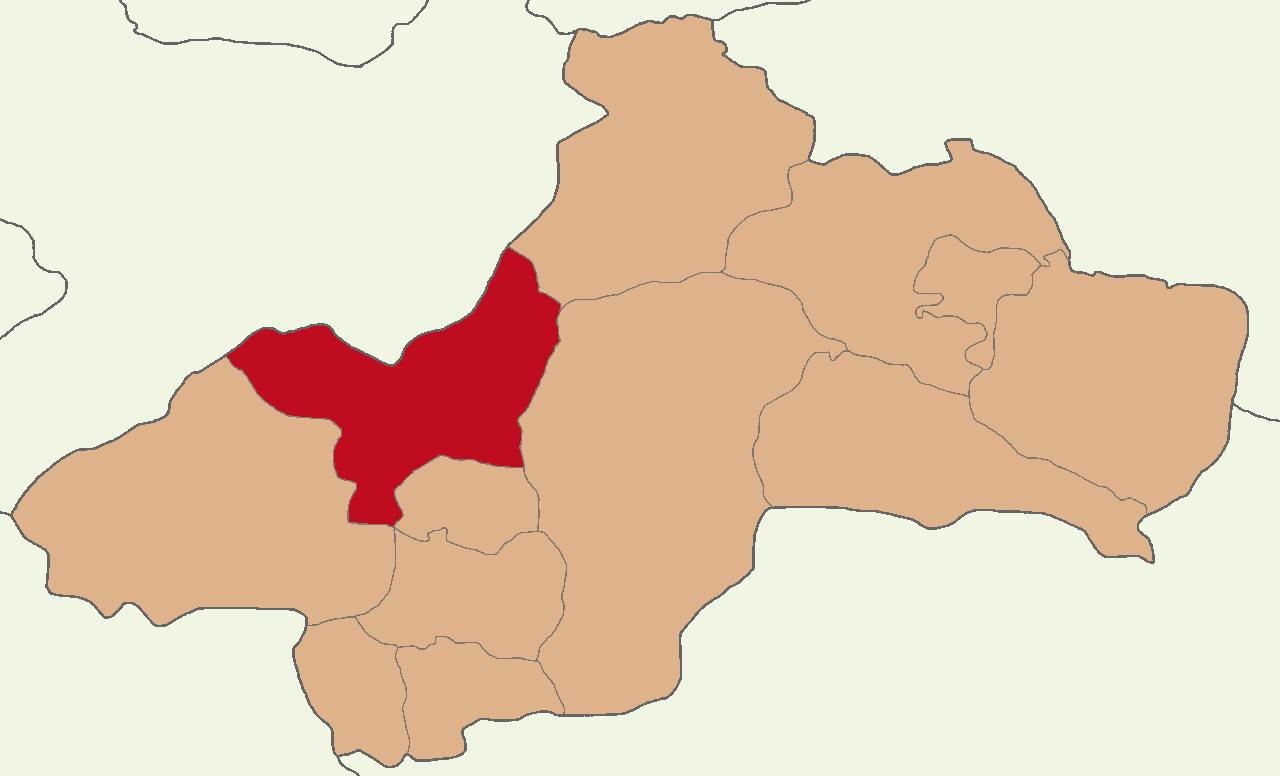
- Map showing Turhal District in Tokat Province

- Location in Turkey
- Coordinates: 40°23′N 36°05′E
- Country: Turkey
- Province: Tokat
- Seat: Turhal

Government
  - Kaymakam: Ali Gökay
- Area: 940 km^{2} (360 sq mi)
- Population (2022): 78,129
  - Density: 83/km^{2} (220/sq mi)
- Time zone: UTC+3 (TRT)
- Website: www.turhal.gov.tr

Turhal District is a district of the Tokat Province of Turkey. Its seat is the city of Turhal. Its area is 940 km^{2}, and its population is 78,129 (2022).

== Composition ==
There are two municipalities in Turhal District:

- Şenyurt
- Turhal

There are 52 villages in Turhal District:

- Ağcaşar
- Akbuğday
- Akçatarla
- Arapören
- Arzupınarı
- Ataköy
- Ayranpınar
- Bağlarpınarı
- Bahçebaşı
- Buzluk
- Çamlıca
- Çarıksız
- Çayıraltı
- Çaylı
- Çivril
- Dazya
- Derbentçi
- Dökmetepe
- Elalmış
- Erenli
- Eriklitekke
- Gökdere
- Hamide
- Hasanlı
- Kalaycık
- Kamalı
- Kargın
- Kat
- Kazancı
- Kızkayası
- Koruluk
- Kuşoturağı
- Kuytul
- Kuzalan
- Necipköy
- Ormanözü
- Samurçay
- Sarıçiçek
- Sarıkaya
- Şatıroba
- Sütlüce
- Taşlıhüyük
- Tatlıcak
- Üçyol
- Uluöz
- Ulutepe
- Yağlıalan
- Yazıtepe
- Yeniceler
- Yeniköy
- Yenisu
- Yeşilalan
