= Artova District =

District of Tokat Province, Turkey

- District
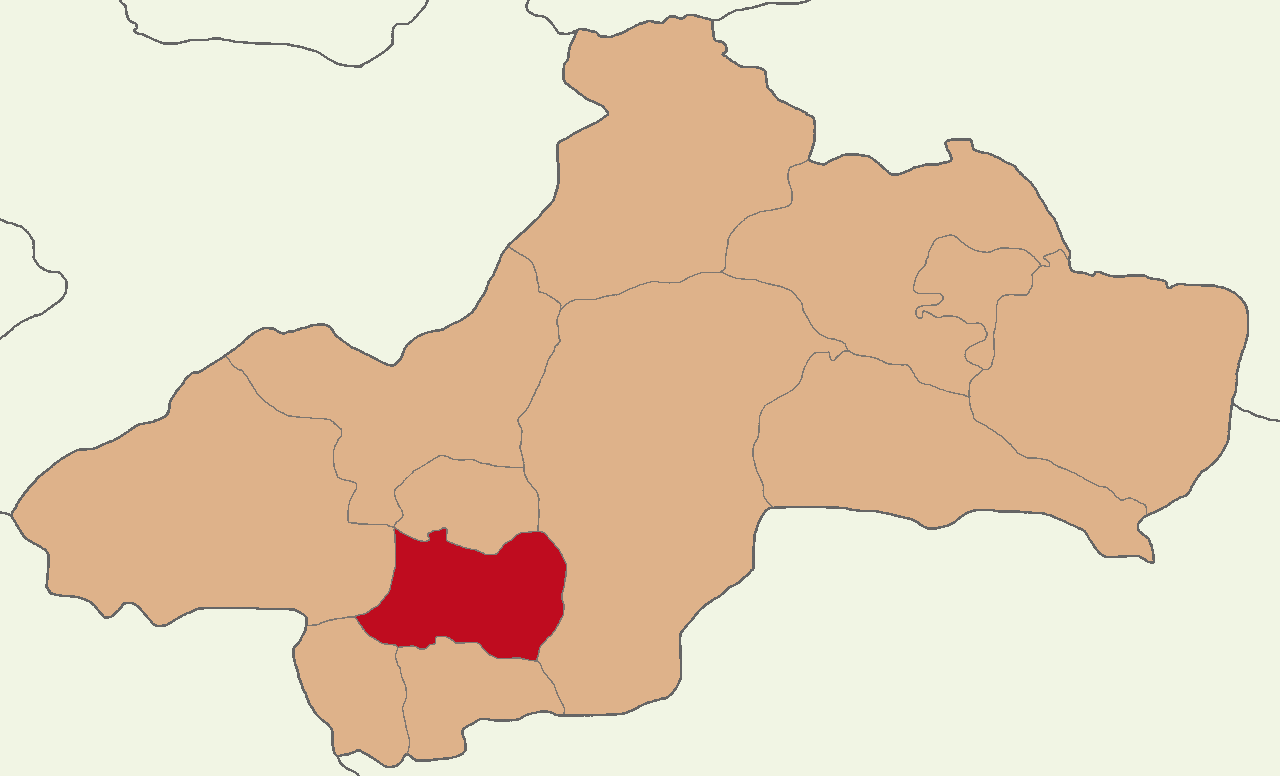
- Map showing Artova District in Tokat Province

- Location in Turkey
- Coordinates: 40°07′N 36°18′E
- Country: Turkey
- Province: Tokat
- Seat: Artova

Government
  - Kaymakam: Erkan Atam
- Area: 444 km^{2} (171 sq mi)
- Population (2022): 7,420
  - Density: 17/km^{2} (43/sq mi)
- Time zone: UTC+3 (TRT)
- Website: www.artova.gov.tr

Artova District is a district of the Tokat Province of Turkey. Its seat is the town of Artova. Its area is 444 km^{2}, and its population is 7,420 (2022).

== Composition ==
There is one municipality in Artova District:

- Artova

There are 27 villages in Artova District:

- Ağmusa
- Ahmetdanişmend
- Aktaş
- Aşağıgüçlü
- Bayırlı
- Bebekderesi
- Boyunpınar
- Devecikargın
- Evlideresi
- Gazipınarı
- Gümüşyurt
- Gürardıç
- Iğdir
- Kayaönü
- Kunduz
- Kunduzağılı
- Mertekli
- Poyrazalan
- Sağlıca
- Salur
- Tanyeli
- Taşpınar
- Tuzla
- Ulusulu
- Yağcımusa
- Yenice
- Yukarıgüçlü
