= Tokat Province =

Province of Turkey

Coordinates: 40°21′10″N 36°33′52″E

Tokat Province Tokat ili
- Province
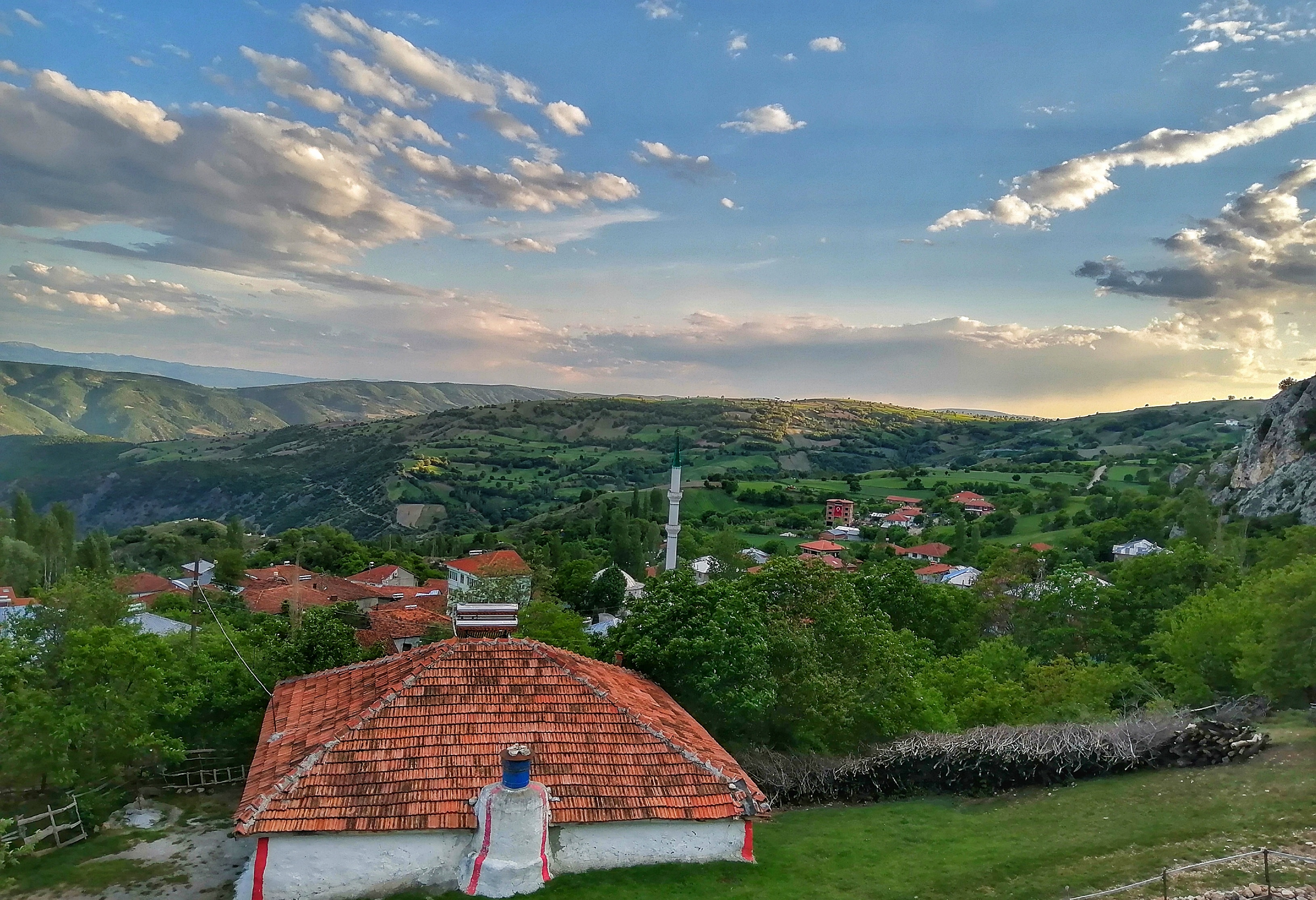
- A village in Turhal District

- Location of the province within Turkey
- Country: Turkey
- Seat: Tokat

Government
  - Vali: Abdullah Köklü
- Area: 10,042 km^{2} (3,877 sq mi)
- Population (2022): 596,454
  - Density: 59.396/km^{2} (153.83/sq mi)
- Time zone: UTC+3 (TRT)
- Area code: 0356
- Website: www.tokat.gov.tr

Tokat Province (Turkish: Tokat ili) is a province in northern Turkey. Its area is 10,042 km^{2}, and its population is 596,454 (2022). Its adjacent provinces are Amasya to the northwest, Yozgat to the southwest, Sivas to the southeast, and Ordu to the northeast. Its capital is Tokat, which lies inland of the middle Black Sea region, 422 kilometers from Ankara. The governor is Abdullah Köklü, appointed in 2024.

== Etymology ==
Evliya Çelebi explained the name of the city as Tok-at in return for the satiety of horses because of its rich barley in Turkish etymology. The Ottoman historian İsmail Hakkı explained Uzunçarşılı as Toh-kat, which means "walled city", and Özhan Öztürk, in his work called Pontus, used the word "Dahyu", which means "country, chastity" in Avesta and was first used for Cappadocia in the 6th century BC during the Achaemenid Empire. He claimed that the word "Dokeia", which was corrupted in the Greek dialect, turned into Tokat in time.

== History ==
Tokat, after remaining under the rule of the Hittites, Assyrians, Hurrians and Cimmerians, passed under the rule of Persians, Macedonians of Alexander the Great period, Cappadocia Kingdom and Pontus Kingdom, which gave the name "Comana Pontica". In 65 BC, it came under the rule of the Romans and the Byzantine Empire. Tokat Castle, which has a critical importance in Byzantine-Sassanid and Byzantine-Arab wars, is located on Hisartepe, 750 meters high, in the southwest of the city, which was taken under the rule of the Danishmendids (1071) after the Malazgirt Victory and later by the Anatolian Seljuks (1150). The oldest traces of Tokat Castle belong to the 5th or 6th century and it is known that the castle existed in these years.

== Geography ==
The city, which originates from the northern slopes of the central part of Deveci Mountains and joins Yeşilırmak on the left, is located on the slopes of a river valley, and is located at the junction of important roads connecting the Central Black Sea coast and Central and Eastern Anatolia in a very rugged region. Total area of the province is 10,042 km^{2}. In terms of the footprint area it covers 1.3% of Turkey's land. It is 623 meters above sea level. Geographical coordinates lie between 39 ° 51 '- 40 ° 55' north latitudes and 35 ° 27'- 37 ° 39 'East longitudes.

== Districts ==
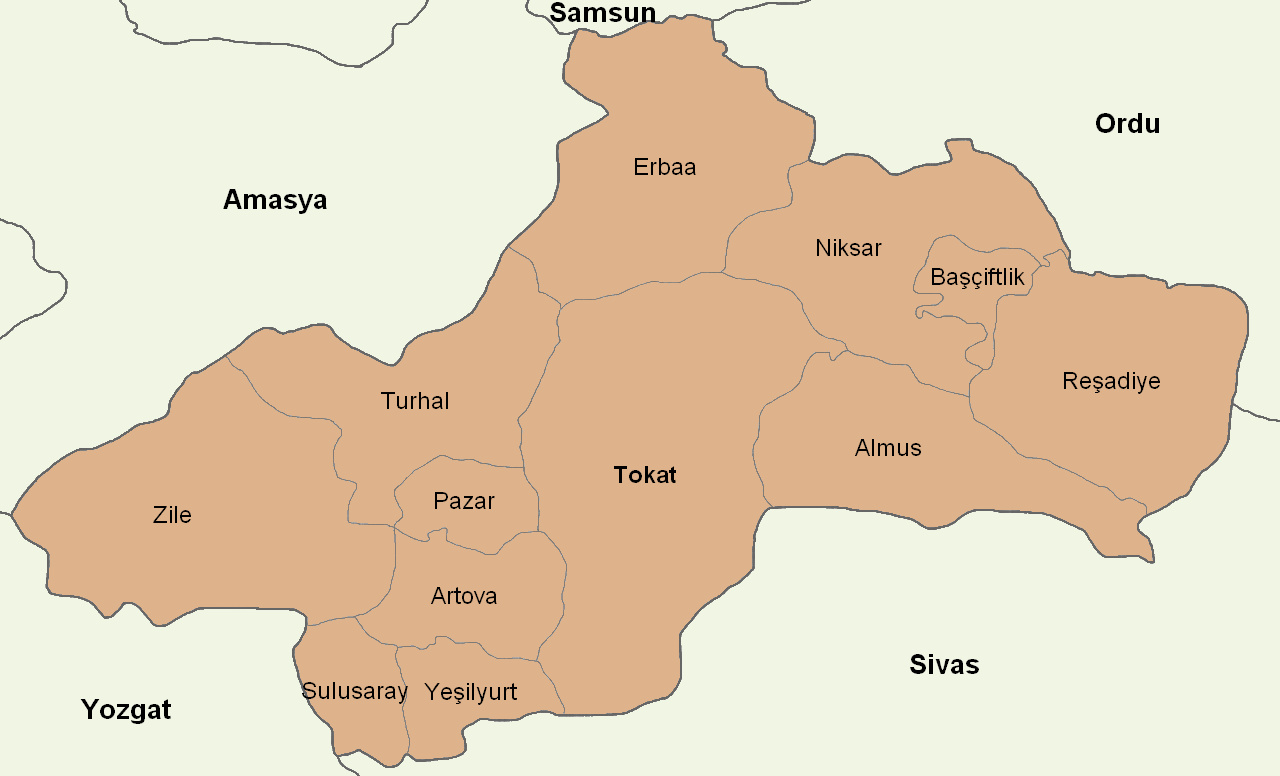

Tokat province is divided into 12 districts (capital district in bold):

- Almus
- Artova
- Başçiftlik
- Erbaa
- Niksar
- Pazar
- Reşadiye
- Sulusaray
- **Tokat**
- Turhal
- Yeşilyurt
- Zile

== Landmarks ==
Two notable monuments in this province are the Hatuniye Külliyesi of the 15th century, built by Sultan Bayezid II, and a Seljuk bridge spanning the Yeşilırmak River, belonging to the 12th century. The Latifoğlu Mansion is a third, which is an example of the traditional architecture of a Turkish house of the 19th century, restored recently to its original state. Tokat Castle and Zile, Niksar and Turhal castles located in Tokat district are frequented by local and foreign tourists. In the city center of Tokat, the historical Tokat Clock Tower and the historical Gök Madrasa are placed. Additionally, The Yağıbasan Madrasah, known as the first madrasah built in Anatolia, the historical Pazar Caravanserai and the Ballıca Cave are located.

== Economy ==
The people of Tokat earn their living from agriculture, animal husbandry and trade. The city is an ideal city for a peaceful life with its regular city structure, numerous natural beauties and economic shopping conditions. Trade and industry of Tokat, whose economy is based on agriculture and animal husbandry, is concentrated in the city center. Tokat Organized Industrial Zone is the area where the city's only industrial activity continues. Again, with its geographical location, it is a city that is suitable for agriculture. In agricultural production, tomatoes, peppers, cherries, potatoes, grapes and sugar beet are the products that have the largest share in the regional production.

== Gallery ==
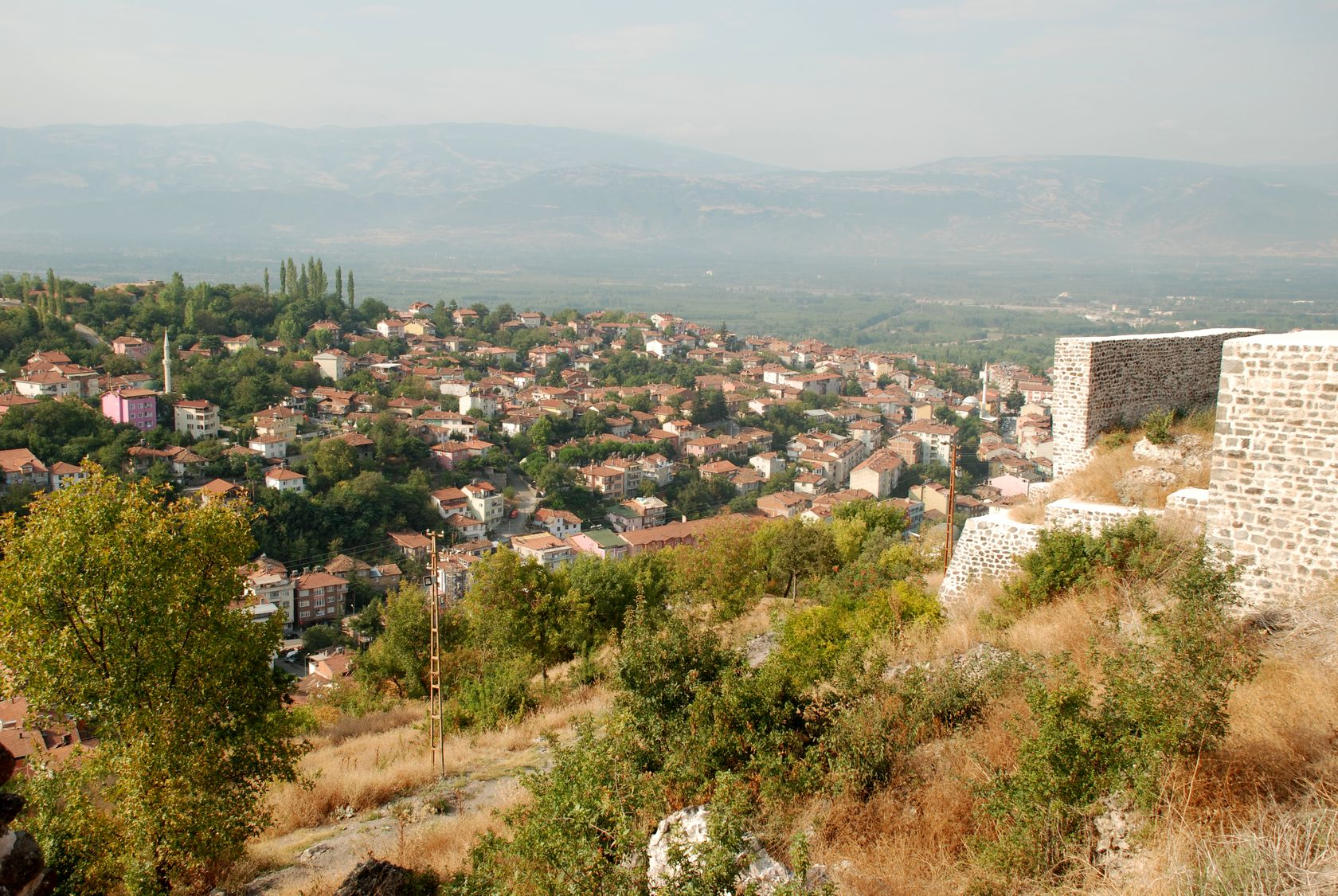
Niksar, Tokat

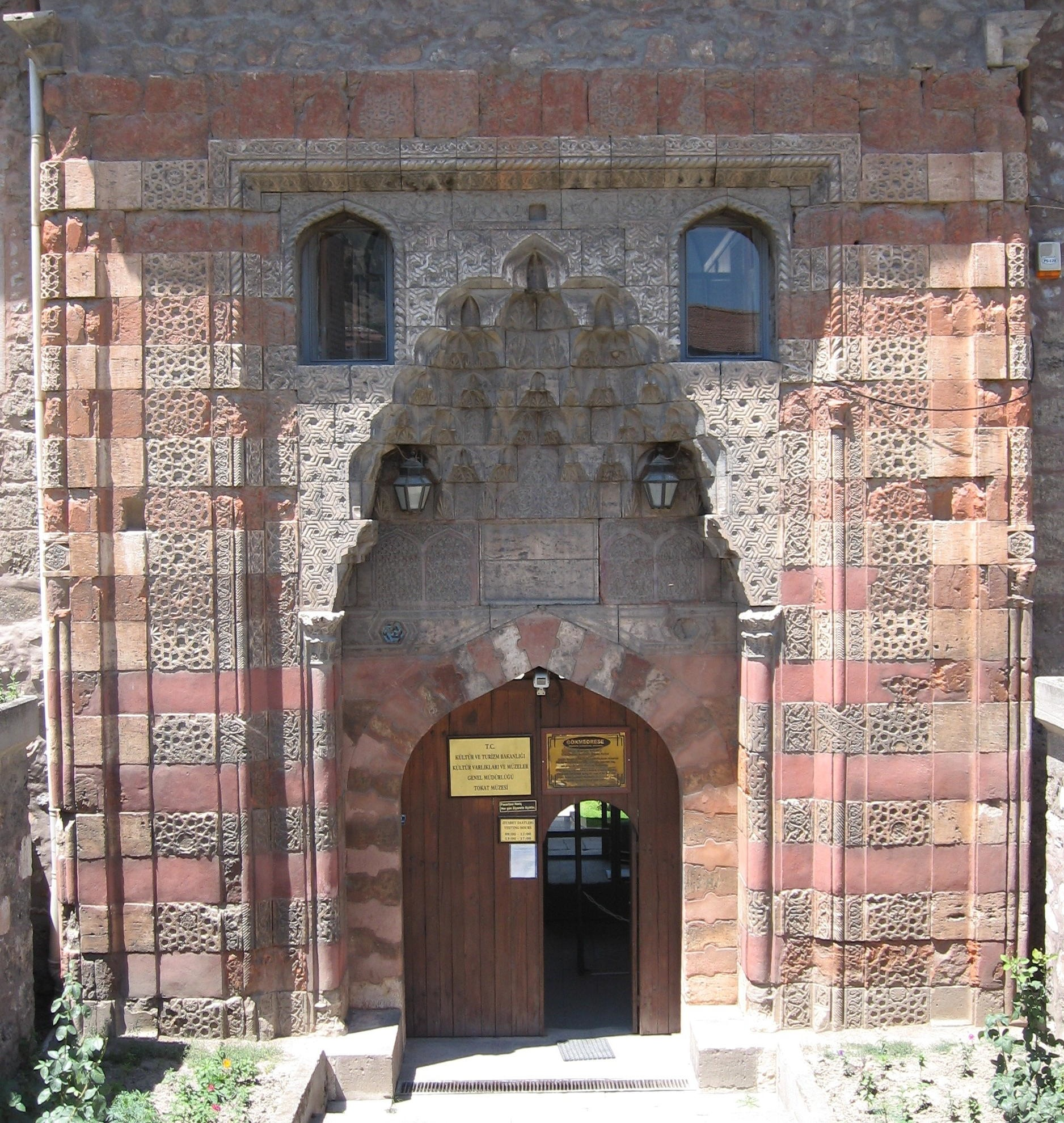
Gök Medrese in Tokat

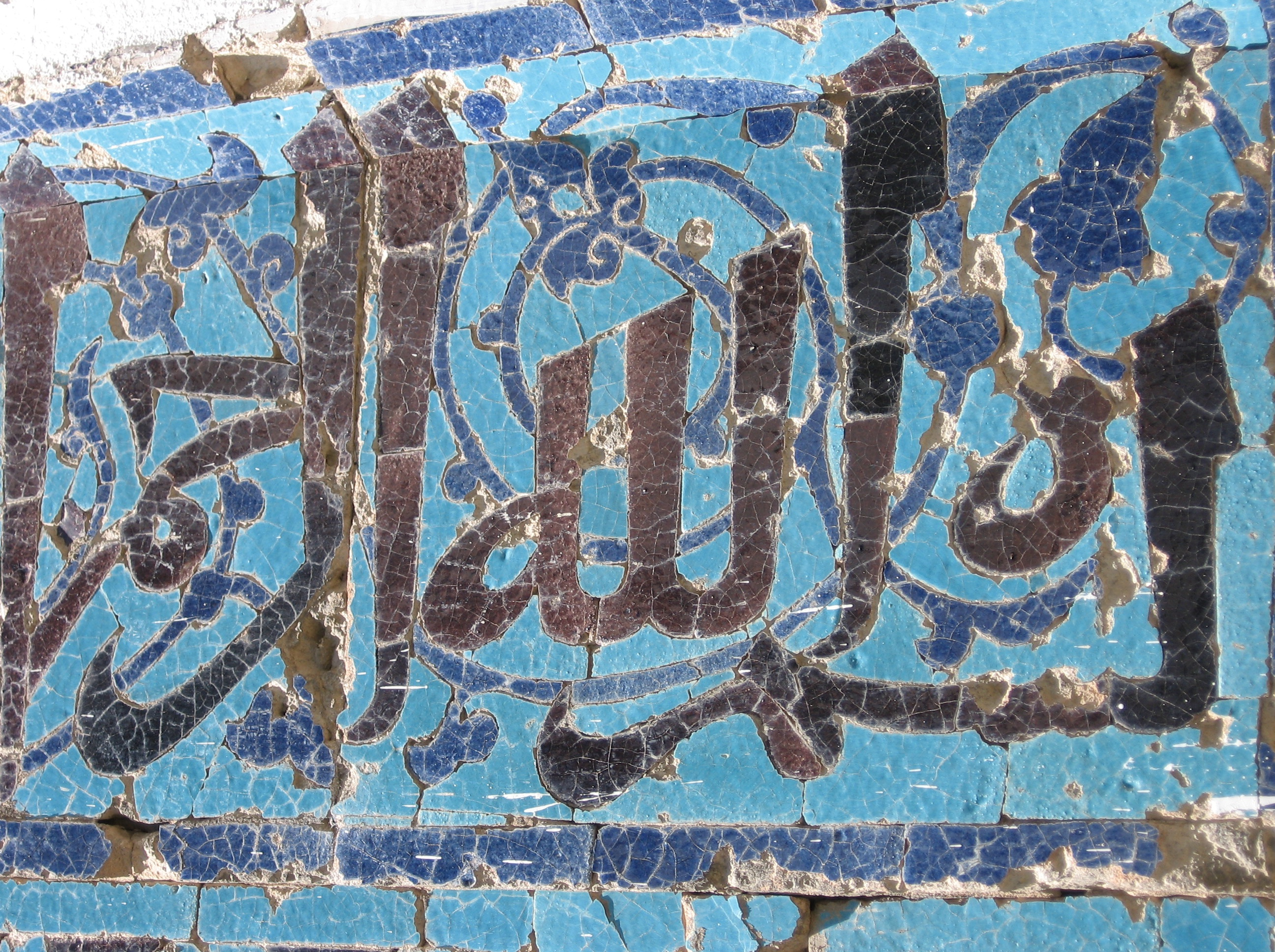
Polychrome tiles from Gök Medrese

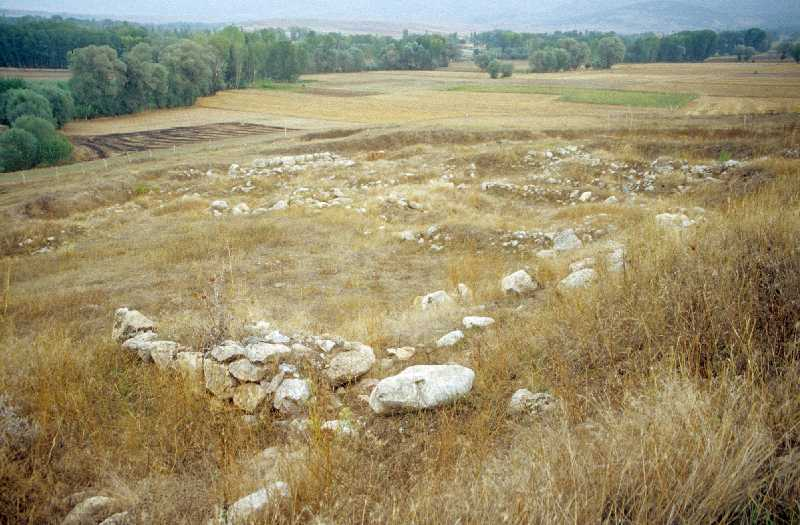
Maşat Höyük, a Hittite archaeological site

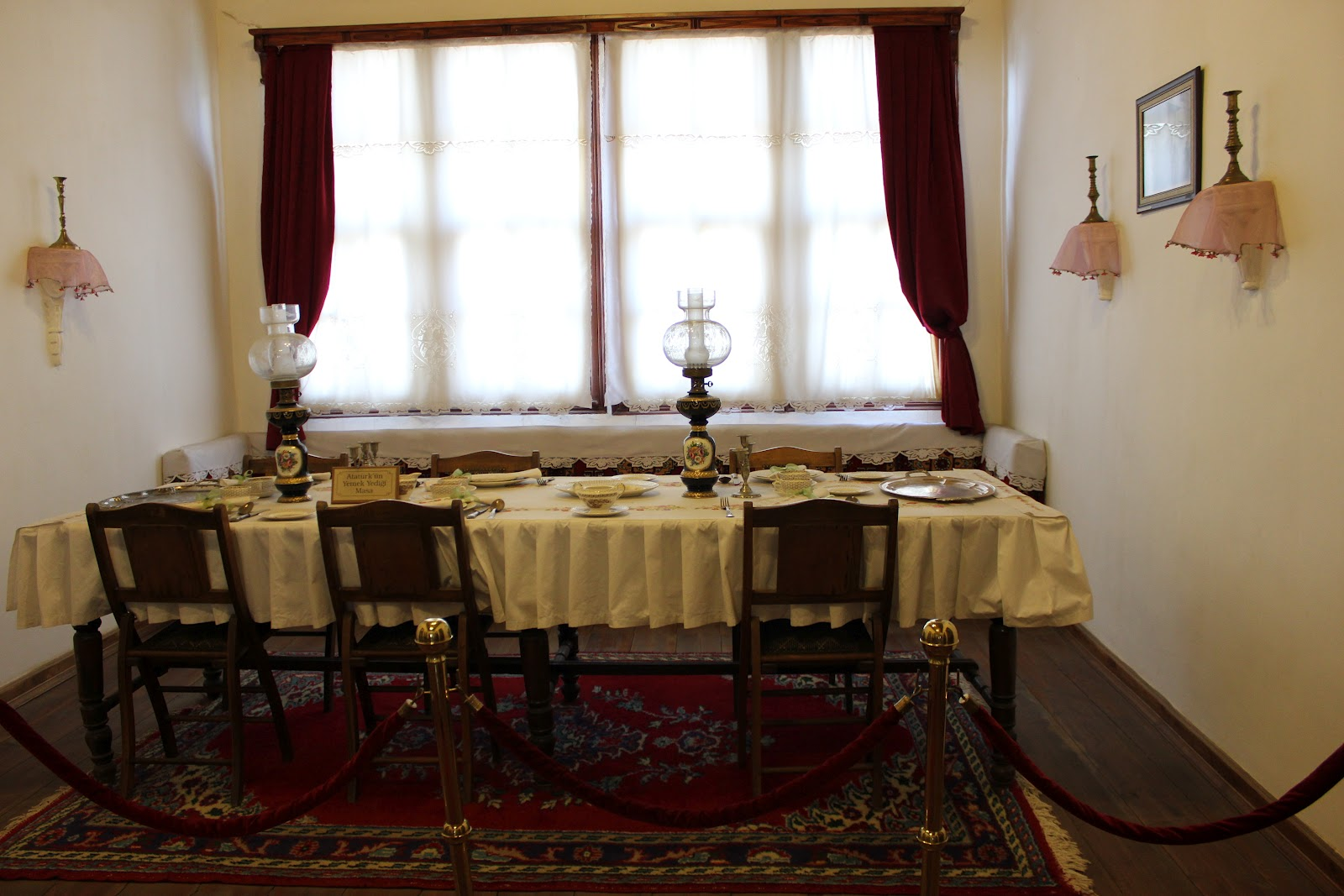
Atatürk's House Museum

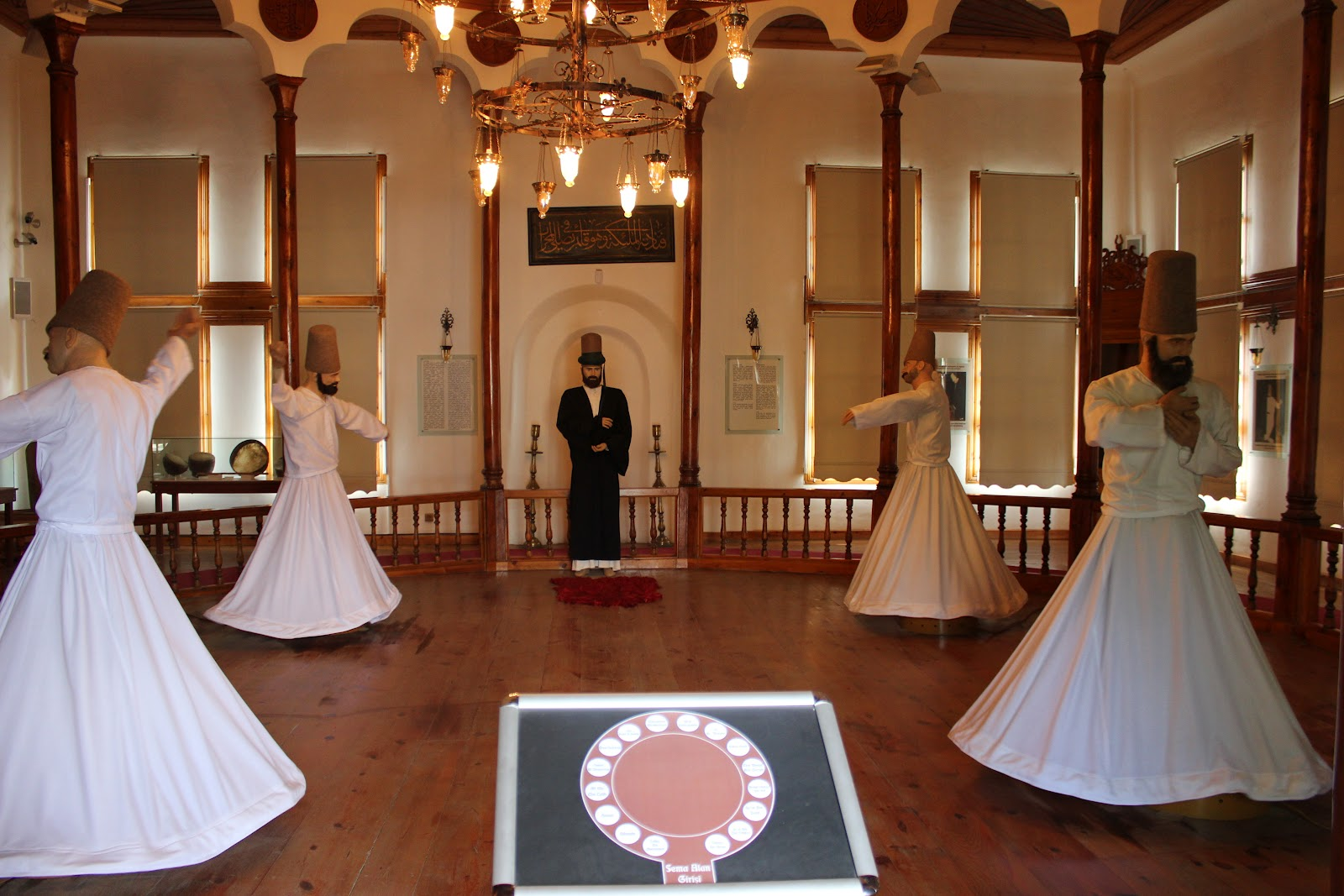
Tokat Mevlevihanesi
