= Taskasaplidis =

Greek surname

Taskasaplidis (Greek: Τασκασαπλίδης) is a Greek last name (or family name). It is believed that the name derived from a local area of the city of Istanbul (formerly Constantinople) Turkey, called "Taşkasap (Tashkasap)". The patronymic suffix -idis, used mostly from Greeks in the Pontus and Asia Minor regions. The patronymic suffix -li, sometimes is used to declare that the name derived from a location or origin. For example, the common Greek family name "Tokatlidis", uses the infix -li (also the suffix -idis) and the name derives from the city name Tokat (Greek:Τοκάτη), Turkey.
