= Mehmet Emin Tokadi =

Ottoman calligrapher

Mehmet Emin Tokadi (fully Mehmed Emin bin Hasan bin Omar Nakkash Tokadi; 1664–1745) was the son of one of Aziz Mahmud Amawi's derwishes. Born at Tokat, during Ottoman times, he died in Istanbul.

Nicknamed Jemaleddin, he was officially known as Abul-Amana and Abu-Mansur. He is one of the well known Sufi saints of Istanbul and authored many works in Arabic, Turkish, and Persian. His training included the Naqshbandi, Qadiri, Shadhili, and Shettari ways. In addition, he was a calligrapher and a scholar of hadith, Muhaddith.

His grave is within the Soğukkuyu Piri Mehmed Pasha Mosque and medrese cemetery in Unkapanı, Istanbul, on the way up to the Bozdoğan Kemeri (Roman aqueduct).
