= Tokat Museum =

Museum in Tokat, Turkey

- Tokat Müzesi
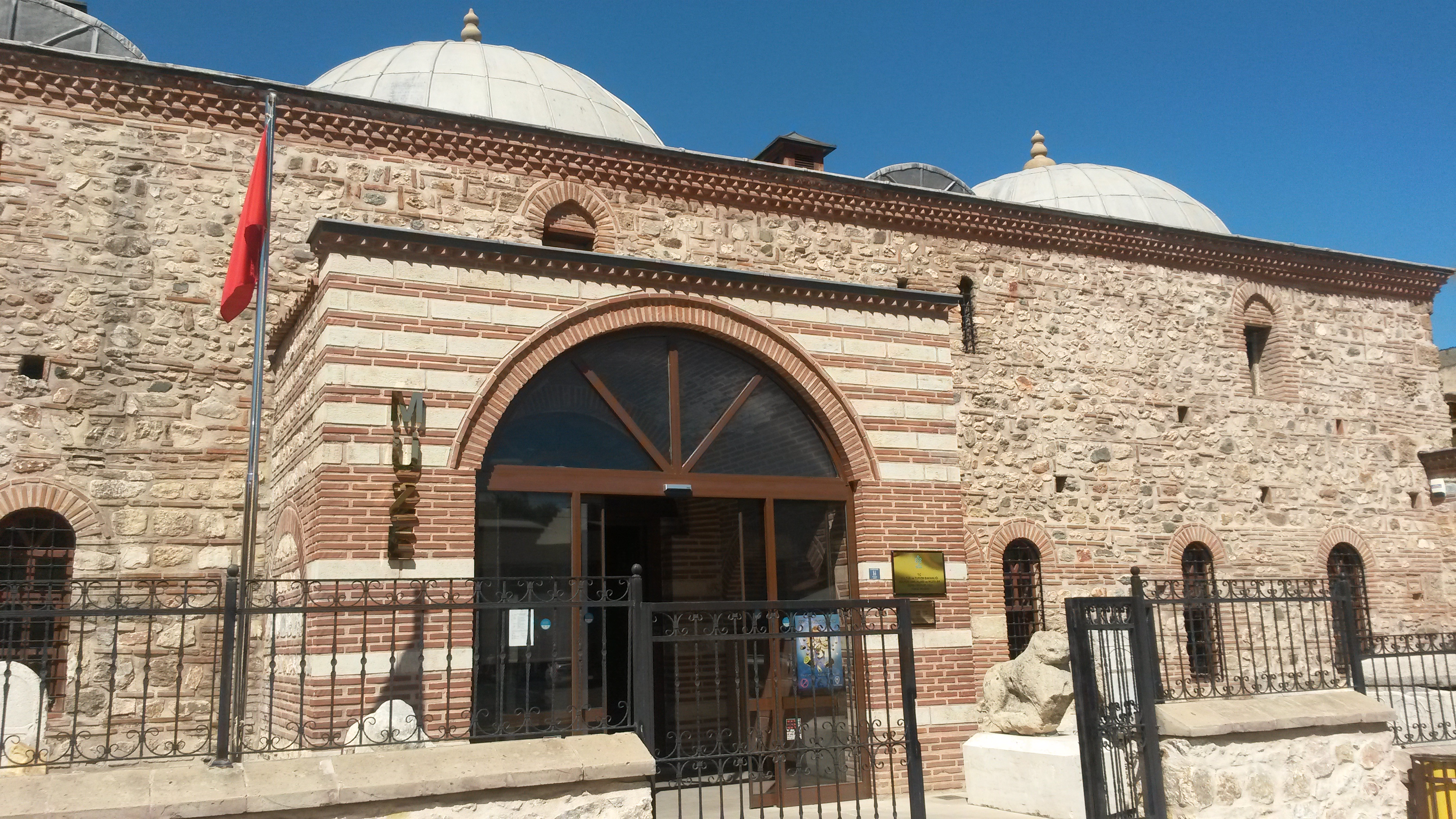

- Tokat Museum
- Established: 2012; 14 years ago
- Location: Camii Kebir Mahallesi Sulusokak Caddesi No:86 Tokat, Turkey
- Coordinates: 40°18′28″N 36°32′49″E
- Type: Archaeology, Ethnography
- Collections: Hellenistic period, Roman Empire, Byzantine Empire, Anatolian Seljuks, Ottoman Empire
- Collection size: 36253
- Owner: Ministry of Culture and Tourism
- Website: Anamur Museum

Tokat Museum is a museum in Tokat, Turkey. It houses historic finds from the region including sculptures and coins. Many of the items originate in the Anatolian Seljuks era.

== History ==
An earlier museum was originally located in Gökmedrese, a historic building in Tokat. On 18 September 2012, the museum was moved to a bedesten (covered market) called Arastalı which was probably built during the reign of Ottoman sultan Mehmet I (r.1413-1421). The bedesten is on Sulusokak street in the Camii Kebir quarter

== The museum exhibits ==
The archaeology section of the museum houses Hittiten clay tablets from Maşat Höyük, a sword from the Hellenistic age, and bronze sculptures from the Roman age. The collection includes coins from various civilizations, and especially from the Anatolian Seljuks era. In the ethnographic section, the most important item is the handwritten Koran of 1191, from the Anatolian Seljuks era. There are also examples of ceramics. Two rooms of the museum exhibit hand-painted kerchief manufacturing and copper works, two of the popular crafts of Tokat during the Ottoman Empire.
