= Tokat Castle =

Ancient citadel in Tokat, Turkey

Coordinates: 40.3175°N 36.5481°E

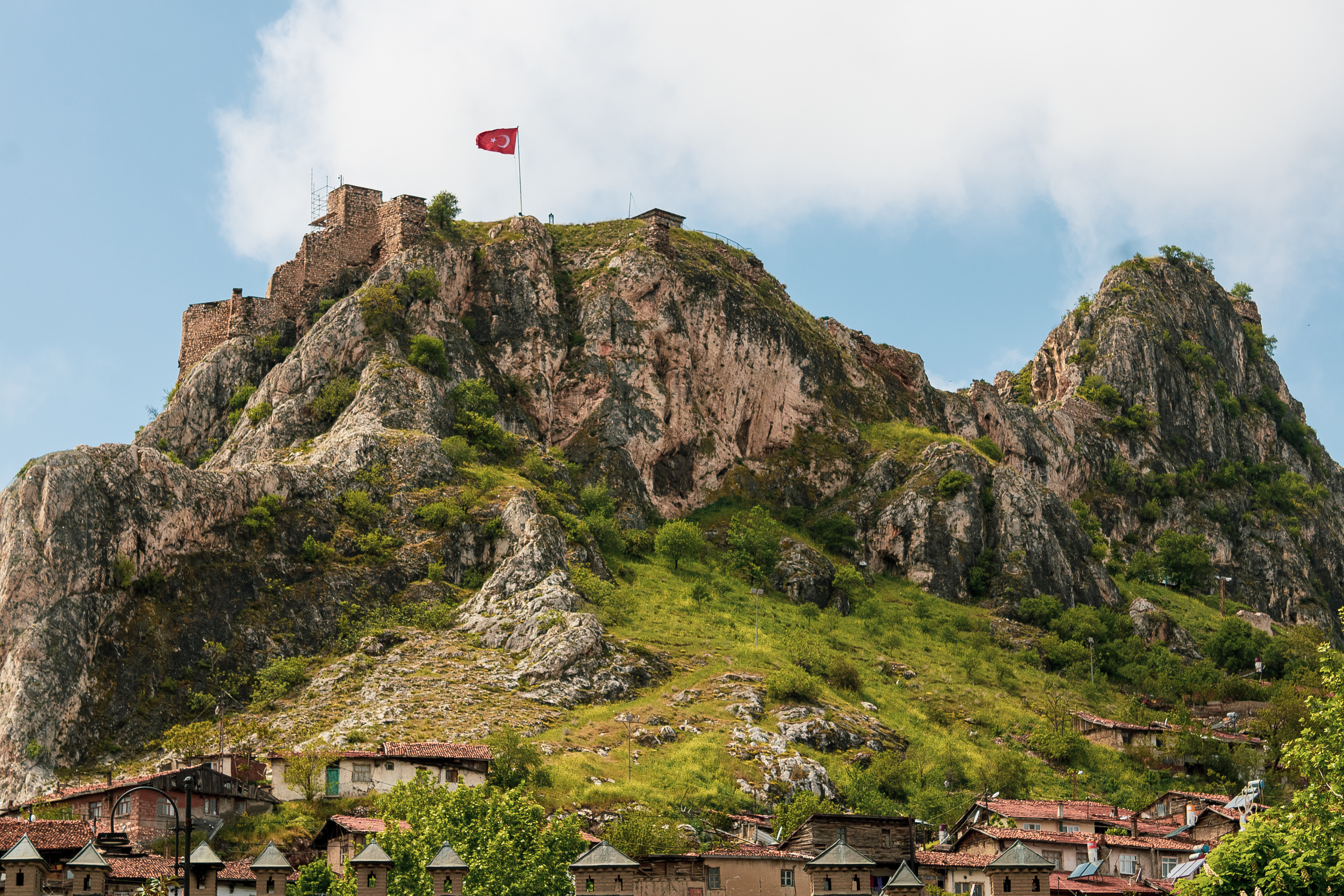
Tokat Castle seen from below

Tokat Castle is an ancient citadel with 28 towers built on top of a rocky peak in the center of Tokat, Turkey.

While its first residents are unknown, the city's history dates back to 3,000 BC. The Hittites and Persians ruled over the area. The earliest known artifacts of the castle date back to the 5th century, and its first recorded residents were Christian groups migrating from Comana Pontica. The castle was under the control of the Byzantine Empire until its takeover by Danishmend Gazi in 1074 and eventual rule by the Great Seljuq Empire. It went through renovations in the Seljuq and Ottoman periods. Because it was used as a prison for rebels and government administrators at times, it was also called Çardar-ı Bedevi, meaning the Wild Arbor.

Vlad the Impaler (Dracula) was one of its inmates early in the 15th century when was he was imprisoned here for a short period by the Ottoman sultan Murad II. The castle is being restored and its secret passage is open to visitors.
