= Tokat Airport =

Airport in Tokat, Turkey

Tokat Airport Tokat Havalimanı
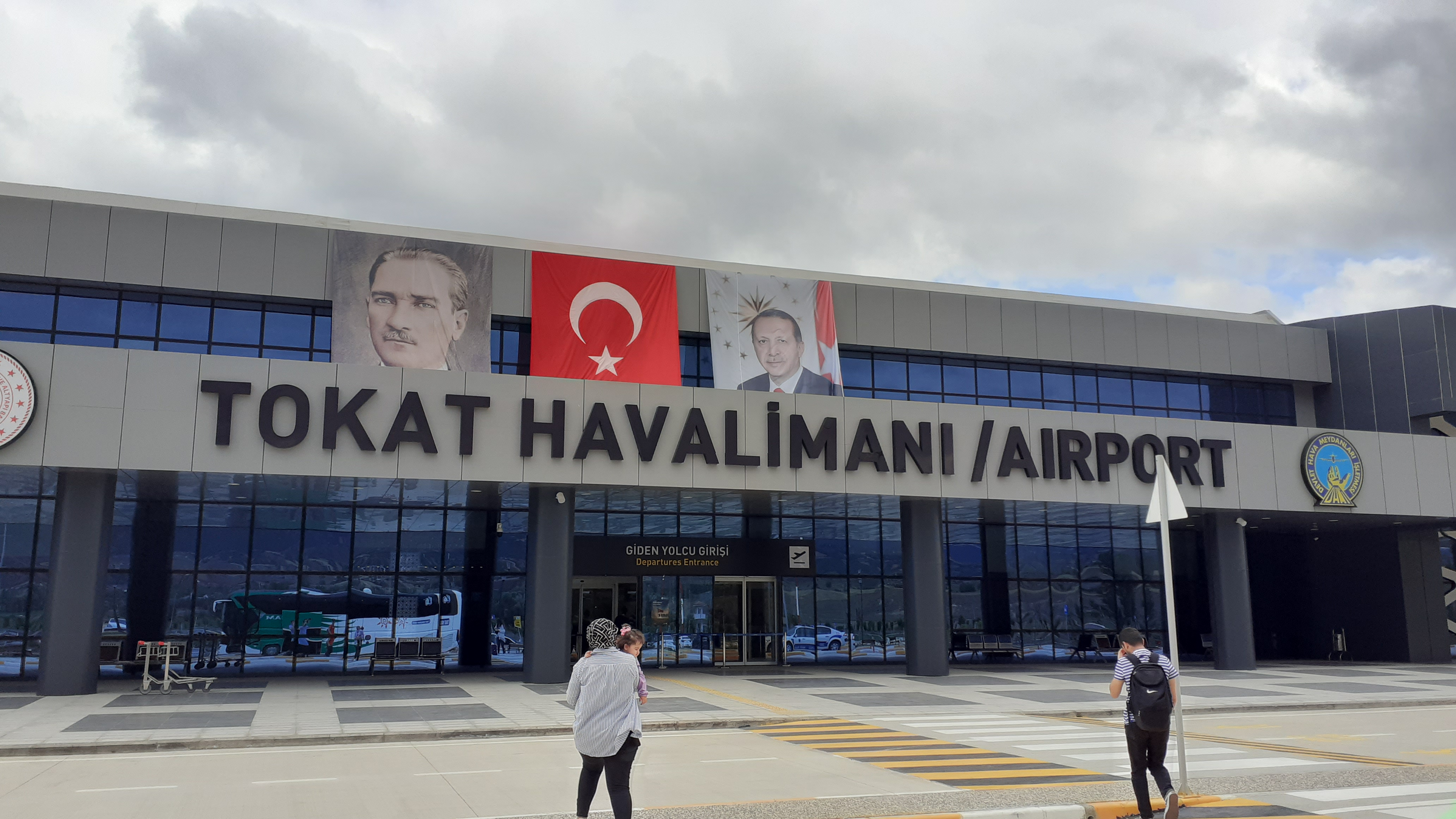
- IATA: TJK; ICAO: LTAW

Summary
- Airport type: Public
- Operator: General Directorate of State Airports Authority (DHMİ)
- Serves: Tokat, Turkey
- Location: Tokat, Turkey
- Opened: 1995; 31 years ago (initial opening); 25 March 2022; 4 years ago (current facilities)
- Elevation AMSL: 558 m / 1,830 ft
- Coordinates: 40°18′42″N 36°22′25″E
- Website: tokat.dhmi.gov.tr

Map
- Location of airport in Turkey

Runways
Direction	Length		Surface
Direction	m	ft	Surface
06/24	2,700	8,858	Concrete

Statistics (2025)
- Annual passenger capacity: 2,000,000
- Passengers: 174,619
- Passenger change 2024–25: ▲12%
- Aircraft movements: 1,986
- Movements change 2024–25: ▲36%

Tokat Airport (IATA: TJK, ICAO: LTAW) is an airport built in 1995 in Tokat, the city in inner Black Sea region of Turkey. Flights from the airport were halted and resumed again several times, most recently in 2017. Construction on a new airport started in 2018 and was completed in 2022. Since March 2022, Turkish Airlines operates flights from Tokat Airport to Istanbul.

== History ==
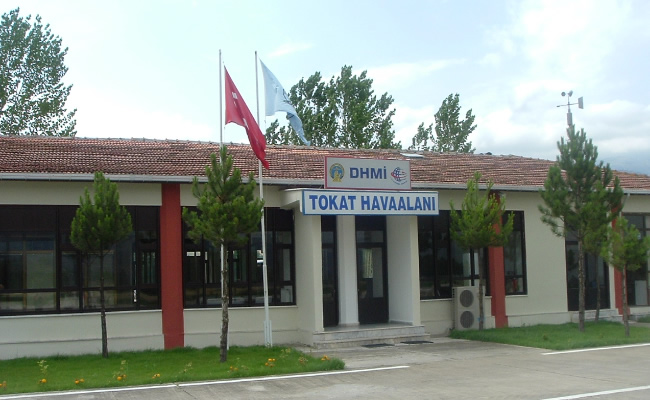
The old terminal in 2009

The initial airport was constructed in 1995. Tokat Airport was closed in 2001, re-opened in 2006, and closed again in 2008. Also in 2008, a nearby mosque minaret was shortened for posing a risk to flight safety. Operations continued in 2010 until April 2017, when all scheduled flights were stopped due to Borajet, the only carrier then serving the airport, ceasing operations. At a length of 1700 meters, the old runway was only long enough for smaller regional aircraft to land, which were only operated by Borajet in Turkey.

The construction of a new airport started next to the old one in 2018. Costing 1.2 billion Turkish lira, the airport features a 2,700 m (8,900 ft) runway, and the terminal building covers an area of 16,000 m^{2} (170,000 sq ft). The new airport has a capacity of seven aircraft, and is able to accommodate wide-body and cargo aircraft. The airport was re-opened on 25 March 2022.

On 25 March 2022, operations resumed from the re-built airport from after a five-year absence of passenger traffic.

== Airlines and destinations ==
The following airlines operate regular scheduled and charter flights at Tokat Airport:

Airlines	Destinations
AJet	Istanbul–Sabiha Gökçen
Pegasus Airlines	Izmir
Turkish Airlines	Istanbul

== Traffic statistics ==
Tokat Airport passenger traffic statistics
Year (months)	Domestic	% change	International	% change	Total	% change
2025	169,218	▲11%	5,401	▲45%	174,619	▲12%
2024	152,018	▲4%	3,715	▲21%	155,733	▲4%
2023	146,734	▲68%	3,068	▲257%	149,802	▲69%
2022	87,585	-	860	-	88,445	-
2021	-	-	-	-	-	-
2020	-	-	-	-	-	-
2019	-	-	-	-	-	-
2018	-	▼100%	-	-	-	▼100%
2017	13,058	▼75%	-	-	13,058	▼75%
2016	51,744	▼8%	-	-	51,744	▼8%
2015	56,165	▲60%	-	-	56,165	▲60%
2014	35,067	▲97%	-	-	35,067	▲97%
2013	17,796	▼30%	-	-	17,796	▼30%
2012	25,425	▼17%	-	-	25,425	▼17%
2011	30,516	▲122%	-	-	30,516	▲122%
2010	13,723	-	-	-	13,723	-
2009	-	▼100%	-	-	-	▼100%
2008	21,828	▼51%	-	-	21,828	▼51%
2007	44,483	Steady	-	Steady	44,483	Steady

^1: 2022 statistics correspond to the last 3 months of 2022 since the reopening of the airport.
