= Symeon Savvidis =

Greek painter

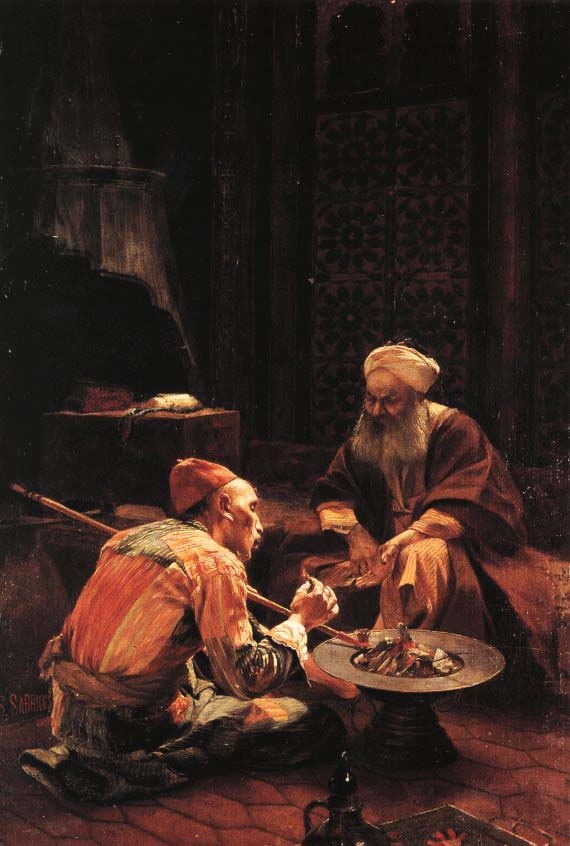
Lighting the Tobacco Pipe

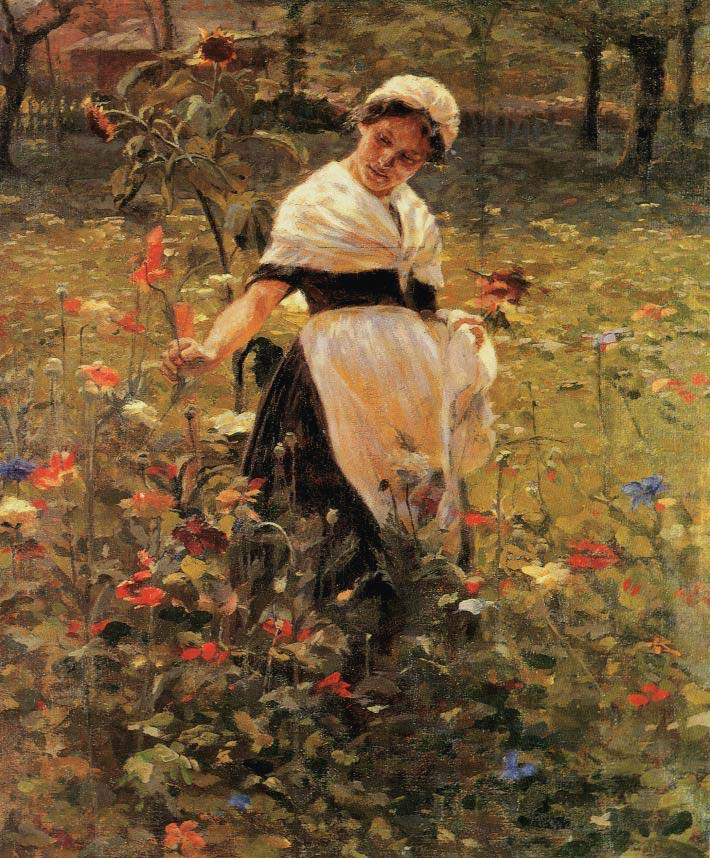
A Study of Colors

Symeon Savvidis, or Sabbides (Greek: Συμεών Σαββίδης; 1859, Tokat - February 1927, Athens) was a Greek painter; influenced by the Munich School. His most familiar works are on Turkish themes.

== Biography ==
His parents were prosperous merchants, and he was originally sent to study at the School of Commerce on the island of Heybeliada. In his spare time, he displayed a talent for drawing and sketching. As a result, he was enrolled in the architecture school at Athens Polytechnic University, where he studied from 1878 to 1880. While there, he made the acquaintance of Stefanos Zafiropoulos, a shipping magnate who was a benefactor for numerous charities. With his support, Savvidis was able to attend the Academy of Fine Arts Munich, where he studied with Wilhelm von Diez, Ludwig von Löfftz and Nikolaos Gyzis.

Upon completing his studies in 1887, he decided to remain there and stayed for over forty years. During that time, he made several trips to Anatolia to gather material for his work. He held numerous exhibitions in Berlin, Leipzig, Hamburg, Vienna, Paris and London. Occasionally, he would have a showing in Athens. In his later years, he abandoned the Munich style in favor of more colorful, Impressionistic works. A man of wide ranging interests, he used the colors of dawn and sunset to develop a method for weather prediction.

Despite his wide ranging activity, his works never achieved commercial success. The First World War broke most of his professional connections and left him close to poverty.

In 1925, poor and sick, he moved to Athens, where he died two years later. A major retrospective was held there in 1931. The National Gallery of Greece presented a large exhibition of his paintings in 2006.
