= Tokat =

- Municipality
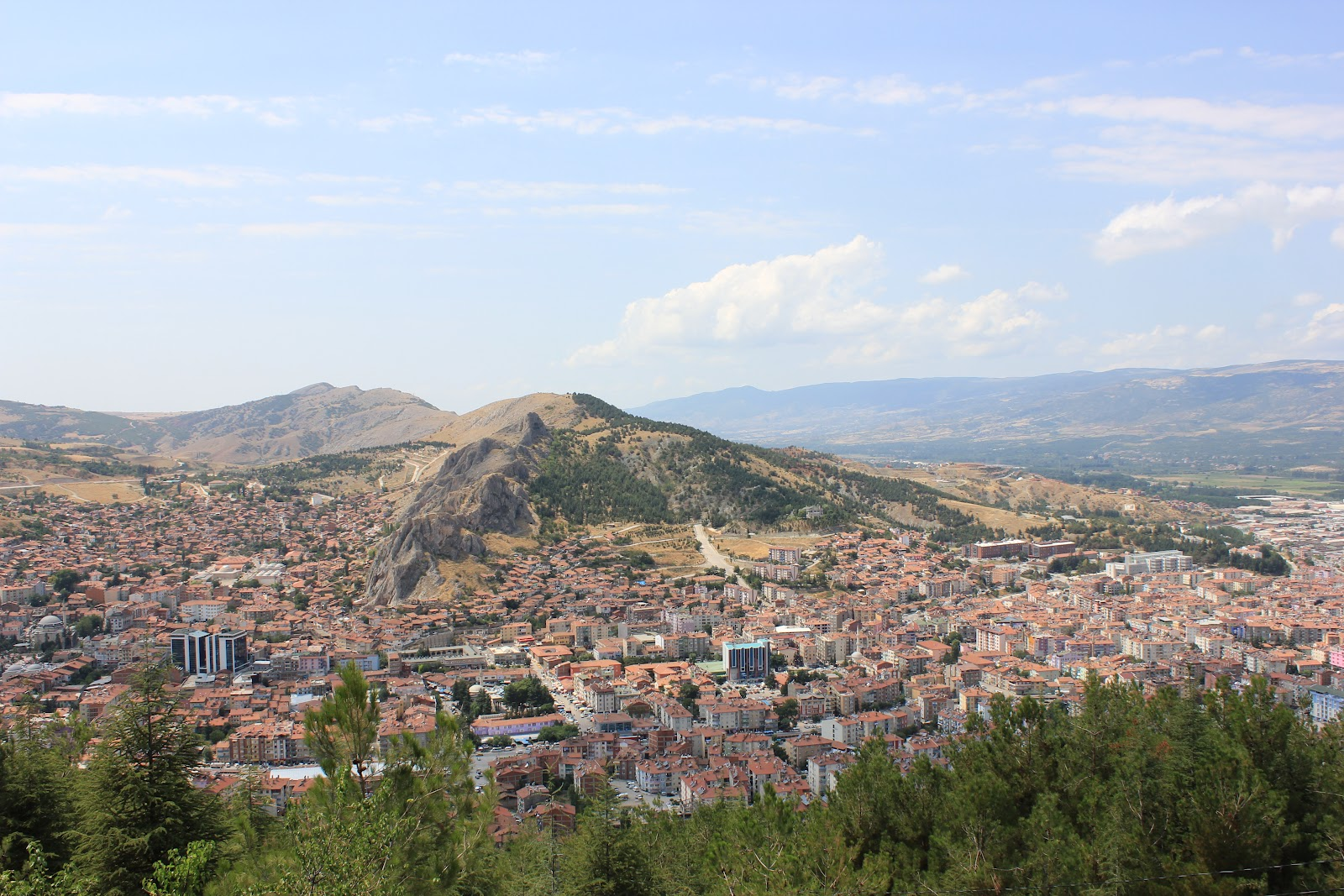

- Location within Turkey
- Coordinates: 40°18′50″N 36°33′15″E
- Country: Turkey
- Province: Tokat
- District: Tokat

Government
  - Mayor: Mehmet Kemal Yazıcıoğlu (MHP)
- Elevation: 623 m (2,044 ft)
- Population (2022): 163,405
- Time zone: UTC+3 (TRT)
- Postal code: 60100/60200
- Area code: 0356
- Website: www.tokat.bel.tr

Tokat is a city of Turkey in the mid-Black Sea region of Anatolia. It is the seat of Tokat Province and Tokat District. Its population is 163,405 (2022). It is located at the confluence of the Tokat River (Tokat Suyu) with the Yeşilırmak.

== History ==
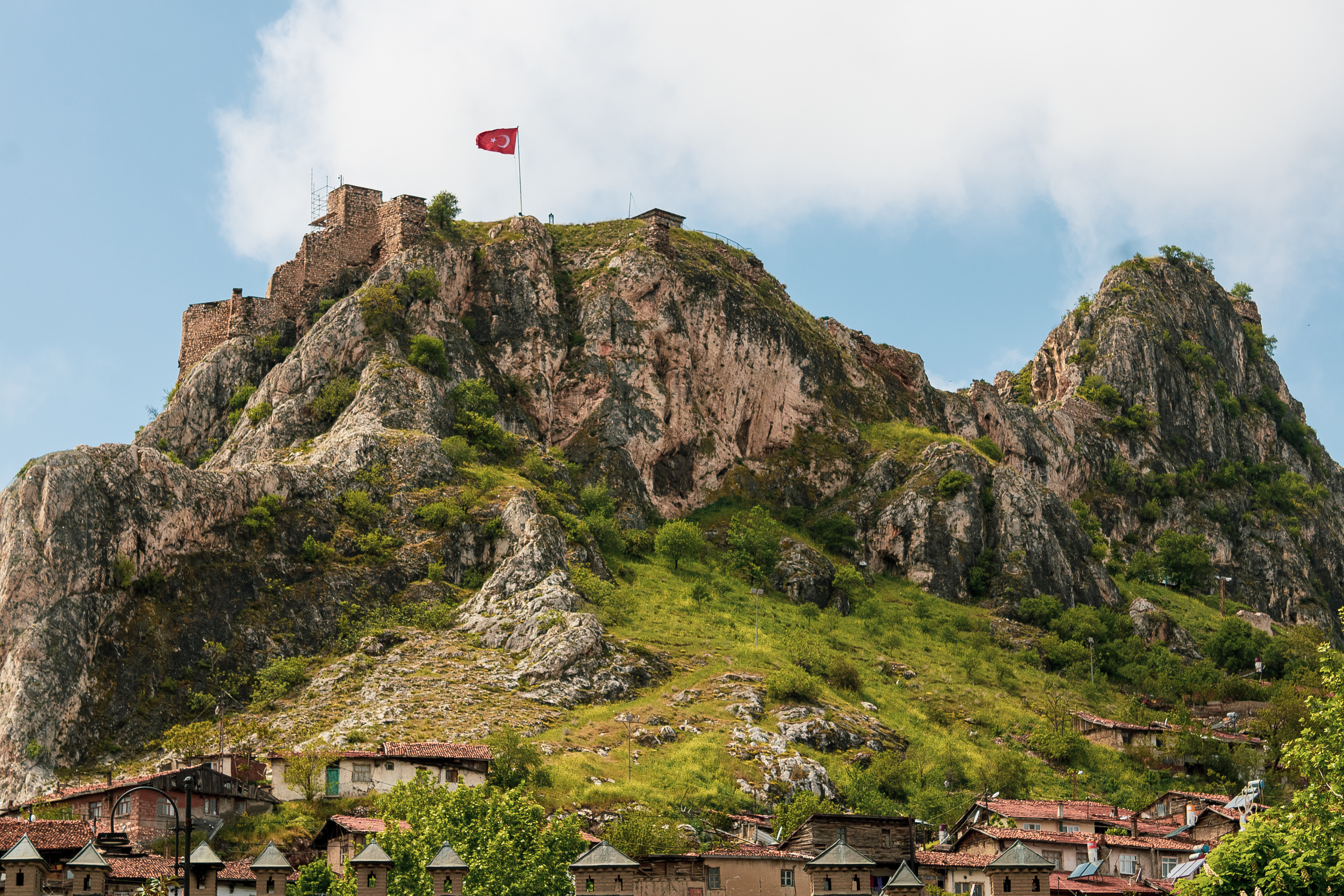
Tokat Castle seen from below.

The city was established in the Hittite era. During the time of King Mithradates VI of Pontus, it was one of his many strongholds in Asia Minor.

Known as Evdokia or Eudoxia, (Note: The town was called "Tokation", then it was renamed to Evdokia (Evdoksia), after Byzantine Emperor Heraclius' daughter, Eudoxia Epiphania.) ecclesiastically it was later incorporated into the western part of the Byzantine Greek Empire of Trebizond.

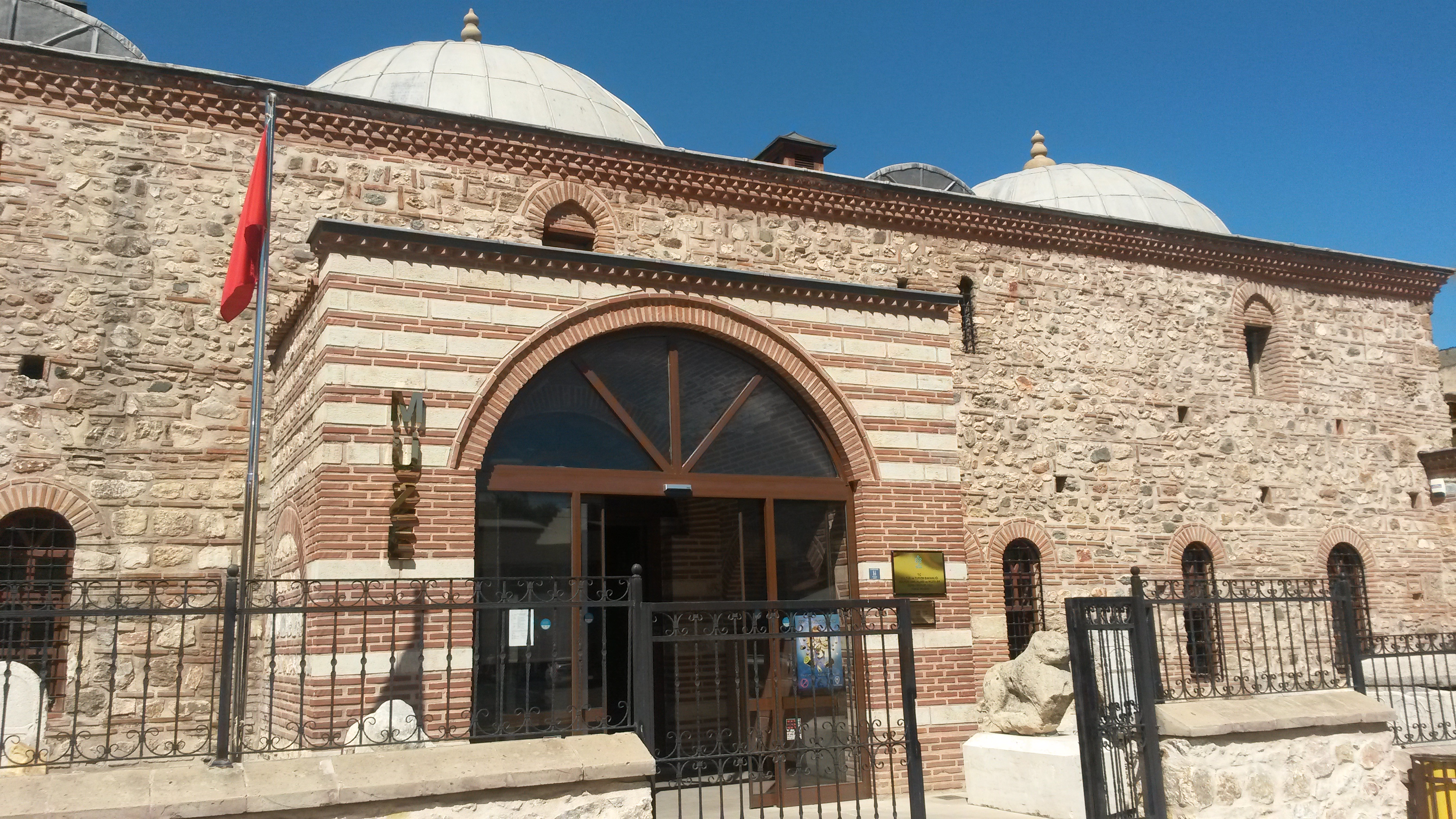
Tokat Museum.

Some authors like Guillaume de Jerphanion and William Mitchell Ramsay identified Tokat with the ancient and medieval Dazimon, with Ramsay saying, "Dazimon, which seems to have been a fortress, must have been the modern Tokat, with its strong castle.

Henri Grégoire, on the other hand, refuted this as implausible, because a 13th-century text written by Ibn Bibi clearly distinguishes Dazimon and Tokat as separate places. Instead, he said, Tokat should be identified with the town of Dokeia (Greek: Δόκεια) mentioned in another 10th-century text, by Theophanes Continuatus, which says that the Byzantine general John Kourkouas was born in a village near Dokeia sometime in the 9th century. According to Grégoire, the name "Dokeia" does not have a Greek etymology and probably represents an old Anatolian place name. The supposed derivation from "Eudokia", he claimed, is only a folk etymology that came much later.

After the Battle of Manzikert the town, like most of Asia Minor, came under the control of the Seljuk Turks. After the death of Sultan Suleiman ibn Qutulmish in 1086, the Emir Danishmend Gazi took control of the area, operating from his power base in the town of Sivas. It would be many decades before the Seljuks re-took control of that region, in the reign of Kilij Arslan II. After the Battle of Köse Dağ, Seljuk hold over the region was lost, and local Emirs such as the Eretna took power until the rise of the Ottomans, who captured the town in 1392 under Sultan Bayazid I.

== Climate ==
Tokat has a hot-summer Mediterranean climate, or alternatively a continental climate (Köppen: Csa, Trewartha: Dc). Due to the relatively high altitude and inland location, winters are fairly cold with average lows below the freezing point and significant snowfall.

Highest recorded temperature:47.2 °C (117.0 °F) on 29 July 2025
Lowest recorded temperature:−23.4 °C (−10.1 °F) on 20 January 1972

Climate data for Tokat (1991–2020, extremes 1929–2025)
| Month | Jan | Feb | Mar | Apr | May | Jun | Jul | Aug | Sep | Oct | Nov | Dec | Year |
|---|---|---|---|---|---|---|---|---|---|---|---|---|---|
| Record high °C (°F) | 21.9 (71.4) | 22.8 (73.0) | 31.1 (88.0) | 35.1 (95.2) | 37.2 (99.0) | 39.8 (103.6) | 47.2 (117.0) | 42.1 (107.8) | 42.6 (108.7) | 35.3 (95.5) | 30.8 (87.4) | 26.0 (78.8) | 47.2 (117.0) |
| Mean daily maximum °C (°F) | 6.5 (43.7) | 8.8 (47.8) | 13.8 (56.8) | 19.4 (66.9) | 24.1 (75.4) | 27.6 (81.7) | 30.2 (86.4) | 30.9 (87.6) | 27.4 (81.3) | 21.5 (70.7) | 13.6 (56.5) | 8.0 (46.4) | 19.3 (66.7) |
| Daily mean °C (°F) | 2.1 (35.8) | 3.6 (38.5) | 7.8 (46.0) | 12.6 (54.7) | 16.6 (61.9) | 20.1 (68.2) | 22.9 (73.2) | 23.3 (73.9) | 19.6 (67.3) | 14.6 (58.3) | 7.6 (45.7) | 3.7 (38.7) | 12.9 (55.2) |
| Mean daily minimum °C (°F) | −1.4 (29.5) | −0.6 (30.9) | 2.9 (37.2) | 6.6 (43.9) | 10.3 (50.5) | 13.7 (56.7) | 16.3 (61.3) | 16.7 (62.1) | 13.0 (55.4) | 9.0 (48.2) | 3.0 (37.4) | 0.4 (32.7) | 7.5 (45.5) |
| Record low °C (°F) | −23.4 (−10.1) | −22.1 (−7.8) | −21.2 (−6.2) | −6.3 (20.7) | 0.0 (32.0) | 2.7 (36.9) | 6.1 (43.0) | 6.7 (44.1) | 2.4 (36.3) | −3.2 (26.2) | −11.8 (10.8) | −21.0 (−5.8) | −23.4 (−10.1) |
| Average precipitation mm (inches) | 41.1 (1.62) | 33.8 (1.33) | 45.8 (1.80) | 52.5 (2.07) | 61.7 (2.43) | 40.4 (1.59) | 12.7 (0.50) | 10.1 (0.40) | 18.2 (0.72) | 41.4 (1.63) | 43.1 (1.70) | 42.1 (1.66) | 442.9 (17.44) |
| Average precipitation days | 11.13 | 10.5 | 12.67 | 12.47 | 13.87 | 9.17 | 2.93 | 2.73 | 5.17 | 8.33 | 8.83 | 11.6 | 109.4 |
| Average snowy days | 7.48 | 6.05 | 4.95 | 0.5 | 0 | 0 | 0 | 0 | 0 | 0.14 | 1.09 | 4.23 | 24.44 |
| Average relative humidity (%) | 71 | 65.5 | 60.8 | 58.9 | 62.3 | 61.2 | 57.9 | 58.4 | 59.9 | 65.7 | 71.1 | 73.6 | 63.9 |
| Mean monthly sunshine hours | 81.9 | 103.2 | 140.7 | 184.5 | 223.7 | 233.3 | 266.1 | 280.9 | 243.0 | 180.3 | 126.7 | 75.6 | 2,137.4 |
| Mean daily sunshine hours | 2.7 | 3.7 | 4.6 | 6.1 | 7.2 | 7.8 | 8.4 | 9.1 | 8.2 | 5.6 | 4.0 | 2.5 | 5.9 |
Source 1: Turkish State Meteorological Service
Source 2: NOAA NCEI(humidity, sun 1991-2020), Meteomanz(snowy days, extremes 2021-present)

== Economy ==
Historically, copper was mined in the area. According to Greek researcher, Dimosthenis Oeconomidis (1858–1938):

The town was notorious for its textile industry and its copper manufacturing plants which were reliant on the Kempan Maden mine, a mine which has since been depleted but which in the prior century kept 600 factories in operation.

—

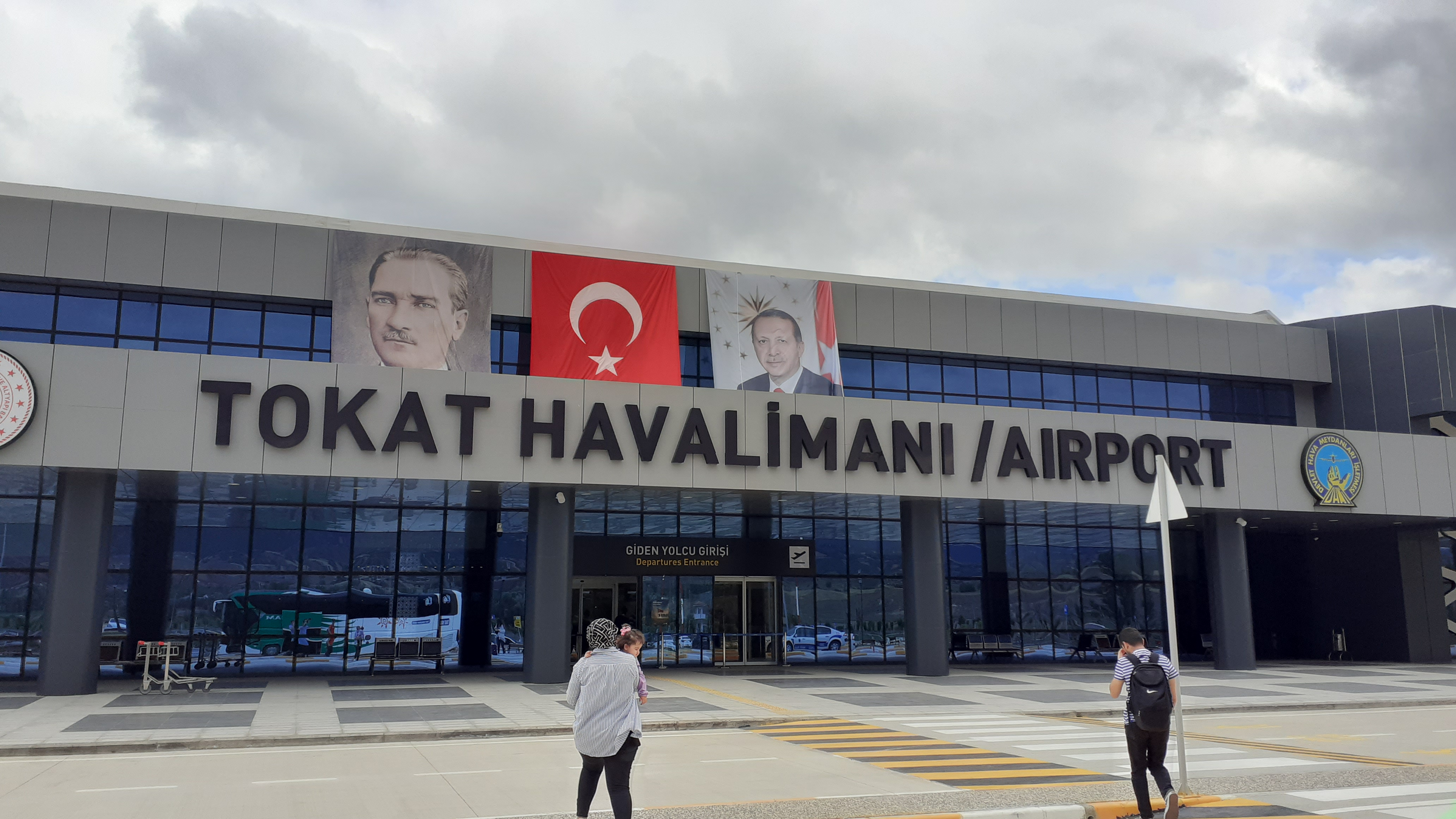
Tokat Airport Terminal

== Culture ==
=== Education ===
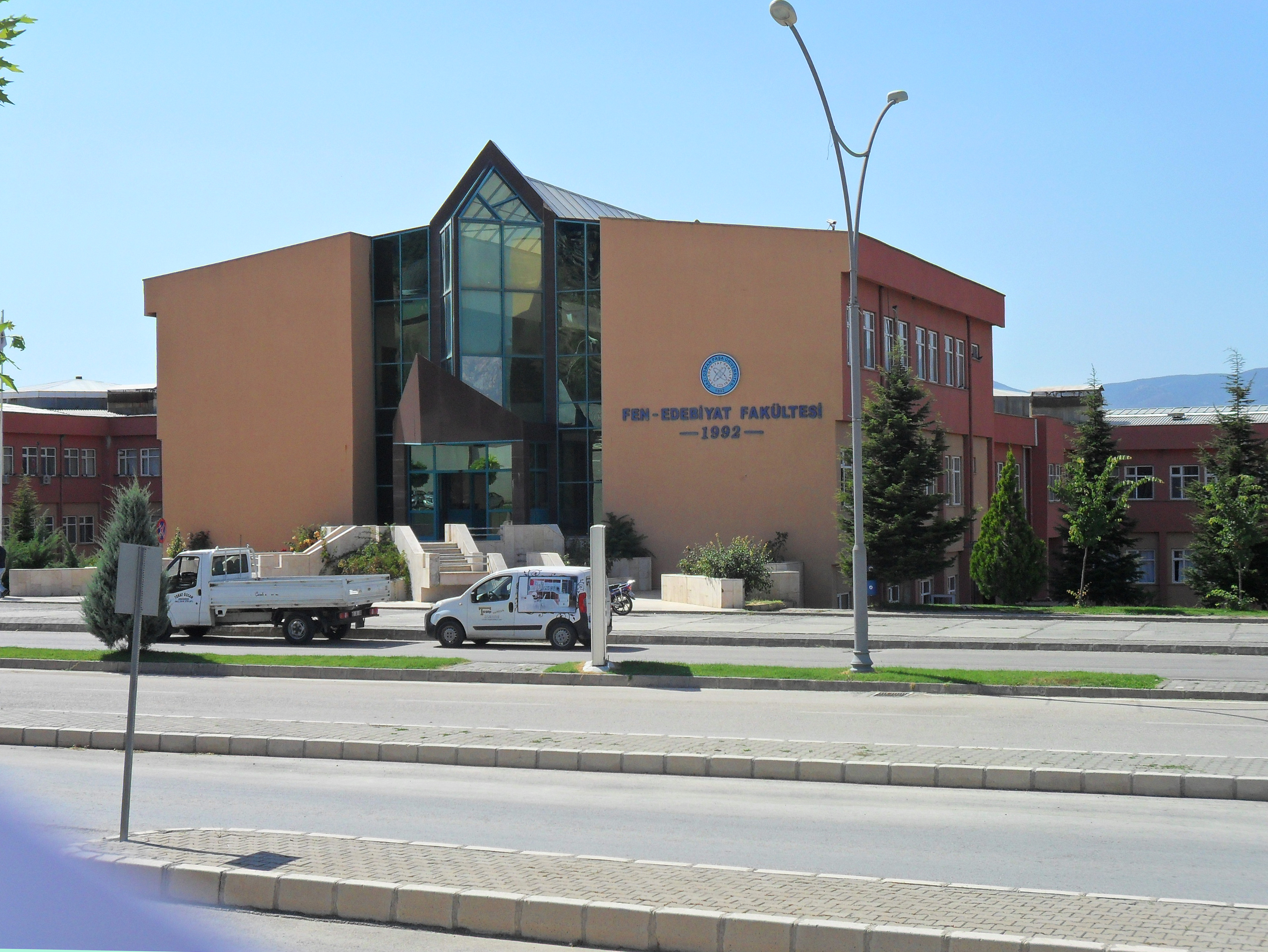
Tokat Gaziosmanpaşa University Faculty of Arts and Sciences building.

Tokat Gaziosmanpaşa University is one of Turkey's newer tertiary institutions, founded in 1992. It was named after the local hero Gazi Osman Paşa.

=== Sports ===
Football is the most popular sport: in the older districts above the city center children often kick balls around in the evenings in the smallest streets. The city's football club is Tokatspor, which plays its games at the Tokat Gaziosmanpaşa Stadium.

Basketball, volleyball, tennis, swimming, cable skiing (in summer), horse riding, go karting, paintballing, martial arts and many other sports are played. Cycling and jogging are only common along the sea front, where recreational fishing is also popular.

=== Cuisine ===
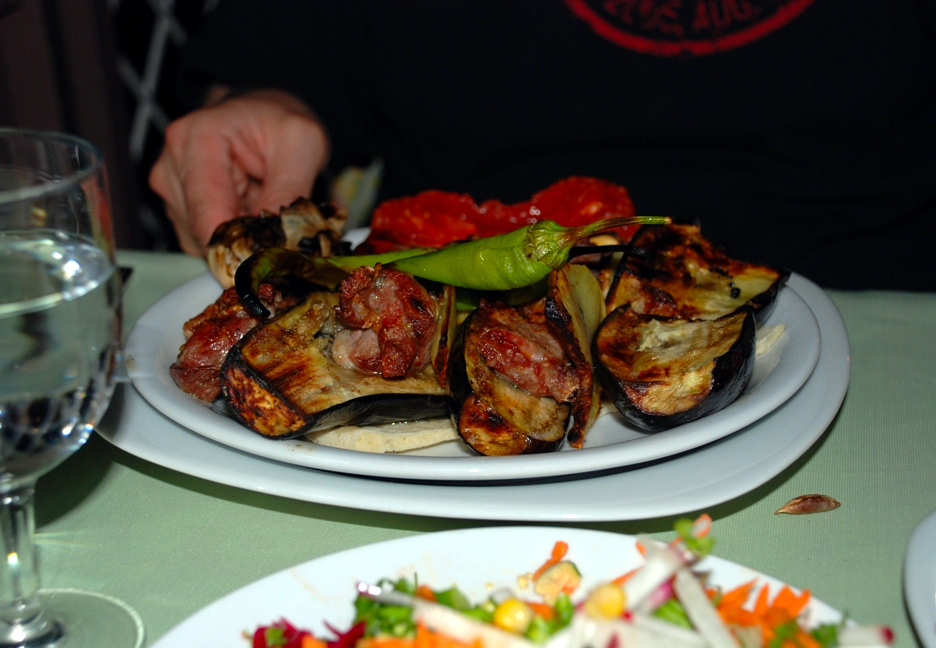
Tokat Kebabı

Foods distinctive to Tokat include Tokat kebabı and Zile pekmezi, the latter being served in a wooden pot. Tokat kebabı consists of sliced lamb, aubergines, potatoes, green bell peppers and tomatoes. The slices are laid on their sides in rows in a dish and baked with cloves of garlic. Zile pekmezi is a grape-molasses confection, prepared from a variety of small green grapes, which are pressed (traditionally by foot but nowadays by machine) and then evaporated to a thick syrup by boiling. Egg-whites are then beaten into the syrup until it forms a pale marshmallow-like paste. It is sold commercially in tubs.

== Tourism ==
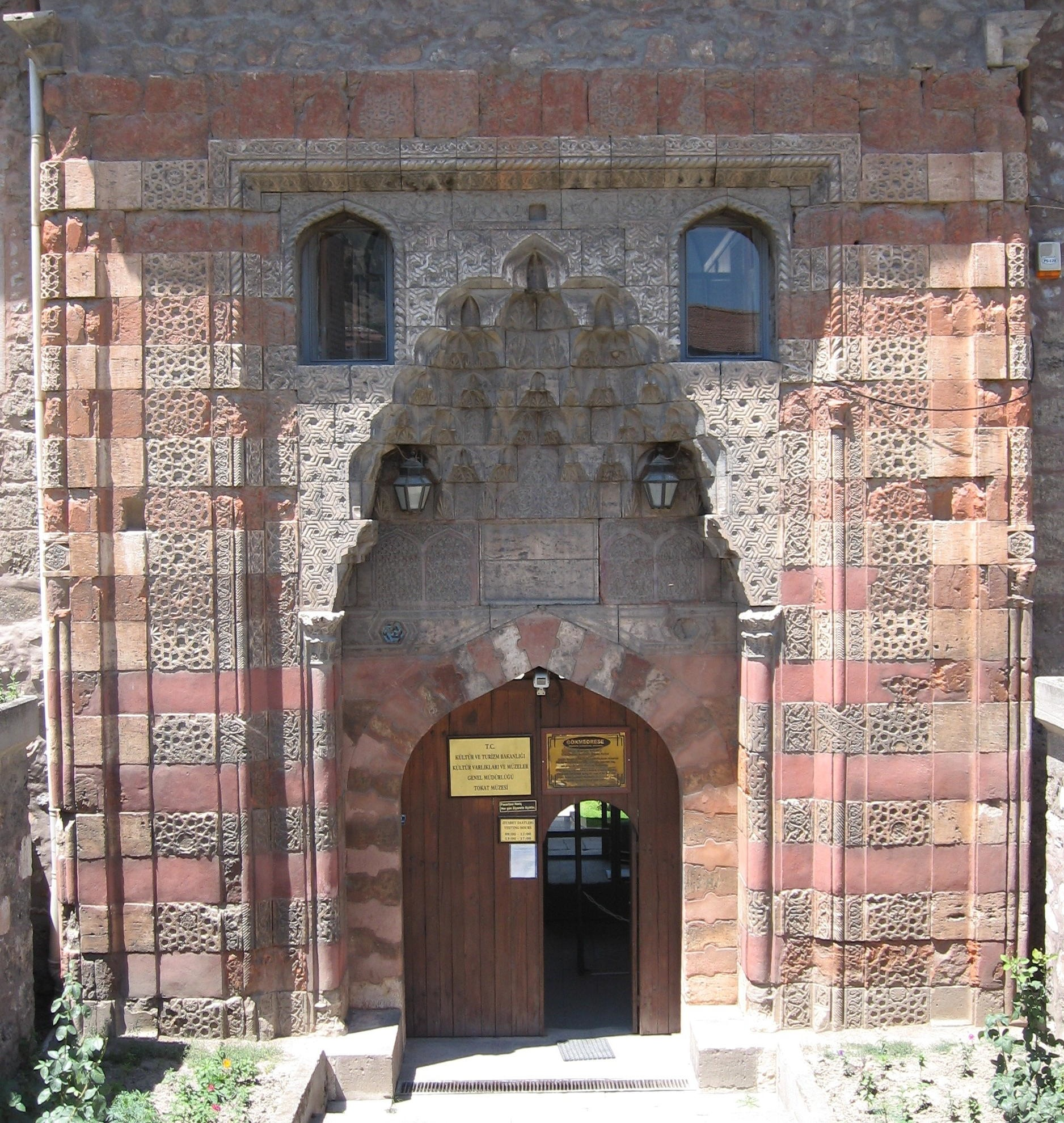
Façade of the Gök Medrese in Tokat, founded by the Pervâne in around 1270.

The most important landmark is Tokat Castle, an Ottoman citadel with 28 towers on a rocky hill overlooking the town. Vlad the Impaler, who may have inspired Bram Stoker's fictional character Count Dracula, was imprisoned in one of its dungeons. Other sights include the remains of several Greek Orthodox churches and a cathedral, the Garipler Mosque dating to the 12th century, the Ali Paşa Mosque (16th century), the Hatuniye Külliyesi, also 16th century and the Gök Medrese (Pervane Bey Darussifasi), which was constructed in 1270. It was founded as a school of theology, and was converted into a museum, housing archaeological finds from the area, until that function was transferred in 2012 to another location.

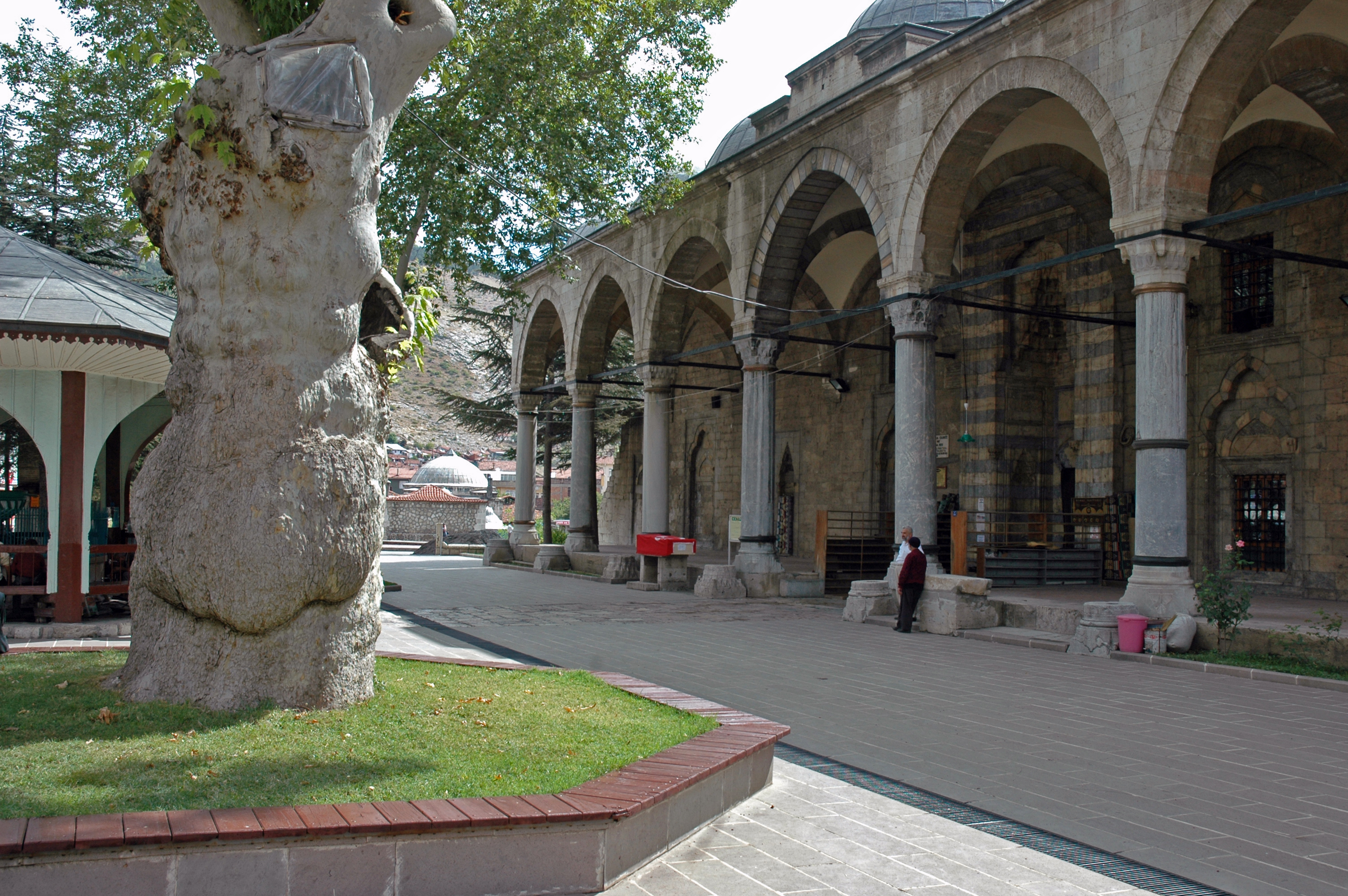
Tokat Ali Pasha Mosque

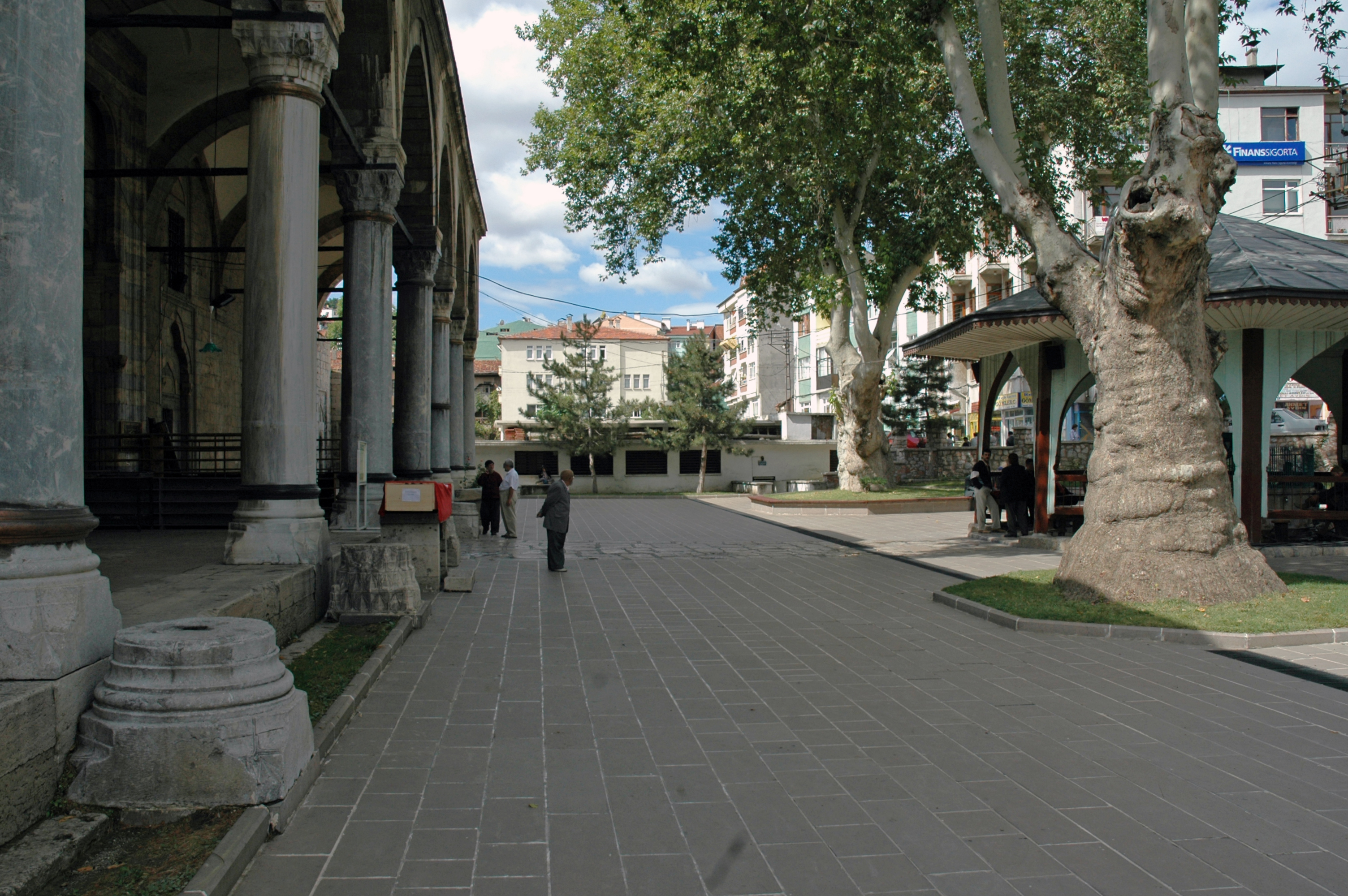
Tokat Ali Pasha Mosque View along side

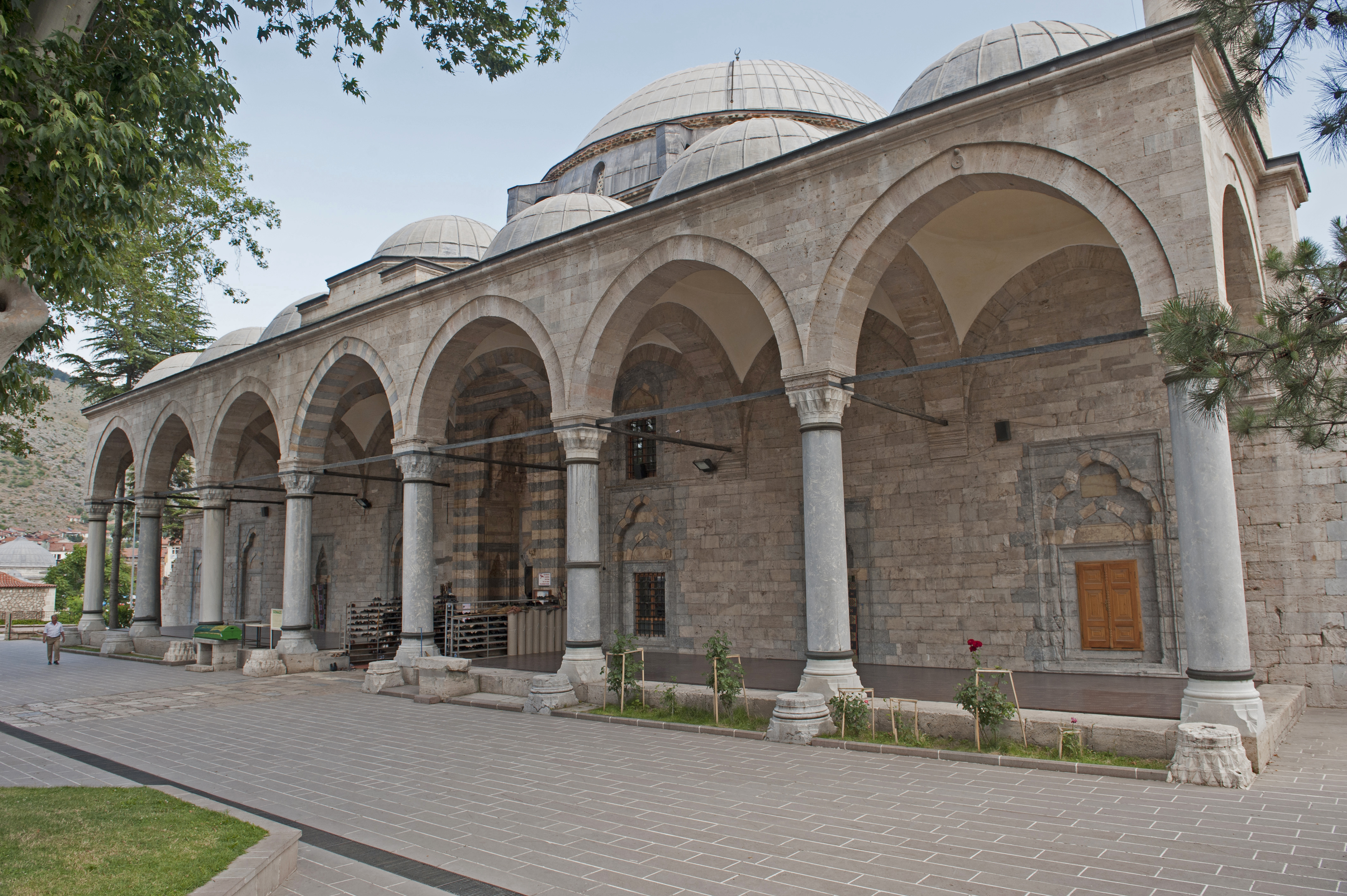
Tokat Ali Pasha Mosque View along side

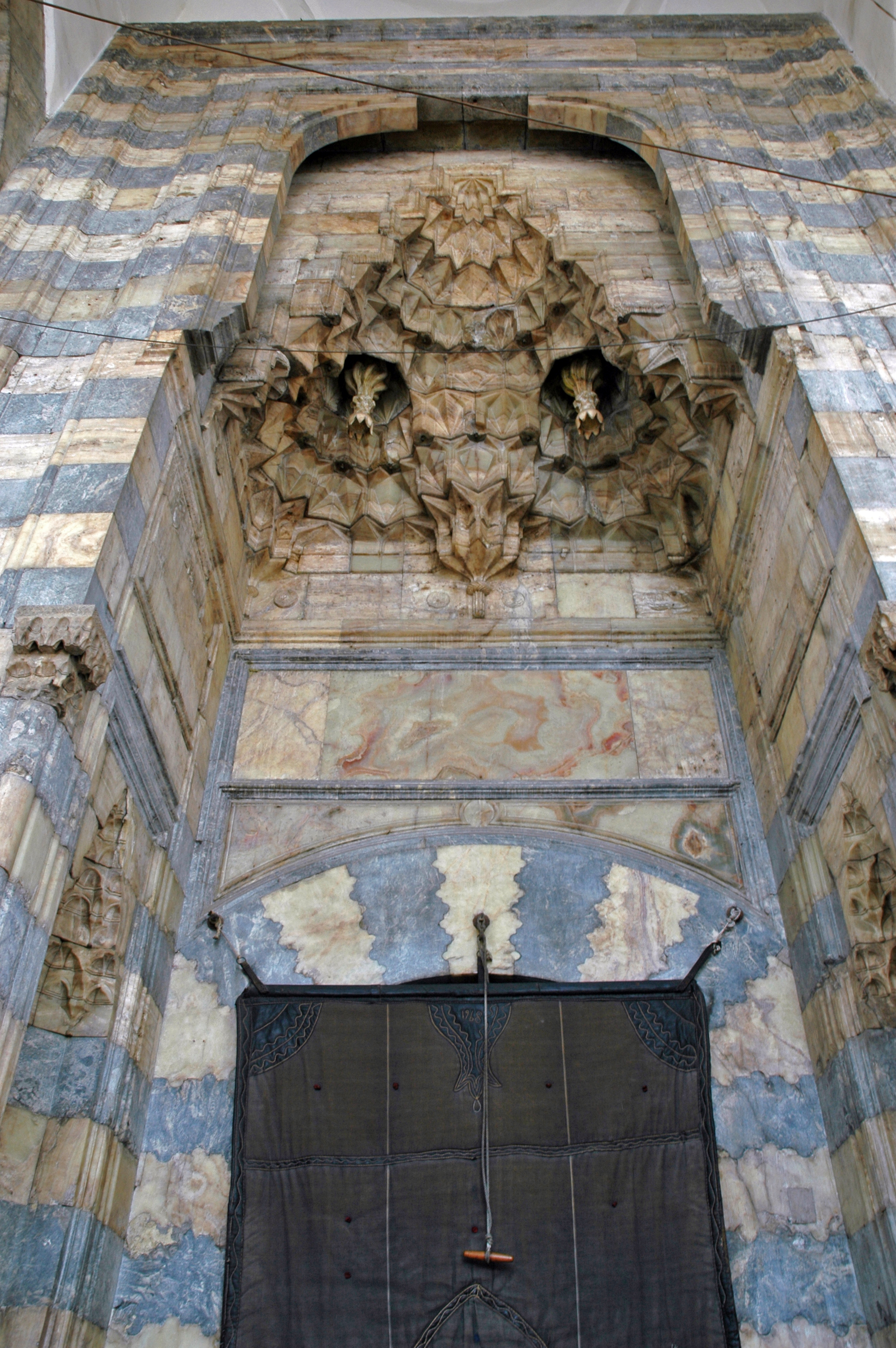
Tokat Ali Pasha Mosque Entrance

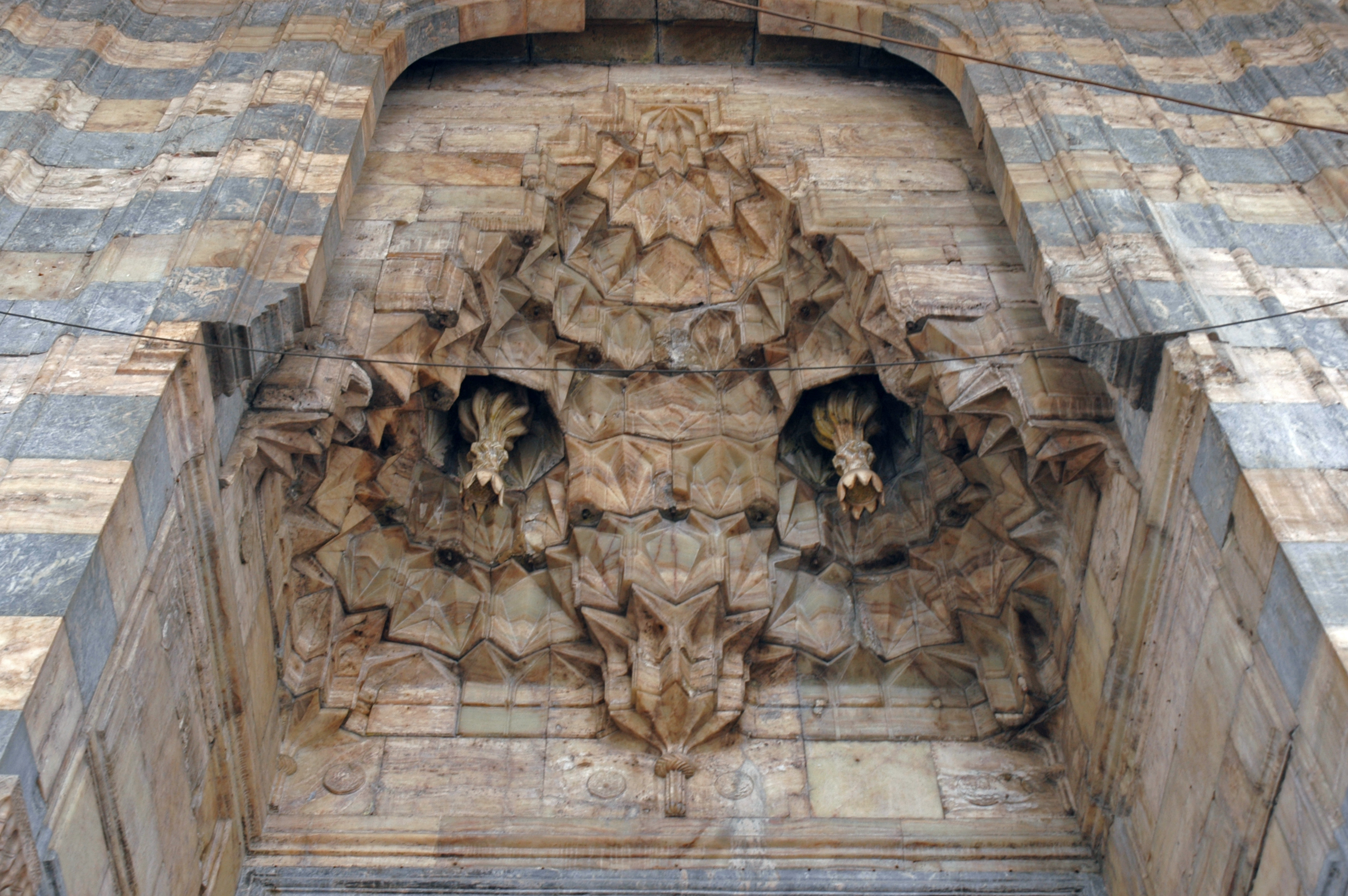
Tokat Ali Pasha Mosque Entrance

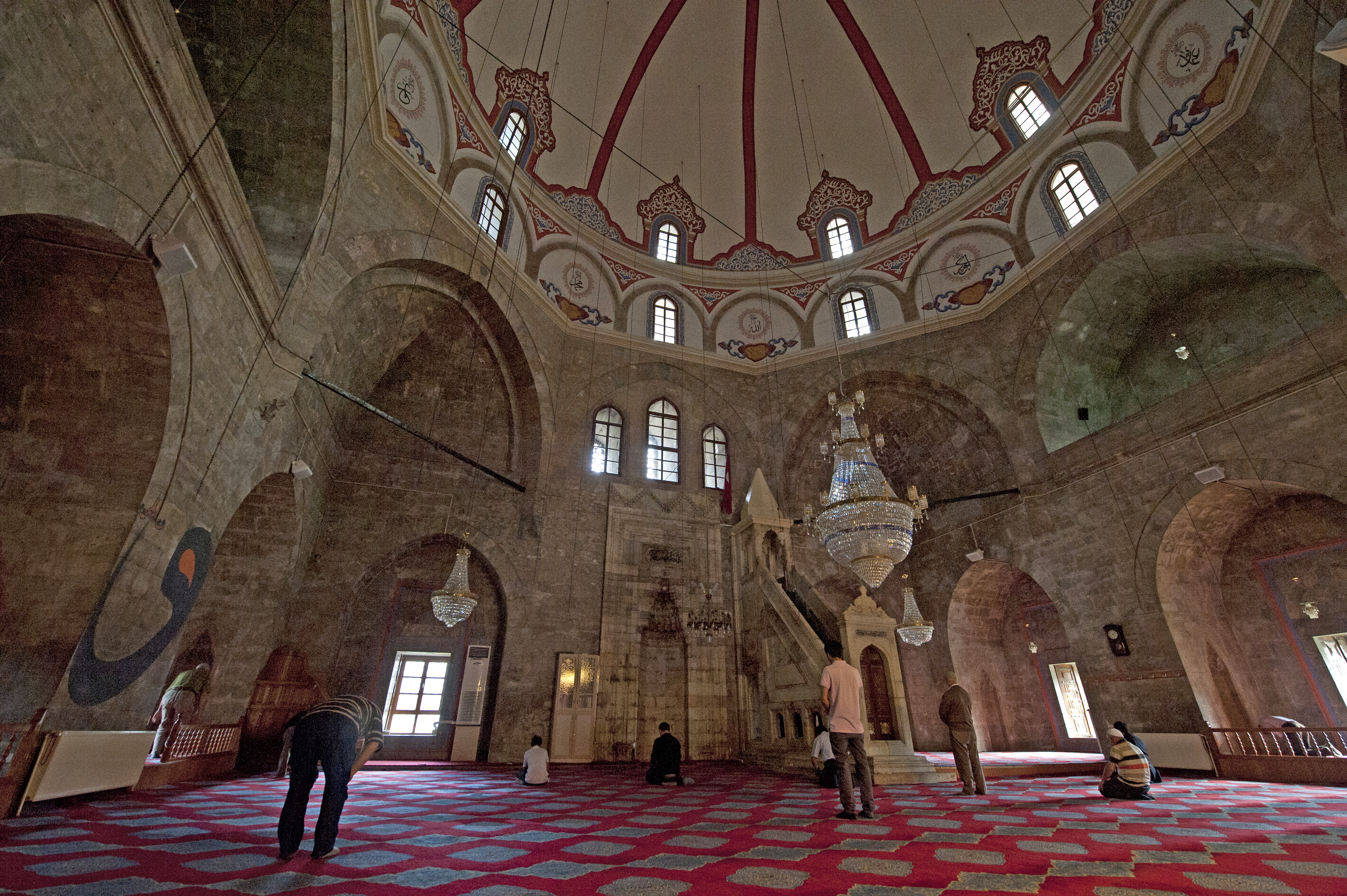
Tokat Ali Pasha Mosque Interior

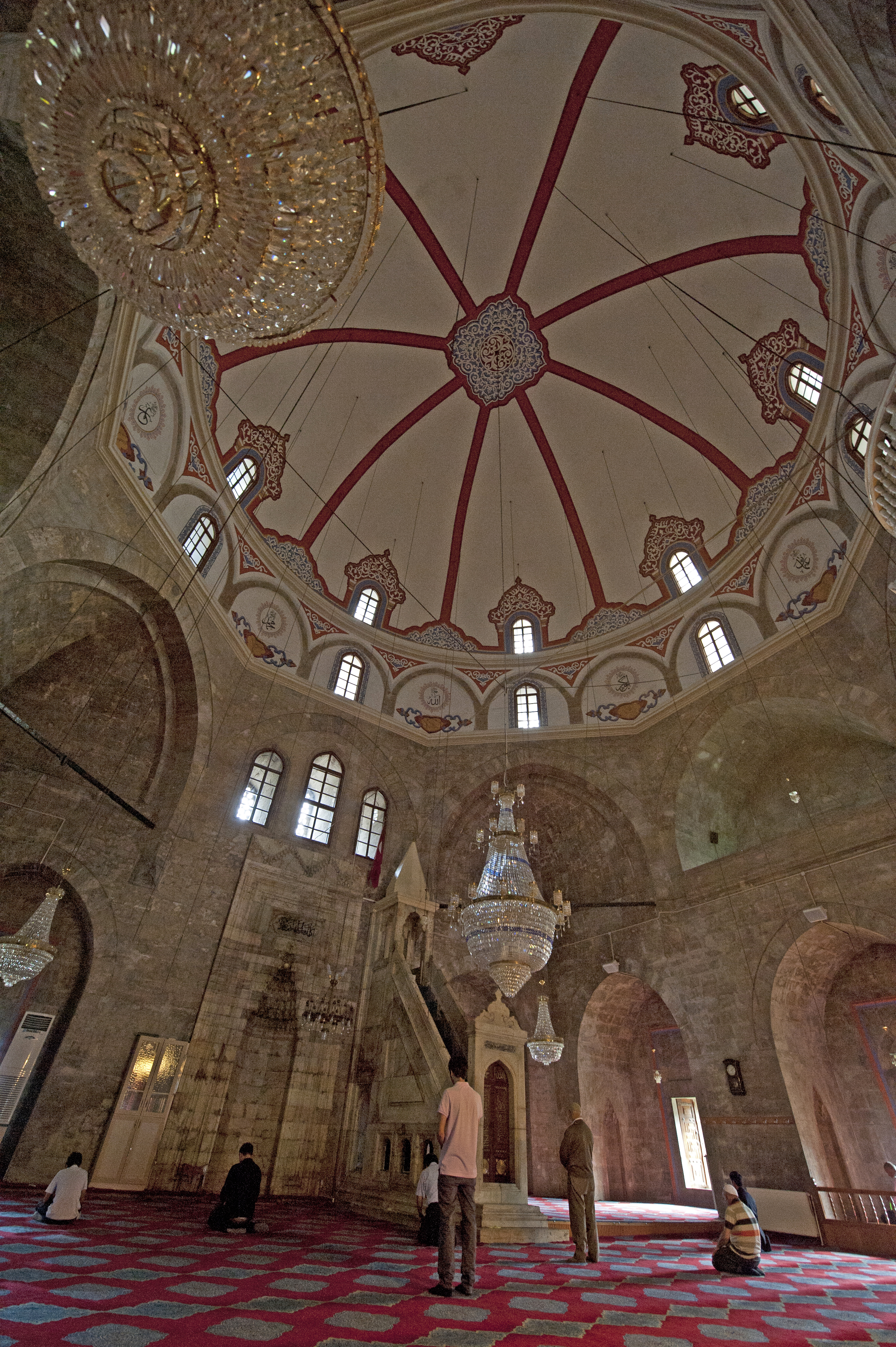
Tokat Ali Pasha Mosque Interior

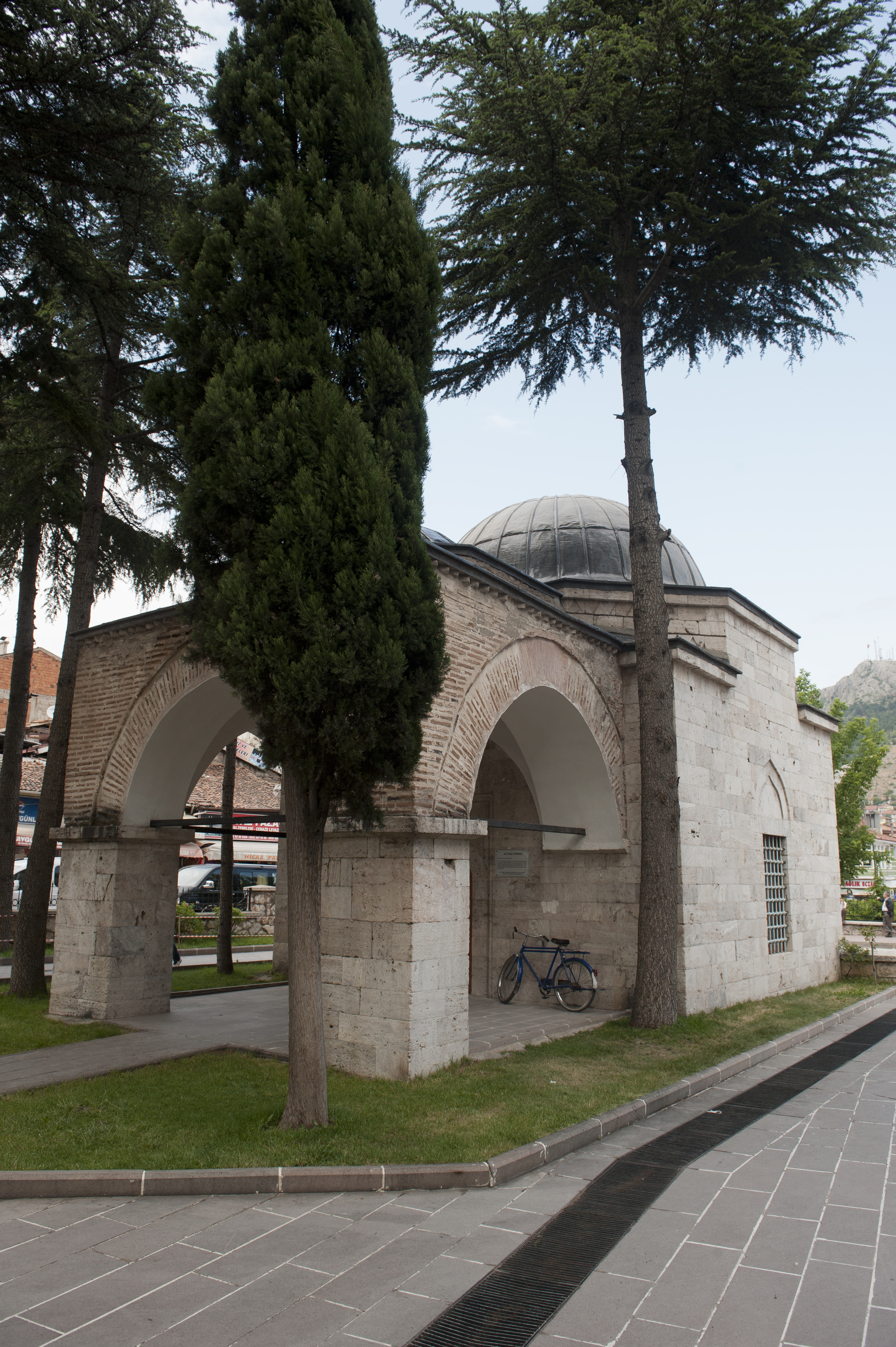
Tokat Ali Pasha Mosque Mausoleum

The Latifoglu Konak, a late 18th-century Ottoman residence, is an example of Baroque architecture. The two-story building has been restored and has been converted into a small museum. Much of the furniture in the kitchen, study, visitors' rooms with bath and toilet, bedroom, master's room, and harem is original.

Ballıca Cave is a small cave situated at 6 km (3.8 mi) southeast of Pazar, Tokat Province.

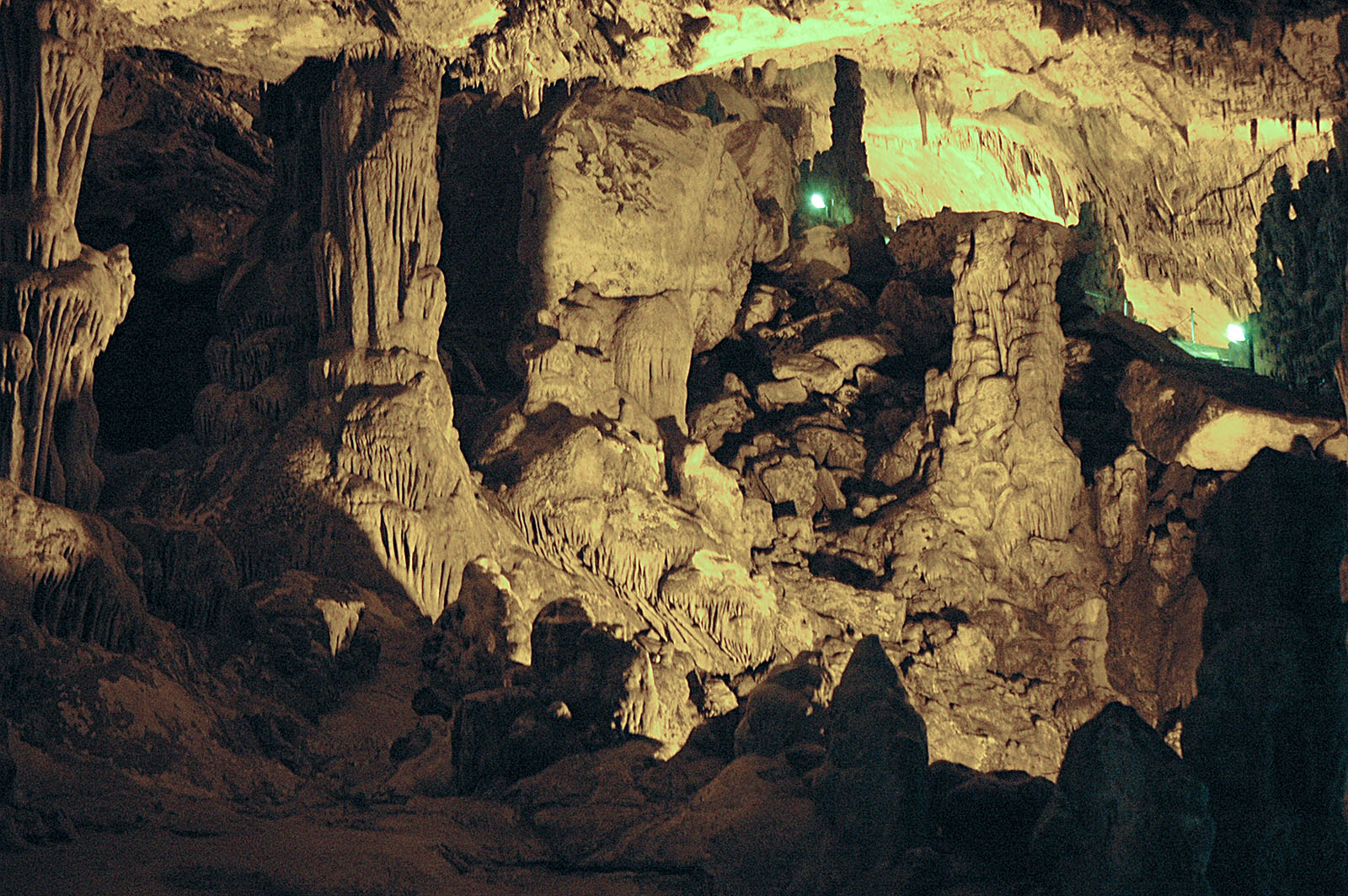
Ballıca Cave Image

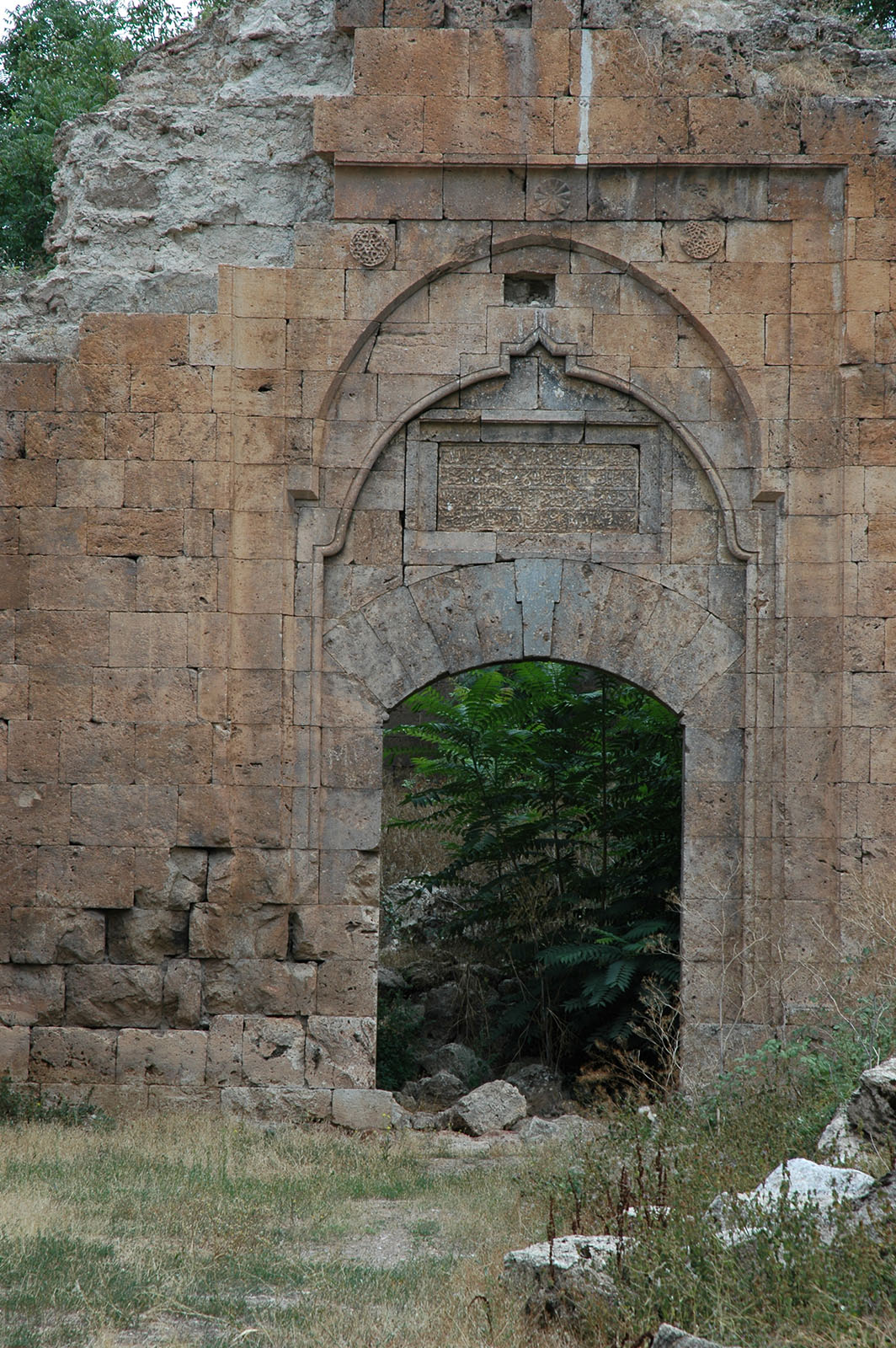
Ballıca Han Door decoration

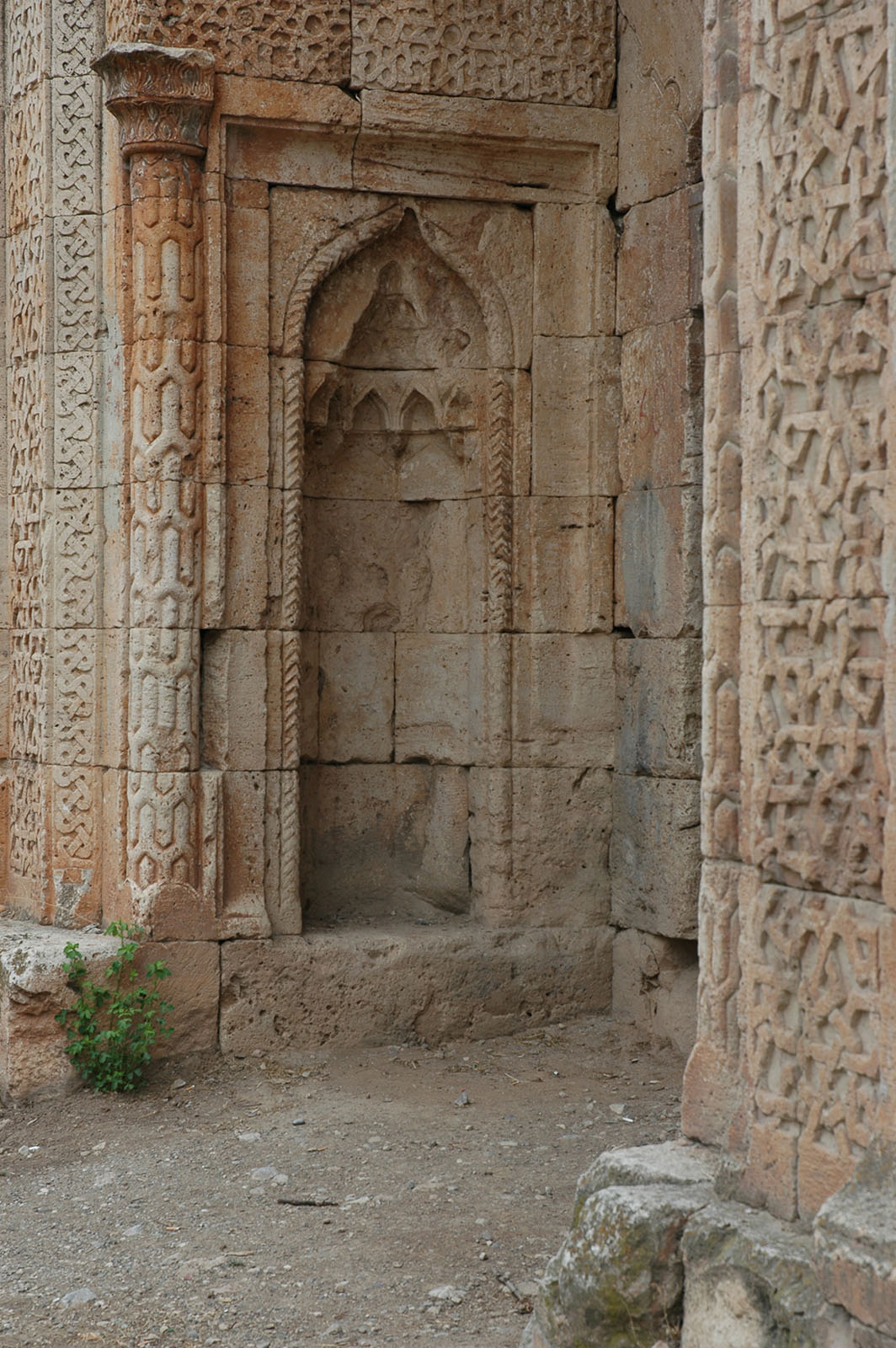
Ballıca Han Decoration at entrance

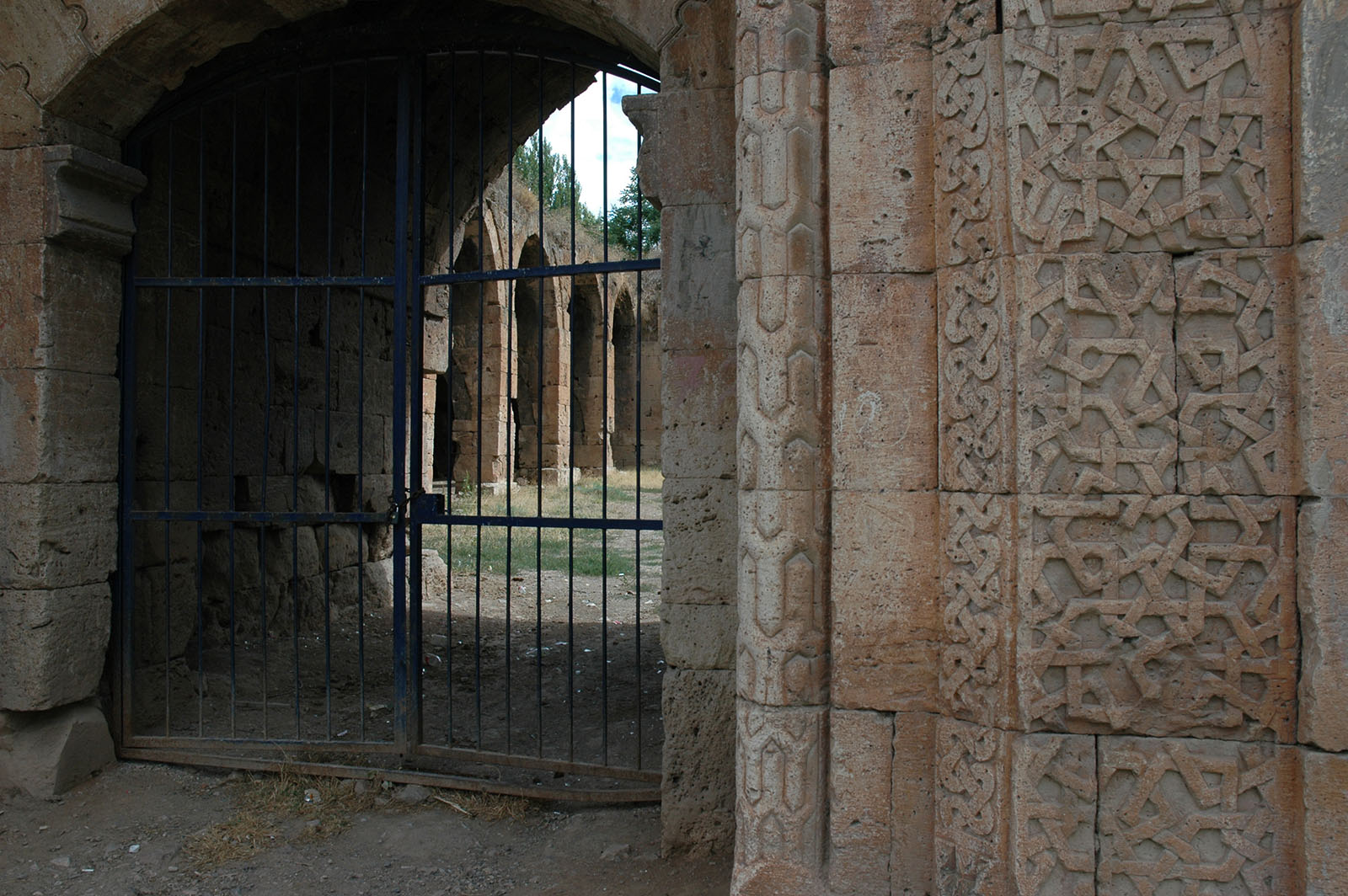
Ballıca Han View into closed courtyard

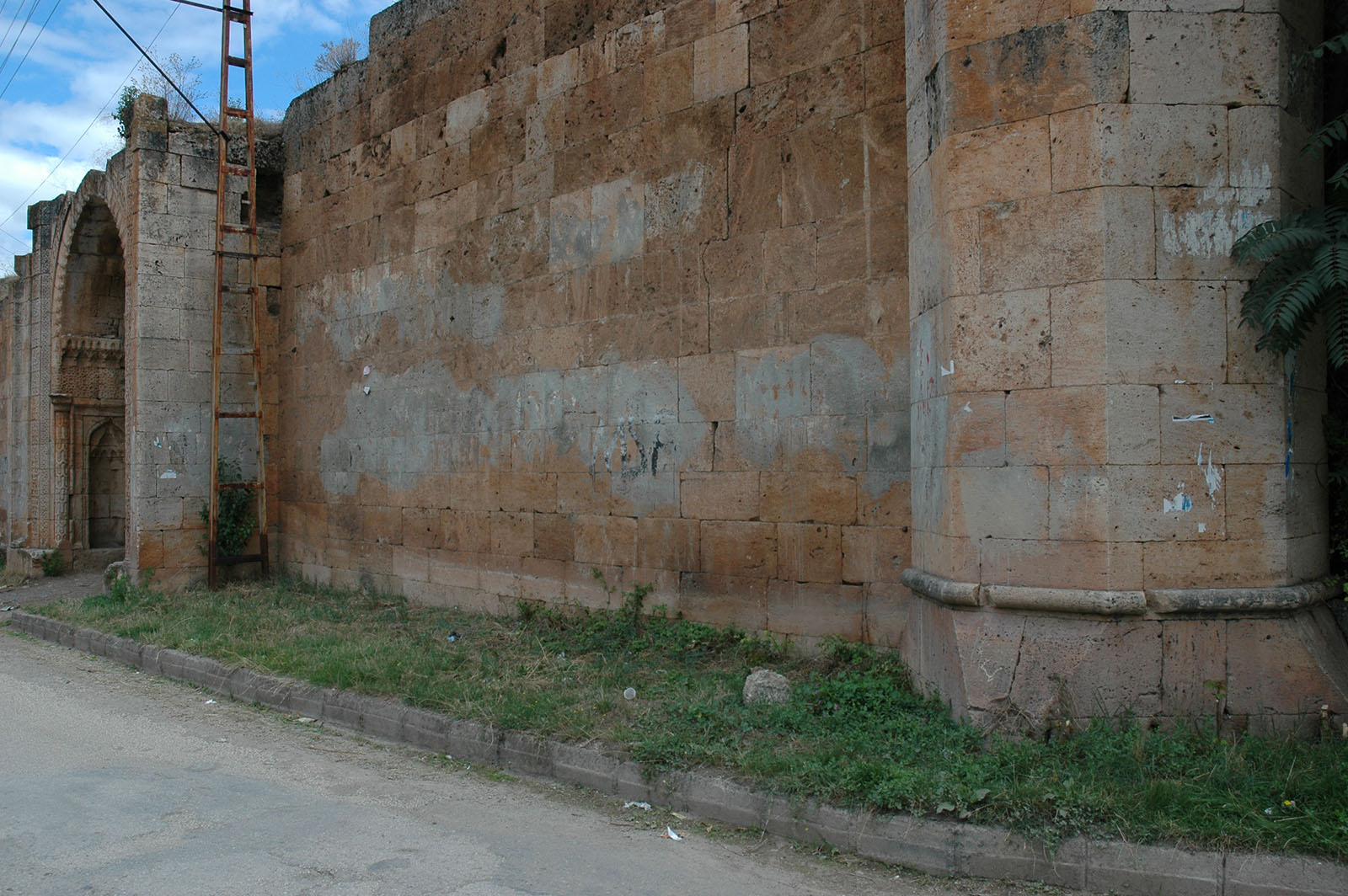
Ballıca Han Exterior wall

Tokat Clock Tower.

== Mayors of Tokat ==
- 1984-1989 Hüdayi Sayıbaş ANAP
- 1989-1994 İsmet Saraçoğlu DYP
- 1994-2004 Nizamettin Aydın Refah Party, Fazilet Partisi, DYP, Saadet Party
- 2004-2014 Adnan Çiçek AK Party
- 2014-2024 Eyüp Eroğlu AK Party
- 2024-present Mehmet Kemal Yazıcıoğlu MHP

== Notable people ==
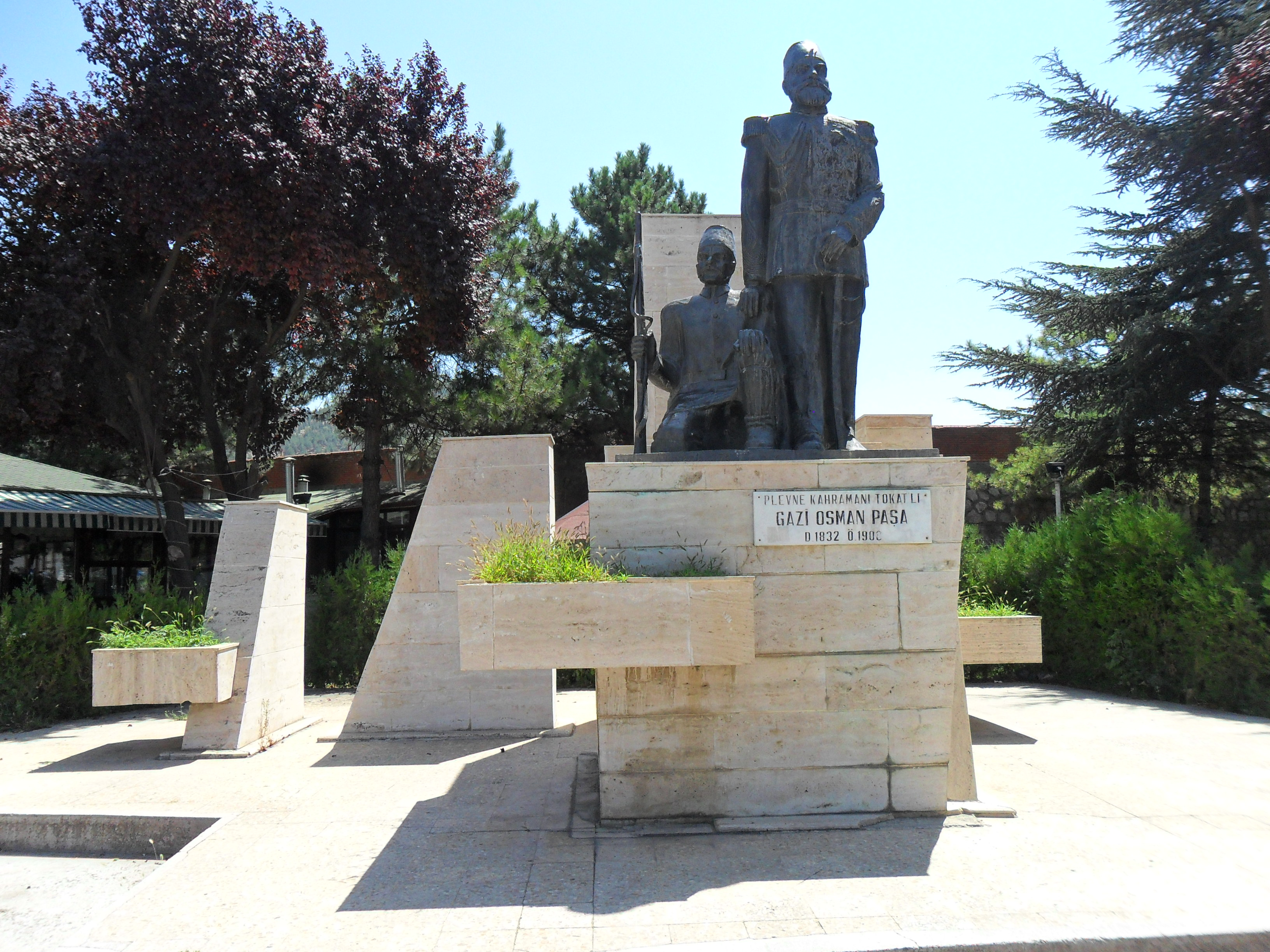
Statue of Gazi Osman Paşa in Tokat

- Apkar Tebir Tokhatetsi (1520?–1572?), Armenian printer and typographer
- Gazi Osman Paşa (1832–1897), Ottoman commander
- Symeon Savvidis (1859–1927), Greek painter
- Mehmet Emin Tokadi Hazretleri (1664–1745), Sufi saint of Istanbul
- Krikor Balakian (1875–1934), Armenian bishop
- Cahit Külebi (1917–1997), Turkish poet
- Engin Günaydın (born 1972), Turkish actor and comedian
- Hüseyin Akbaş (1933–1989), Turkish World and Olympic Champion in wrestling
- Seda Sayan (born 1964), Turkish pop folk singer, actress and TV variety-show hostess
- Aziz Kocaoğlu (born 1948), mayor and politician.

== International relations ==
Tokat is twinned with:

| Europe: North Nicosia, Northern Cyprus; Maglaj, Bosnia and Herzegovina; (Kosovo) Mamuša, Kosova | Africa: Mogadishu, Somalia |

== See also ==
- Tokat Airport
- Tokat (electoral district)
- Tokat Province
- Rûm Eyalet

== Sources and external links ==
- Tokat at kultur.gov.tr
- Tokat web news
