= List of municipalities in Kayseri Province =

This is the List of municipalities in Kayseri Province, Turkey as of October 2007.

== Municipalities ==
List is sorted alphabetically A-Z, as Districts->Municipalities.

District	Municipality
Akkışla	Akkışla
Akkışla	Gömürgen
Akkışla	Kululu
Bünyan	Akmescit
Bünyan	Bünyan
Bünyan	Büyükbürüngüz
Bünyan	Büyüktuzhisar
Bünyan	Elbaşı
Bünyan	Güllüce
Bünyan	Karakaya
Bünyan	Koyunabdal
Bünyan	Yenisüksün
Develi	Develi
Develi	Gazi
Develi	Şıhlı
Develi	Sindelhöyük
Develi	Zile
Felahiye	Büyüktoraman
Felahiye	Felahiye
Felahiye	Kayapınar
Hacılar	Hacılar
İncesu	İncesu
İncesu	Kızılören
İncesu	Süksün
Kocasinan	Amarat
Kocasinan	Düver
Kocasinan	Ebiç
Kocasinan	Erkilet
Kocasinan	Güneşli
Kocasinan	Himmetdede
Kocasinan	Kocasinan
Kocasinan	Kuşcu
Kocasinan	Mahzemin
Kocasinan	Yemliha
Melikgazi	Ağırnas
Melikgazi	Gesi
Melikgazi	Gürpınar
Melikgazi	Hisarcık
Melikgazi	Kıranardı
Melikgazi	Melikgazi
Melikgazi	Mimarsinan
Melikgazi	Turan
Özvatan	Küpeli
Özvatan	Özvatan
Pınarbaşı	Kaynar
Pınarbaşı	Pazarören
Pınarbaşı	Pınarbaşı
Sarıoğlan	Alamettin
Sarıoğlan	Çiftlik
Sarıoğlan	Gaziler
Sarıoğlan	Karaözü
Sarıoğlan	Palas
Sarıoğlan	Sarıoğlan
Sarız	Sarız
Sarız	Yeşilkent
Talas	Başakpınar
Talas	Erciyes
Talas	Kepez
Talas	Kuruköprü
Talas	Talas
Talas	Zincidere
Tomarza	Dadaloğlu
Tomarza	Emiruşağı
Tomarza	Tomarza
Yahyalı	Derebağı
Yahyalı	Yahyalı
Yeşilhisar	Yeşilhisar

== Changes in 2014 ==
According to Law act no 6360, belde (town) municipalities within provinces with more than 750000 population (so called Metropolitan municipalities in Turkey) were abolished as of 30 March 2014. 32 belde municipalities in the above list are now defunct. The list is kept for historical reference.
