= List of prisons in Turkey =

The list of prisons in Turkey is based on official data provided by the Ministry of Justice in Turkey (as of December 2008).

== Prison types ==
Type	Capacity
A	792
A1	508
A2	744
A3	1,731
B	1,068
C	1,696
D	1,732
E	29,753
F	4,966
H	3,225
K1	3,553
K2	1,446
L	15,084
M	9,107
T	3,400

=== Type B, C and D ===
Name/Place, Province	Type	Capacity	Name/Place, Province	Type	Capacity
Ardahan	B	68	Akşehir, Konya	C	280
Çal, Denizli	B	70	Bolvadin, Afyonkarahisar	C	84
Çubuk, Ankara	B	48	Burhaniye, Balıkesir	C	174
Develi, Kayseri	B	66	Kocaeli	C	460
Düzce	B	122	Osmaniye	C	218
Ereğli, Konya	B	86	Salihli, Manisa	C	220
Gönen, Balıkesir	B	64	Tarsus, Mersin	C	260
Haymana, Ankara	B	54	Total Type C		1,696
Iğdır	B	100	Diyarbakır	D	688
Kaman, Kırşehir	B	44	Denizli	D	1,044
Mihalıççık, Eskişehir	B	58	Total Type D		1,732
Reyhanlı, Hatay	B	60			
Seydişehir, Konya	B	60			
Şereflikoçhisar, Ankara	B	44			
Tire, İzmir	B	64			
Yalvaç, Isparta	B	60			
Total Type B		1,068			

=== Type E and F ===
Place	Type	Capacity
Adana	E	1,168
Adıyaman	E	576
Afyonkarahisar	E	600
Amasya	E	550
Antalya	E	1,000
Aydın	E	850
Bitlis	E	592
Burdur	E	514
Bursa	E	1,000
Çanakkale	E	704
Çankırı	E	628
Diyarbakır	E	744
Elazığ	E	468
Elbistan, Elbistan, Kahramanmaraş	E	608
Erzurum	E	700
Gaziantep	E	1,000
Giresun	E	600
Gümüşhane	E	500
Hatay	E	648
Isparta	E	648
Kahramanmaraş	E	696
Kastamonu	E	522
Kırklareli	E	630
Kırşehir	E	516
Konya	E	700
Kütahya	E	508
Malatya	E	590
Manisa	E	544
Mardin	E	580
Mersin	E	854
Muğla	E	728
Muş	E	670
Nazilli	E	668
Nevşehir	E	522
Niğde	E	444
Ordu	E	550
Samsun	E	570
Siirt	E	600
Sinop	E	477
Sivas	E	850
Şanlıurfa	E	600
Trabzon	E	586
Uşak	E	536
Ümraniye, Istanbul	E	1,000
Yozgat	E	714
Total Type E		29,753

Place	Type	Capacity
Adana	F	368
Ankara	F1	368
Ankara	F2	368
Bolu	F	368
Edirne	F	368
İzmir	F1	368
İzmir	F2	368
Kırıkkale	F	368
Kocaeli	F1	368
Kocaeli	F2	368
Tekirdağ	F1	368
Tekirdağ	F2	550
Van	F	368
Total Type F		4,966

=== Type K ===
Name/Place	Type	Capacity	Name/Place	Type	Capacity
Ağlasun, Burdur	K1	42	Arguvan, Malatya	K2	60
Ahlat, Bitlis	K1	42	Ayvalık, Balıkesir	K2	60
Akdağmadeni, Yozgat	K1	42	Bismil, Diyarbakır	K2	60
Alaçam, Samsun	K1	42	Çifteler, Eskişehir	K2	60
Almus, Tokat	K1	42	Çivril, Denizli	K2	60
Altınözü, Hatay	K1	42	Doğanşehir, Malatya	K2	62
Araban, Gaziantep	K1	48	Erdemli, Mersin	K2	60
Araklı, Trabzon	K1	42	Gülnar, Mersin	K2	60
Arhavi, Artvin	K1	42	Horasan, Erzurum	K2	62
Bahçe Tipi	K1	42	İvrindi, Balıkesir	K2	60
Bayramiç, Çanakkale	K1	42	Kale, Denizli	K2	60
Bozcaada, Çanakkale	K1	42	Karahallı, Uşak	K2	60
Bozkurt	K1	42	Karamürsel, Kocaeli	K2	60
Cizre, Şırnak	K1	42	Keban, Elazığ	K2	62
Çameli, Denizli	K1	42	Keçiborlu, Isparta	K2	60
Çerkeş, Çankırı	K1	42	Kırkağaç, Manisa	K2	60
Çerkezköy, Tekirdağ	K1	42	Korgan, Ordu	K2	60
Daday, Kastamonu	K1	42	Kula, Manisa	K2	60
Delice, Kırıkkale	K1	41	Lice, Diyarbakır	K2	60
Derik, Mardin	K1	42	Niksar, Tokat	K2	60
Diyadin, Ağrı	K1	42	Orta, Çankırı	K2	60
Domaniç, Kütahya	K1	42	Selendi, Manisa	K2	60
Durağan, Sinop	K1	42	Şebinkarahisar, Giresun	K2	60
Dursunbey, Balıkesir	K1	84	Torbalı, İzmir	K2	60
Eflani, Karabük	K1	42	Total Type K2		1,446
Eşme, Uşak	K1	42			
Felahiye, Kayseri	K1	42			
Gediz, Kütahya	K1	42			
Gölbaşı, Adıyaman	K1	42			
Gölhisar, Burdur	K1	42			
Göynük, Bolu	K1	54			
Güdül, Ankara	K1	42			
Gürpınar, Van	K1	42			
Halfeti, Şanlıurfa	K1	42			
Havran, Balıkesir	K1	42			
Hazro, Diyarbakır	K1	42			
Hendek, Sakarya	K1	42			
Hilvan, Şanlıurfa	K1	42			
İpsala, Edirne	K1	42			
Kalecik, Ankara	K1	42			
Karacasu, Aydın	K1	42			
Karaisali, Adana	K1	42			
Karakoçan, Elazığ	K1	42			
Karşıyaka, İzmir	K1	42			
Kaş, Antalya	K1	42			
Keles, Bursa	K1	42			
Kıbrıscık, Blu	K1	42			
Kınık, İzmir	K1	42			
Kızıltepe, Mardin	K1	42			
Kumluca, Antalya	K1	42			
Mengen, Bolu	K1	42			
Of, Trabzon	K1	42			
Ovacık	K1	42			
Pazaryeri, Bilecik	K1	46			
Pınarhisar, Kırklareli	K1	42			
Saimbeyli, Adana	K1	42			
Samandağ, Hatay	K1	42			
Saray, Tekirdağ	K1	42			
Sarıgöl, Manisa	K1	44			
Sarıkaya, Yozgat	K1	42			
Sarıoğlan, Kayseri	K1	42			
Sarız, Kayseri	K1	42			
Selim, Kars	K1	42			
Silopi, Şırnak	K1	42			
Silvan, Diyarbakır	K1	42			
Söğüt, Bilecik	K1	42			
Sulakyurt, Kırıkkale	K1	44			
Susuz, Kars	K1	42			
Şabanözü, Çankırı	K1	42			
Şarköy, Tekirdağ	K1	42			
Şefaatli, Yozgat	K1	44			
Tomarza, Kayseri	K1	42			
Tufanbeyli, Adana	K1	42			
Ulubey, Uşak	K1	42			
Urla, İzmir	K1	42			
Uzunköprü, Edirne	K1	42			
Vize, Kırklareli	K1	42			
Yahyalı, Kayseri	K1	42			
Yayladağı, Hatay	K1	40			
Yenipazar, Aydın	K1	42			
Yenişehir, Bursa	K1	42			
Yeşilhisar, Kayseri	K1	42			
Yumurtalık, Adana	K1	42			
Total Type K1		3,553			

=== Type L and M ===
Province	Place	Type	Capacity
Ankara	Ankara	L	1,000
Ankara	Ankara	L	1,000
Antalya	Alanya	L	1,000
Antalya	Antalya	L	1,000
Çorum	Çorum	L	1,000
Istanbul	Maltepe	L1	1,000
Istanbul	Maltepe	L2	1,000
Istanbul	Maltepe	L3	1,000
Istanbul	Silivri	L3	1,000
Istanbul	Silivri	L4	1,000
Istanbul	Silivri	L5	1,000
Istanbul	Silivri	L6	1,000
Istanbul	Silivri	L7	1,000
Istanbul	Silivri	L8	1,000
Rize	Rize	L	386
Sakarya	Adapazarı	L	698
Total Type L			15,084

Province	Place	Type	Capacity
Adana	Ceyhan	M	466
Adana	Kozan	M	395
Adana	Pozantı	M	282
Amasya	Zile	M	394
Ağrı	Ağrı	M	312
Balıkesir	Bandırma	M	468
Batman	Batman	M	362
Bayburt	Bayburt	M	294
Bilecik	Bilecik	M	416
Bingöl	Bingöl	M	332
Hatay	İskenderun	M	430
İzmir	Bergama	M	330
İzmir	Ödemiş	M	400
Karaman	Ermenek	M	300
Karaman	Karaman	M	324
Kastamonu	İnebolu	M	406
Kocaeli	Gebze	M	354
Manisa	Alaşehir	M	470
Mardin	Midyat	M	348
Mersin	Silifke	M	404
Ordu	Ünye	M	362
Samsun	Vezirköprü	M	398
Van	Van	M	500
Zonguldak	Zonguldak	M	360
Total Type M		9,107	

=== Type H and T ===
Name/Place	Type	Capacity	Name/Place	Type	Capacity
Bursa	H	740	Bakırköy Metris 1	T	1,000
Erzurum	H	740	Bakırköy Metris 2	T	1,000
Eskişehir	H	624	Ümraniye	T	1,000
Gaziantep	H	511	Erzurum/Oltu	T	400
Kartal	H	610	Total Type T		3,400
Total Type H		3,225			

== Closed and open prisons ==
Name/Place	Type	Capacity	Name/Place	Type	Capacity
Aksaray	closed	228	Adıyaman	open (independent)	300
Artvin	closed	120	Afyonkarahisar	open (independent)	192
Balıkesir	closed	274	Ankara	open (independent)	310
Bartın	closed	356	Ayaş	open (independent)	300
Bolu	closed	148	Bozüyük	open (independent)	160
Boyabat	closed	60	Ceyhan	open (independent)	200
Dinar	closed	80	Çanakkale	open (independent)	300
Edirne	closed	500	Dalaman	open (independent)	280
Elmadağ	closed	70	Edirne	open (independent)	240
Erzincan	closed	150	Erciş	open (independent)	260
Gerede	closed	30	Erzurum	open (independent)	210
Hakkâri	closed	192	Eskipazar	open (independent)	100
İmralı prison	closed	1	Eskişehir	open (independent)	250
İzmir	closed	2031	Foça, İzmir	open (independent)	350
Kars	closed	200	Gemlik	open (independent)	182
Kayseri	closed	700	İskilip	open (independent)	142
Keskin	closed	125	Kalecik	open (independent)	70
Milas	closed	70	Kırıkhan	open (independent)	100
Mudurnu	closed	32	Kırşehir	open (independent)	300
Paşakapısı	closed	350	Konya	open (independent)	160
Şırnak	closed	32	Maltepe, Istanbul	open (independent)	444
Tekirdağ	closed	320	Niğde	open (independent)	300
Tokat	closed	208	Sarayköy	open (independent)	80
			Siirt	open (independent)	250
			Sincan	open (independent)	240
			Sivas	open (independent)	235
			Silivri, Istanbul	open (independent)	400
			Pınarbaşı	open (independent)	50
			Anamur	hired	30
Sum		6277	Sum		6,435

== Women, children and juveniles ==
Name/Place	Type	Capacity
Karataş	Women (closed)	144
Ankara	Women (closed)	352
Bakırköy, Istanbul	Women (closed)	912
Denizli	Women (open)	350
Ankara	Children and Juveniles	324
Maltepe, Istanbul	Children and Juveniles	950
İncesu	Children (closed)	60
Ankara	Educational Centre	108
Elazığ	Educational Centre	120
İzmir	Educational Centre	132
Sum		3,452

== Explanatory note ==
The lists were created using a table of the General Directorate for Penal and Arrest Centres (Adalet Bakanlığı Ceza ve Tevkifevleri Genel Müdürlüğü) as part of the Ministry of Justice in Turkey. The lists can be downloaded as an excel-file. It reflects the situation as of 1 December 2008. For the locations neither the districts nor the provinces were mentioned. In addition the General Directorate for Penal and Arrest Centres presents a total of 384 prisons (omitting prisons that have no separate administration) having a total capacity to accommodate 98,238 prisoners.

== See also ==
- Prisons in Turkey
