= Bayramhacı Dam =

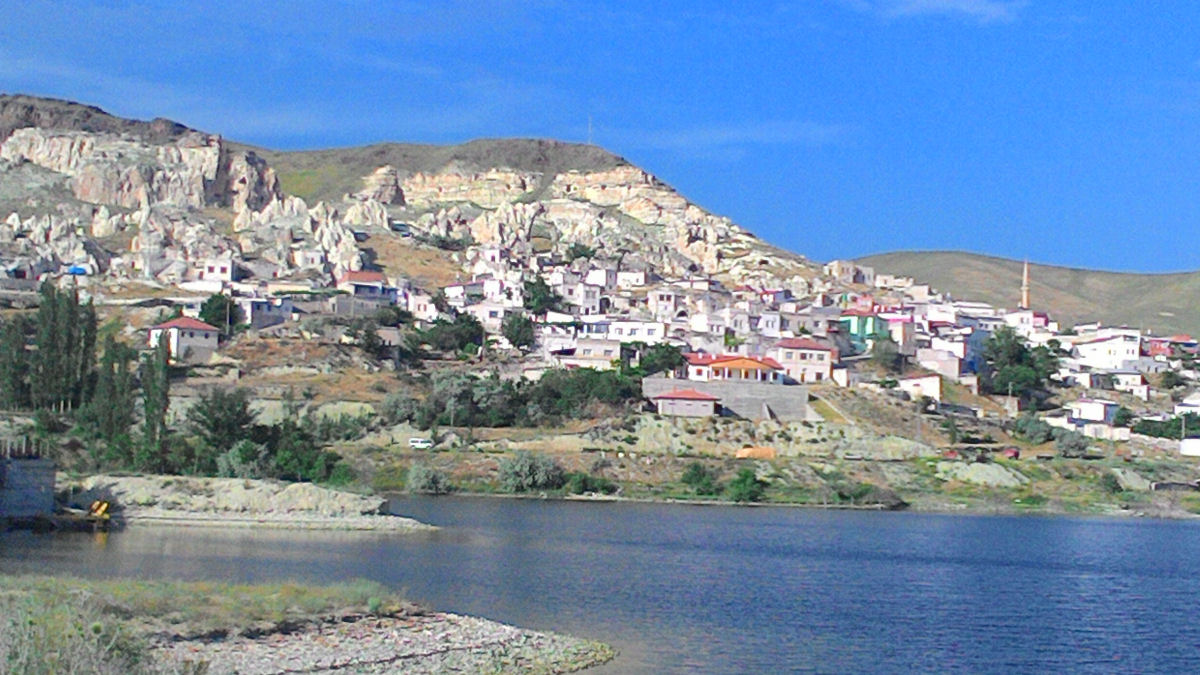

- Location within Turkey
- Official name: Bayramhacılı Barajı
- Location: Kocasinan, Kayseri Province, Turkey
- Coordinates: 38°47′57.6″N 34°59′50.0″E
- Owner: Turkish State Hydraulic Works

Dam and spillways
- Type of dam: High embankment
- Impounds: Kızılırmak River

Reservoir
- Creates: Bayramhacılı Reservoir

Power Station
- Type: Conventional
- Website www.senerji.com.tr (in Turkish)

Bayramhacı Dam is a dam and hydroelectric plant in Kayseri Province on Kızılırmak River, central Turkey.

== Information ==
Construction on the Bayramhac dam began in 2008, and it was finished on October 18, 2010. Its old village was submerged underneath the dam. It is located close to the attractions of Soğanlı Valley, and Tekgöz Bridge.
