= Gülçin (name) =

Gülçin is a Turkish feminine given name that means "rose collector" and "rosy color". Notable people with the name include:

- Gülçin Ergül, Turkish singer
- Gülçin Yahya Kaçar, Turkish musician
- Gülçin Santırcıoğlu, Turkish actress
