= Archalla =

Town of ancient Cappadocia

Coordinates: 38°50′04″N 35°17′43″E

Archalla (Greek: Άρχαλλα) was a town of ancient Cappadocia, inhabited during Roman times.

Its site is tentatively located near Erkilet(Under Kocasinan), Asiatic Turkey. Although only attested in ancient times, it was presumably inhabited continuously through Byzantine times and into the present day, since its name is preserved in the current name Erkilet. The façade of the extant Mehmed Paşa Camii mosque in Erkilet is built partly using ancient remains as spolia.
