= Tekgöz Bridge =

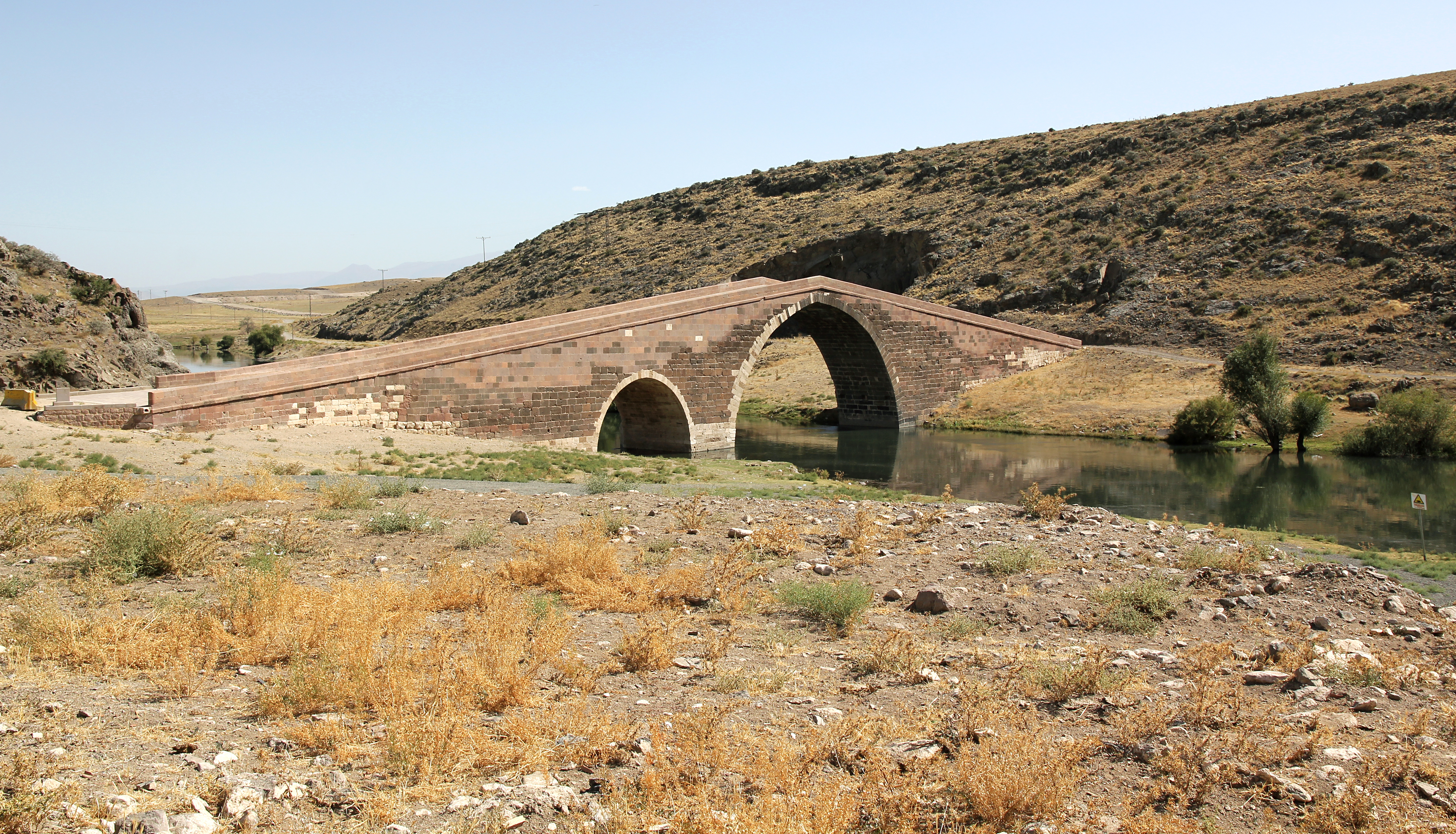
- Coordinates: 38°50′10″N 35°10′44″E
- Crosses: Kızılırmak River
- Locale: Near Beydeğirmeni, Kocasinan, Kayseri Province, Central Anatolia Region, Turkey

Characteristics
- Design: Pointed arch bridge
- Material: Stone
- No. of spans: 1

Location
- Interactive map of Tekgöz Bridge

Tekgöz Bridge is a historic bridge in Turkey over the Kızılırmak River (the Halys of antiquity), located in Kayseri Province about 30 kilometres (19 mi) northwest of Kayseri city, at 38°50′10″N 35°10′44″E. Its elevation with respect to sea level is 980 metres (3,220 ft).

According to an inscription on the bridge's stonework, it was commissioned by a certain Hacı Alişir from Kayseri in behalf of Süleyman II (1196–1204), the sultan of Seljuks of Anatolia in 1203.

The bridge has a single main arch, which is the origin of the Turkish name, Tekgöz, meaning "single eye" or "single opening". The bridge also has a smaller auxiliary arch used only in overflow seasons. The total length of the stone bridge is 120 metres (390 ft). The main arch has a span of 27 metres (89 ft) and is 18 metres (59 ft) tall. The span of the auxiliary arch is 11.26 metres (36.9 ft) and it is 7.5 metres (25 ft) tall.

== A misconception ==
Evliya Çelebi, the famous Turkish traveller of the 17th century, read the bridge's inscription during his travels through the area; seeing the name Süleyman he incorrectly ascribed the construction to Süleyman the Magnificent, the 16th century sultan of the Ottoman Empire.
