= Gülçin Yahya Kaçar =

Turkish musician and academic (born 1966)

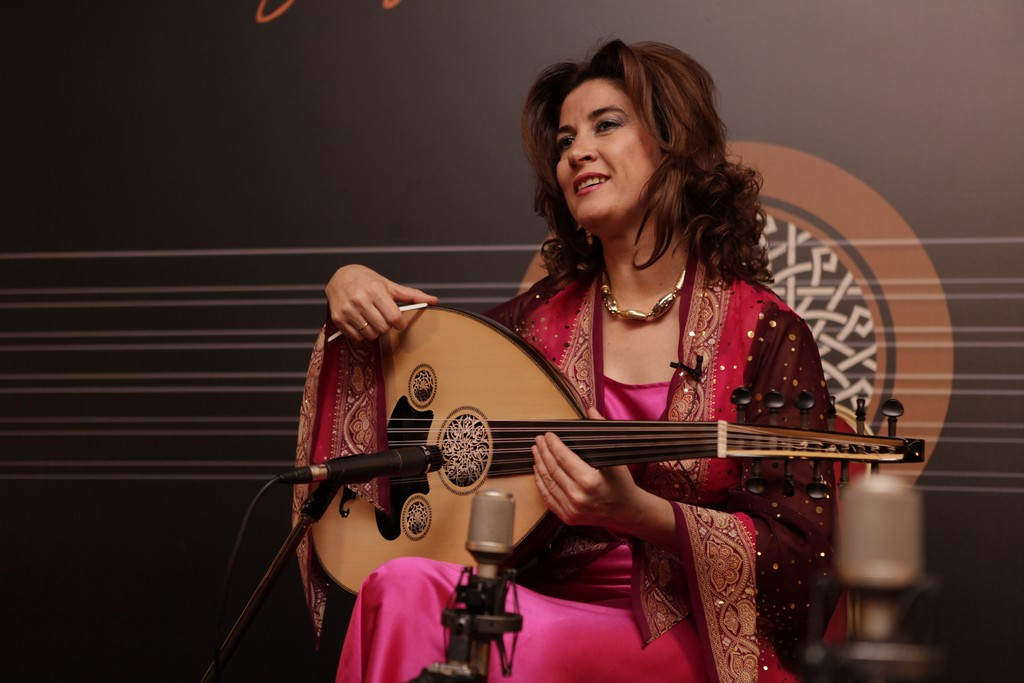
- Born: 10 January 1966 (age 60); Ankara, Turkey
- Education: Gazi University
- Occupations: Musician; Oud master; composer; Singer; academician
- Musical career
- Genre: Turkish classical music
- Years active: 1988–present

Gulçin Yahya Kaçar (10 January 1966) is a Turkish musician, Oud master, composer, singer, and academic. Member of the Republic of Turkey Presidential Culture and Art Policies Board.

== Biography ==
Gülçin Yahya Kaçar was born in Ankara in 1966 as the daughter of Dalyan Yahya, member of foreign affairs officer and housewife Arife Yahya. Her great-grandfather was from Kastoria, district of Bitola in the past. The nickname of Yahya family in Manastır is Karaman. The family of Hammamizade İsmail Dede Efendi, famous composer of Turkish Music, moved from Kastoria to Istanbul as well. Yahya family came to Turkey due to population exchange in 1923 and settled first in İzmir-Urla, then Mersin, after that Çukur town connected to Kayseri-Felahiye (now called Özvatan). Parents of Gülçin Yahya Kaçar were born in Kayseri-Çukur. Gülçin Yahya Kaçar became interested in music by taking private lessons on her talent recognized by her family in childhood. After graduating from Çankaya High School, in the same year she won Music Department of Gazi University. She studied flute with Aycan Sancar, group conductor of Presidential Symphony Orchestra, here. In addition to Western Music education, she started to interested in Turkish Classical Music and oud. In 1986, she became the student of Cinuçen Tanrıkorur who is an oud virtuoso, composer and architect. She gave the first recital with him after finishing oud method of Tanrıkorur in six months, which was a very short time.

She speaks English. She is married with police manager, historian, poet and writer Izzet Kacar and has two children named Emirhan Ahmet (2003) and Mehmet Yekta (2005).

== Career ==
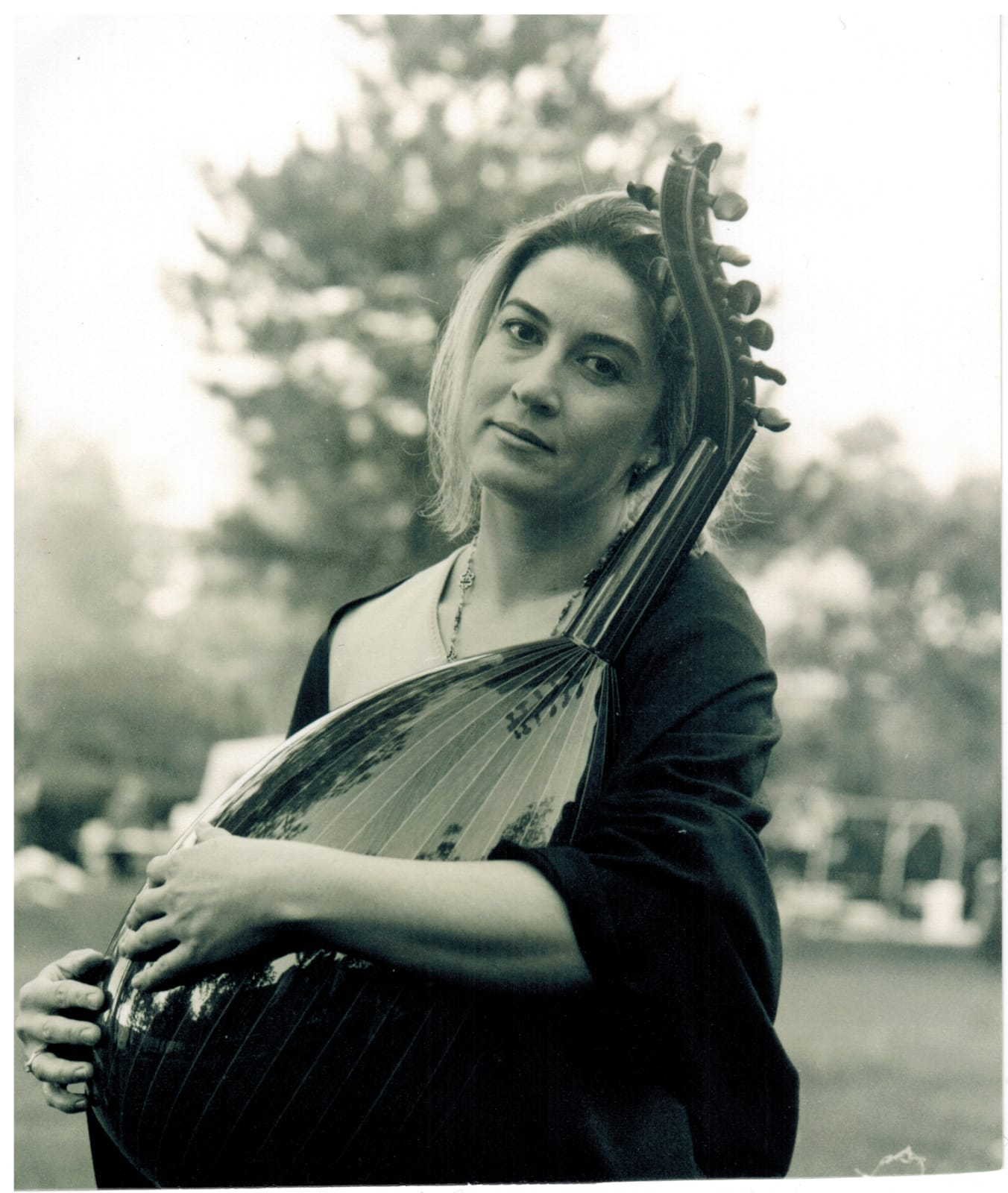
Gülçin Yahya Kaçar 2002

In 1988, she started to work as a lecturer of oud and flute in Music Department of Selcuk University. In 1993, she received her master's degree called Performance-note difference in Turkish Saz Music and in 2000, she obtained her doctorate called Oud Improvisations of Yorgo Bacanos. She worked with Prof. Mutlu Torun during her master and doctorate periods. In 1997, she was appointed to Gazi University Music Education Department as a lecturer. In 2004, she became an assistant professor, in 2009 she became a professor. She gave lessons in Oud, Turkish Music Theories, Work Analysis, Preparing and Developing Teaching Instrument Materials, Performance Analysis, Advanced Performance Methods, Style and Manner in licence, master and doctorate. She has 216 compositions. She has compositions such as Bergüzar-ı Çanakkale, Wisdoms from Hoca Ahmet Yesevi and fidelity to Mehmet Akif Ersoy, which are on subjects impressing Turkish Culture and History. She continues to compose themed compositions. Many of her articles have been published on Turkish Music and education in national and international scientific journals and media.

She was invited to radio and television programs. She gave recitals and conferences. She attended symposiums, panels and organized workshops. She represented Turkey in Bahrain, Morocco, Sweden, Syria, Oman, Korea, Kosovo, Macedonia, Romania, China, Portugal, Kazakhstan, Kyrgyzstan, Hungary, Turkmenistan, Azerbaijan, Belgium and Albania. Having a big repertory of Turkish Music, Gülçin Yahya Kaçar performs the works that belong to different period and composers in her recitals. She became the first oud artist to perform Mozart's piano concerto accompanied by a symphony orchestra.

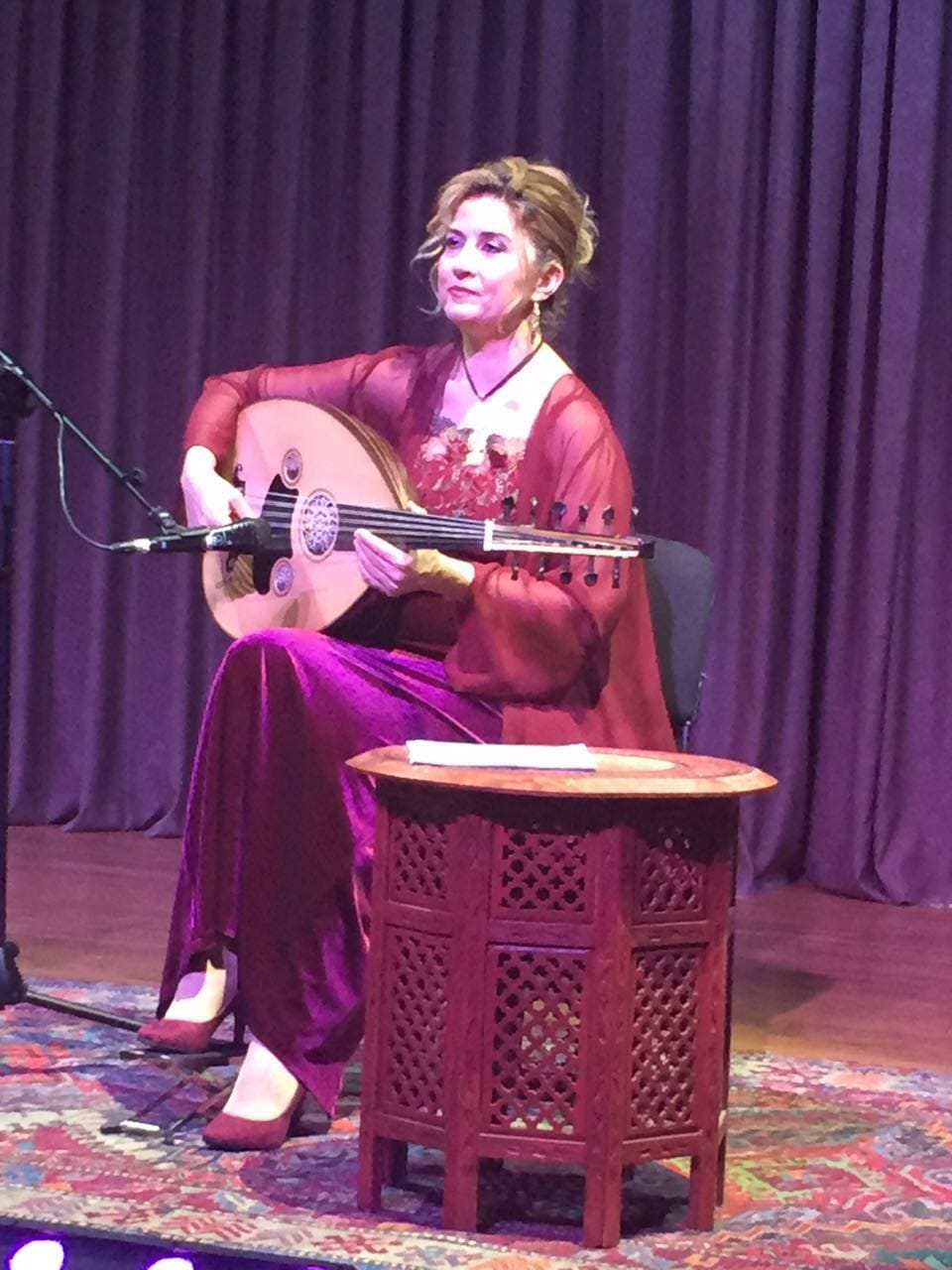
Gülçin Yahya Kaçar 2016 Bakü

In 2010, she founded Gazi University Turkish Music State Conservatory, the first Turkish Music State Conservatory in Ankara. She worked as a founding manager six years. She took part in the founding staff of Gazi University Fine Arts Institute. She was the pioneer of opening master and doctorate programs on Turkish Music. She was ranked as the second candidate for rector at Ankara Music and Fine Arts University. She worked as a Manager of Gazi University Turkish Music Education Research and Development Centre. She was Science Committee member of Atatürk Culture Centre Presidency of Atatürk Culture Language and History High Institution, the member of Hasan Hüsameddin Uşşaki Research and Development Centre Consultancy Institution, the advisor of Korea Embassy Culture-Art, the member of Ministry of Culture and Tourism Choirs Management Committee and the member of many other science and art committees. She gave lectures at the Diplomatic Academy of the Ministry of Foreign Affairs. She is a Member of the Honorary Board of Science Dissemination Awards.

She works as a lecturer in Ankara Hacı Bayram Veli University Turkish Music State Conservatory Instrument Education Department.

== Awards ==
- Az kullanılan Makam Ve Usullerde Beste Yarışması, Third Prize (Muhayyer Sünbüle Makamında, Ağır Düyek Usulünde Karabatak Peşrevi), Culture and Tourism Ministry, 2006
- Az kullanılan Makam Ve Usullerde Beste Yarışması, Third Prize (Hisar Makamında, Hafif Usulünde Medhâl), Culture and Tourism Ministry, 2006
- Sakarya Savaşı Kahramanlık Türküleri Beste Yarışması, 1. Mansiyon Ödülü (Karcığar Türkü: Dua Tepe Yanıyor, Yürekleri Yakıyor), Sakarya Zaferinin 86. yıldönümü anısına Municipality of Polatli, 2007
- Çanakkale'de Barış Beste Yarışması, Başarı Ödülü (Hüseynî Şarkı: Şehid-i Ekber), Culture and Tourism Ministry, 2015
- 2014 Yılı Kültür Sanat Hizmet Ödülü, Engürü Türk Müziği Derneği, 2015
- 4th International Rast Music Congress IRMC 2024, “Türk Müziği Besteciliği” Award

== Works ==
=== Books ===
- Ud Alıştırmaları Yurt Renkleri Yayınevi, Ankara 2001, ISBN 975-8303-33-3
- Ünlü Virtüöz Yorgo Bacanosun Ud Taksimleri, Kültür Bakanlığı, Ankara 2002, ISBN 975-17-3025-2
- Ud Metodu, Yurt Renkleri Yayınevi, Ankara 2002, ISBN 975-8303-32-5
- Ud Metodu, Yurt Renkleri Yayınevi, Ankara 2005, ISBN 978-605-4515-29-5
- Türk Müziği Çocuk Şarkıları, Maya Akademi Yayınevi, Ankara 2008, ISBN 978-605-5985-21-9
- Türk Mûsikîsi Üzerine Görüşler (Analiz ve Yorumlar), Maya Akademi Yayınevi, Ankara 2009, ISBN 978-605-5985-58-5
- Türk Mûsikîsi Rehberi, Maya Akademi Yayınevi, Ankara 2009, ISBN 978-605-5985-41-7
- Türk Mûsikîsi Güftelerinde Osmanlıca Kelime Ve Terkibler, Maya Akademi Yayınevi, Ankara 2012, ISBN 978-605-4515-13-4
- Gülzar-ı Mûsikî, Maya Akademi Yayınevi, Ankara 2012, ISBN 978-605-4515-04-2
- Türk Mûsikisi Üzerine Görüşler Analiz ve Yorumlar, Maya Akademi Yayınevi, Ankara 2012, ISBN 978-605-5985-58-5
- Ud Alıştırmaları Maya Akademi Yayınevi, Ankara 2012, ISBN 975-8303-33-3
- Ud Metodu, Gece Kitaplığı, Ankara 2017, ISBN 978-605-288-064-7
- Ud Alıştırmaları, Gece Kitaplığı, Ankara 2017, ISBN 978-605-288-065-4
- Klasik Türk Mûsikîsi Güftelerinde Osmanlıca Kelime ve Terkibler, Gece Kitaplığı, Ankara 2017, ISBN 978-605-180-819-2
- Gülzâr-ı Mûsikî, (Osmanlıca Kitap Tercümesi), Gece Kitaplığı, Ankara 2017, ISBN 978-605-180-746-1
- Bergüzâr-ı Çanakkale Besteleri Notalar- Şiirler ve Hikâyeleri, Gece Kitaplığı, Ankara 2018, ISBN 978-605-288-263-4 (İzzet Kaçar ile birlikte)
- Türk Mûsikîsinde Eser ve İcra Tahlili Yöntemleri, Gece Kitaplığı, Ankara 2020, ISBN 978-625-7904-68-1
- Ud Metodu, Egitim Yayinevi, Istanbul 2023, ISBN 978-625-6408-81-4
- Ud Alistirmalari, Egitim Yayinevi, Istanbul 2023, ISBN 978-625-6408-87-6
- Türk Mûsikîsi Rehberi, Egitim Yayinevi, Istanbul 2023, ISBN 978-625-6408-80-7
- Oud Exercises And Etudes, Egitim Yayinevi, Istanbul 2023, ISBN 978-625-6489-24-0
- Oud Method, Egitim Yayinevi, Istanbul 2023, ISBN 978-625-6489-23-3
- Turkish Music Guide, Egitim Yayinevi, Istanbul 2023, ISBN 978-625-6489-41-7

=== Articles in national and international books ===
- Üstad-ı Cihan Tanburî Cemil Bey, Editör: Ruhi Ayangil, İngilizce, İstanbul Büyükşehir Belediyesi Kültür Aş., İstanbul 2016, ISBN 978-605-9507-01-1
- Kuruluşunun 100.Yılında Dârül-Elhân’a Armağan, Yazı: (Darül-Elhân’dan Günümüze Klasik Türk Mûsikîsine Ait Kültür Aktarımını Sağlayan Çeşitli Neşriyat Örnekleri), Editör: Gülçin Yahya Kaçar, Türkçe, Atatürk Kültür Merkezi Başkanlığı, Ankara 2018, ISBN 978-975-16-3550-1
- Mesnevî Şârihi Ahmed Avni Konuk, Yazı:(Ahmet Avni Konuk’un Fihrist-İ Makamat Adlı Eserinin Değerlendirilmesi), Editörler: Ali Temizel, Nurgül Sucu Köroğlu, Selma Karadağ, Türkçe, Mevlâna Araştırmaları Enstitüsü, İstanbul 2019, ISBN 978-605-86510-6-7
- Türk Müziği Atlası, 4.Cilt, Yazı:(Osmanlı Sultanlarındaki Irsî Yetenek: Bestekârlık), Editörler: Feyzan Göher Vural- Timur Vural, İngilizce, T.C. Kültür Bakanlığı- Yeni Türkiye Stratejik Araştırma Merkezi, Ankara 2019, ISBN 978-605-5449-13-1
- Türk Müziği Atlası, 4. Cilt, Yazı:(Bir Medeniyetin Akatarımında İki Üstad: Yahya Kemal-Cinuçen Tanrıkorur) Editörler: Feyzan Göher Vural- Timur Vural, Türkçe, T.C. Kültür Bakanlığı- Yeni Türkiye Stratejik Araştırma Merkezi, Ankara 2019, ISBN 978-605-5449-13-1
- TÜRK MÛSİKÎSİ temalı 2021 YILI KÜLTÜR AJANDASI, Yunus Emre Enstitüsü Yayınları, Ankara 2021

=== CD booklets ===
- Vefatının 300. yılı anısına Buhûrizâde Mustafa Efendi ITRÎ (CD booklet 39 pages), T.C. Başbakanlık Atatürk Kültür Dil ve Tarih Yüksek Kurumu Atatürk Kültür Merkezi, Ankara 2012, 0111660
- Makasıd-ül Elhân’ın Yazılışının 600.Yılı dönümü Münasebeti İle Abdülkâdir-i Merâgi Besteleri (CD booklet 51 pages), T.C. Başbakanlık Atatürk Kültür Dil ve Tarih Yüksek Kurumu Atatürk Kültür Merkezi, Ankara 2014, 0507459

=== Albums ===
==== Solo albums ====
- Popular and Classıcal Turkish Music, CD, PS 65069 PLAY A SOUND, PRODUCTION SUNSET, France 1990
- Cinuçen Tanrıkorur Eserleri, CD, İstanbul Müzik Üretim, Ankara 2000 (With the contributions of the Ministry of Culture)
- Hayallerim, CD, Kaf Müzik, İstanbul 2002 (With the contributions of the Ministry of Culture)
- 1. Sipihr Peşrevi (Der Makām-ı Sipihr) Beste: Dimitri Kantemiroğlu, Yeni Kapı Müzik, İstanbul 2024, Spotify, Deezer, Youtube vb dijital platformlarda.
- Kürdî Semâî (Der Makām-ı Kürdî), Beste: Dimitri Kantemiroğlu Külliyatından, Yeni Kapı Müzik, İstanbul 2024, Spotify, Deezer, Youtube vb dijital platformlarda.
- Nişâbûrek Medhâl, Beste: Gülçin Yahya Kaçar, Yeni Kapı Müzik, İstanbul 2024, Spotify, Deezer, Youtube vb dijital platformlarda.
- Zâvil Medhâl, Beste: Gülçin Yahya Kaçar, Yeni Kapı Müzik, İstanbul 2024, Spotify, Deezer, Youtube vb dijital platformlarda.
- Gülizâr Sirto, Beste: Gülçin Yahya Kaçar, Yeni Kapı Müzik, İstanbul 2024, Spotify, Deezer, Youtube vb dijital platformlarda.

==== Albums being art director and oud performer ====
- Vefatının 300. yılı anısına Buhûrizâde Mustafa Efendi ITRÎ, (Genel Sanat Yönetmenliği ve Ud icracılığı) T.C. Başbakanlık Atatürk Kültür Dil ve Tarih Yüksek Kurumu Atatürk Kültür Merkezi, Ankara 2012, 0111660
- Makasıd-ül Elhân’ın Yazılışının 600. Yılı dönümü Münasebeti İle Abdülkâdir-i Merâgi Besteleri (Genel Sanat Yönetmenliği ve Ud icracılığı), T.C. Başbakanlık Atatürk Kültür Dil ve Tarih Yüksek Kurumu Atatürk Kültür Merkezi, Ankara 2014, 0507459

== Concerts abroad ==
- Turkish Classical Music Resital, Bahrain, 25 January 2000
- 45 Minute Special Programme, Stockholm, Sweden, 19 April 2002
- Mınıstry Of Culture Hırh Institute Of Music, Damascus, Syria, 18 May 2004
- Oud Recital, Damascus, Syria, 20 May 2004
- Günün Konuğu, Damascus, Syria, 18 May 2004
- Gençliğin Sesi Radyosu, Şamdaki Yıldızlar, Damascus, Syria, 19 May 2004
- Syrıan Radio And TV, TV Programı, Şam, Syria, 21 May 2004
- Uluslararası Karadeniz Ülkeleri Kültür Festivali, Seoul – South Korea,05.08.2010
- Uluslararası Karadeniz Ülkeleri Kültür Festivali, Seul – South Korea, 8 August 2010
- 5. Uluslararası Güneydoğu Avrupa Türkoloji Sempozyumu, Açılış Konseri, Prizren-Kosova, 12 April 2011
- 5. Uluslararası Güney-Doğu Avrupa Türkoloji Sempozyumu, Kapanış Konseri, Prizren-Kosova, 15 April 2011
- 7. Uluslararası Atatürk Kongresi, Üsküp-Macedonia, 17 November 2011
- Çin’de Türk Yılı" Etkinlikleri Kapsamında "Türk Mûsikîsinde Makamlar ve Türk Müziği Çalgılar, Pekin-China, 19 November 2013
- Çin’de Türk Yılı Etkinlikleri Kapsamında "Türk Mûsikîsinde Makamlar ve Türk Müziği Çalgıları, Shanghai-China, 21 November 2013
- Classical Turkish Music, Lisbon, Portugal, 6 March 2014
- Oud Recıtal, Lisbon- Portugal, 6 March 2014
- Yunus Okur Diller ile, Manas Üniversitesi, Kyrgyzstan-Bishkek, 26 May 2015
- Türkmence / Yunus Okur Diller İle (Genel Sanat Yönetmeni -Ud İcracısı), Devlet Tiyatro Salonu, Merv-Turkmenistan, 28 May 2015
- Ud Resitali, Azerbaycan Milli Konservatuvarı, Baku-Azerbaijan, 3 June 2016
- Tanburî Cemil Bey Konseri, Doğu Akdeniz Üniversitesi, North Cyprus, 6 May 2016
- Sultan Bestekarlar Konseri, Avrupa Birliği Nezdinde Türkiye Cumhuriyeti Daimi Temsilciliği, Brussels-Belgium,17 May 2016
- Sultan Bestekârlar Konseri, Avrupa Birliği Nezdinde Türkiye Cumhuriyeti Daimi Temsilciliğinde, Brussels-Belgium,19 May 2016
- Ud Resitali, Budapest- Hungary, 23 November 2016
- II. Uluslararası Mehmet Akif Ersoy Sempozyumu ve Bilim-Sanat Ödül Töreni, Tirana (Tiranë), Albania, 4 December 2017
