= Prisons in Turkey =

There are three types of prison in Turkey: closed, semi-open, and open. A further distinction is made between ordinary closed prisons and high-security prisons. Many prisons have separate blocks (or wings) for women and some also for children (juveniles), but there are also some prisons which are exclusively for women or children. Prisoners in Turkey must be divided, as per law, into remand prisoners (those being held in pre-trial detention) and convicted prisoners (whose sentences are being carried out). In practice, they are held in the same wards and cells.

== History ==
In the Ottoman Empire prisons were called dungeons (zindan). In Turkey, these were mostly dark and damp towers. The first prison was built in Sultanahmet quarter of Istanbul and it was called general prison (Hapishane-i Umumi).

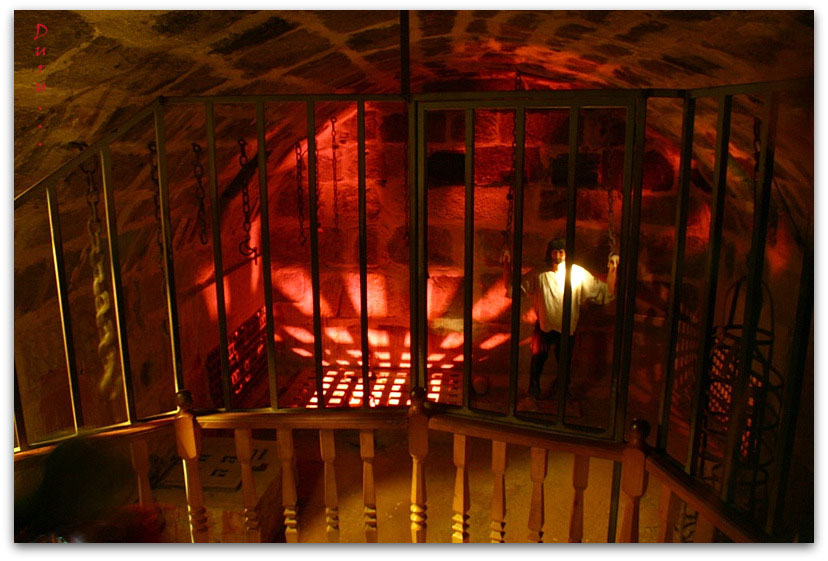
Historic Dungeon of Bodrum/Muğla inside Bodrum Castle built by Knights Hospitaller

Besides the death penalty the Penal Code of 1858 included three different types of sentences: rowing on a galley (kürek), pillorying (prangabentlik) and imprisonment in a tower (kalebentlik).

The Penal Code of 1 March 1926 (Law 765) made a difference between heavy crimes and corresponding sentences (ağır suç and ağır ceza) and light crimes (hafif suç and hafif ceza). Besides offences (cürüm) there is a separate law on infringements (kabahat). By Law 5349 dated 11 May 2005 the differentiation between light and heavy sentences was lifted.

=== Between 1980 and 2000 ===
On 12 September 1980 the military seized power in Turkey and the five generals (General Staff) announced martial law in all of the then existing 67 provinces. Members of armed and unarmed left and right organizations that had been engaged in bitter fighting were charged at military courts and in some places held in military prisons. The military prison of Mamak, in Ankara, Metris Prison (in Istanbul) and Diyarbakır Prison (often called the hell of Diyarbakır) gained notoriety.

Because of the large number of prisoners new prisons were built. In a report of November 1988, Amnesty International said that the number of prisons had increased to 644 and their capacity had been raised from 55,000 to more than 80,000. Since 1986 relatives of prisoners organized in the Human Rights Association (HRA) or in groups in solidarity with certain prisoners such as TAYAD. With their help the prisoners tried to make their demands for improved prison conditions for which they frequently went on hunger strikes.

In April 1991 Law 3713 on Fighting Terrorism (called Anti-Terror-Law, ATL) was passed. Article 16 provided that all prisoners charged under this law had to be held in high security prisons.

=== Since 2000 ===
A map of incarceration rates by country

In 1996 the political prisoners succeeded in their objection to be transferred to the first high security prison in Eskişehir (it was called "special type prison"). Their hunger strike resulted in the death of 12 prisoners. In 2000 a similar action against the high security prisons (now called F-type Prisons) was not successful, although the death toll was much higher. There are currently 13 F-type prisons (14, if the prison on İmralı Island is added) and two D-type prisons (also high security prisons). The prison population statistics show an immense rise from the year 2000 through 2016. In 2000, the combined number of imprisoned individuals was 49,512. In the year 2016, that number has increased to 200,339. On this date, the rate of incarceration was 285 prisoners per 100,000 Turkish residents. In November 2018, the total incarceration rate increased to 260,000 people. This number incorporates pre-trial convicts. The prison population rate is 318 people per 100,000 of the national population. An estimated national population of November 2018 is 81.68 million. The maximum space of the prison system is 220,000 possible detainees as of November 2018. As of November 2018, the occupancy level is at 118.2%, 18.2% over capacity.

== Facts and figures ==
According to the General Directorate for Penal and Arrest Centres (Ceza ve Tevkifevleri Genel Müdürlüğü, part of the Ministry of Justice) 384 prisons existed in Turkey as of 1 December 2008. 346 of them were closed and 28 were open prisons. In addition there were three closed and one open prison for women and three correctional centres for children. For the same date the number of prisoners was given as 103,296; among them 44,038 on remand and 59,258 convicts.

On the homepage of the General Directorate for Penal and Arrest Centres figures on prisoners can be found on the number of prisoners for each year. The Human Rights Foundation of Turkey has included such figures in their annual reports.

Year	Convicted			On remand			Total
Year	Ordinary	"Terror"	Sum	Ordinary	"Terror"	Sum	Total
1990	27,731	1,642	29,373	14,488	1,745	16,233	45,606
1991	10,652	395	11,047	14,760	1,044	15,804	26,851
1992	12,301	522	12,823	15,597	3,062	18,659	31,482
1993	14,300	847	15,147	14,681	4,977	19,658	34,805
1994	15,787	1,094	16,881	15,638	6,412	22,050	38,931
1995	20,371	1,637	22,008	17,058	7,025	24,083	46,091
1996	24,651	2,328	26,979	17,697	6,207	23,904	50,883
1997	32,155	4,179	36,334	19,346	4,926	24,272	60,606
1998	31,647	4,239	35,886	19,670	4,835	24,505	60,391
1999	37,986	6,145	44,131	19,953	3,497	23,450	67,581
2000	20,378	4,467	24,855	20,467	4,190	24,657	49,512
2001	22,425	5,116	27,541	24,886	3,182	28,068	55,609
2002	25,514	5,123	30,637	25,928	2,622	28,550	59,187
2003	28,554	4,161	32,715	29,605	1,976	31,581	64,296
2004	23,840	2,170	26,010	30,302	1,618	31,920	57,930
2005	22,765	2,093	24,858	29,475	1,537	31,012	55,870
2006	24,220	2,116	26,336	42,222	1,719	44,141	70,477
2007	34,852	2,418	37,608	47,091	2,102	53,229	90,837
2008	42,234	2,540	45,207	50,470	2,899	58,028	103,235

Meanwhile, the statistics also include the category "crimes to increase profit" (tr: çıkar amaçlı suçlar, meaning organized crime, punishable according to Article 220 of the Turkish Penal Code). Since 2010 the cases that could not be attributed to a specific group were also included.

Years	Convicted					On remand					
	Ordinary	Terror	Organized	Unclear	Sum	Ordinary	Terror	Organized	Unclear	Sum	Total
2009	53067	2967	547		56581	52512	3361	3886		59759	116340
2010	80440	3682	993	1451	86566	29676	2535	1566	471	34238	120814
2011	86542	4179	907	989	92617	29901	4266	1372	448	35987	128604

On 31 January 2010 the official figures were:

Year	Convicted			On remand			Total
Year	Ordinary	"Terror"	Sum	Ordinary	"Terror"	Sum	Total
2010	53,805	3,051	56,856	57,024	3,254	60,691	117,547

The following figures were presented for 31 March 2012:

Group	On remand	Under review	Convicted	Total
Ordinary	29,890	17,597	72,022	119.509
Terror	4,643	481	3,846	8,970
Organized crime	1,283	389	522	2,194
Unspecified	457	42	1,197	1,696
Total	36.273	18,509	77,587	132.369

In June 2010 Justice Minister Sadullah Ergin answered a question tabled by Batman deputy Bengi Yıldız. He stated that between 2010 and 2015 a total of 86 new prisons with a capacity of 40,026 prisoners were to be built.

== Prison types ==
Using the official material of the General Directorate for Penal and Arrest Centres the Democratic Turkey Forum prepared a table on prisons in Turkey as of October 2008. Further details have been included as "particulars".

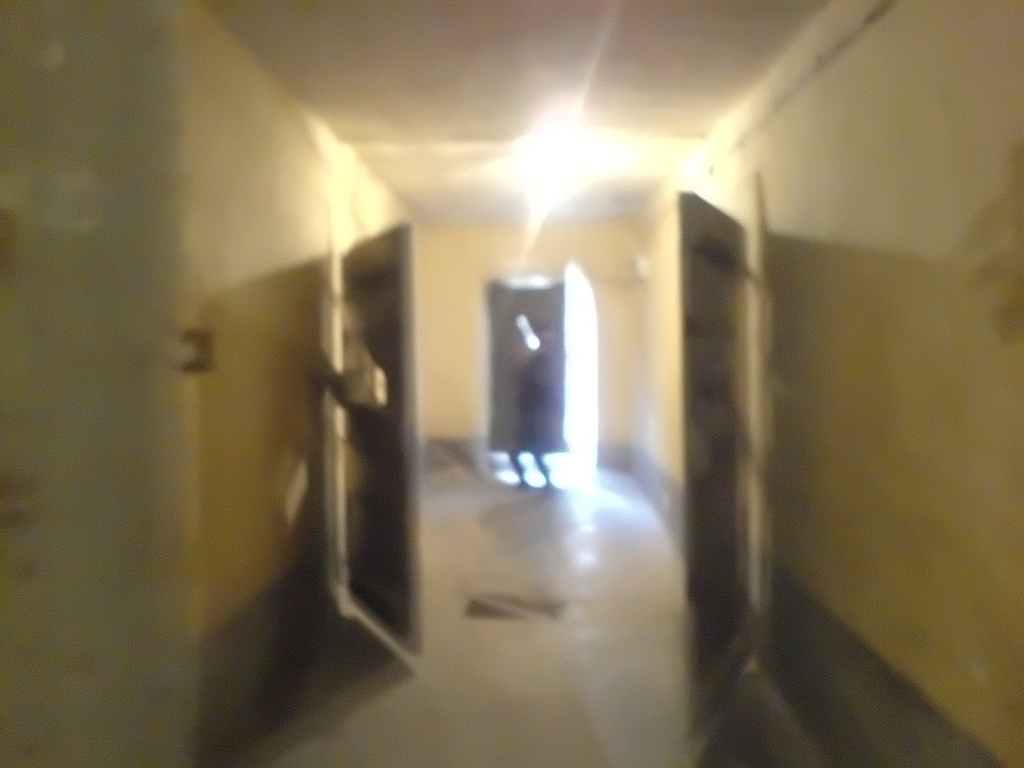
Sinop E-type Prison

Type	Number	Capacity (single)	Capacity (complete)	Particulars
A	21	24-30	792	Prisons built in district between the 1950s and 1970s. There are 4 wards (koğuş), bathroom, kitchen, library and a conference hall.
A1	16	24-40	508	Further to type A: there are two cells and room next to the wards that can be used as a kitchen.
A2	17	40	744	5 wards and 2 disciplinary cells.
A3	31	60	2,295	6 wards.
B	16	64	1,068	7 wards and 2 disciplinary cells; each ward has its own exercise yard (havalandırma).
C	7	164-300	1,696	8 wards and 4 disciplinary cells.
D	2	750	1,732	11 blocks, one block for administration; 230 rooms (cells). Block E is for communal use (laundry, library etc.). The lower floors of block H and L consist of disciplinary cells. The first and second floor of block G have 10 rooms each for observation (müşahade) on arrival. This block also has two infirmaries with 10 beds each. These prisons are built on the system of individual cells and cells for three people.
E	45	600-1,000	29,753	Built on two floors based on the ward (koğuş) system and later changed to rooms for 2, 4, 6, 8 and 10 persons. Each room has its own exercise yard. The lower floors are for eating; the upper floors are the dormitories.
F	13	368	4,966	See F-type Prisons (Turkey)
H	5	500	3,255	Built on two floors on the room (cell) system. There are 200 individual cells and 100 cells for 3 persons.
K1	83	60	3553	They are found in districts with 4 wards and 2 disciplinary cells. Each ward has its own exercise yard.
K2	24	60-150	1,446	Like type K1 with 6 wards and 2 disciplinary cells.
L	16		15,084	Closed prisons, built in big cities in place of old prisons. There are units for 7 people measuring 208.93 m^{2} (2,248.9 sq ft) in total, cells have 12.45 m^{2} (134.0 sq ft), exercise yards have 165.19 m^{2} (1,778.1 sq ft) and common living space is 56.59 m^{2} (609.1 sq ft). Cells are closed at night; during the day 7 prisoners are together. There are 61 units for 7 people, 4 rooms for 3 people and 40 individual cells.
M	24		9,107	These prisons that were built on two floors in the ward system, cells for 4, 6, 8, 10 people were made. Each room has its own exercise yard. The prisons have 6 disciplinary cells.
T	4	616	6,277	They were built in big cities in place of old prisons. There are 72 rooms for 8 prisoners, 8 rooms for 3 prisoners and 16 individual cells of 16 sqm. The (living and sleeping) room for 3 people measures 27 m^{2} (290 sq ft). The sleeping space for 8 people (upper floor) is 28 m^{2} (300 sq ft) and the living space (lower floor) 32.5 m^{2} (350 sq ft). For the exercise 8 people have a yard of 35 m^{2} (380 sq ft) und 3 people of 30 m^{2} (320 sq ft). The sports hall measures 494 m^{2} (5,320 sq ft) and outside 251 m^{2} (2,700 sq ft). There is space for 450 people during open visits and 36 people for closed visits. Room for 32 lawyers meeting their clients exists.
F(o)	1	350	350	open prison for women
F(c)	Paşakapısı			closed prison for women; Paşakapısı and Bakırköy are in Istanbul
	Bakırköy	506		construction started in 2008; 38 units for 12 people each; 2 units for 3 people and 44 individual cells.
	Sincan	352		District close to Ankara, 24 units for 12 people each, 12 units for 3 people each, 28 individual cells.
K(c)	3		366	closed prison for children
K(e)	3	100-250	360	education centre for children; juveniles aged 12 to 18 are held here. In case an education was continuing at the age of 18 permission can be given to stay longer (up to the age of 21).
(c)	23		6,277	
(o)	28		6,405	
(o)	38		2,617	

== Comments of international institutions ==
Besides NGOs such as Amnesty International or Human Rights Watch the European Committee for the Prevention of Torture and Inhuman or Degrading Treatment or Punishment (CPT) has frequently dealt with the situation in Turkish prisons. A major concern were the F-type prisons, the high security prisons that the CPT encouraged Turkey to build. and the situation on the island İmralı, where Abdullah Öcalan has been the only prisoner since 1999.

On 6 March 2008 a report was published on a visit to the island between 19 and 22 May 2007. This was the fourth visit. In conclusion the CPT said (in para 31.): Abdullah Öcalan has now been imprisoned, as the sole inmate of the High-Security Closed Prison of Imralı - an island which is difficult to reach - for almost eight and a half years. Although the situation of indisputable isolation to which the prisoner has been subjected since 16 February 1999 has had adverse effects over the years, the CPT's previous visits had not revealed significant harmful consequences for his physical and psychological condition. This assessment must now be revised, in the light of the evolution of Abdullah Öcalan's physical and mental condition."

During visits to other facilities the CPT marked certain shortcomings. The report of 8 December 2005 (on a visit in 2004), for instance, included the following recommendations:

- staff at Izmir (Buca) Closed Prison and the E-type prisons in Aydın and Gaziantep to be given a firm reminder that the ill-treatment of inmates is not acceptable and will be the subject of severe sanctions; it should be made clear to them that prisoners who breach discipline must be dealt with exclusively in accordance with existing disciplinary procedures and that any form of unofficial punishment will not be tolerated (paragraph 50).
- the Turkish authorities to take all necessary steps to develop the communal activity programmes at Izmir F-type Prison No. 1, in terms of both the range of activities on offer and the number of prisoners engaging in those activities; in this connection, the remarks made in paragraphs 57 and 58 to be taken fully into account (paragraph 59);
- immediate steps to be taken to ensure that every prisoner at Aydın and Gaziantep E-type Prisons has his/her own bed (paragraph 63);
- the necessary steps to be taken to ensure that occupancy rates in all prisoner accommodation units at Aydın and Gaziantep E-type Prisons are of a reasonable level (paragraph 63);
- the level of hygiene in prisoner accommodation areas at Gaziantep E-type Prison to be reviewed (paragraph 63).

== See also ==
- List of prisons in Turkey
- 2016–present purges in Turkey
- Human rights in Turkey
- Midnight Express (book), a 1977 nonfiction book about a young American sent to a Turkish prison
  - Midnight Express (film), a 1978 film adaptation of the book
