= Karaözü =

- Neighbourhood
- Location within Turkey Location within Turkey Central Anatolia
- Coordinates: 39°12′N 35°56′E
- Country: Turkey
- Province: Kayseri
- District: Sarıoğlan
- Population (2022): 633
- Time zone: UTC+3 (TRT)

Karaözü is a neighbourhood of the municipality and district of Sarıoğlan, Kayseri Province, Turkey. Its population is 633 (2022). Before the 2013 reorganisation, it was a town (belde).

The village is located at the tripoint of Kayseri, Sivas, and Yozgat provinces. It was founded in the late 18th century.
