= Gömürgen =

- Neighbourhood
- Location in Turkey Gömürgen (Turkey Central Anatolia)
- Coordinates: 39°02′N 36°13′E
- Country: Turkey
- Province: Kayseri
- District: Akkışla
- Elevation: 1,550 m (5,090 ft)
- Population (2022): 508
- Time zone: UTC+3 (TRT)
- Area code: 0352

Gömürgen is a neighbourhood of the municipality and district of Akkışla, Kayseri Province, Turkey. Its population is 508 (2022). Before the 2013 reorganisation, it was a town (belde).

== History ==
Gömürgen lies in Anatolia, one of the earliest settled areas in the world. Exact data for the establishment of the village are not well known. It is believed that between 1594 and 1644 seven Turkmeni families emigrated from Central Asia to the area, and continue to live there as sheep breeders.

== Geography ==
Gömürgen is 6 kilometers from Akkışla and 86 kilometers from Kayseri. To the east and southeast lies the Hınzır mountain and the village Ortaköy. Akkışla lies to the west of Gömürgen. South of Gömürgen, also in the district of Akkisla, is the district Uğurlu and the village Ganışeh.

Gömürgen lies over 1400-1500m above sea level. The vegetation is desertlike. Constant grazing and clearing of the ground around the area to convert it to pastureland, results in the desertlike vegetation, as well as creating erosion with associated dangers.

== Mayor ==
Mayors of the former municipality of Gömürgen:

| Nr. | Mayor | Tenure of Office | Party |
|---|---|---|---|
| 23. | Selahattin Baydan | 2009-2014 | CHP |
| 22. | Selahattin Baydan | 2004–2009 | CHP |
| 21. | Selahattin Baydan | 1999–2004 | CHP |
| 20. | İsmet Demirkol | 1994–1999 | DYP |
| 19. | Selahattin Baydan | 1992–1994 | CHP |
| 18. | Derviş Eşiyok | -1992 | |
| 17. | Mehmet Koçer | - | |
| 16. | Hacı Efe | - | |
| 15. | Mustafa Koçer | - | |
| 14. | Ahmet Eraslan | - | |
| 13. | Kadir Koçyiğit | - | |
| 12. | Abdurrahman Koçyılmaz | - | |
| 11. | Hafız Koçyiğit | - | |
| 10. | Mustafa Koçak | - | |
| 9. | Haydar Bayram | - | |
| 8. | Osman Türkay | - | |
| 7. | Mehmet Kılıç | - | |
| 6. | H. Ömer Caner | - | |
| 5. | Ömer Osman Aydoğan | - | |
| 4. | H. Mehmet Turhal | - | |
| 3. | Abdullah Yıldırım | - | |
| 2. | Mahmut Özer | - | |
| 1. | Muslu Mutlu | - | |
