= Bünyan =

- District and municipality
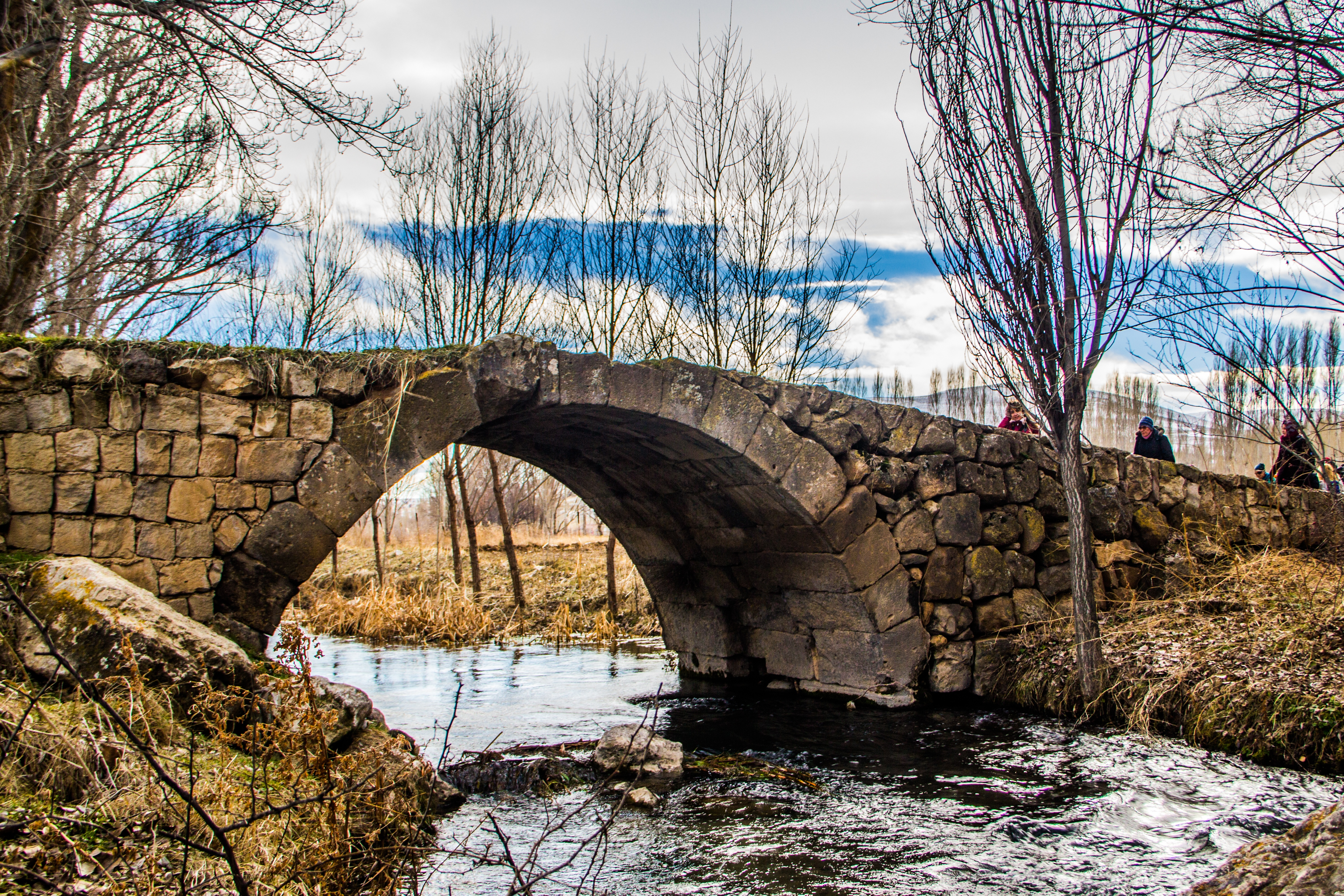
- Bünyan stone bridge

- Logo

- Map showing Bünyan District in Kayseri Province

- Location within Turkey Location within Turkey Central Anatolia
- Coordinates: 38°50′55″N 35°51′33″E
- Country: Turkey
- Province: Kayseri

Government
  - Mayor: Selahattin Metin (MHP)
- Area: 1,210 km^{2} (470 sq mi)
- Population (2022): 29,704
  - Density: 24.5/km^{2} (63.6/sq mi)
- Time zone: UTC+3 (TRT)
- Area code: 0352
- Website: www.bunyan.bel.tr

Bünyan is a municipality and district of Kayseri Province, Turkey. Its area is 1,210 km^{2}, and its population is 29,704 (2022).

== History ==
Evidence that the history of Bunyan is very old can be understood from the existing caves and ruins in the villages near the district. It is understood that it dates back to the Hittites from 4000-1200 BC. It was Turkified during the Anatolian Seljuk State, which experienced Iranian, Assyrian and Roman cultures. The region was annexed to the lands of the Ottoman Empire by Yavuz Sultan Selim in 1515.

The district, which used to be called Sarımsaklı, was removed from the Pınarbaşı (Aziziye) district of Sivas Province in 1895 and became a district by gaining the name of Bünyan-ı Hamid. This name means "The Structure of Hamid". As a result of the declaration of the Constitutional Monarchy in 1908, the Ottoman Sultan II. With the abdication of Abdülhamid, the name Hamid was abolished and his name continued as Bünyan. In 1912, it was separated from Sivas province and connected to Kayseri Province.

The historical artifacts in the region are from the times of the Hittites and Seljuks. Some of these works are the Daniş Ali Bey Mosque in Büyük Bürüngüz village, Bünyan Ulu Mosque in Cami-i Kebir neighborhood, Kayabaşı Caves, Abdurrahman Gazi Tomb and caves in Samağır village, Şammaspir Church in Doğanlar neighborhood, Seyit Halil Tomb in Karakaya town, Priest Fountain in Yenice neighborhood, Sultanhanı village. Khan and Karatay Inn in Karadayı village.

== Composition ==
There are 46 neighbourhoods in Bünyan District:

- Ağcalı
- Akçatı
- Akmescit
- Asmakaya
- Bayramlı
- Burhaniye
- Büyüktuzhisar
- Camiicedit
- Camiikebir
- Cumhuriyet
- Dağardı
- Dervişağa
- Doğanlar
- Ekinciler
- Elbaşı
- Emirören
- Fatih
- Gergeme
- Girveli
- Güllüce
- Hezarşah
- İbrahimbey
- İğdecik
- Kahveci
- Karacaören
- Karahıdırlı
- Karakaya
- Karatay
- Kardeşler
- Köprübaşı
- Kösehacılı
- Koyunabdal
- Musaşeyh
- Pirahmet
- Sağlık
- Samağır
- Sıvgın
- Sultanhanı
- Sümer
- Topsöğüt
- Yağmurbey
- Yakutiye
- Yavuzselim
- Yeni Süksün
- Yenice
- Yünören
