= Özvatan =

- District and municipality
- Map showing Özvatan District in Kayseri Province

- Location in Turkey Özvatan (Turkey Central Anatolia)
- Coordinates: 39°06′N 35°42′E
- Country: Turkey
- Province: Kayseri

Government
  - Mayor: Halit Demir (MHP)
- Area: 270 km^{2} (100 sq mi)
- Population (2022): 3,819
  - Density: 14/km^{2} (37/sq mi)
- Time zone: UTC+3 (TRT)
- Area code: 0352

Özvatan (formerly Çukur and Siricha (Ancient Greek: Σάριχα or Σιριχά) is a municipality and district of Kayseri Province, Turkey. Its area is 270 km^{2}, and its population is 3,819 (2022). It is located in the north east of the province, almost 70 km from Kayseri and 12 km east of Felahiye. It has a harsh climate being too cold in winter and too hot in summer. The mayor is Halit Demir (MHP).

== History ==
The oldest ruins in the district are the Harsa and Zırha Castles, which are located on the side of the river Kızılırmak and are thought to belong to Hittites. It is known that mining and trade were engaged in the region during the Hittites period. Around 430 BC, Zırha Castle was added to the territory of Rome, so it is possible to come across traces of Roman Civilization in the region.

== Composition ==
There are 13 neighbourhoods in Özvatan District:

- Alparslan
- Aşağıboğaziçi
- Bahçelievler
- Cumhuriyet
- Güney
- Kale
- Kavaklı
- Kermelik
- Küpeli
- Taşlıkköy
- Tuğlaşah
- Yeni
- Yukarıboğaziçi
