= Hacılar, Kayseri =

Hacılar
- District and municipality
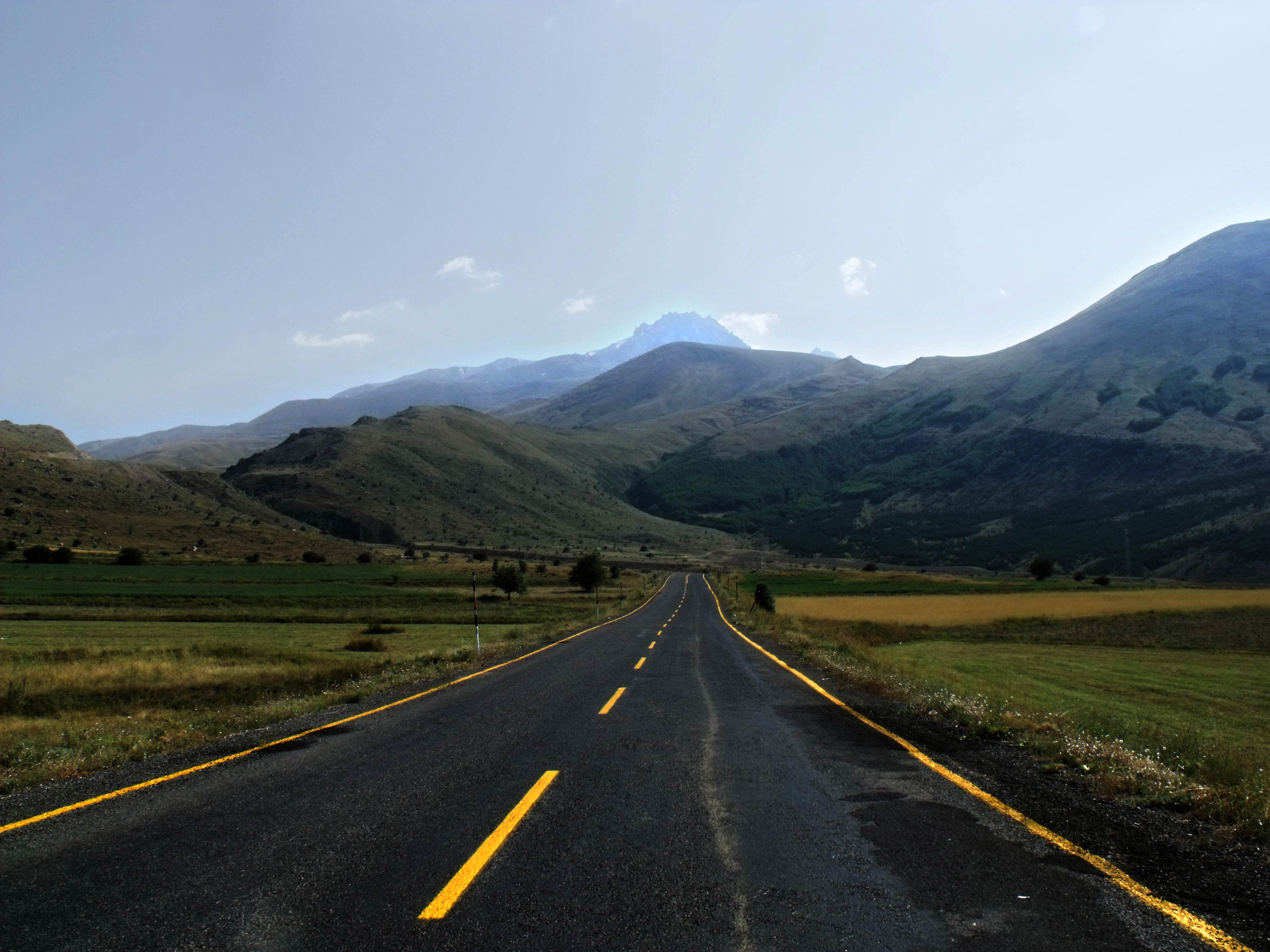
- Road to Hacılar

- Logo

- Map showing Hacılar District in Kayseri Province

- Location within Turkey Location within Turkey Central Anatolia
- Coordinates: 38°38′59″N 35°27′01″E
- Country: Turkey
- Province: Kayseri

Government
  - Mayor: Bilal Özdoğan (AKP)
- Area: 187 km^{2} (72 sq mi)
- Population (2022): 12,465
  - Density: 66.7/km^{2} (173/sq mi)
- Time zone: UTC+3 (TRT)
- Area code: 0352
- Website: www.hacilar.bel.tr

Hacılar is a municipality and district of Kayseri Province, Turkey. Its area is 187 km^{2}, and its population is 12,465 (2022). As of October 2026, the mayor is Bilal Özdoğan (AKP).

== Composition ==
There are 12 neighbourhoods in Hacılar District:

- Akdam
- Akyazı
- Aşağı
- Beğendik
- Erciyes
- Hürmetçi
- Karpuzsekisi
- Orta
- Sakarçiftliğiköyü
- Yediağaç
- Yeni
- Yukarı
