= Akkışla =

- District and municipality
- Map showing Akkışla District in Kayseri Province

- Location within Turkey Location within Turkey Central Anatolia
- Coordinates: 39°00′N 36°10′E
- Country: Turkey
- Province: Kayseri

Government
  - Mayor: Mustafa Dursun (CHP)
- Area: 371 km^{2} (143 sq mi)
- Elevation: 1,370 m (4,490 ft)
- Population (2022): 5,563
  - Density: 15.0/km^{2} (38.8/sq mi)
- Time zone: UTC+3 (TRT)
- Postal code: 38830
- Area code: 0352
- Website: www.akkisla.bel.tr

Akkışla is a municipality and district of Kayseri Province, Turkey. Its area is 371 km^{2}, and its population is 5,563 (2022).

== Composition ==
There are 15 neighbourhoods in Akkışla District:

- Akin
- Alevkışla
- Ganişeyh
- Girinci
- Gömürgen
- Gömürgen Yeni
- Gümüşsu
- Kululu
- Manavuz
- Ortaköy
- Şen
- Uğurlu
- Yeni
- Yeşil
- Yukarı
