= Yeşilhisar =

- District and municipality
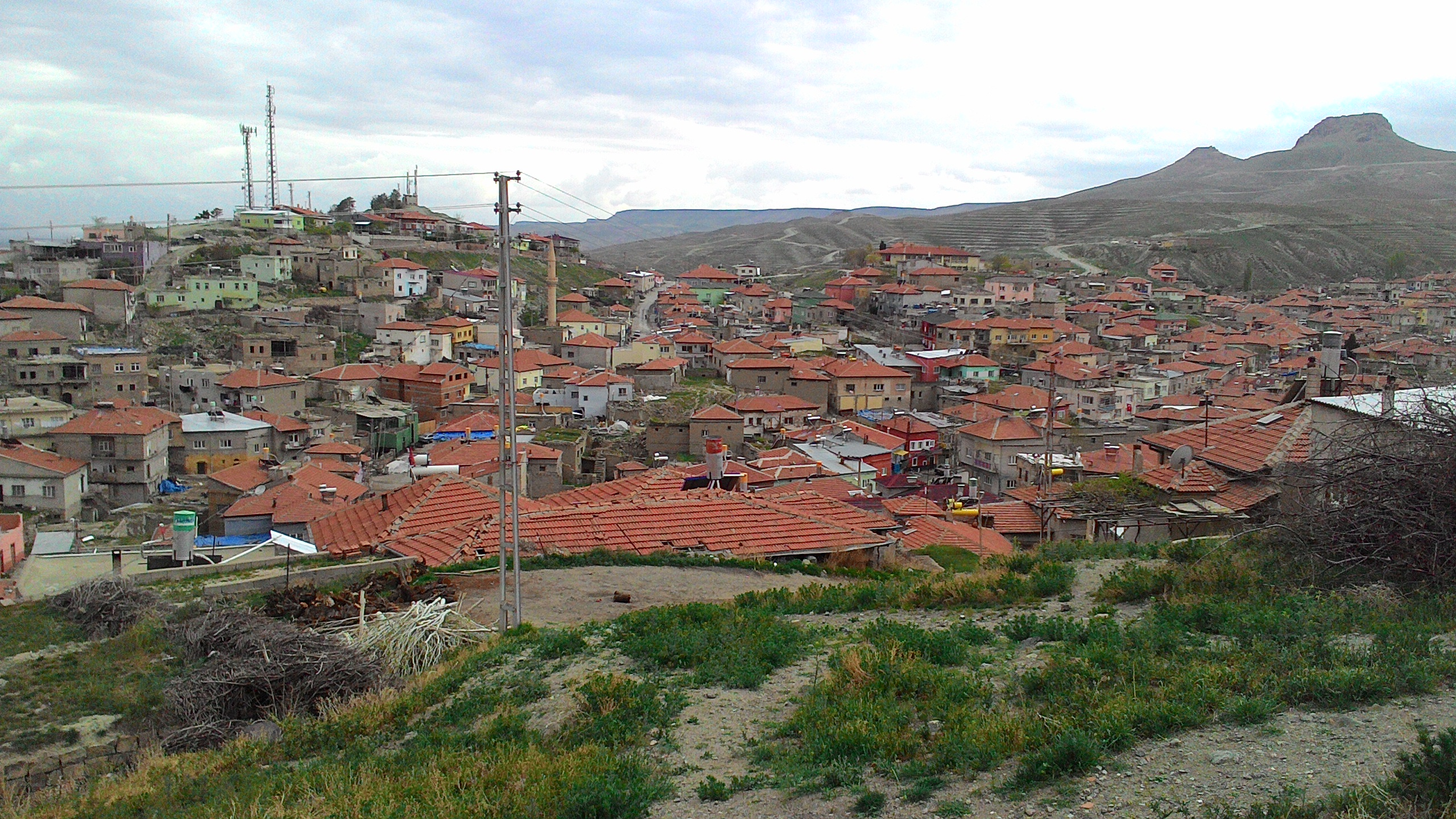

- Map showing Yeşilhisar District in Kayseri Province

- Location within Turkey Location within Turkey Central Anatolia
- Coordinates: 38°21′0″N 35°5′12″E
- Country: Turkey
- Province: Kayseri

Government
  - Mayor: Halit Taşyapan (AKP)
- Area: 913 km^{2} (353 sq mi)
- Population (2022): 15,531
  - Density: 17.0/km^{2} (44.1/sq mi)
- Time zone: UTC+3 (TRT)
- Area code: 0352
- Website: www.yesilhisar.bel.tr

Yeşilhisar, formerly known as Kbistra, is a municipality and district of Kayseri Province, Turkey. Its area is 913 km^{2}, and its population is 15,531 (2022).

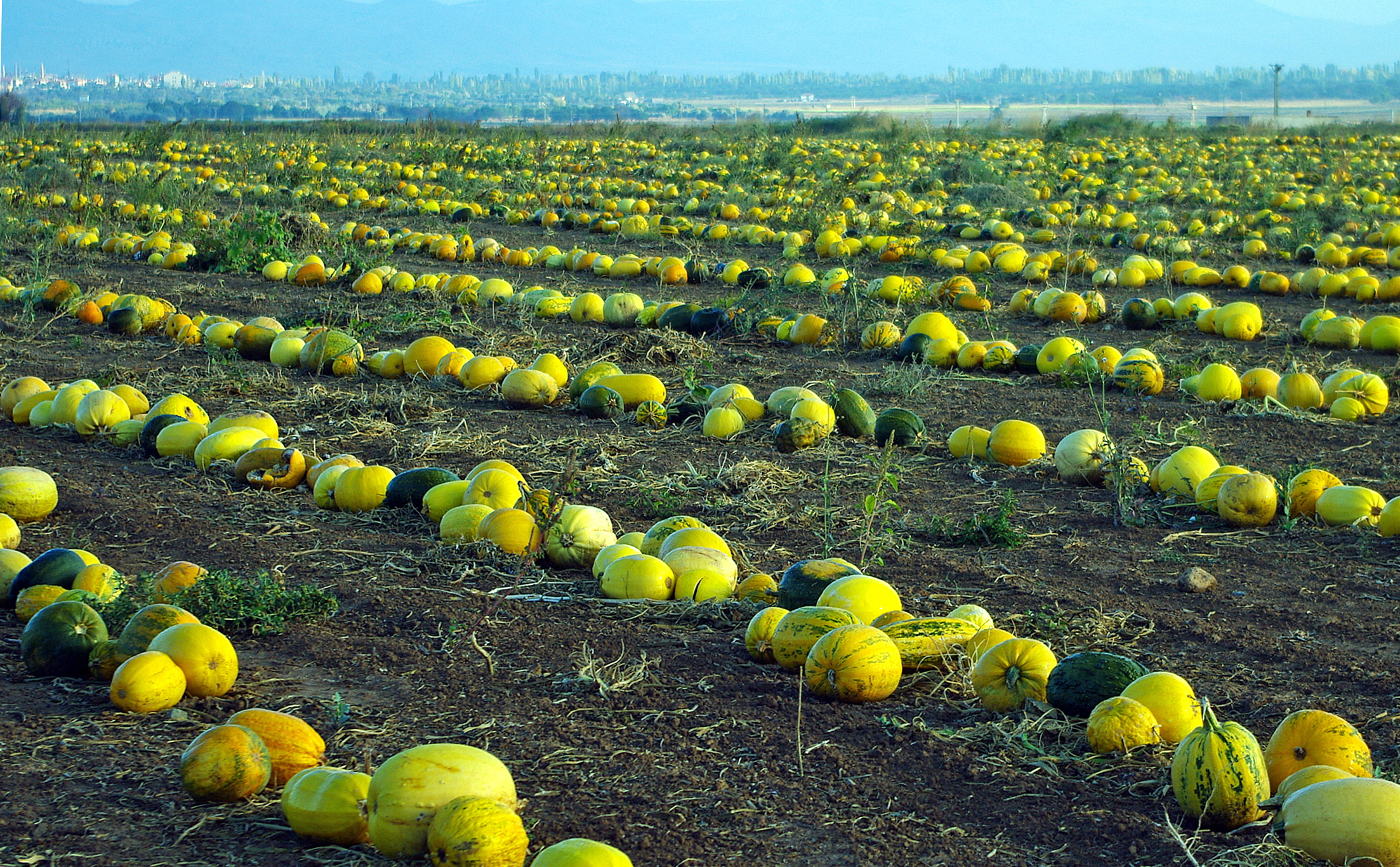
Pumpkin field in Yeşilhisar

== History ==
Although the date of establishment of the town is not known for certain, first the Hittites and then the Persians came under the command of Alexander in 3500 BC. In 317 BC, this region came under the rule of the Roman Empire. Kbistra or Siyiera, which is mentioned among the eight big cities of the Cappadocia region, is today's Yeşilhisar. It's also sometimes referred to as Cyzistra.

Kbistra, which came under the rule of Iran in 256 BC and then again by the Byzantine Empire, passed into the hands of Muslims for the first time with the conquest of Battal Gazi in 672. Yeşilhisar came under the rule of Abbasids, Danishmends and Seljuks, İlhanlılar and Karamanoğulları in 1114, and Yeşilhisar came under the rule of the Ottomans in the time of Yıldırım Bayezid. Fatih Sultan Mehmet appointed Koçi Bey for the conquest of Yeşilhisar.

== Composition ==
There are 35 neighbourhoods in Yeşilhisar District:

- Akköy
- Araplı
- Başköy
- Beyleryukarı
- Büğet
- Çadırkaya
- Camikebir
- Cumhuriyet
- Derbentbaşı
- Doğanlı
- Erdemli
- Fatih
- Fevzioğlu
- Gülbayır
- Güney
- Güzelöz
- İçmece
- İdris
- Kaleköy
- Karacabey
- Kavakköy
- Kayadibi
- Keler
- Keşlik
- Köşk
- Kovalı
- Kuşçu
- Kuzey
- Mahmudiye
- Musahacılı
- Ovaçiftlikköy
- Soğanlı
- Yavuz Selim
- Yenişehir
- Yeşilova

== Economy ==
The economy of the district is agriculture based. Irrigated agriculture is practiced on 60% of the 500,000 decares of land planted. Apples, apricots and other fruits are grown in irrigated areas. Sugar beet and potato are the leading industrial plants.

== Places of Interest ==
- Agios Eustatios Church in Güzelöz
