= Sarız =

- District and municipality
- Map showing Sarız District in Kayseri Province

- Location in Turkey Sarız (Turkey Central Anatolia)
- Coordinates: 38°28′45″N 36°30′2″E
- Country: Turkey
- Province: Kayseri

Government
  - Mayor: Ömer Faruk Eroğlu (CHP)
- Area: 1,173 km^{2} (453 sq mi)
- Population (2022): 9,282
  - Density: 7.913/km^{2} (20.49/sq mi)
- Time zone: UTC+3 (TRT)
- Area code: 0352
- Website: www.sariz.bel.tr

Sarız, formerly known as Sáros (Greek: Σάρος), is a municipality and district of Kayseri Province, Turkey. Its area is 1,173 km^{2}, and its population is 9,282 (2022). The mayor is Ömer Faruk Eroğlu.

== History ==
The history of the district goes back to ancient times, to 700 BC. Cilicia remained under the rule of Dulkadiroğulları Principality from Byzantine Empire and beylik, and was included in Ottoman Empire in the period of Yavuz Sultan Selim in 1515. The settlement, which was shown as a part of the Hurman district of the Elbistan district in the 16th century Ottoman records, was connected to the Aziziye district, which was created in 1861. registered as a sub-district. During this period, the center of Sariz was called "Koyyeri". In the records of 1910, it is stated that Sarız, which is a township, has 46 villages. The Municipality organization was established on July 30, 1914, upon the request of the Sivas Governor of the time being approved by the Ottoman Ministry of Internal Affairs. In 1927, it was separated from Sivas and connected to Kayseri. In 1946, it was separated from the Pınarbaşı district to which it was affiliated and became an independent district.

== Composition ==
There are 44 neighbourhoods in Sarız District:

- Akoluk
- Altısöğüt
- Avşarobası
- Ayranlık
- Bahçeli
- Büyükörtülü
- Büyüksöbeçimen
- Çağşak
- Çatalpınar
- Çavdar
- Çörekdere
- Dallıkavak
- Damızlık
- Darıdere
- Dayoluk
- Değirmentaş
- Fettahdere
- Gümüşali
- Günesen
- İncedere
- İncemağara
- Karapınar
- Karayurt
- Kemer
- Kırkısrak
- Kıskaçlı
- Kızılpınar
- Küçükkabaktepe
- Küçükörtülü
- Küçüksöbeçimen
- Kurdini
- Kurudere
- Kuşçu
- Mirzaağa
- Mollahüseyinler
- Oğlakkaya
- Ördekli
- Sancakağıl
- Tavlaköy
- Tekneli
- Yaylacı
- Yedioluk
- Yeni
- Yeşilkent

== Climate ==
Sarız has a dry-summer continental climate (Köppen: Dsb). Summers are dry, with warm days and cool nights, and winters are cold.

Climate data for Sarız (1991–2020)
Month	Jan	Feb	Mar	Apr	May	Jun	Jul	Aug	Sep	Oct	Nov	Dec	Year
Mean daily maximum °C (°F)	1.5 (34.7)	2.7 (36.9)	7.2 (45.0)	13.3 (55.9)	18.3 (64.9)	23.2 (73.8)	27.8 (82.0)	28.5 (83.3)	24.2 (75.6)	17.9 (64.2)	10.1 (50.2)	4.1 (39.4)	15.0 (59.0)
Daily mean °C (°F)	−4.0 (24.8)	−2.9 (26.8)	1.6 (34.9)	6.9 (44.4)	11.3 (52.3)	15.4 (59.7)	19.3 (66.7)	19.5 (67.1)	15.1 (59.2)	9.7 (49.5)	3.1 (37.6)	−1.7 (28.9)	7.8 (46.0)
Mean daily minimum °C (°F)	−8.8 (16.2)	−7.9 (17.8)	−3.3 (26.1)	0.9 (33.6)	4.3 (39.7)	7.0 (44.6)	9.5 (49.1)	9.7 (49.5)	5.9 (42.6)	2.4 (36.3)	−2.7 (27.1)	−6.5 (20.3)	0.9 (33.6)
Average precipitation mm (inches)	48.61 (1.91)	44.92 (1.77)	57.54 (2.27)	56.52 (2.23)	58.76 (2.31)	31.9 (1.26)	8.59 (0.34)	8.88 (0.35)	16.1 (0.63)	43.72 (1.72)	48.3 (1.90)	54.15 (2.13)	477.99 (18.82)
Average precipitation days (≥ 1.0 mm)	7.8	8.1	9.3	8.6	9.3	5.2	2.1	2.1	2.8	5.8	5.9	8.0	75.0
Average relative humidity (%)	70.2	69.1	65.9	61.5	61.4	56.4	48.7	49.0	51.7	60.8	64.8	70.3	60.9
Source: NOAA
