= Tomarza =

- District and municipality
- Map showing Tomarza District in Kayseri Province

- Location within Turkey Location within Turkey Central Anatolia
- Coordinates: 38°26′50″N 35°47′57″E
- Country: Turkey
- Province: Kayseri

Government
  - Mayor: Osman Koç (TOMARZA İTTİFAKI)
- Area: 1,405 km^{2} (542 sq mi)
- Elevation: 1,330 m (4,360 ft)
- Population (2022): 21,100
  - Density: 15.0/km^{2} (38.9/sq mi)
- Time zone: UTC+3 (TRT)
- Postal code: 38900
- Area code: 0352
- Website: www.tomarza.bel.tr

Tomarza, formerly known as Dumarza (Armenian: Դումարզա), is a municipality and district of Kayseri Province, Turkey. Its area is 1,405 km^{2}, and its population is 21,100 (2022). The mayor is Osman Koç (İYİP).

Tomarza is a famous city for its pumpkin seeds production. According to Gida Tarim, Tomarza is one of the important pumpkin seed production centers in Turkey. While 60 percent of the snack pumpkin seeds produced in Turkey are met by Kayseri, 25 percent of the production in Kayseri comes from the city of Tomarza. Pumpkin seeds will be planted on 40 thousand acres of land. In 2020, 5 thousand 500 tons of harvest were obtained from the pumpkin seeds for snacks planted on 40 thousand acres of land in Tomarza. Other important activities are potato production, and sheep, goat and cattle-raising.

== Composition ==
There are 54 neighbourhoods in Tomarza District:

- Akdere
- Akmezar
- Arslantaş
- Avşarsöğütlü
- Bektaş
- Böke
- Bostanlık
- Büyükcanlı
- Büyüksüvegen
- Çanakpınar
- Çayinli
- Cücün
- Çukurağaç
- Çulha
- Cumhuriyet
- Dadaloğlu
- Dağyurdu
- Ekinli
- Emiruşağı
- Göktepe
- Gülveren
- Güzelce
- Güzelsu
- Hacıpaşa
- İcadiye
- İmamkullu
- İncili
- Işıklar
- Kaleköy
- Kapıkaya
- Karamuklu
- Karaören
- Kesir
- Kevenağıl
- Kızılören
- Koçcagız
- Kömürköy
- Köprüköy
- Küçükcanlı
- Kurtuluş
- Melikören
- Pusatlı
- Sarımehmetli
- Şeyhbarak
- Şiraz
- Söğütlü
- Tahtakemer
- Tatarköy
- Toklar
- Turanlı
- Üçkonak
- Yavuz Selim
- Yeni
- Yeşilbağ

== Climate ==
Tomarza has a warm summer continental climate (Dfb) with cold winters and very warm, dry summers with cool nights. Rainfall occurs mostly during the spring and early summer.

Climate data for Tomarza, Kayseri province (1988-2012)
Month	Jan	Feb	Mar	Apr	May	Jun	Jul	Aug	Sep	Oct	Nov	Dec	Year
Mean daily maximum °C (°F)	1 (34)	3 (37)	8 (46)	15 (59)	19 (66)	23 (73)	27 (81)	28 (82)	24 (75)	18 (64)	10 (50)	4 (39)	15 (59)
Mean daily minimum °C (°F)	−9 (16)	−7 (19)	−3 (27)	1 (34)	4 (39)	7 (45)	9 (48)	9 (48)	5 (41)	2 (36)	−2 (28)	−5 (23)	1 (34)
Average precipitation mm (inches)	38 (1.5)	42 (1.7)	44 (1.7)	54 (2.1)	55 (2.2)	41 (1.6)	11 (0.4)	8 (0.3)	17 (0.7)	34 (1.3)	38 (1.5)	45 (1.8)	427 (16.8)
Source: Weather2
