= Sarıoğlan =

- District and municipality
- Map showing Sarıoğlan District in Kayseri Province

- Location in Turkey Sarıoğlan (Turkey Central Anatolia)
- Coordinates: 39°04′37″N 35°58′0″E
- Country: Turkey
- Province: Kayseri

Government
  - Mayor: Bekir Ayyıldırım (MHP)
- Area: 642 km^{2} (248 sq mi)
- Population (2022): 13,396
  - Density: 20.9/km^{2} (54.0/sq mi)
- Time zone: UTC+3 (TRT)
- Postal code: 38820
- Area code: 0352
- Website: www.sarioglan.bel.tr

Sarıoğlan is a municipality and district of Kayseri Province, Turkey. Its area is 642 km^{2}, and its population is 13,396 (2022). The mayor is Bekir Ayyıldırım (MHP).

== Composition ==
There are 28 neighbourhoods in Sarıoğlan District:

- Alamettin
- Bakarcak
- Burunören
- Çiftlik
- Düzencik
- Ebülhayır
- Gaziler
- Güzelyazı
- Hürriyet
- İğdeli
- Ilıca
- Kadılı
- Kaleköy
- Karaözü
- Karpınar
- Keklikoğlu
- Kızılpınar
- Muratbeyli
- Ömerhacılı
- Ömürlü
- Palas
- Şenyurt
- Sofumahmut
- TaTılı
- Üzerlik
- Yahyalı
- Yerlikuyu
- Yıldırım
