= Kocasinan =

- District and municipality
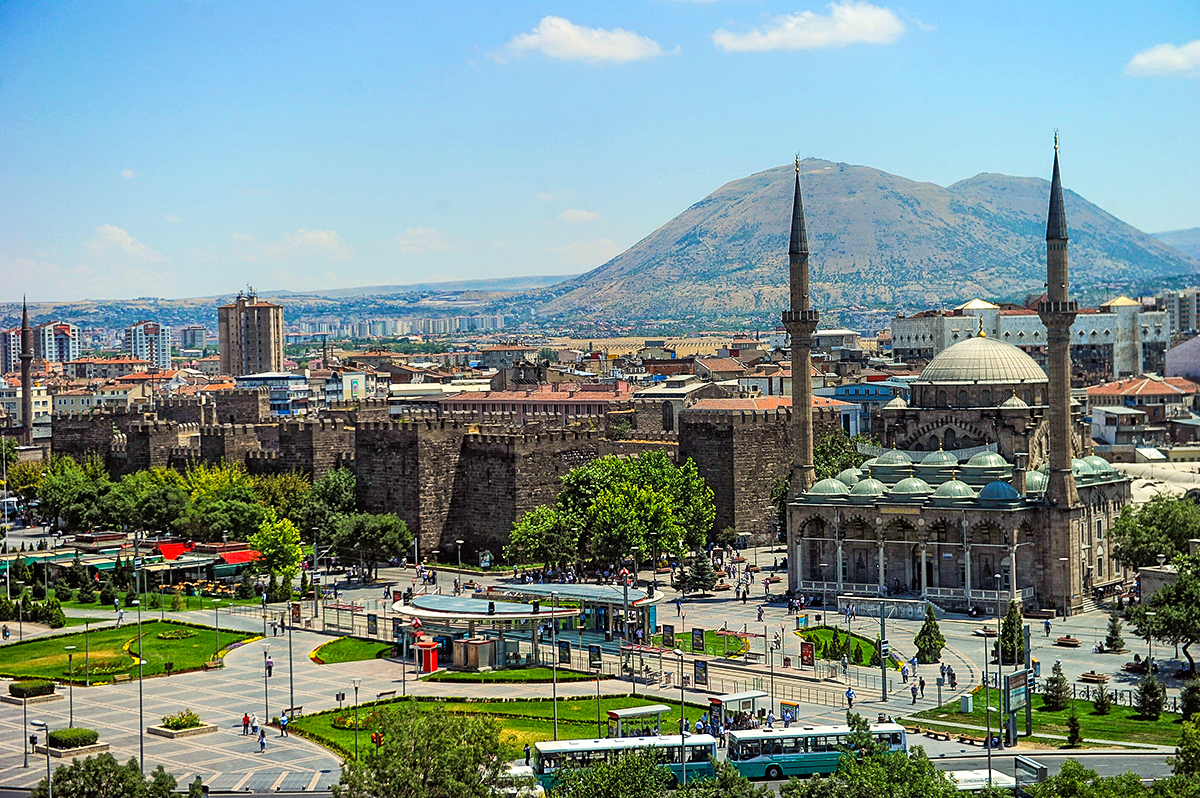
- Kayseri city center located in Kocasinan

- Logo

- Map showing Kocasinan District in Kayseri Province

- Location within Turkey Location within Turkey Central Anatolia
- Coordinates: 38°44′N 35°29′E
- Country: Turkey
- Province: Kayseri

Government
  - Mayor: Ahmet Çolakbayrakdar (AKP)
- Area: 1,471 km^{2} (568 sq mi)
- Population (2022): 409,005
  - Density: 278.0/km^{2} (720.1/sq mi)
- Time zone: UTC+3 (TRT)
- Area code: 0352
- Website: www.kocasinan.bel.tr

Kocasinan is a municipality and district of Kayseri Province, Turkey. Its area is 1,471 km^{2}, and its population is 409,005 (2022). It covers the northern part of the agglomeration of Kayseri and the adjacent countryside.

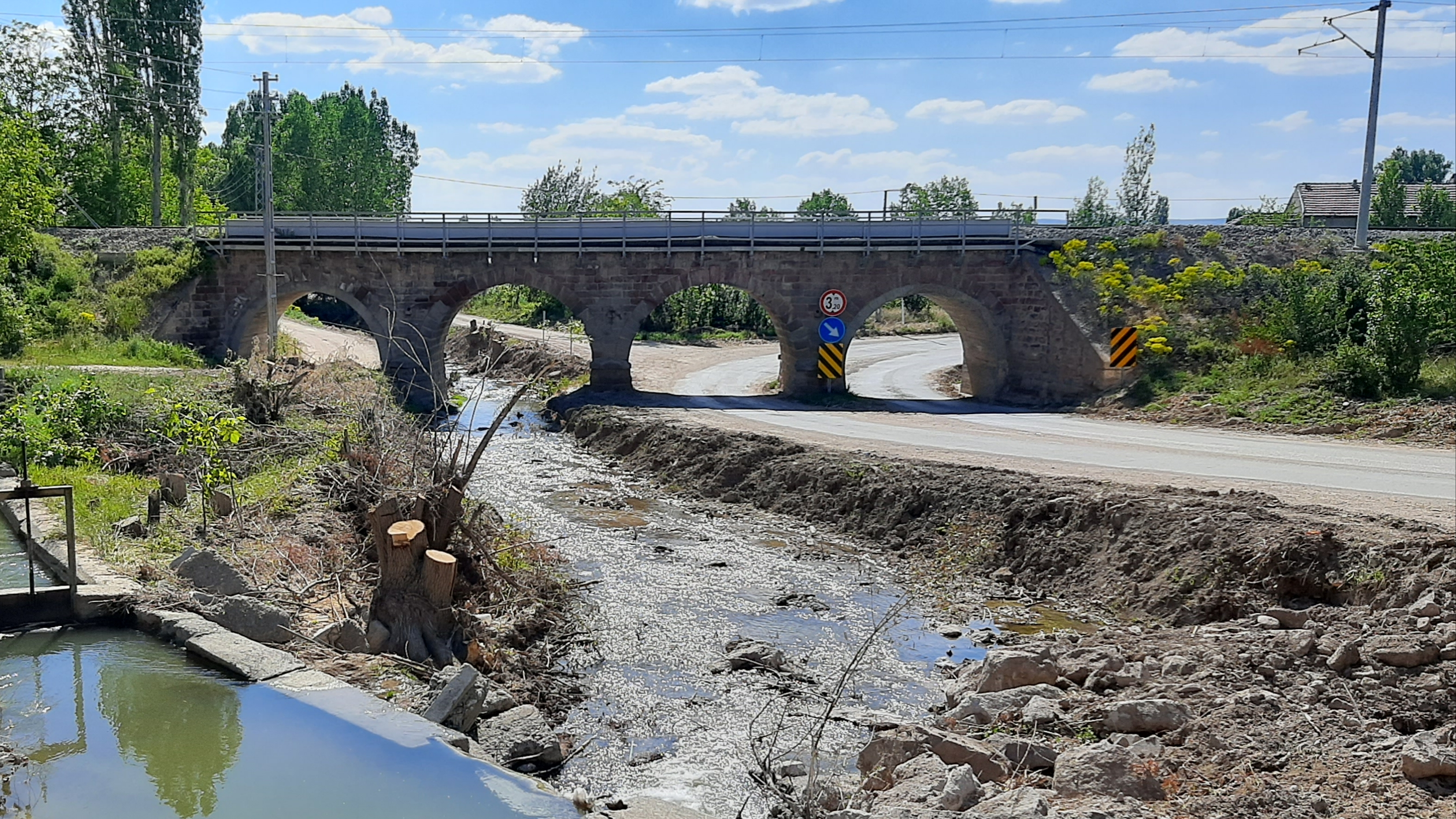
Gömeç köprüsü located in the town of Gömeç in Kocasinan

The name comes from Mimar Sinan, the Great, Ottoman architect. The mayor is Ahmet Çolakbayrakdar (AKP). The district Kocasinan was created in 1998 from part of the former central district of Kayseri, along with the district Melikgazi. At the 2013 Turkish local government reorganisation, the rural part of the district was integrated into the municipality, the villages becoming neighbourhoods.

== Composition ==
There are 93 neighbourhoods in Kocasinan District:

- Ahievren
- Akçatepe
- Akin
- Alsancak
- Amarat
- Argıncık
- Barbaros
- Barsama
- Bayramhacı
- Beyazşehir
- Beydeğirmeni
- Boğazköprü
- Boyacı
- Boztepe
- Buğdaylı
- Camiikebir
- Çevril
- Cırgalan
- Dadağı
- Doruklu
- Düver
- Ebiç
- Elagöz
- Elmalı
- Emmiler
- Erciyesevler
- Erkilet
- Ertuğrul Gazi
- Eskiömerler
- Eyim
- Fevziçakmak
- Fevzioğlu
- Generalemir
- Gevhernesibe
- Gömeç
- Güneşli
- Hacısaki
- Hasanarpa
- Hasancı
- Himmetdede
- Hırka
- Höbek
- Hoca Ahmet Yesevi
- Kalkancık
- Karahüyük
- Karakimse
- Kaş
- Kayabaşı
- Kemer
- Kızık
- Kocasinan
- Kuşcağız
- Kuşcu
- Mahzemin
- Mevlana
- Mimarsinan
- Mithatpaşa
- Mollahacı
- Molu
- Obruk
- Oruçreis
- Osmangazi
- Oymaağaç
- Sahabiye
- Salur
- Sanayi
- Sancaktepe
- Saraybosna
- Saraycık
- Şeker
- Seyrani
- Sümer
- Talatpaşa
- Taşhan
- Turgutreis
- Uğurevler
- Vatan
- Yakut
- Yavuz
- Yavuzselim
- Yazır
- Yemliha
- Yenidoğan
- Yenimahale
- Yenişehir
- Yeşil
- Yıldızevler
- Yukarıhasinli
- Yunusemre
- Yüreğil
- Yuvalı
- Ziyagökalp
- Zümrüt
