= Felahiye =

- District and municipality
- Map showing Felahiye District in Kayseri Province

- Location in Turkey Felahiye (Turkey Central Anatolia)
- Coordinates: 39°05′N 35°34′E
- Country: Turkey
- Province: Kayseri

Government
  - Mayor: Şeref Güleser (CHP)
- Area: 444 km^{2} (171 sq mi)
- Population (2022): 5,419
  - Density: 12/km^{2} (32/sq mi)
- Time zone: UTC+3 (TRT)
- Postal code: 38750
- Area code: 0352
- Website: www.felahiye.bel.tr

Felahiye is a municipality and district of Kayseri Province, Turkey. Its area is 444 km^{2}, and its population is 5,419 (2022). The mayor is Vural Coşkun (AKP)

== Composition ==
There are 19 neighbourhoods in Felahiye District:

- Acırlı
- Alparslan
- Beyler
- Büyüktoraman
- Büyüktoraman Hürriyet
- Büyüktoraman İstiklal
- Cumhuriyet
- Darılı
- İsabey
- Kale
- Karaşeyh
- Kayapınar
- Kayapınar Cumhuriyet
- Kayapınar Fatih Sultan Mehmet
- Kepiç
- Kuruhüyük
- Menteşe
- Silahtar
- Yeni
