= Kayseri Province =

Province of Turkey

Coordinates: 38°37′30″N 35°49′57″E

Kayseri Province Kayseri ili
- Province and metropolitan municipality
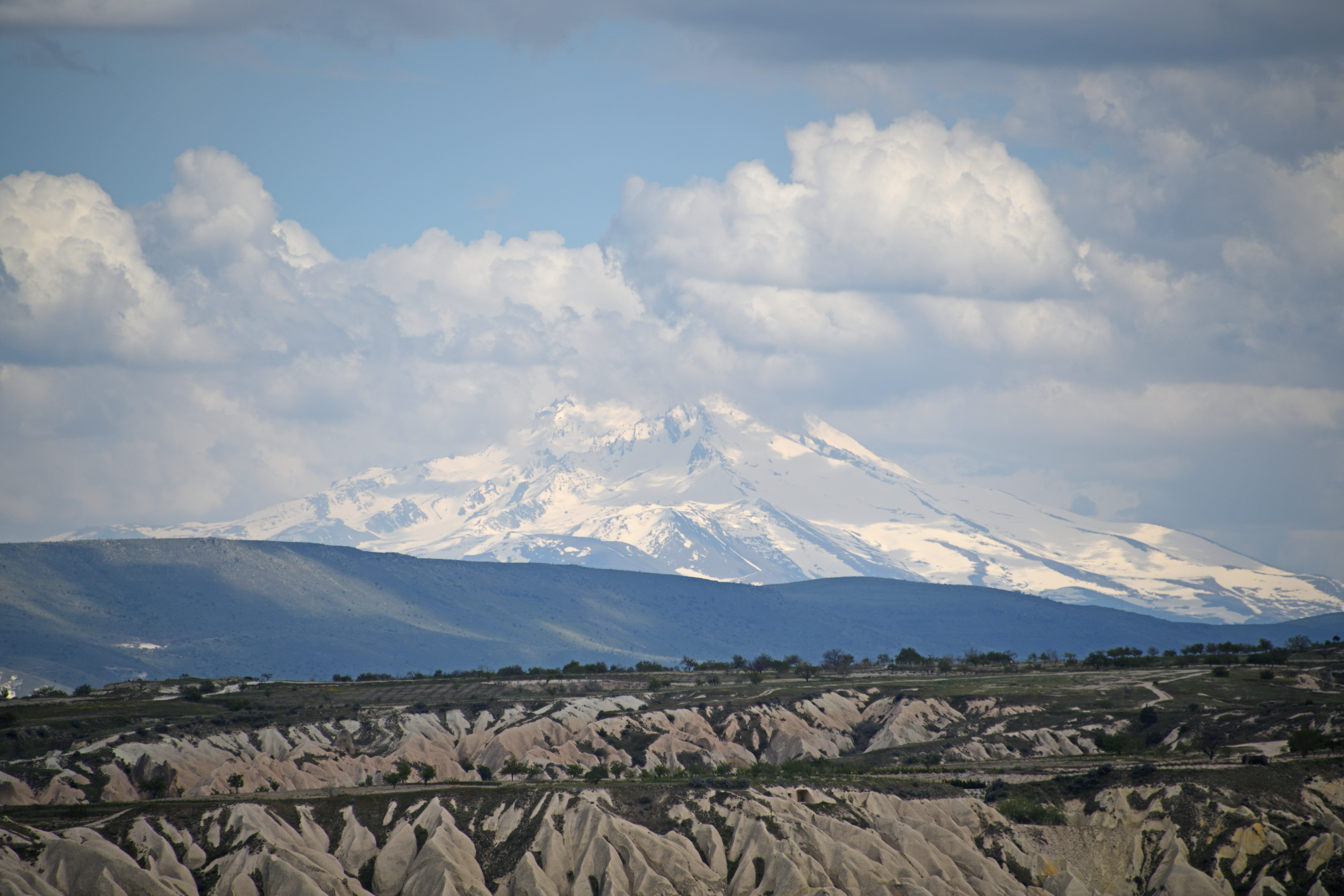
- Mount Erciyes

- Location of the province within Turkey
- Country: Turkey
- Seat: Kayseri

Government
  - Mayor: Memduh Büyükkılıç (AK Party)
  - Vali: Gökmen Çiçek
- Area: 16,970 km^{2} (6,550 sq mi)
- Population (2022): 1,441,523
  - Density: 84.95/km^{2} (220.0/sq mi)
- Time zone: UTC+3 (TRT)
- Area code: 0352
- Website: www.kayseri.bel.tr www.kayseri.gov.tr

Kayseri Province (Turkish: Kayseri ili) is a province and metropolitan municipality in central Turkey. Its area is 16,970 km^{2}, and its population is 1,441,523 (2022). It borders with Sivas, Adana, Niğde, Kahramanmaraş, Yozgat and Nevşehir provinces. Kayseri has been selected by TURKSOY as the Cultural Capital of the Turkic World for 2027.

The province is an area that has been linked with mythological stories as well as important figures in Turkish history. It is located in Anatolia, and surrounded by the Mount Erciyes, the Mount Hasan and the Mount Ali. The Ali mountain is named like that in honor of Ali Baba, who is said to have lived in the area. Locals claim that Kayseri is the most peaceful city in the world.

== Districts ==
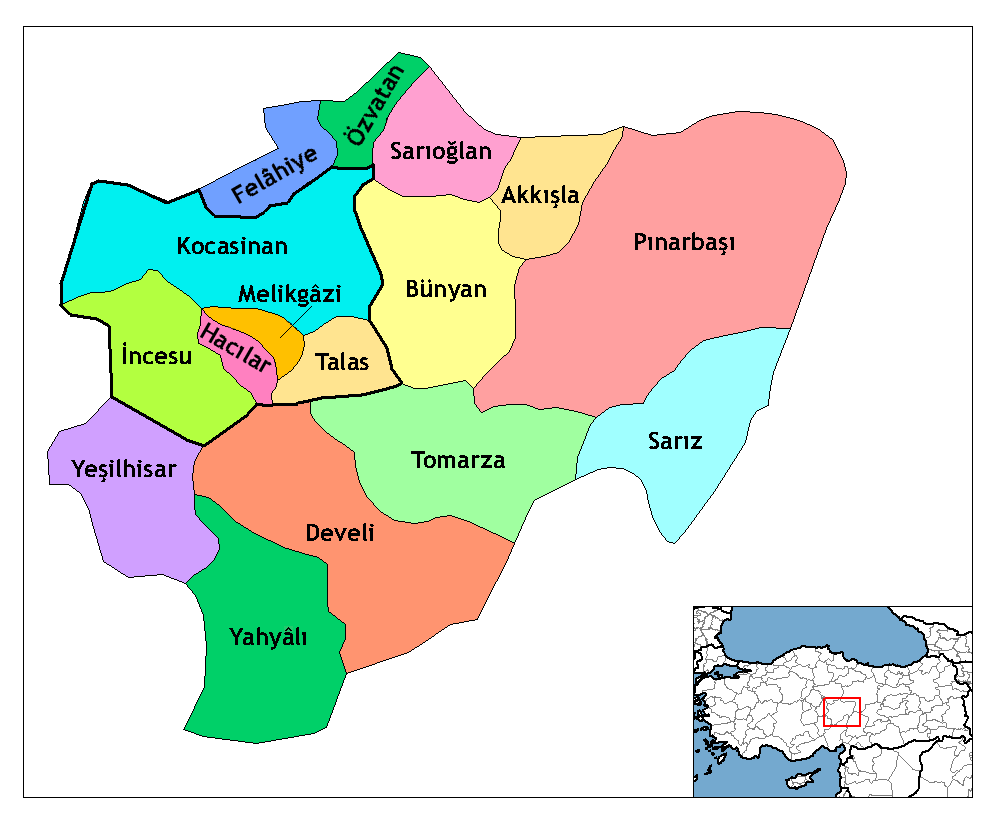
Districts of Kayseri Province

- Akkışla
- Bünyan
- Develi
- Felahiye
- Hacılar
- İncesu
- Kocasinan
- Melikgazi
- Özvatan
- Pınarbaşı
- Sarıoğlan
- Sarız
- Talas
- Tomarza
- Yahyalı
- Yeşilhisar

== History ==
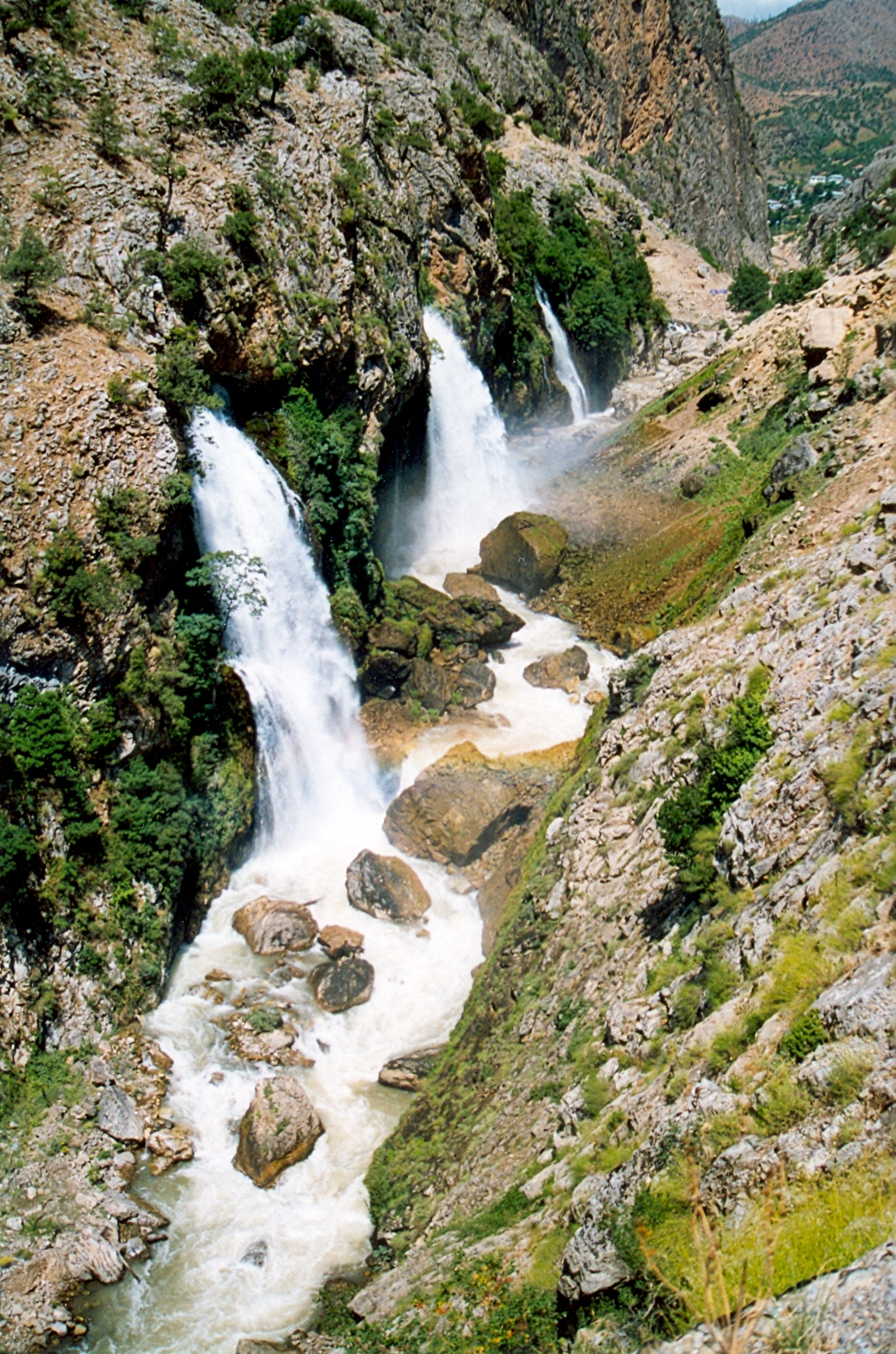
Waterfalls erupting from a cliff below Aladağlar.

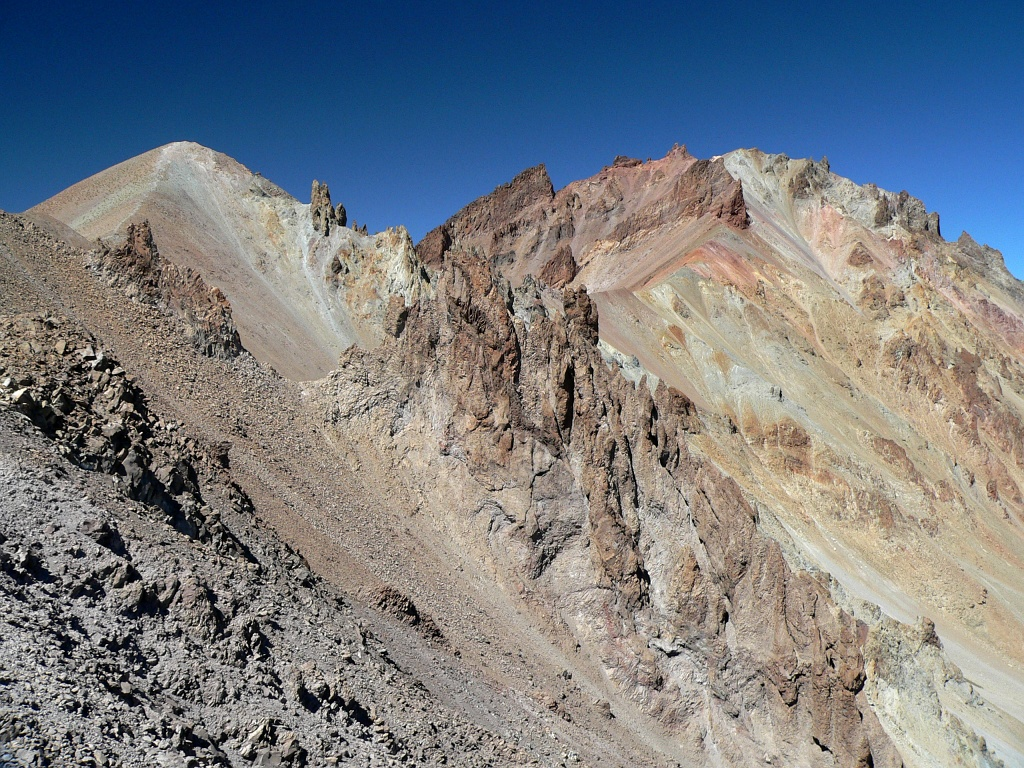
Mount Erciyes (Turkish: Erciyes Dağı), is located 25 km south of Kayseri. Highest mountain in central Anatolia (3916 metres), and has an extinct volcano located at its peak.

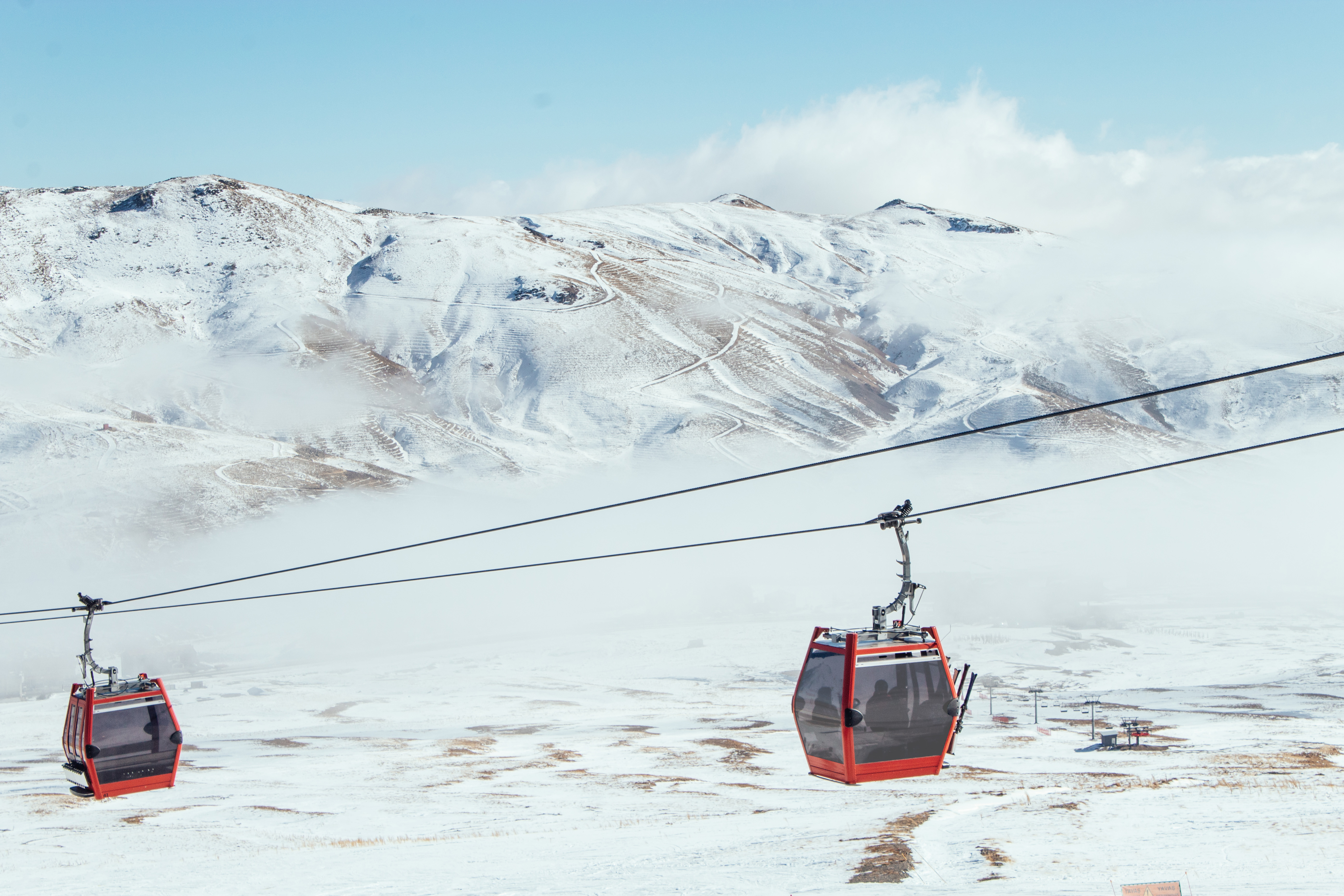
View from a cable car in Erciyes, Kayseri.

It was the residence of the Cappadocian kings and was sacked by Tigranes I, king of Armenia, in the 1st century BCE. Kayseri was first known as the city of Masaka. Later, during the Roman period, the province's name was changed to Caesarea, then Kayzer before becoming known with its modern name of Kayseri. Danishmend Gazi conquered Kayseri in 1084. The Seljuk Empire then modernised the province, with new buildings and mosques being built around. During this period, the Şifahane, Kayseri's first hospital, and perhaps the first hospital in all of Anatolia, was built. It was built in honor of Princess Gevher Nesibe Hatun, daughter of the Sultan. She died of a disease at a young age. Construction of the hospital was completed in 1206.

Later on, Kayseri became a cultural mecca of poets, artists in Turkey. Seyyid Burhaneddin lived there, and so did others such as Kadı Burhaneddin and Seyrani, among many others. Seynari was born in 1807. Sinan the Great, an Ottoman architect, was also from Kayseri.

According to Turkish mythology, a man named Hasan Baba would cross mountains during the month of August every year and bring Ali Baba snow, which would not melt.

The province roughly corresponds to the ancient region of Cappadocia.

== Modern Kayseri ==
Kayseri is nowadays a province filled with modern buildings and museums. Some of Turkey's most famous statues and monuments are located there. The modern city of Kayseri is in the Melikgazi district.

== Demographics ==
Sultan Abdulaziz accommodated the Kabardians (a Circassian tribe) in Uzunyayla (Kayseri). As a result, Kayseri has a significant Circassian population. In the 1965 census, 3.2% of the population reported Circassian as their first language. 23% of all Circassians in Turkey were in Kayseri.

== Transportation in Kayseri ==
Apart from taxi and bus transportation, Kayseri has a modern airport, Kayseri International Airport is served by 13 airlines, including Turkish Airlines and it has Kayseray which is the in-city rail system of main public transportation element in Kayseri.

== Gallery ==
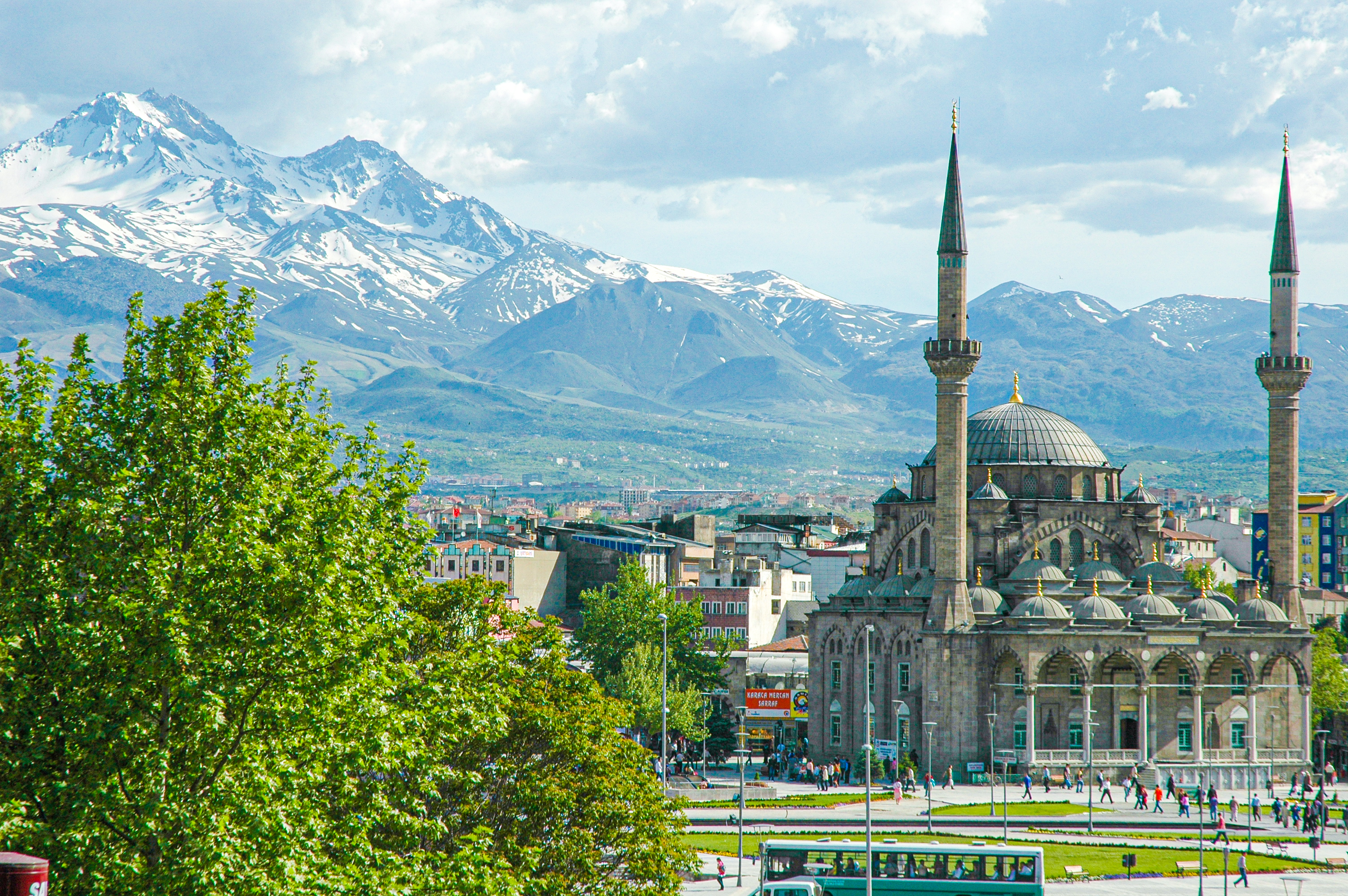
Mount Erciyes and the Bürüngüz mosque

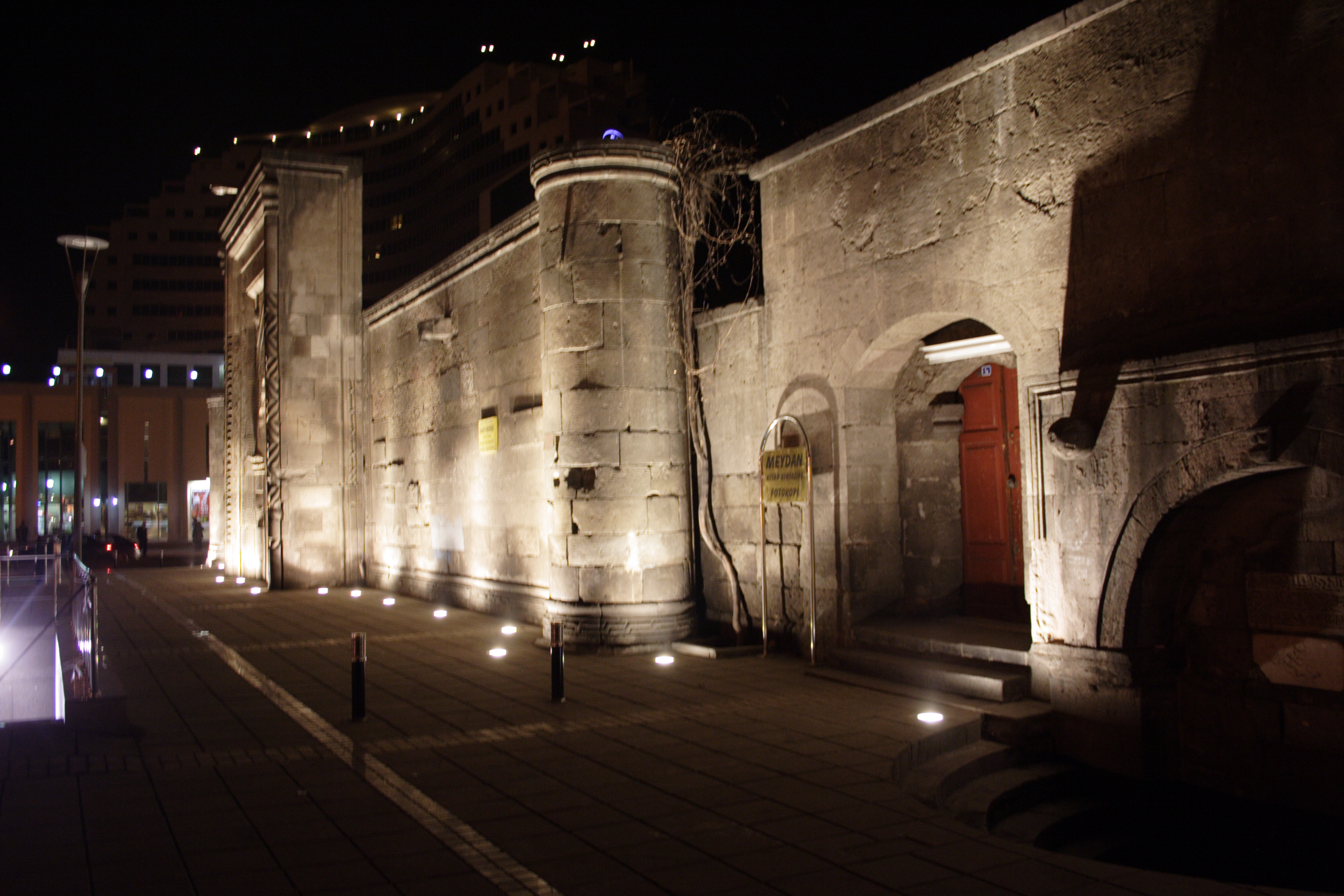
The madrasah of Sahabiye in Kayseri

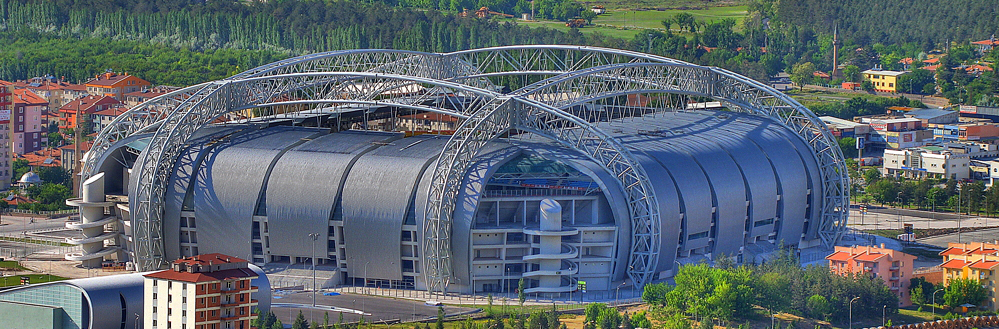
Kadir Has Stadium in Kayseri

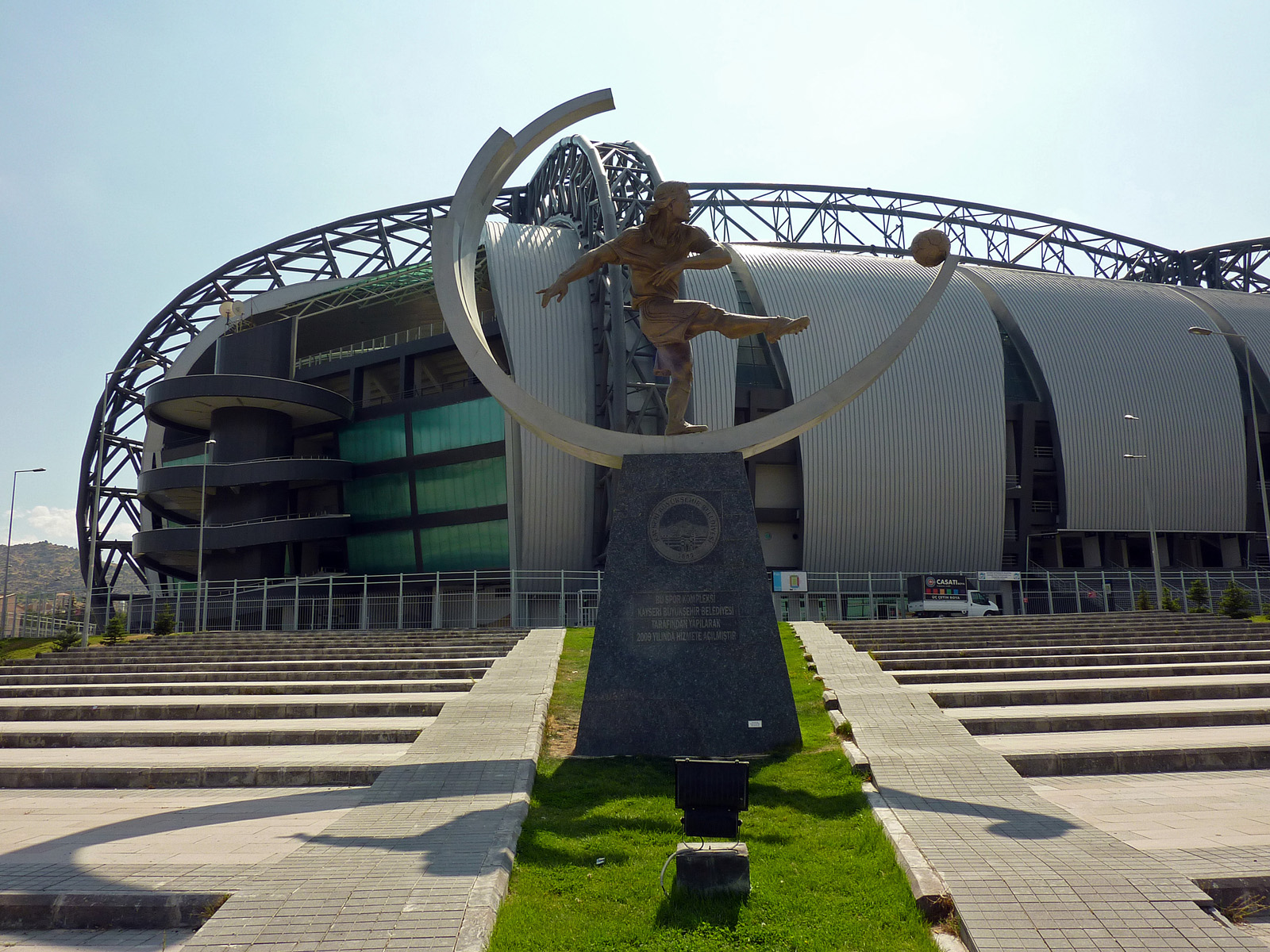
Kadir Has Stadium in Kayseri

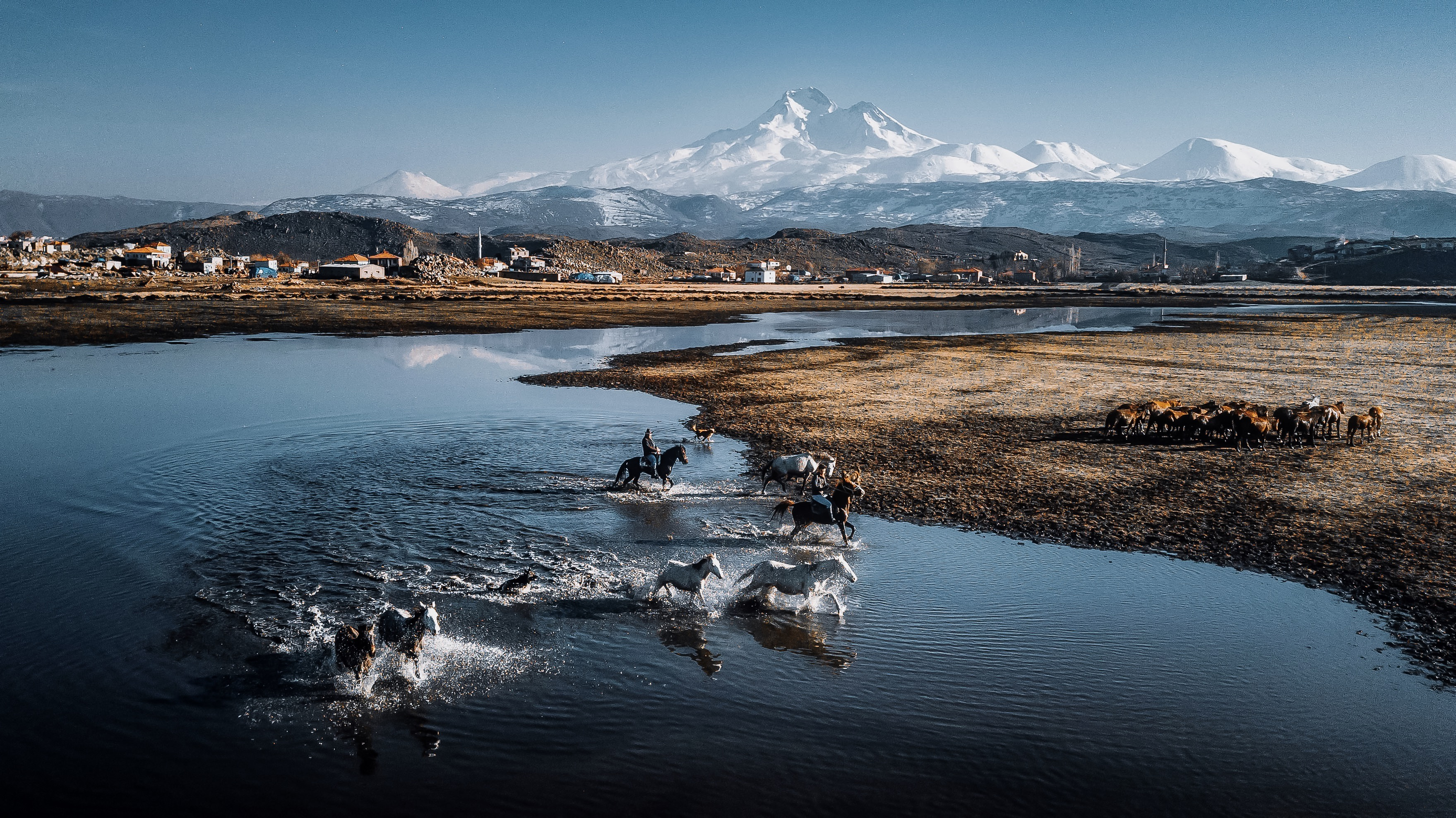
Erciyes Mountains
