= Uşak Museum of Archaeology =

Archaeological museum in Turkey

- Uşak Arkeoloji Müzesi
- Location of Uşak in Turkey
- Established: May 23, 1970; 56 years ago
- Location: Uşak, Turkey
- Coordinates: 38.67416°N 29.40326°E
- Type: Archaeology
- Collection size: 363 pieces of Karun Treasure and many other items from Bronze Age, Hellenistic and Ancient Roman Period.

The Uşak Museum of Archaeology (Turkish: Uşak Arkeoloji Müzesi) is an archaeological museum in Uşak in western Turkey. Founded on May 23, 1970, the museum is best known for its exhibitions of Karun treasure.

In the museum, items on display include sculptures, pitchers with beaklike spouts and stone axes from the Bronze Age, earthen dishes and glassware from the Hellenistic and Ancient Roman Period, and stelae from the nearby Roman ancient ruin site of Blaundus. The most interesting items are of the so-called Karun treasure belonging to the Lydian Period.

== Karun treasure ==
The artifacts, making a collection of 363 pieces, date back to the 7th century BCE. They were illegally excavated by villagers in 1966 from the tomb of a Lydian noble woman, smuggled outside the country and sold to the Metropolitan Museum of Art (The Met) in New York, USA. After their discovery in a catalogue of the museum in 1984, Turkish journalist Özgen Acar informed the Turkish government, which launched a judicial case against The Met. After a legal battle, the collection was returned in 1993 to Turkey.

== Museum theft case ==
In 2006 two items in the Karun Treasure (Lydian Hoard) were discovered to be fakes, with the originals having been stolen. The pieces were a coin and a golden brooch in the form of a hippocamp (a winged sea-horse). Kazım Akbıyıkoğlu, the director of the museum, was accused of the theft, and he and 10 others were arrested. Akbıyıkoğlu admitted guilt, blaming gambling debts. He was sentenced to 13 years in prison.

In November 2012, it was announced that the golden brooch would be returned to Turkey. The returned piece was temporarily displayed in Ankara's Museum of Anatolian Civilizations, before being returned to the Uşak Museum of Archaeology.
