= Bristol, Connecticut =

City in Connecticut, United States

- City
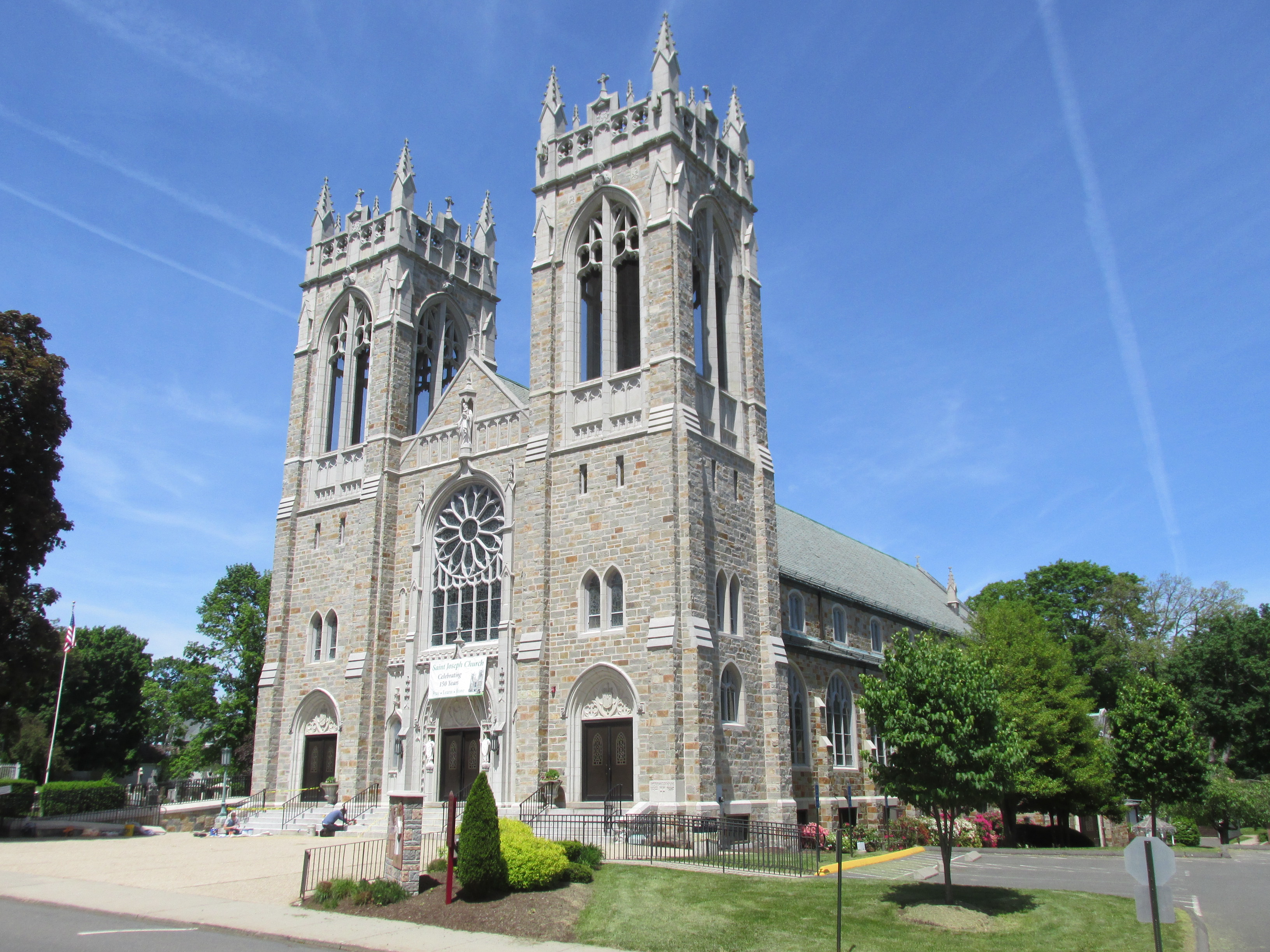
- St Joseph Church, Bristol CT

- Flag Seal
- Nicknames: Mum City, Home of ESPN, Bell City
- Interactive map of Bristol, Connecticut
- Coordinates: 41°40′52″N 72°56′26″W
- Country: United States
- State: Connecticut
- County: Hartford
- Region: Naugatuck Valley
- Incorporated (town): 1785; 241 years ago
- Incorporated (city): 1911; 115 years ago
- Neighborhoods: Cedar Lake; Chippens Hill; East Bristol; Edgewood; Federal Hill; Forestville Village; Maple End; Northeast Bristol; Rustic Terrace; West End

Government
  - Type: Mayor-council
  - Mayor: Ellen Zoppo-Sassu (D)

Area
  - Total: 26.81 sq mi (69.44 km^{2})
  - Land: 26.41 sq mi (68.39 km^{2})
  - Water: 0.41 sq mi (1.05 km^{2})
- Elevation: 420 ft (130 m)

Population (2024)
  - Total: 60,833
  - Density: 2,304/sq mi (889.5/km^{2})
- Time zone: UTC−5 (EST)
  - Summer (DST): UTC−4 (EDT)
- ZIP Codes: 06010–06011
- Area codes: 860/959
- FIPS code: 09-08420
- GNIS feature ID: 02378270
- Website: bristolct.gov

Bristol is a suburban city located in Hartford County, Connecticut, United States. The city is part of the Naugatuck Valley Planning Region. As of the 2020 census, the population of the city was 60,833.

Bristol is the location of the general headquarters of ESPN, the location of Lake Compounce, the United States's oldest continuously operating theme park, and is facing approval in 2024 to become home to one of the largest biomedical waste incineration operations in the United States.

Bristol was known as a clock-making city in the 19th century, and is the location of American Clock & Watch Museum. Bristol is also the site of the former American Silver Company and its predecessor companies.

Bristol's nickname is the "Mum City", because it was once a leader in chrysanthemum production and still holds an annual Bristol Mum Festival.

== History ==
The area that includes present-day Bristol was originally inhabited by the Tunxis Native American tribe, one of the Eastern Algonquian-speaking peoples that shared the lower Connecticut River Valley.

Originally, Bristol was within the boundaries of Farmington, Connecticut, which was incorporated in the Connecticut Colony in 1645. This deed was confirmed by another deed in 1650. The first actual settler of Bristol was Daniel Brownson, who built a house near West Street, but did not stay in the area very long. The first permanent settler was Ebenezer Barnes, who the next year built a home on King Street. Also in 1728, Nehemiah Manross arrived from Lebanon, Connecticut, and built a house north of Barnes Street, on the west side of King Street. The following year the first settlement arrived in what became East Bristol when Nathaniel Messenger of Hartford and Benjamin Buck of Southington bought land and built houses along King Street.

Other houses were soon built around present-day Bristol wherever land was available for farming. This included the slope of Fall Mountain, along today's Wolcott Street, and on Chippens Hill. By 1742, the families inhabiting the area petitioned the Connecticut Colony General Court for permission to create their own Congregational Society, citing the difficulties traveling to Farmington during winter. The Court approved their petition for the winter months only, and in 1744, agreed that area residents could set up their own ecclesiastical society. It was called New Cambridge. With their own congregation, area settlers began forming their own local government. However, since homes were so widely scattered, the General Court formed a committee to locate the geographic center of the settlement. The area now known as Federal Hill was deemed the center, and the first Congregationalist church was built there.

In 1785, New Cambridge was incorporated as the town of Bristol, named after Bristol, England. By 1790, the industry for which the town later became famous was established by the pioneer of clock making Gideon Roberts. Roberts began making wooden moment clocks and peddled them by horseback through Connecticut, New York and Pennsylvania. As Roberts' sons grew up and began helping with the business, Gideon increased production and Bristol clocks were soon sold all over the country. By the early 19th century, nearly all of the capital and skill in town was involved in the clock industry in some form or fashion. The clock business gave way to related industries, which included brass, springs, bearings, and hardware. As Bristol began to grow, many ethnic groups arrived to work in the industries.

It was incorporated as a city in 1911. Today, Bristol is mostly residential and best known as the home of ESPN (which arrived in 1979), the American Clock & Watch Museum (since 1952), and Lake Compounce, America's oldest operating theme park—opened in 1846.

=== Blight Committee ===
In the 1990s, the Blight Committee was formed to enforce appearance laws, and even demolish properties which it deems are unsightly and unkempt. This committee is tasked with ensuring that properties are not abandoned and that all properties are reasonably maintained.

In 2008, the Bristol Blight Committee was disbanded in order to make way for a new committee, the Bristol Code Enforcement Committee. This new committee has even greater powers and can now deal with both appearances and structural integrity issues of buildings in Bristol. The purpose of the committee is to streamline the process of enforcing the issues the former Blight Committee was tasked with. The law requires all structures to be free of "abandoned vehicles, nuisances, refuse, pollution and filth ... broken glass, loose shingles, holes, cracked or damaged siding, crumbling brick and other conditions 'reflective of deterioration or inadequate maintenance.'"

=== Downtown revitalization ===
Since 2008, Bristol has begun another renovation of the downtown area. The Bristol Downtown Development Corporation was formed to manage the downtown renovation. This has included a complete overhaul of a park in the center of the city. In addition, the outdated and underused Bristol Centre Mall from the mid-1960s was purchased by the city, then demolished in 2008, yielding a 17-acre site suitable for development, christened Depot Square by the city. Also, North Main Street was improved in 2008 by adding islands in the road, elegant street lighting and a brick median when the road was repaved.

== Geography ==
According to the United States Census Bureau, Bristol has a total area of 26.8 square miles (69.5 km^{2}), of which 26.4 square miles (68.4 km^{2}) is land and 0.39 square miles (1.0 km^{2}), or 1.51%, is water. Bristol contains several distinct sections, including Cedar Lake in the southwestern quarter, Chippens Hill in the northwestern quarter, Edgewood in the northeastern quarter, Forestville in the southeastern quarter and the city in the approximate middle of Bristol. The majority of Bristol's area is residential in character, though since 2008 there has been a push for commercial development in the city. The city is part of the Naugatuck Valley Regional Planning Organization following the closure of the Central Connecticut Regional Planning Agency, the metropolitan planning organization for Bristol, New Britain, and surrounding towns for decades.

Forestville was the hunting grounds of the Tunxis tribe until the 19th century. The village was established in 1833 and named Forestville for its wooded surroundings. Forestville today has grown into a mini-metropolis of suburban neighborhoods and local businesses. The boundaries of Forestville go from the Plainville town line, south to the Southington town line, west up to the industrial development along Middle street and crosses King Street, including properties on Kingswood Drive and Bernside Drive, north up to Bristol Eastern High School, then north up to the south edge of properties on Louisiana Avenue, then to the west of properties on the west side of Brook Street and from there, goes up to commercial development along Farmington Avenue. Within the Forestville area, there are two subsections known as East Bristol and the Stafford District. Forestville village has a library branch (Manross), post office, meeting hall, community group (Forestville Village Association), fire station, cemetery, funeral home, two urban parks (Quinlan Veterans Park and Clock Tower Park), Pequabuck Duck Race, Memorial Day Parade, Summer Concert Night, Pumpkin Festival, and a railroad station (no longer in use). At one time all of Forestville had its own zip code.

== Demographics ==
Historical population
Census	Pop.	Note	%±
1790	2,462		—
1800	2,722		10.6%
1810	1,428		−47.5%
1820	1,362		−4.6%
1830	1,707		25.3%
1840	2,109		23.6%
1850	2,884		36.7%
1860	3,436		19.1%
1870	3,788		10.2%
1880	5,347		41.2%
1890	7,382		38.1%
1900	6,268		−15.1%
1910	9,527		52.0%
1920	20,620		116.4%
1930	28,451		38.0%
1940	30,167		6.0%
1950	35,961		19.2%
1960	45,499		26.5%
1970	55,487		22.0%
1980	57,370		3.4%
1990	60,640		5.7%
2000	60,062		−1.0%
2010	60,477		0.7%
2020	60,833		0.6%
U.S. Decennial Census

=== 2020 census ===
As of the 2020 census, Bristol had a population of 60,833. The median age was 41.4 years. 19.8% of residents were under the age of 18 and 18.2% of residents were 65 years of age or older. For every 100 females there were 92.3 males, and for every 100 females age 18 and over there were 89.6 males age 18 and over.

99.9% of residents lived in urban areas, while 0.1% lived in rural areas.

There were 25,721 households in Bristol, of which 26.5% had children under the age of 18 living in them. Of all households, 40.5% were married-couple households, 19.8% were households with a male householder and no spouse or partner present, and 31.1% were households with a female householder and no spouse or partner present. About 31.9% of all households were made up of individuals and 12.9% had someone living alone who was 65 years of age or older.

There were 27,251 housing units, of which 5.6% were vacant. The homeowner vacancy rate was 1.5% and the rental vacancy rate was 5.6%.

Racial composition as of the 2020 census
Race	Number	Percent
White	45,734	75.2%
Black or African American	3,579	5.9%
American Indian and Alaska Native	162	0.3%
Asian	1,577	2.6%
Native Hawaiian and Other Pacific Islander	15	0.0%
Some other race	3,906	6.4%
Two or more races	5,860	9.6%
Hispanic or Latino (of any race)	9,935	16.3%

=== 2010 census ===
As of the 2010 census, there were 60,477 people, 25,189 households, and 16,175 families residing in the city. The population density was 2,265.8 inhabitants per square mile (874.8/km^{2}). There were 26,125 housing units at an average density of 985.6 units per square mile (380.5 units/km^{2}). The racial makeup of the city was 87.74% White, 3.84% African American, 9.64% Hispanic, 0.19% Native American, 1.94% Asian, 0.02% Pacific Islander, 3.72% from other races, and 2.54% from two or more races.

The median income for a household in the city in 2010 was $57,610. The per capita income for the city was $30,573. Of the population 10.5% was living below the poverty line. Out of the total population, 8.7% of those under the age of 18 and 5.9% of those 65 and older were living below the poverty line.

=== 2000 census ===
In 2000 there were 24,886 households in Bristol, of which 29.6% had children under the age of 18 living with them, 49.6% were married couples living together, 11.5% had a female householder with no husband present, and 35.0% were non-families. Of all households 28.9% were made up of individuals, and 10.7% consisted of a sole resident who was 65 years of age or older. The average household size was 2.38, and the average family size was 2.94.

The age diversity at the 2000 census was 23.2% under the age of 18, 7.2% from 18 to 24, 32.5% from 25 to 44, 22.2% from 45 to 64, and 14.9% who were 65 years of age or older. The median age was 38 years. For every 100 females, there were 93.6 males. For every 100 females age 18 and over, there were 90.6 males.

== Economy ==
=== Notable companies ===
The companies below are some of the most notable in Bristol. These, in addition to Bristol Hospital, are the largest private employers in the area.

==== Associated Spring ====
Founded in 1857 and headquartered in Bristol, Barnes Group is a diversified international manufacturer of precision metal components and assemblies and a distributor of industrial supplies, serving a wide range of markets and customers. Barnes Group consists of three businesses with 2005 sales of $1.1 billion.

==== ESPN ====
ESPN houses its broadcast studios in Bristol on Middle Street. ESPN is the largest taxpayer to the City of Bristol.

==== Otis Elevator company ====
Though its beginnings were in Yonkers, New York, Otis Elevator Company possesses the tallest elevator test tower in the United States in Bristol. Located near ESPN and Lake Compounce, the 383-foot (117 m)-high tower is easily visible from the surrounding roads.

=== Top employers ===
According to Bristol's 2024 Comprehensive Annual Financial Report, the top employers in the city were:

#	Employer	# of Employees
1	ESPN	4,100
2	City of Bristol & Board of Education	1,714
3	Bristol Health	1,100
4	Amazon	350
5	IDEX Health & Science LLC	175
6	Stop & Shop	150
7	Quality Coils	125
8	The Pines at Bristol	115
9	Sheriden Woods Health Care Center	100
10	Stephen AutoMall Centre	

== Arts and culture ==
Bristol holds an annual street festival in September with a car show and a family farms weekend at Minors Farm, Shepherd Meadows and Roberts Orchard.

=== Mum Festival and parade ===
The first Bristol Mum Festival began on July 7, 1962, and included a parade. The members of the Chamber of Commerce and City of Bristol officials met and completed a list of activities to take place over six days. They wanted to focus on the positive things that were occurring in Bristol. When the festival opened it was originally known as the "Fall Festival". In 1963 the chrysanthemum ("Mum") was also added to the festival's name. Prior to 1986 the nurseries in Bristol would produce over 80,000 mum plants. In 2014, city leaders elected to adopt a new "brand" for the city. "All Heart" became the new logo on letterheads and T-shirts and even the "Mum Festival" leaders were "encouraged" to adopt the new image at the festival and parade.

=== Other attractions ===
Located in Bristol are the American Clock & Watch Museum, Imagine Nation, A Museum Early Learning Center, Bristol Military Memorial Museum, Bristol Historical Society Museum, Witch's Dungeon Classic Movie Museum, and the Harry Barnes Memorial Nature Center which is part of the Environmental Learning Centers of Connecticut. There is also a Polish-American Dożynki festival every September, at St Stanislaus Church.

== Sports ==
Bristol has a summer collegiate baseball team called the Bristol Blues who play home games at Muzzy Field.

Muzzy Field is one of the oldest ballparks in the United States. In 2012 and 2013, the City of Bristol approved funding for a significant renovation project of the historic ballpark.

Bristol hosts the Little League New England and Mid-Atlantic Regional playoffs every August at the A. Bartlett Giamatti Little League Center. Bristol is also the hometown of Aaron Hernandez.

== Parks and recreation ==
Parks in Bristol include Peck, Page, Rockwell, Bracket, Barnes Nature Center, Indian Rock, and Forestville Memorial. The city is also home to Lake Compounce (1846), the oldest continuously operated amusement park in North America, and to the New England Carousel Museum.

== Government ==
Bristol city vote by party in presidential elections
Year	Democratic	Republican	Third Parties
2024	49.2% 14,125	49.5% 14,218	
2020	51.89% 15,463	46.42% 13,834	1.69% 503
2016	47.25% 12,499	48.20% 12,752	4.55% 1,204
2012	57.91% 14,146	40.95% 10,004	1.14% 279
2008	60.10% 15,966	38.41% 10,203	1.49% 397
2004	56.34% 14,201	42.13% 10,619	1.53% 386
2000	61.81% 14,665	33.50% 7,948	4.69% 1,112
1996	57.59% 13,616	27.74% 6,560	14.67% 3,468
1992	41.99% 11,872	29.73% 8,407	28.28% 7,995
1988	54.39% 13,462	44.58% 11,034	1.03% 256
1984	43.53% 10,782	56.00% 13,872	0.47% 116
1980	46.32% 11,123	39.91% 9,583	13.77% 3,306
1976	54.07% 13,330	45.23% 11,151	0.70% 173
1972	46.92% 11,609	52.19% 12,913	0.89% 219
1968	57.59% 12,316	37.66% 8,053	4.76% 1,017
1964	76.13% 15,600	23.87% 4,892	0.00% 0
1960	62.82% 13,365	37.18% 7,909	0.00% 0
1956	39.28% 7,602	60.72% 11,751	0.00% 0

Voter Registration and Party Enrollment as of October 29, 2019
Party	Active Voters	Inactive Voters	Total Voters	Percentage
Democratic	12,731	652	13,383	35.58%
Republican	7,309	346	7,655	20.35%
Unaffiliated	14,900	998	15,898	42.26%
Minor parties	627	54	681	1.81%
Total	35,567	2,050	37,617	100%

The city is governed under a Mayor-council form of government. Both the mayor and councilpersons are elected every two years. The city's Treasurer, Board of Assessment Appeals, and Board of Education are also elected every two years. Democrat and former Bristol mayor Ellen Zoppo-Sassu won the mayoral race by less than 200 votes Tuesday, November 4, ousting Republican Mayor Jeff Caggiano from office.

The City Council is made up of six members, elected every two years from three two member districts. As of the 2021 municipal elections, the members of the city council are:

- District 1: Erick Rosengren(R) and Greg Hahn(D)
- District 2: Susan Tyler(R) and Peter Kelly(D)
- District 3: Steven Seymour(D) and Mark Dickau(D)

Bristol is represented in the Connecticut House of Representatives by state representatives Cara Pavalock D'Amato (R-77), Whit Betts (R-78), and Chris Ziogas (D-79). State Senator Henri Martin (R-31) represents Bristol in the Connecticut Senate. At the federal level, Bristol is in Connecticut's 1st congressional district and is currently represented by Democrat John B. Larson.

== Education ==
Education in Bristol is conducted using seven elementary schools (grades kindergarten through five), two middle schools (grades six, seven and eight), and two high schools. In addition to these public schools, there are three private Catholic Schools, and one Lutheran School available. These add an additional three pre-kindergarten through grade 8 schools and one additional high school.

A recent press release shows good scores on the Connecticut Academic Performance Test, a standardized test which students take statewide in tenth grade. The report states that more than 87% of Bristol students scored at or above the proficient level in each of the content areas assessed.

Schools in Bristol
Elementary schools	Middle schools	K-through-8 schools	High schools
Bingham School (closed June 2010)	Chippens Hill Middle School	Saint Anthony School (Closed June 2016)	Bristol Central High School
Edgewood School (Closed June 2023)	Memorial Boulevard Middle School (Closed June 2012)	Saint Matthew School	Bristol Eastern High School
Greene-Hills School	Northeast Middle School	Saint Joseph School	St. Paul Catholic High School
Hubbell School		Immanuel Lutheran School	
Ivy Drive School			
Jennings School (closed June 2012)			
Mountain View School			
O'Connell School (closed June 2012)			
South Side School			
Stafford School			
West Bristol School			

Recently, it has been proposed that the educational system of the city be redesigned. Because some of the schools are in historic buildings, new schools are being sought by the city. In addition, it has been proposed that the entire education system of the city be redesigned, eliminating the middle school category. In other words, all schools would be kindergarten through eighth grade or high school. The Bristol Board of Education's appeals for support for this project have been met with mixed emotions.

== Media ==
The local daily newspaper is The Bristol Press, and town news is also featured in a small weekly called the Bristol Observer.

== Infrastructure ==
=== Transportation ===
==== Bus ====
Bristol has a bus service that connects urban centers and hospitals with the rest of the city. It is part of the CTtransit system, which serves the Greater Hartford area.

=== Public safety ===
==== EMS ====
Bristol's emergency medical services program has been provided by Bristol Hospital since 1977. It was designed to assume the responsibility previously carried by the Bristol Police Department. The Bristol Hospital's EMS are carried out using six emergency ambulances (including spares), two paramedic intercept vehicles and four wheelchair vans.

==== Fire department ====
The Bristol, Connecticut Fire Department is a full-service fire department with five engine companies (or stations) and one tower ladder company. The Bristol Board of Fire Commissioners consists of five members appointed by the Mayor who establish the primary policies of the fire department.

==== Police department ====
The Bristol Police Department is a full-service police department with approximately 125 sworn officers. The Bristol Board of Police Commissioners consists of five members appointed by the Mayor who establish the primary policies of the police department. In addition to a vehicular patrol division, downtown Bristol is also policed by a bicycle division. During any shift, there may be as many as 12 officers on duty, not including detectives and officers from other divisions.

== Notable people ==
- Amos Bronson Alcott (1799–1888), father of Louisa May Alcott, taught school in Bristol on two different occasions: in 1823 and, after teaching in Cheshire for a time, again in Bristol from 1827 to 1828. Alcott later moved to Concord, Massachusetts, where he became acquainted with many prominent Transcendentalists and literary figures
- John R. Broderick (born 1957), President of Old Dominion University in Norfolk, Virginia, was born in Bristol
- Gary Burghoff (born 1943), actor who played the character Corporal Walter "Radar" O'Reilly in both the film and television series M*A*S*H, was born in Bristol
- Donovan Clingan (born 2004), professional basketball player for the Portland Trail Blazers of the National Basketball Association (NBA)
- Bob Crane (1928–1978), actor who played the title role in the television series Hogan's Heroes, worked for WBIS radio station in Bristol early in his career
- Chris Denorfia, former Major League Baseball outfielder, was born in Bristol
- Frank Filipetti, music producer, was born in Bristol
- Amethyst, drag queen; grew up in Bristol
- Michelle Guerette (born 1980), Olympic athlete, graduated from Bristol Central High School
- Aaron Hernandez (1989–2017), NFL former tight end for the New England Patriots and convicted murderer
- Gordon J. Humphrey (born 1940), U.S. Senator from New Hampshire (1979–1991) was born in Bristol
- Cliff Johnson, author of The Fool's Errand, was born in Bristol
- Karen Josephson (born 1964) and Sarah Josephson (born 1964), twin sisters who won the silver medal in synchronized swimming at the 1988 Summer Olympics in Seoul, South Korea and the gold medal at the 1992 Summer Olympics in Barcelona, Spain, were born in Bristol
- Jocelin Donahue (born 1981), actress most famous for her role in Ti West's critically acclaimed horror film The House of the Devil, born and raised in Bristol
- Fred Lynn, debuted in his professional baseball career playing for the Bristol Red Sox at Muzzy Field, an early twentieth-century ballpark in Bristol. Baseball Hall of Famer Jim Rice, who debuted with Williamsport in the New York-Penn League and then played for Winter Haven of the Florida State League, also played part of his minor league career for the Bristol Red Sox
- Scott Perkins (born 1980), American composer, was raised in Bristol and graduated from Bristol Central High School
- Steve Pikiell (born 1967), head basketball coach at Rutgers University; formerly coach at Stony Brook University
- Mike Reiss (born 1959), longtime writer for The Simpsons, is a Bristol native
- Albert Rockwell (1862–1925) inventor, manufacturer, industrialist, and philanthropist who moved to Bristol in the 1880s. He designed and manufactured doorbells and other kinds of bells (hence the name Bell City), bicycle brakes, ball bearings, and automobiles
- Katharine Shepard (1905–1986), archaeologist, art historian
- Tom Shopay (born 1945) outfielder with the New York Yankees and Baltimore Orioles 1967-1977
- Michelle Theriault (born 1986), stock car racing driver, was born in Bristol
- Adrian Wojnarowski, New York Times best-selling author and NBA Columnist for Yahoo! Sports, Fox Sports One, and now ESPN was raised in Bristol and attended Bristol Central High School

== Sister City ==
- Kozani, Greece

== Gallery ==
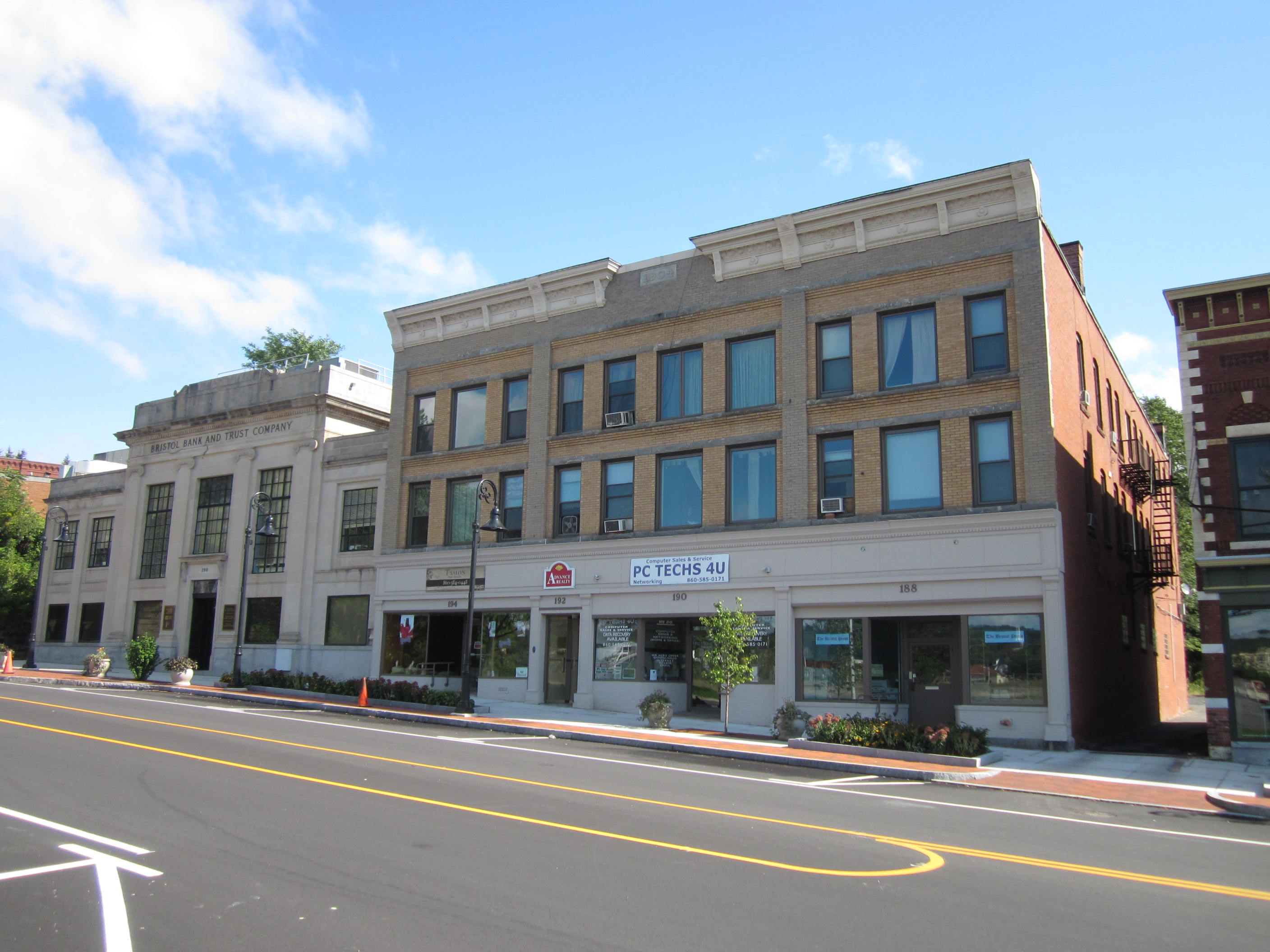
Main Street Historic District

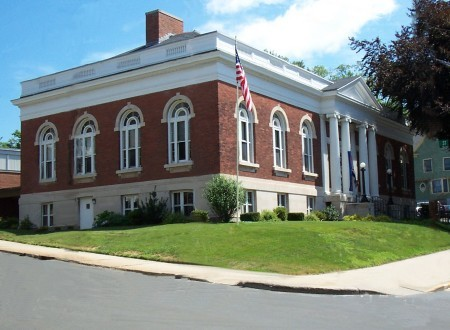
Main Library

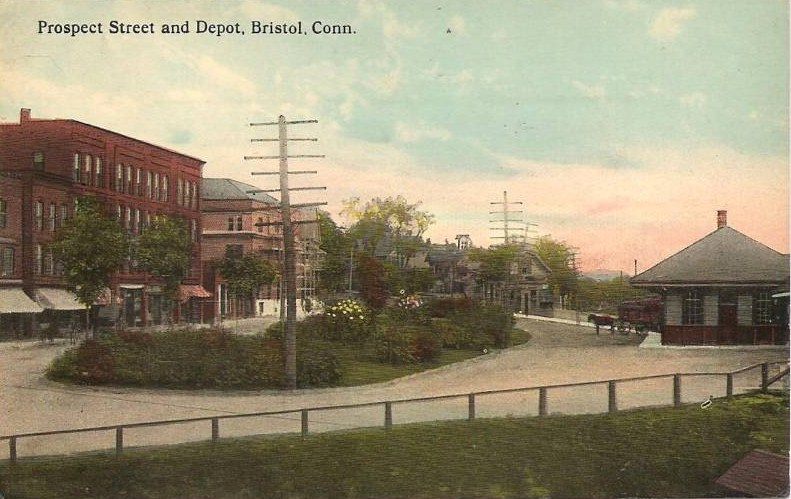
Railroad station and Prospect Street, c. 1913

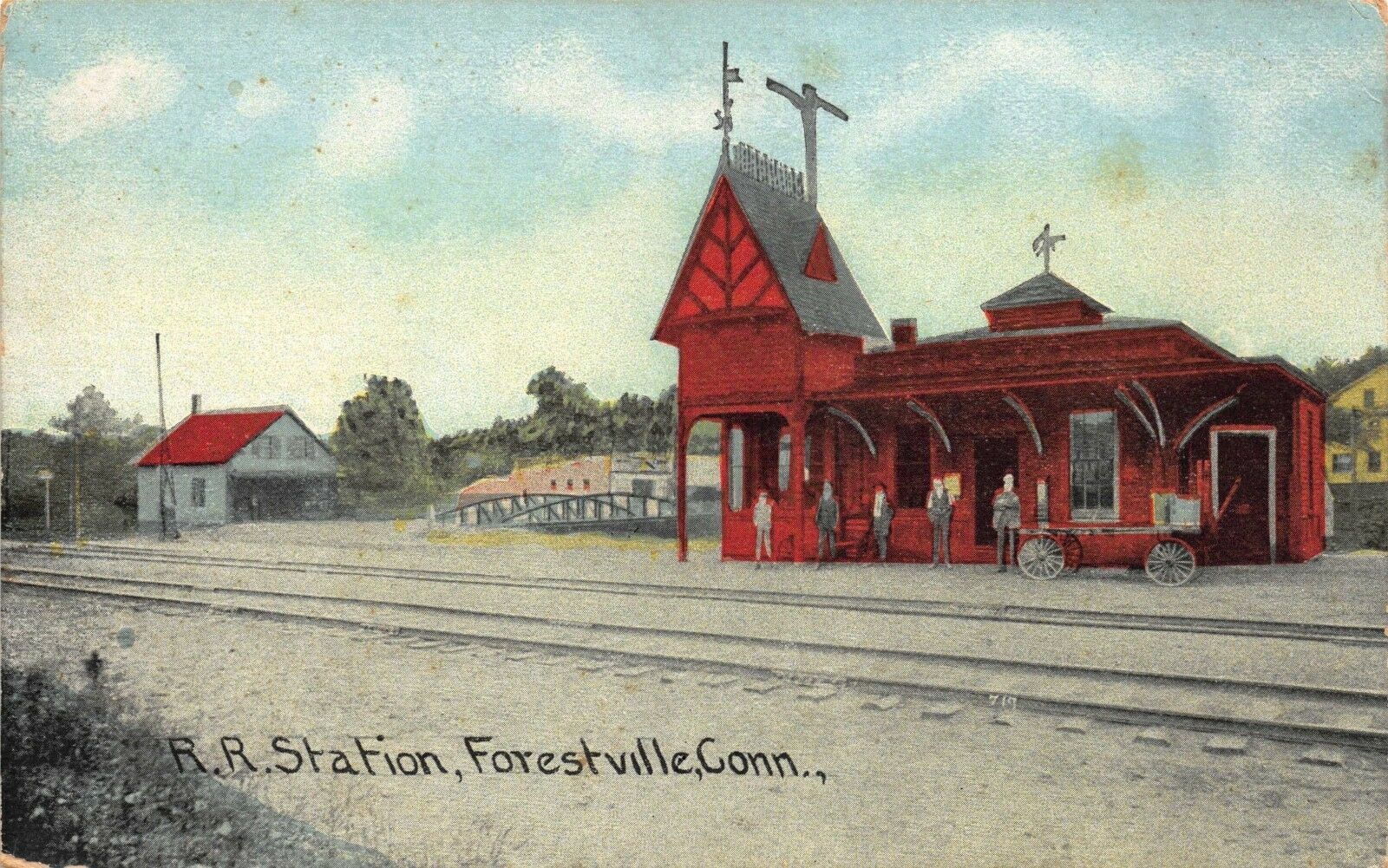
Forestville railroad station, c. 1912

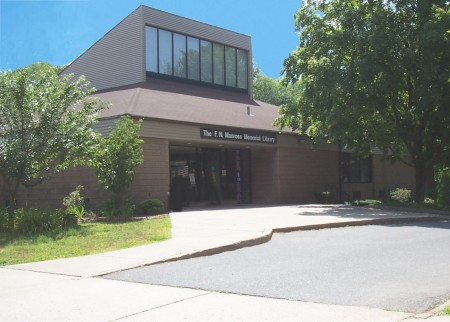
Manross Library, center of Forestville

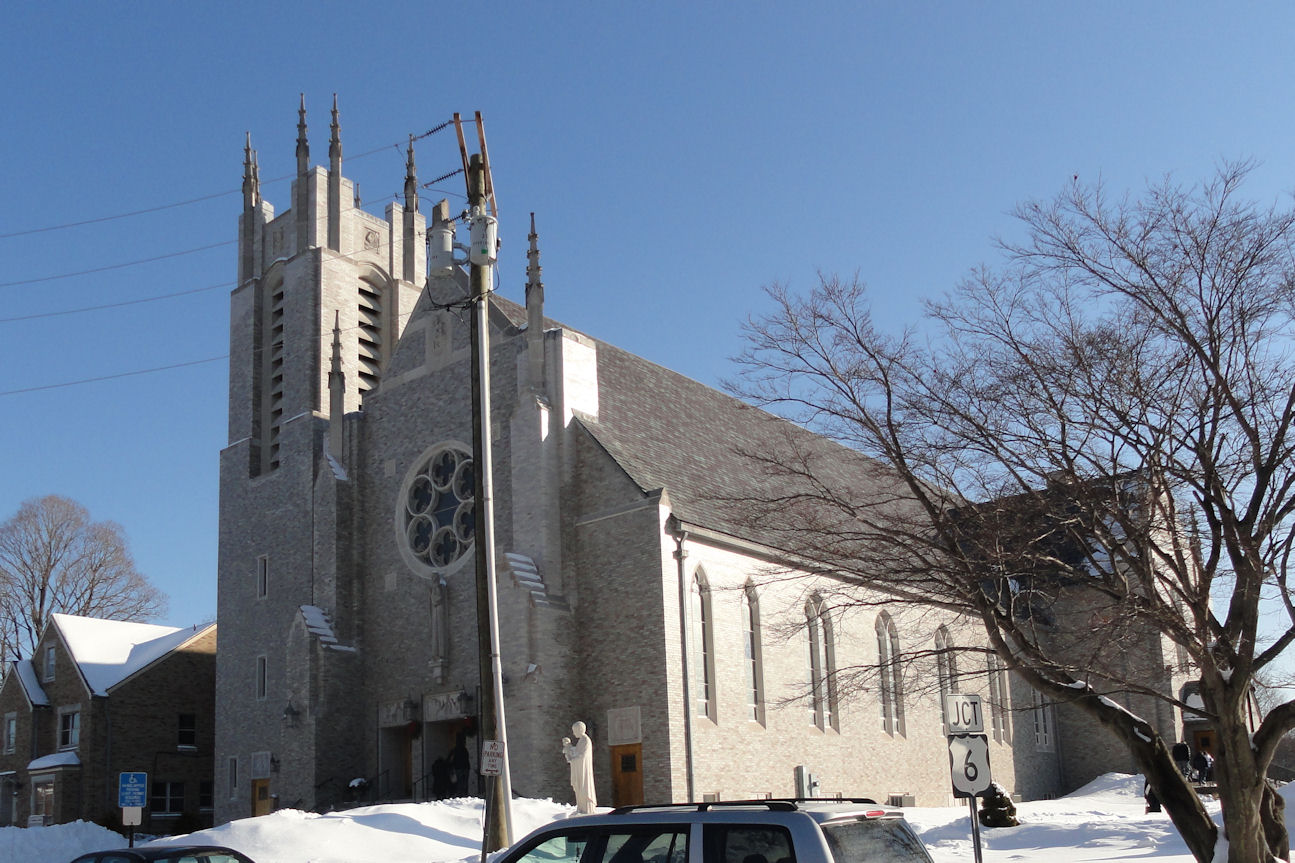
St. Stanislaus Church

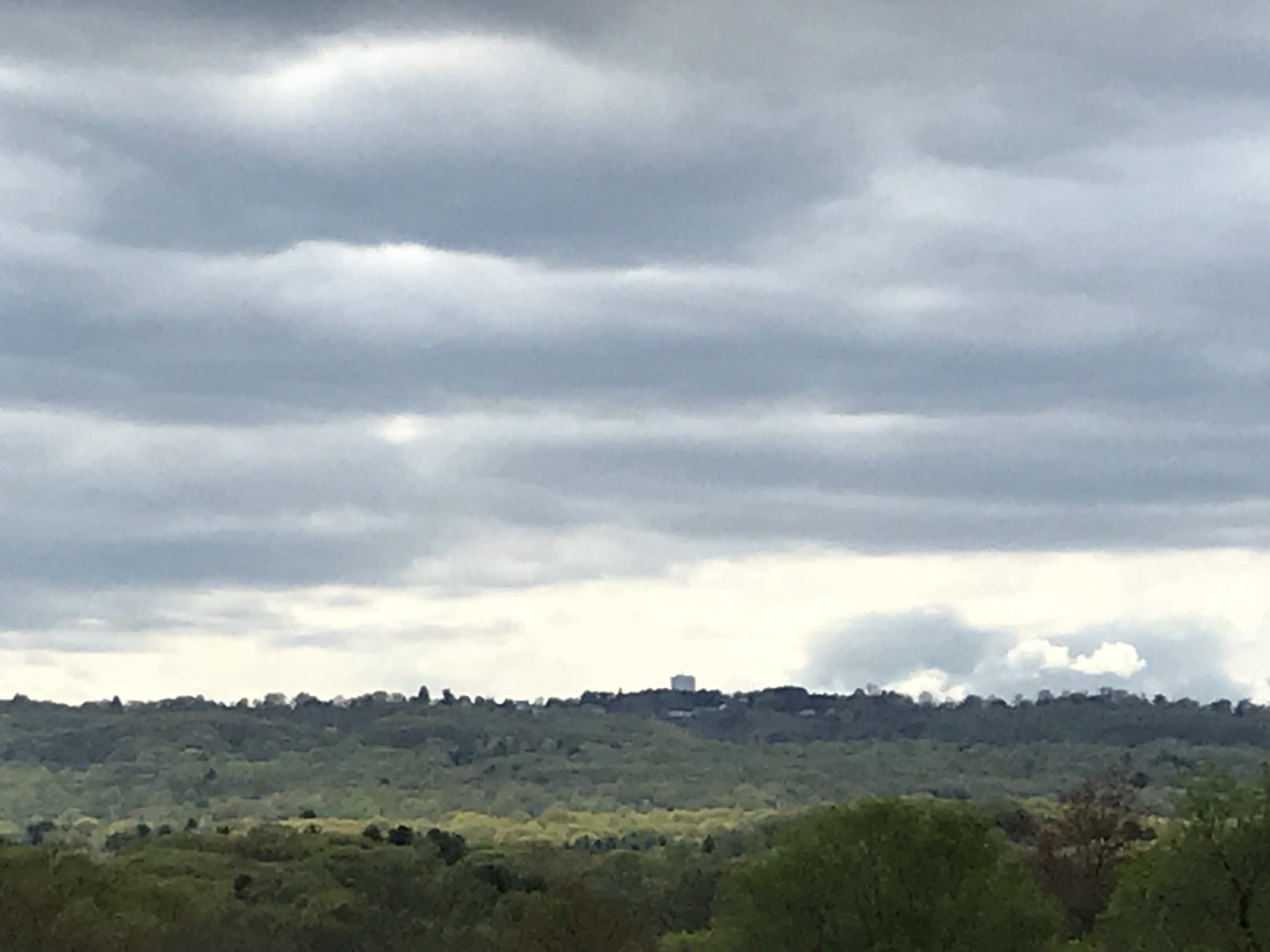
Mountains, seen from Bristol, near the Burlington border
