= Rockwell Park =

- U.S. National Register of Historic Places
- U.S. Historic district
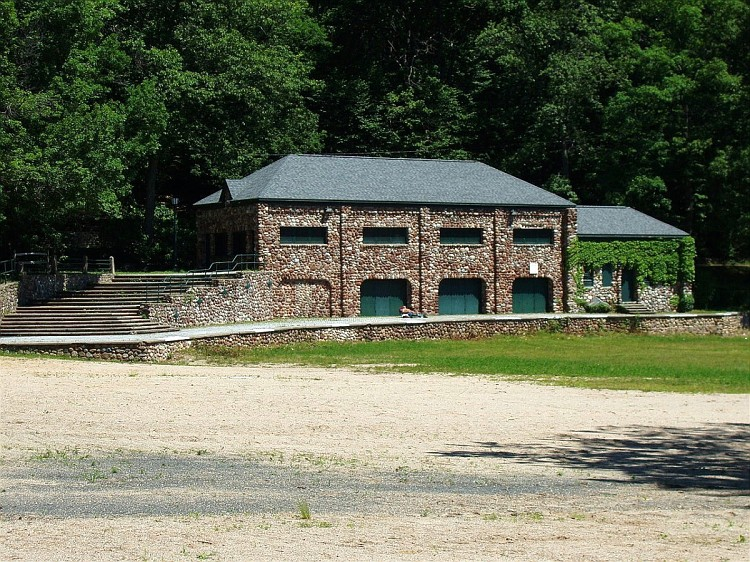

- Location within Connecticut Location within the United States
- Location: Dutton Avenue and Jacobs Street, Bristol, Connecticut
- Coordinates: 41°40′26″N 72°57′43″W
- Area: 104 acres (42 ha)
- Built: 1914
- Architect: Sheffield Arnold
- NRHP reference No.: 87000788
- Added to NRHP: May 21, 1987

Rockwell Park is a public park in Bristol, Connecticut. Located in a residential area West of Downtown Bristol, it includes open spaces and woodlands on either side of the Pequabuck River. Park amenities include a swimming pool, sports fields, and a playground. Many of the park's buildings are built out of rustic cobblestone, and include several follies. The park, the city's first public park, was listed on the National Register of Historic Places in 1987.

== Setting and layout ==
Rockwell Park is an elongated area of 104 acres (42 ha), extending from Steele Road in the east to Park Street and Terryville Road in the west. The Pequabuck River, a swiftly flowing stream, roughly bisects the western two-thirds of the park, running south of the park's eastern lobe. The northernmost portions of the park are heavily wooded steep terrain, and are undeveloped except for hiking trails. The southern portions are more level, and include two artificial ponds, a large lawn for passive recreation, and a cluster of sports fields and playground.

== Architecture ==
The buildings and structures of the park are characterized by rustic cobblestone architecture. The three main entrances to the park each have gates built out of cobblestone, that at Dutton Avenue the most elaborate. The most architecturally sophisticated building is the Summerhouse, a pavilion structure featuring rounded arches and roof finials.

== History ==
The park was donated to the city in 1914 by Albert Rockwell, the owner of a local manufacturer of automotive parts, doorbells, and other products. Rockwell retained Sheffield Arnold, a landscape architect based in Boston, Massachusetts, to design the park. The park's early inclusion of recreational amenities is typical of parks of the early 20th century, and a departure from earlier parks, which often emphasized carriage roads and passive uses. The parkland was originally part of the Rockwell estate, and the Rockwells' original gift of 80 acres (32 ha) was enlarged over the years by further gifts. The Rockwells also regularly contributed additional funds for maintenance and new facilities. The park was the city's only public park until 1933.

== See also ==
- National Register of Historic Places listings in Hartford County, Connecticut
