= Karun Treasure =

Treasure amassed by Croesus

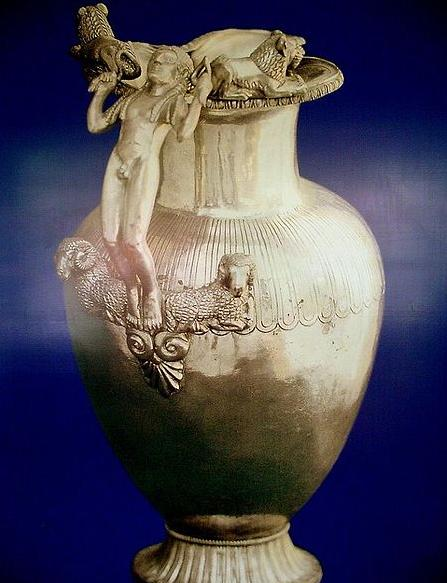
Jug from Lydian Treasure found near Uşak

Kârun Treasure is the name given to a collection of 363 valuable Lydian artifacts dating from the 7th century BC and originating from Uşak Province in western Turkey, which were the subject of a legal battle between Turkey and New York Metropolitan Museum of Art between 1987 and 1993. They were returned to Turkey in 1993 after the Museum admitted it had known the objects were stolen when they had purchased them. The collection is alternatively known as the Lydian Hoard. The items are exhibited in the Uşak Museum of Archaeology.

The collection made sensational news once again in May 2006 when a key piece, a golden hippocamp, on display in Uşak Museum along with the rest of the collection, was discovered to have been replaced by a fake, probably between March and August 2005.

The original golden hippocamp brooch was returned to the museum several years later when the previous director of the museum, Kazim Akbiyikoglu, who had been instrumental in recovering the artifacts from the US, was arrested with 10 others, and admitted selling museum treasures to pay off gambling debts. He blamed his misfortune on an ancient curse said to afflict those who handle the treasure, and was jailed for 13 years.

Yet another term used for the collection is "Croesus Treasure". Although the artifacts were closely contemporary to Croesus, whether they should be directly associated with the legendary Lydian king or not remains debatable. Croesus' wealth had repercussions on a number of Asian cultures in a vein similar to his fame in the western cultures, and is referred to either as قارون Qārūn (Arabic, Persian) or Kârun (Turkish), or Korah, with the mythical proportions of his fortune also echoed in various ways, parallel to the English language expression "as rich as Croesus". This explains why the term "Karun Treasure" took hold, and in any case, the king Croesus' Treasure consisted of more than 363 pieces and the tomb chamber tumulus where most artifacts were discovered (they originate from close but different sites) was that of a woman.

== Discovery and smuggling ==
The main and the most precious part of the treasure comes from a tomb chamber of a Lydian princess reached through illegal excavations carried out by three fortune-seekers from Uşak's depending Güre village, at the proximity of which the tomb was located, at the locality called Toptepe. After having dug for days and unable to break through the marble masonry of the chamber door, they had dynamited the roof of the tomb in the night of 6 June 1966, to be the first to see the buried Lydian noblewoman and her treasures after 2600 years. The treasure looted from this particular tomb was enriched by further finds by the same men in other tumuli of the locality during 1966-1967. The collection was smuggled outside Turkey in separate dispatches through İzmir and Amsterdam, to be bought by the Metropolitan Museum of Art between 1967–1968, at an invoiced cost of $1.2 million for 200 of the pieces within the collection.

== Legal battle ==
The efforts made by successive Turkish governments to retrieve the collection were incited since the very beginning and followed until conclusion by the journalist Özgen Acar. Acar had chanced upon some pieces of the collection for the first time in 1984 in a Met Museum catalogue and had informed Turkey's Ministry of Culture of their clear provenance, while he also wrote several articles and pursued the bureaucratic channels within Turkey with insistence throughout the affair. He acted as a voluntary envoy of the Ministry within the frame of the judicial case launched in New York City in 1987 and brought to conclusion in 1993, at the same time as he was named consultant in the larger framework of the Turkey's participation in the work carried out by UNIDROIT regarding the protection of historic, cultural and religious heritage. Acar's name is also synonymous in Turkey for the retrieval of another set of smuggled archaeological goods, termed "Elmalı Treasure" in reference to their site of origin, the town of Elmalı in southwestern Turkey, and involving this time Lydian coins and extremely rare decadrachms dating from the period of the Delian League, with the Boston Museum of Fine Arts as his opposite party.

== Uşak Museum case ==
The clear need for a museum worthy of the treasure was being voiced ever since the artifacts had returned to Turkey. With the seizure by the authorities of ten other illegally excavated artifacts in 1998, further archaeological discoveries and the known presence of eight gold pieces that had appeared in 2000 during an exhibition in a Paris private gallery for which attempts for retrieval were yet to be made, a handsome collection of base consisting of a total of 375 pieces was already accumulated. But the small museum in Uşak where the collection was placed, more focused on storage of Ushak carpets and operating under conditions of budgetary and staff restraints, did not fully meet the requirements for the preservation of Karu Treasure. Doubts about the site's suitability were reinforced by the filing of legal action against museum staff regarding the 2007 theft. Ten people were initially accused in relation to the hippocamp's replacement with a fake; the museum's former director was the only one kept in custody.

== Curse of the treasure ==
Some in Uşak and beyond associate the treasure with a curse. Legend has it that the seven men who took part in the illegal digs "died violent deaths or suffered great misfortune".

== Gallery ==
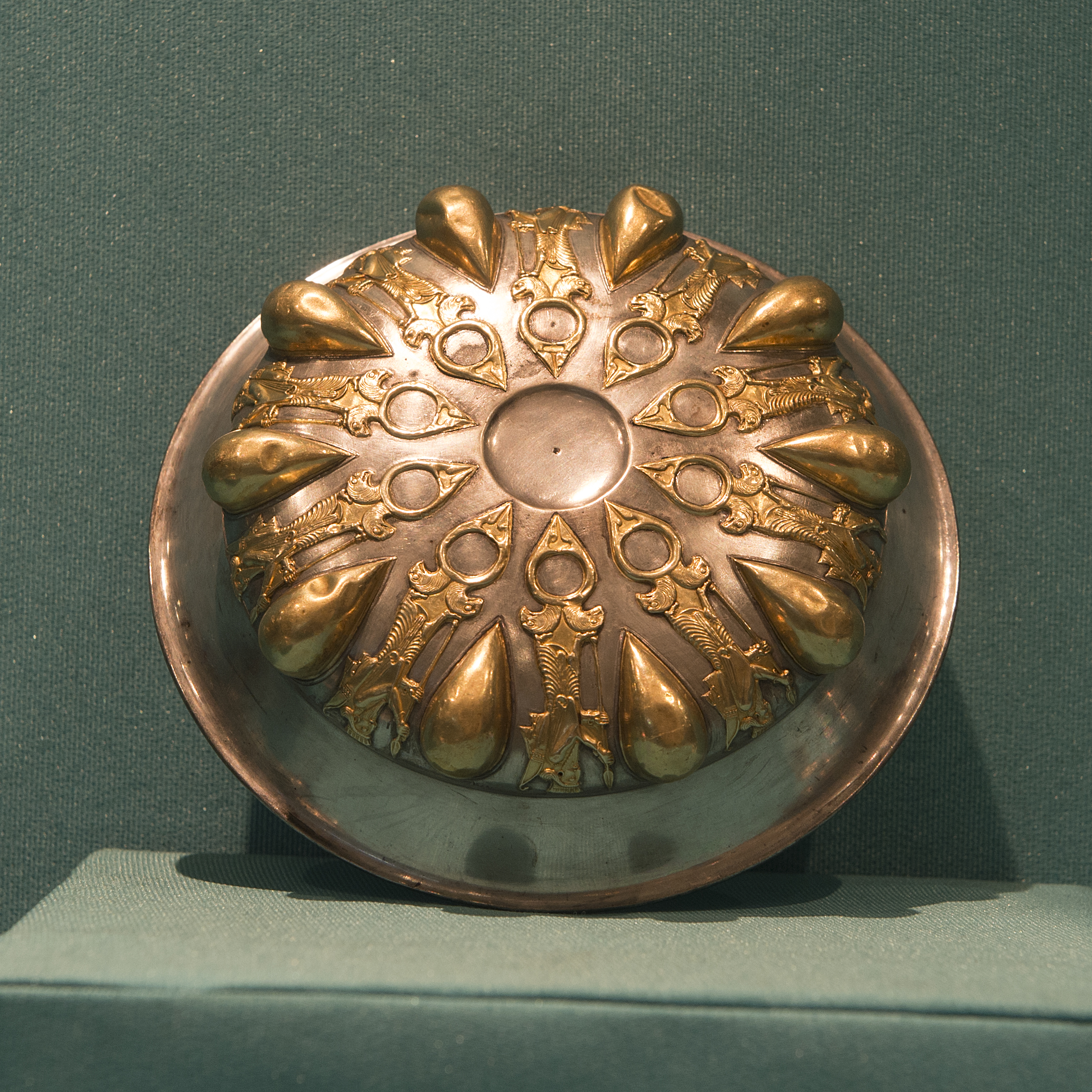
Uşak Museum Karun Treasure vessel

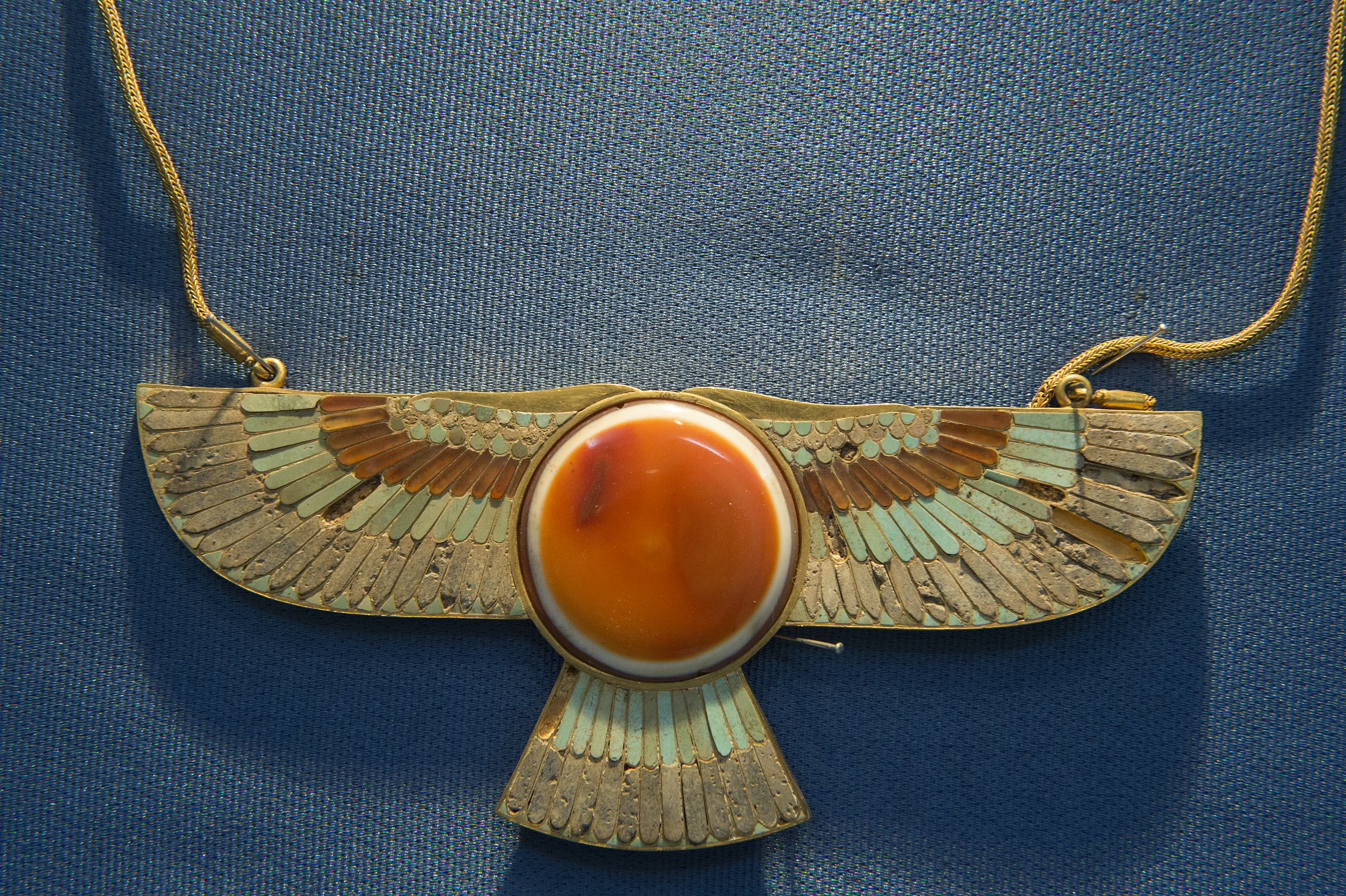
Uşak Museum Karun Treasure necklace

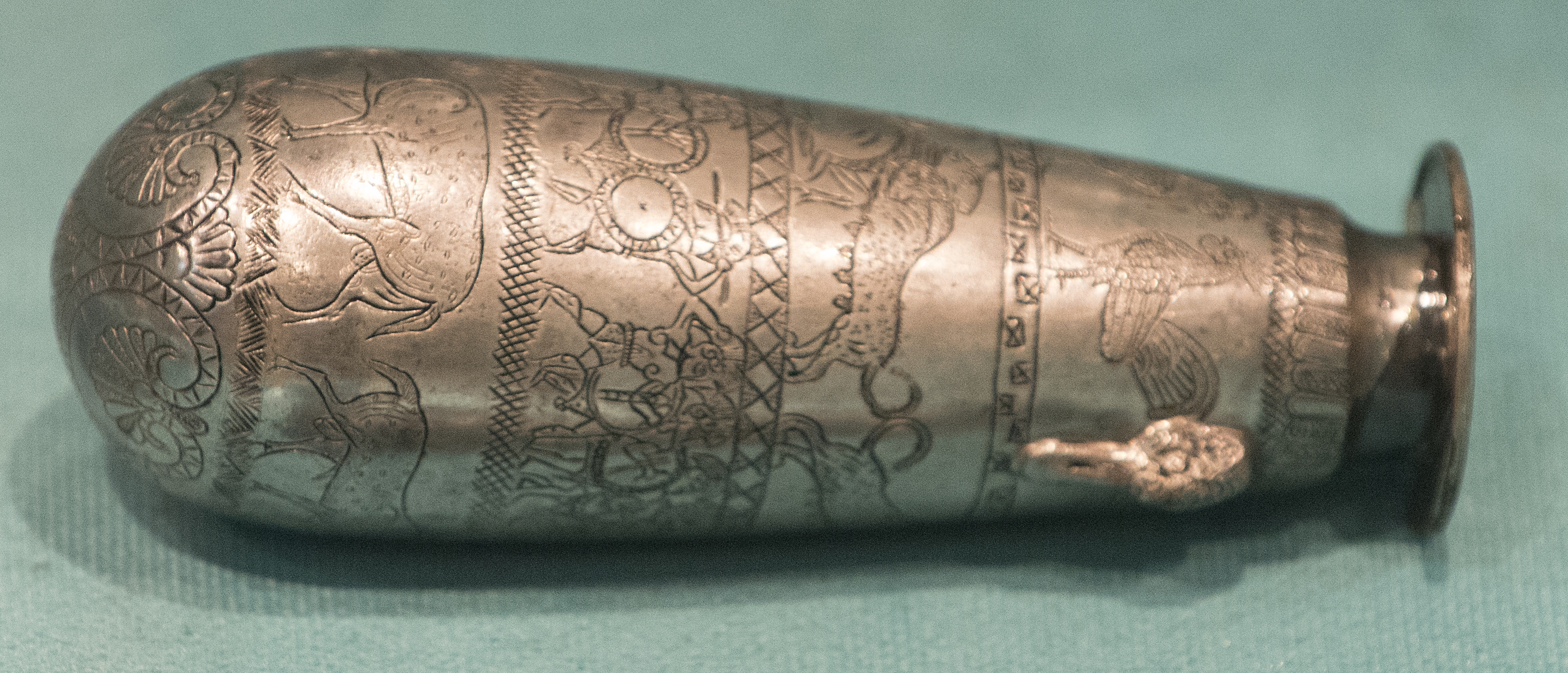
Uşak Museum Karun Treasure alabastron

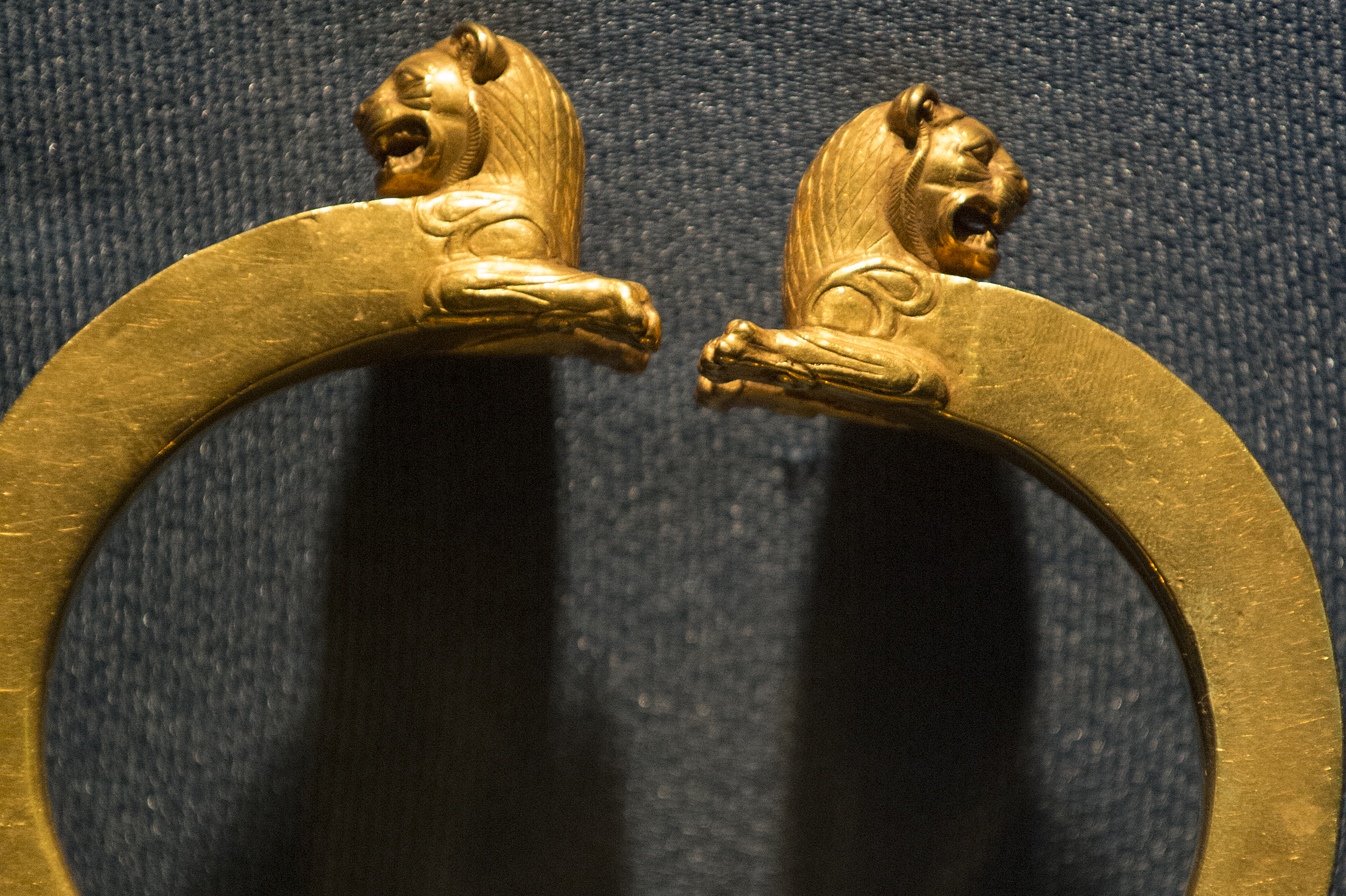
Uşak Museum Karun Treasure gold bracelet

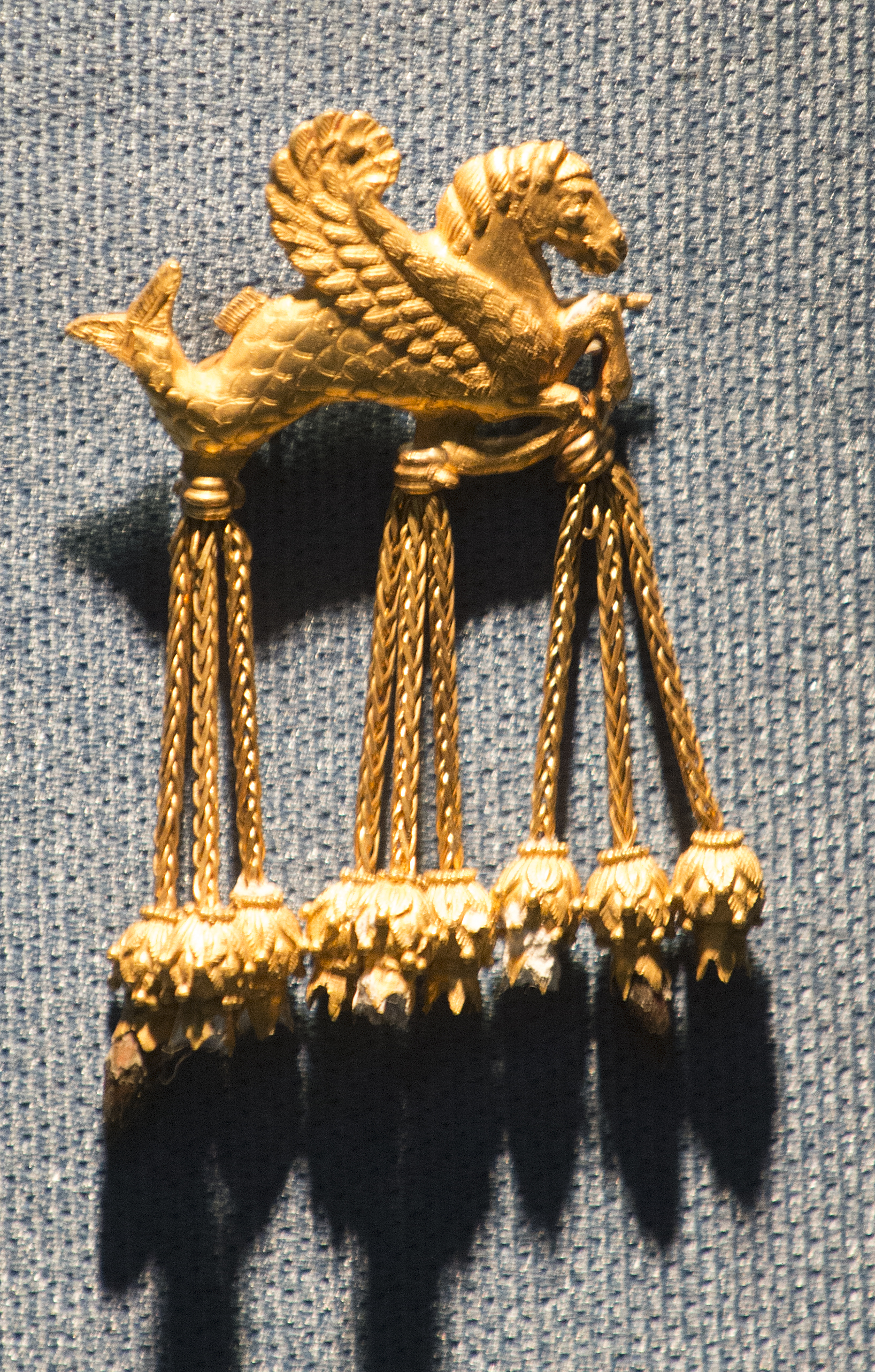
Uşak Winged Karun Treasure fake seahorse brooch

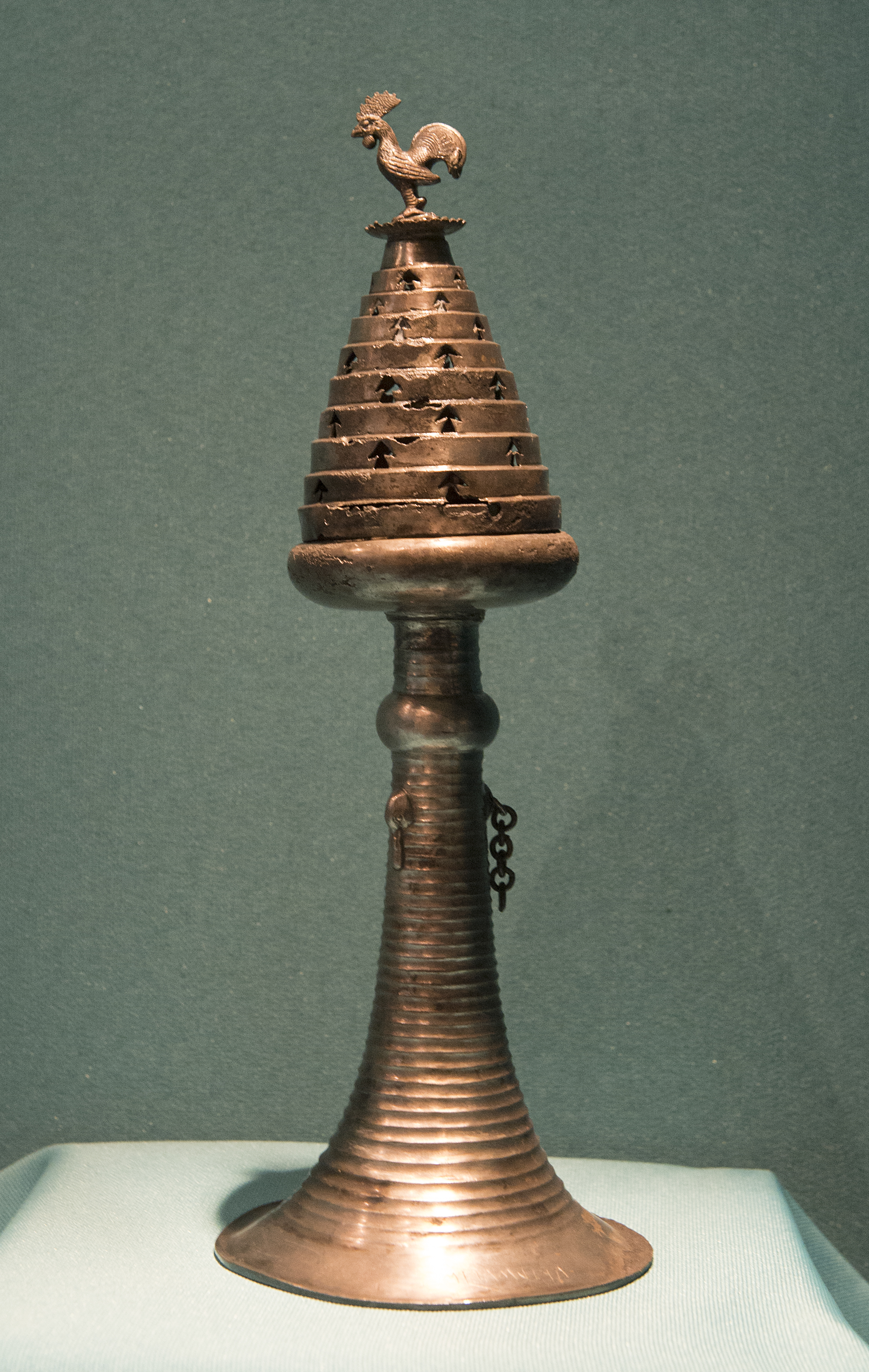
Uşak Museum Karun Treasure incense burner

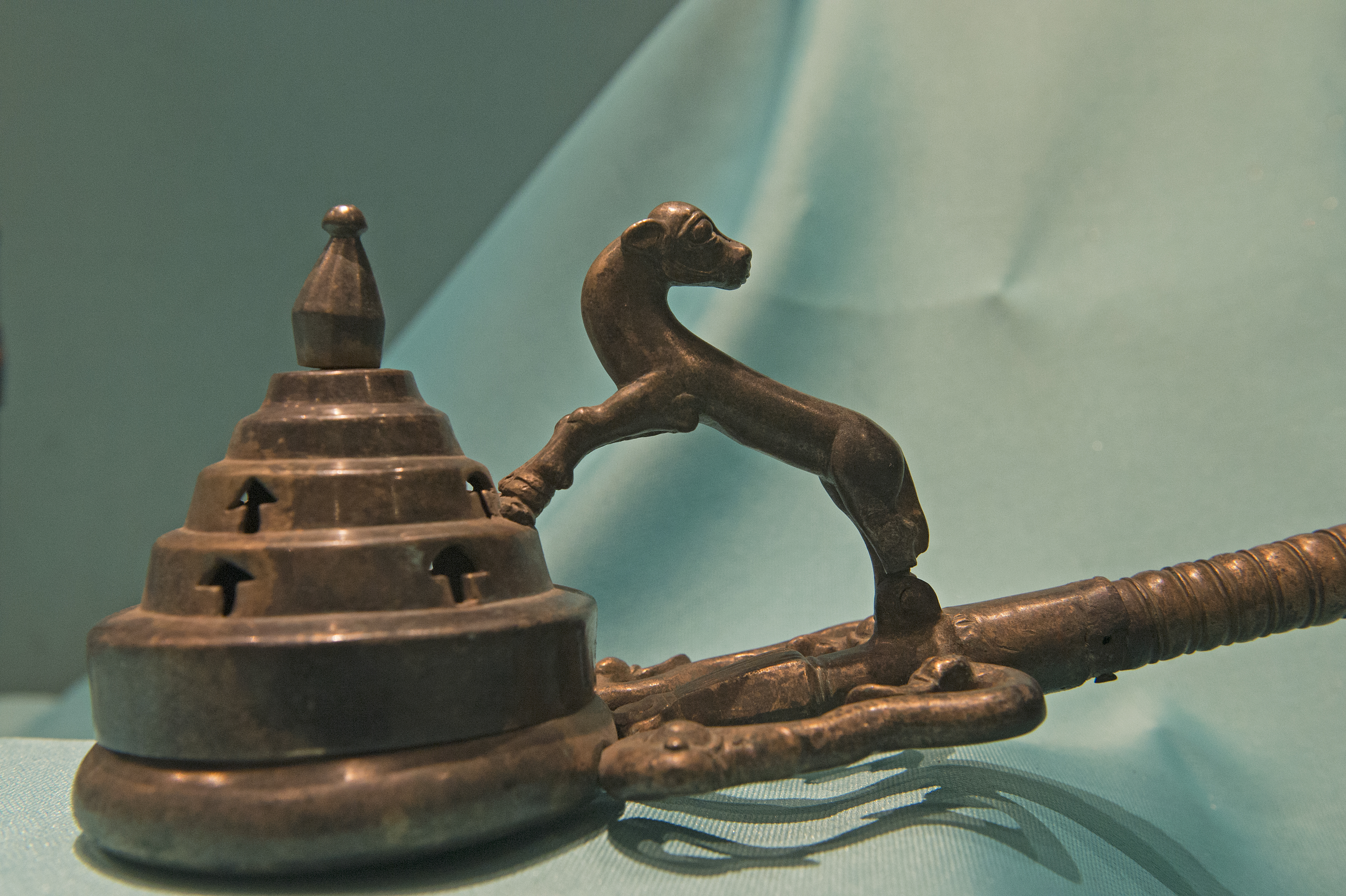
Uşak Museum Karun Treasure incense burner

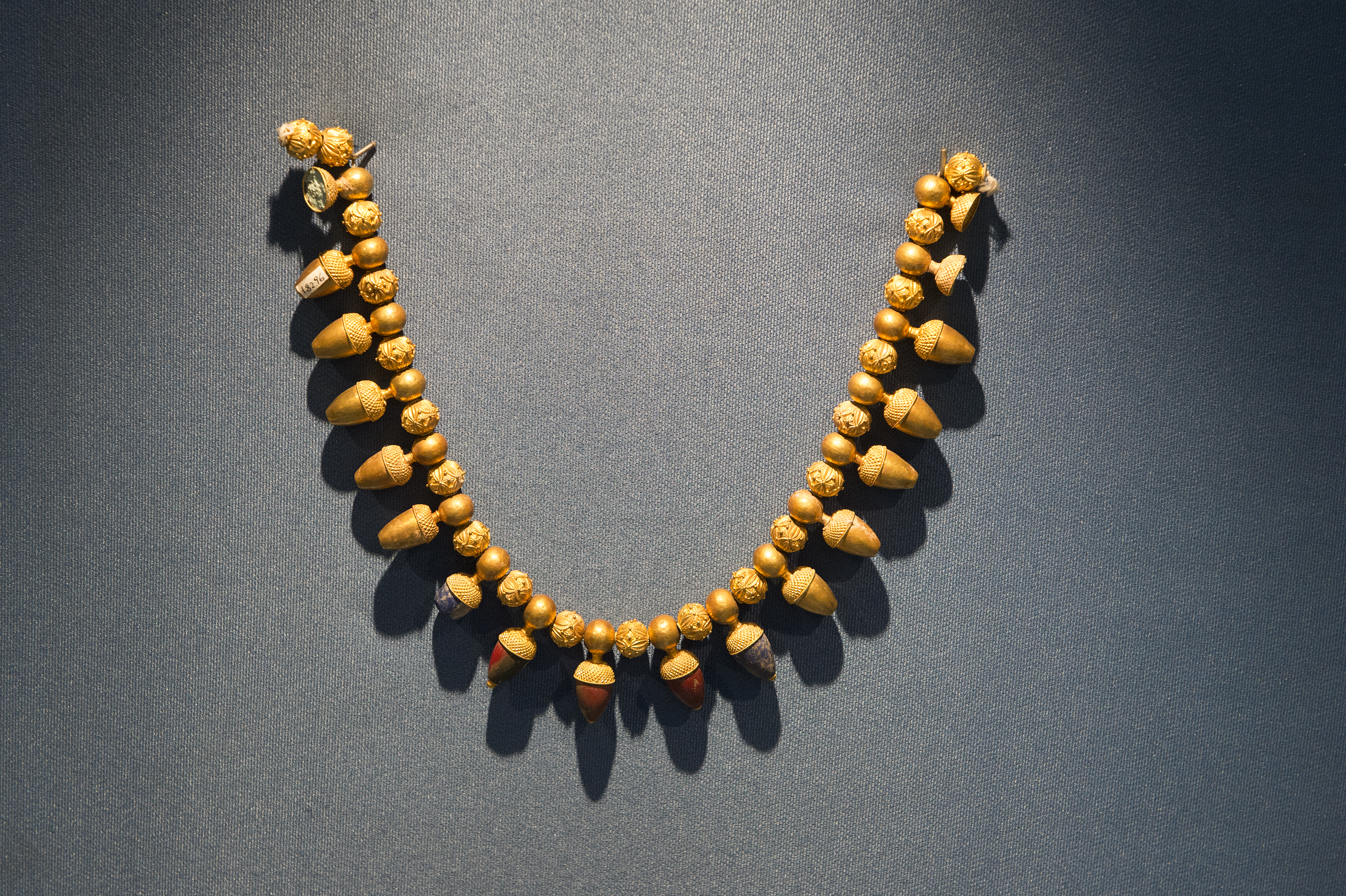
Uşak Museum Karun Treasure necklace

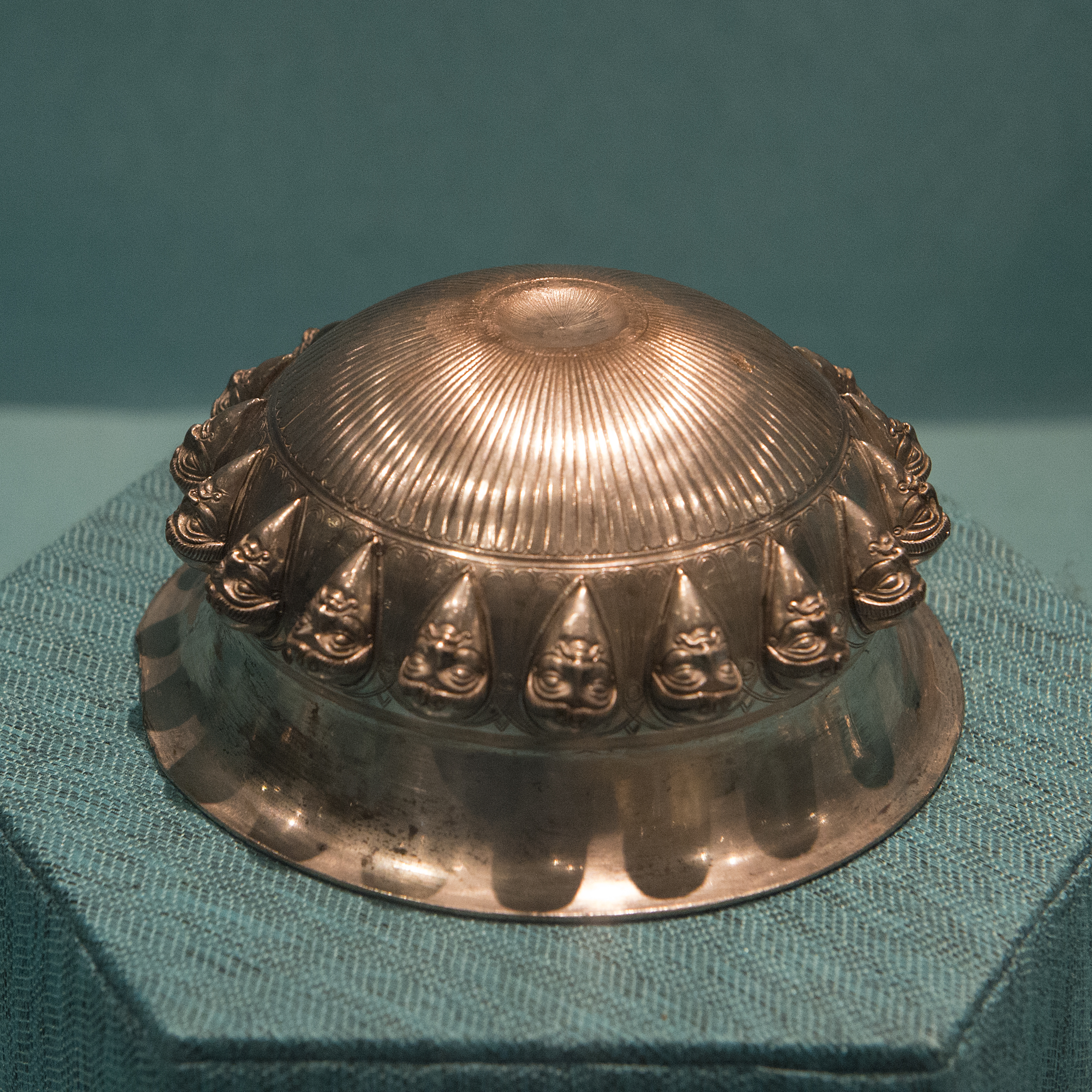
Uşak Museum Karun Treasure vessel

== See also ==
- Bin Tepe
- Illicit antiquities
- Sardis
