= Main Street Historic District (Bristol, Connecticut) =

Historic district in Connecticut, United States

- U.S. National Register of Historic Places
- U.S. Historic district
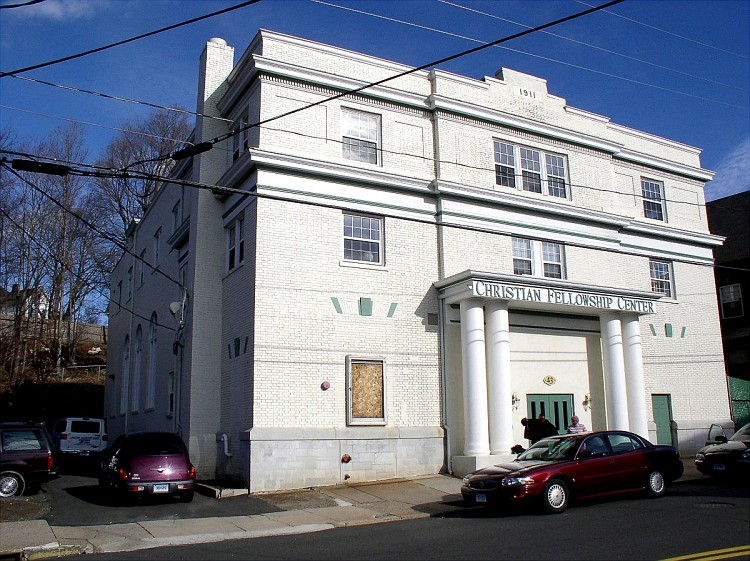
- The former Carberry Theater building

- Location within Connecticut Location within the United States
- Location: Roughly, Main Street from School Street to Summer Street and adjacent areas of Prospect Street, Bristol, Connecticut
- Coordinates: 41.67288°N 72.94276°W
- Area: 20 acres (8.1 ha)
- Architect: Crabtree, Walter; McKim, Mead, and White
- Architectural style: Late Gothic Revival, Classical Revival, Art Deco
- NRHP reference No.: 95001006
- Added to NRHP: August 15, 1995

The Main Street Historic District of Bristol, Connecticut encompasses much of the city's central business district, an area built up in the late 19th and early 20th centuries. The district's 19 historic buildings are located along adjoining stretches of Main and Prospect Streets, and include important civic and commercial buildings. The district was listed on the National Register of Historic Places in 1995.

== Description and history ==
The city of Bristol was incorporated as a town in 1785 and as a city in 1910. It historically had two principal villages, the southern one located near the banks of the Pequabuck River, where early industrial activity developed. The city center arose on the north side of the river in the pre-Civil War 19th century, when the town became America's leading manufacturer of clocks. Main Street was laid out in 1826, through the efforts of Chauncey Jerome, owner of an early clock factory, and the river crossing spurred additional industrial development along the river. The town center's subsequent growth as a financial, commercial, and civic center was assured by the 1850 arrival of the railroad. All of Bristol's early banks were located here, and its old town hall still stands here as well.

The historic district extends along Main Street, from Summer and High streets in the north to Riverside Avenue in the south, and extends for one block along Prospect Street near its center. Most of the district buildings are either brick or masonry in construction, and range in height from two to four stories. Prominent buildings include the Bristol National Bank building at 200 Main Street, designed by McKim, Mead & White, and the Lorraine Building/Curtis Block building at 175 Main Street, which was built in c. 1905, but restyled in the Art Deco style with a cast-stone facade.

== See also ==
- National Register of Historic Places listings in Hartford County, Connecticut
