= Bristol Mum Festival =

Harvest festival in Connecticut, US

Coordinates: 41.669°N 72.941°W

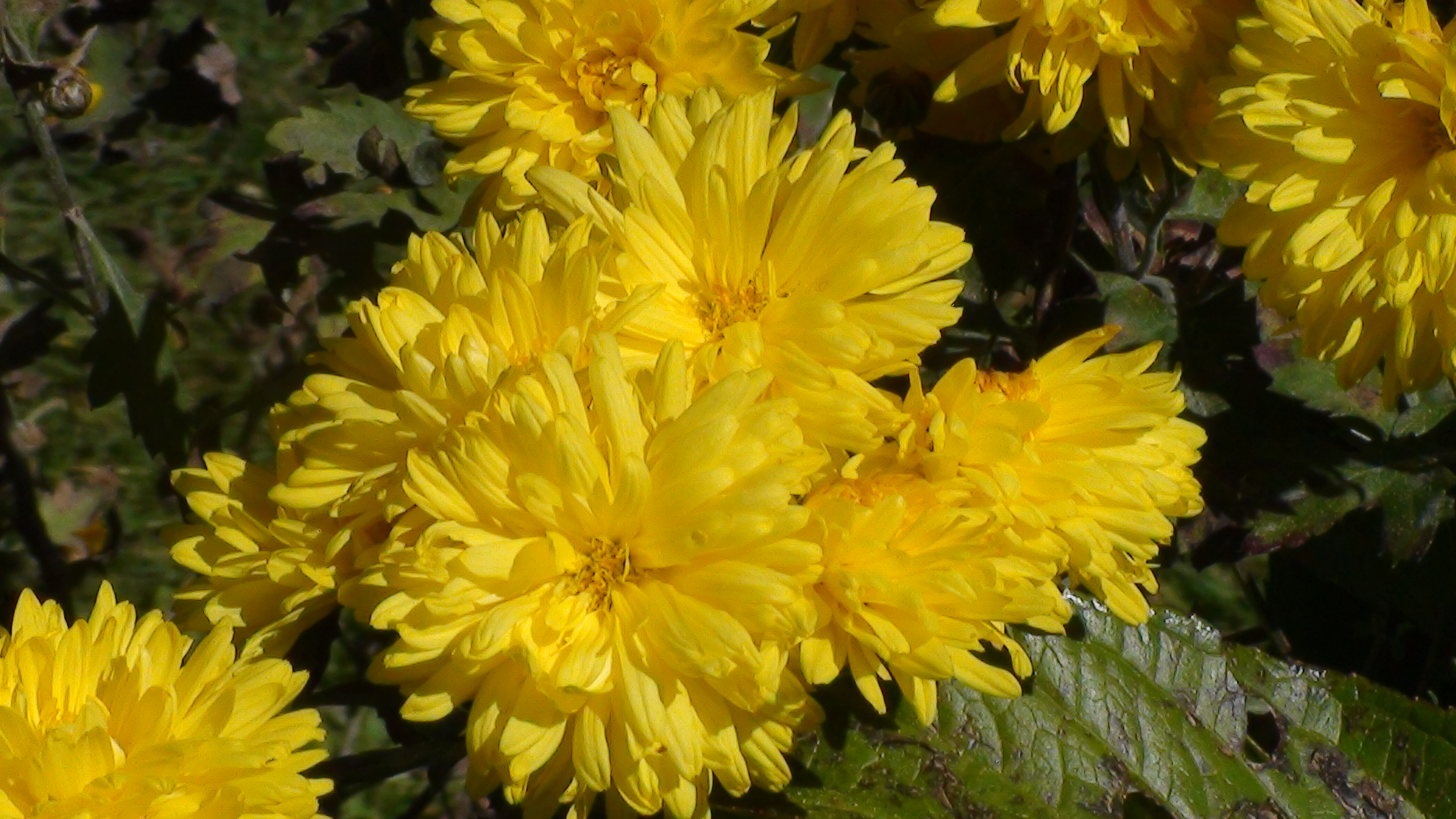
Chrysanthemum flowers

The Bristol Mum Festival is an annual festival in Bristol, Connecticut which includes a Mum Parade in Connecticut. The festival celebrates chrysanthemums, formerly a major product of the town, and was first held on Sunday, October 7, 1962. Opening ceremonies kicked off the celebration, now known as the Bristol Mum Festival. Amidst the floral carpet of the former Bristol Nurseries on Chippens Hill. Ralph Joerres, the first Chairman of the Festival opened the festivities inviting everyone to the first Open House events which were welcoming Bristolites to the American Clock & Watch Museum, Bristol Water Company and the newly remodeled North Side Bank & Trust Company. The members of the Chamber of Commerce and City of Bristol officials assembled a list of activities to take place over six days. They wanted to focus on the positive things happening in Bristol.

When the festival opened it was originally known as the Fall Festival. In 1963 the Chrysanthemum (mum) was also added to the festival's name. Prior to 1986 (when production stopped), the nurseries in Bristol produced over 80,000 mum plants, with acres of land covered in mums. During the festival over 10,000 people would visit the nurseries.

This festival went on hiatus in 2020.
