= Bristol Eastern High School =

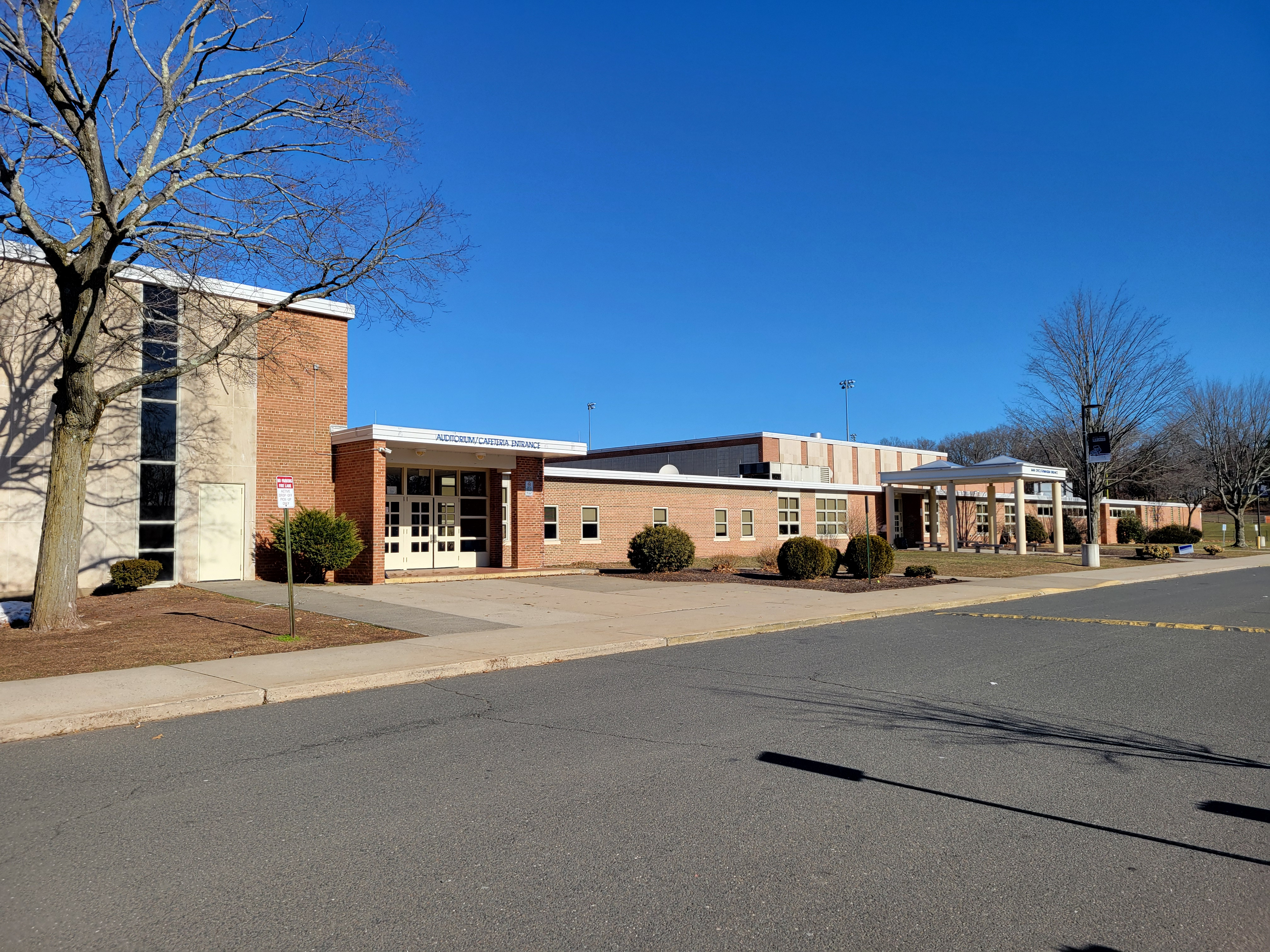

Location
- 632 King Street; Bristol, Connecticut 06010; United States
- Coordinates: 41°41′09″N 72°55′20″W

Information
- Type: Public
- Motto: "We Are Committed To Excellence ."
- Established: 1959 (67 years ago)
- School district: Bristol Public Schools
- Superintendent: Sue Moreau
- CEEB code: 070076
- Principal: Michael Higgins
- Teaching staff: 76.45 (on an FTE basis)
- Grades: 9-12
- Enrollment: 1,041 (2023-2024)
- Student to teacher ratio: 13.62
- Colors: Blue and grey
- Fight song: "High Eastern High"
- Team name: Lancers
- Accreditation: NEASC
- Website: behs.bristol.k12.ct.us

Bristol Eastern High School is a public high school in Bristol, Connecticut, United States which was opened in 1959. It has an enrollment of 1,367 students in grades 9-12. As of 2019, its principal is Michael Higgins. Its mascot is the Lancer and the school colors are blue and gray.

== Athletics ==
State championships:

- Girls basketball: 1983, 1987, 1990, 1991
- Volleyball: 1987, 1991, 2005, 2006, 2012
- Wrestling: 1996, 2017, 2018, 2019
- Softball: 1997, 2007
- Baseball: 1986
- Football: 1988
- Boys cross country: 1967

== Notable alumni ==
- Tom Shopay, (Class of 1963), former Major League Baseball player for New York Yankees and Baltimore Orioles
