= St. Stanislaus Parish (Bristol, Connecticut) =

Coordinates: 41°40′51″N 72°56′57″W

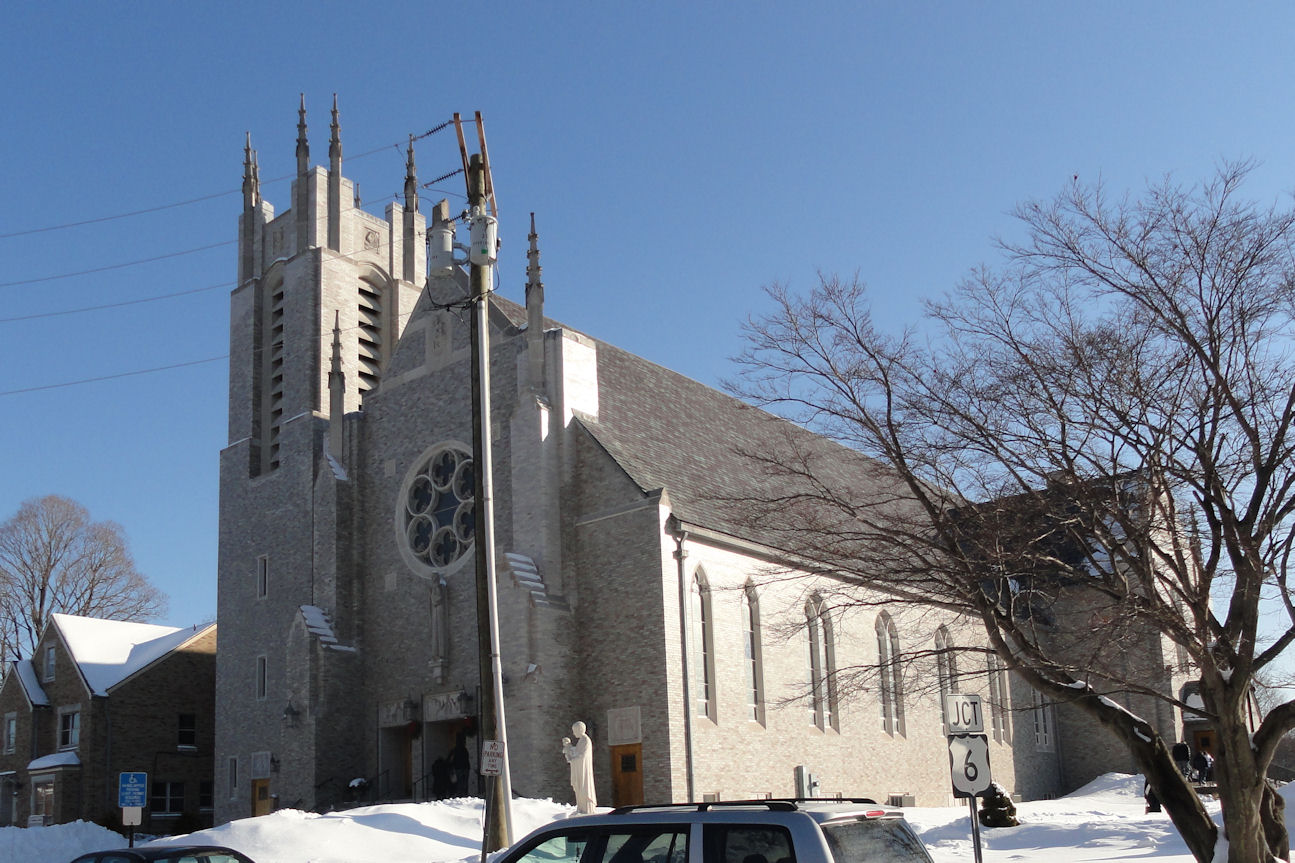
- St. Stanislaus Parish
- Location: 510 West Street; Bristol, Connecticut
- Country: United States
- Denomination: Roman Catholic
- Website: Parish website

History
- Founded: 1919
- Founder: Polish immigrants
- Dedication: St. Stanislaus Kostka
- Dedicated: September 6, 1926

Administration
- Division: Vicariate: Waterbury
- District: Bristol
- Province: Hartford
- Archdiocese: Hartford

Clergy
- Archbishop: Most Rev. Leonard Paul Blair, S.T.D.
- Bishop: Most Rev. Juan Bettancourt
- Vicar: Rev. Grzegorz Jaworowski
- Pastor: Rev. Tomasz Sztuber

St. Stanislaus Parish (Polish language: Parafia św. Stanisława Kostki w Bristol)was originally built to serve Polish immigrants in Bristol, Connecticut, United States.

It was founded in 1919 and is one of the Polish-American Roman Catholic parishes in New England in the Archdiocese of Hartford.

== History ==
On April 21, 1919, Bishop John Joseph Nilan named Fr. George Bartlewski founding pastor of St. Stanislaus Parish. The construction of a basement church was blessed on September 26, 1920 by Bishop John Joseph Nilan. Auxiliary Bishop John G. Murray dedicated the basement church on May 30, 1921.

In 1954 the basement church was demolished, and Masses were temporarily moved to the school hall as plans were made to complete the church. A new Gothic edifice in brick rose on the site of the original church and was dedicated on May 20, 1956. The architect of the new church was James J. O'Shaughnessy.

The organ at St. Stanislaus Church was built in 1956 by Austin Organs, Inc. It is a two manual instrument with 13 ranks of pipes.

== School ==
- St. Stanislaus School

== Bibliography ==
- The 150th Anniversary of Polish-American Pastoral Ministry. Webster, Massachusetts: St. Joseph Basilica. September 11, 2005.
- The Official Catholic Directory in USA
