= Bristol Historical Society Museum =

Museum in Bristol, Connecticut

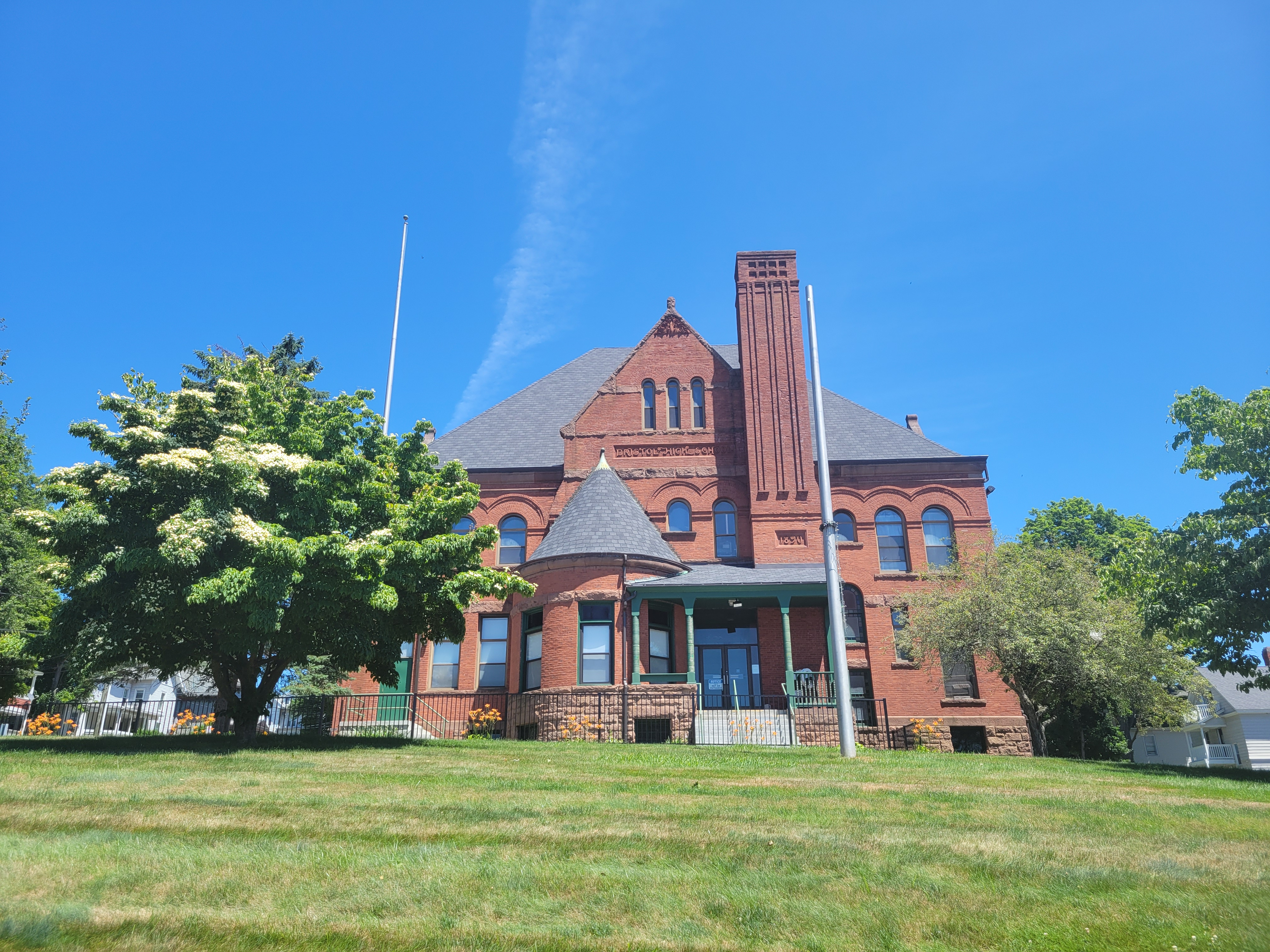
- Bristol Historical Society Museum
- Location: 98 Summer Street; Bristol, Connecticut
- Coordinates: 41.6762°N 72.9439°W
- Website: www.bristolhistoricalsociety.org

The Bristol Historical Society Museum, located in Bristol, Connecticut, is a museum dedicated to the promotion of interest in Bristol history and encouraging an appreciation for its importance. The Bristol Historical Society collects, preserves, and interprets significant historical resources to enhance the present community and provide a historical context for future growth.

The Bristol Historical Society Museum is located in Bristol's first high school on the corner of Summer and Center Streets. The building was built in 1894 with a large addition added in 1910. The brick Victorian building is built in the style known as Richardsonian Romanesque.
