= Tom Shopay =

American baseball player

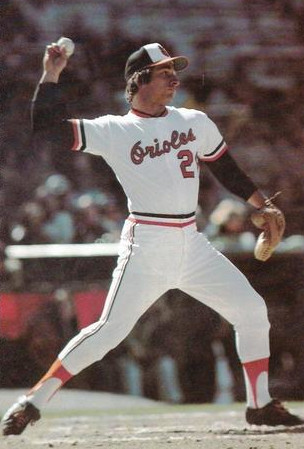
- Outfielder
- Born: February 21, 1945 (age 81); Bristol, Connecticut, U.S.
- Batted: Left Threw: Right

MLB debut
- September 17, 1967, for the New York Yankees

Last MLB appearance
- September 30, 1977, for the Baltimore Orioles

MLB statistics
- Batting average: .201
- Home runs: 3
- Runs batted in: 20
- Stats at Baseball Reference

Teams
- New York Yankees (1967, 1969); Baltimore Orioles (1971–1972, 1975–1977)

Thomas Michael Shopay (born February 21, 1945) is a former Major League Baseball player. Shopay was a left-handed hitter who played outfield for the New York Yankees (1967, 1969) and Baltimore Orioles (1971–72, 1975–77).

== Professional career ==
Shopay attended Bristol Eastern High School in Bristol, CT. He was attending Dean College in Franklin, MA when he was selected by the New York Yankees in the 34th round (624th overall) of the 1965 Major League Baseball draft. He was picked in the Rule 5 draft by the Baltimore Orioles on December 1, 1969. He never had more than 74 at-bats in any of his seven seasons in the majors.

Although only a .201 career hitter (62-for-309) with 3 home runs and 20 RBI in 253 games over 7 seasons, Shopay was good defensively, recording a .993 fielding percentage, committing only 1 error in 151 total chances in 525 innings at all three outfield positions and catcher. Said error occurred during his Yankees tenure on September 23, 1967 in the 6th inning of an away game against the Minnesota Twins.
