= Katharine Shepard =

American archaeologist

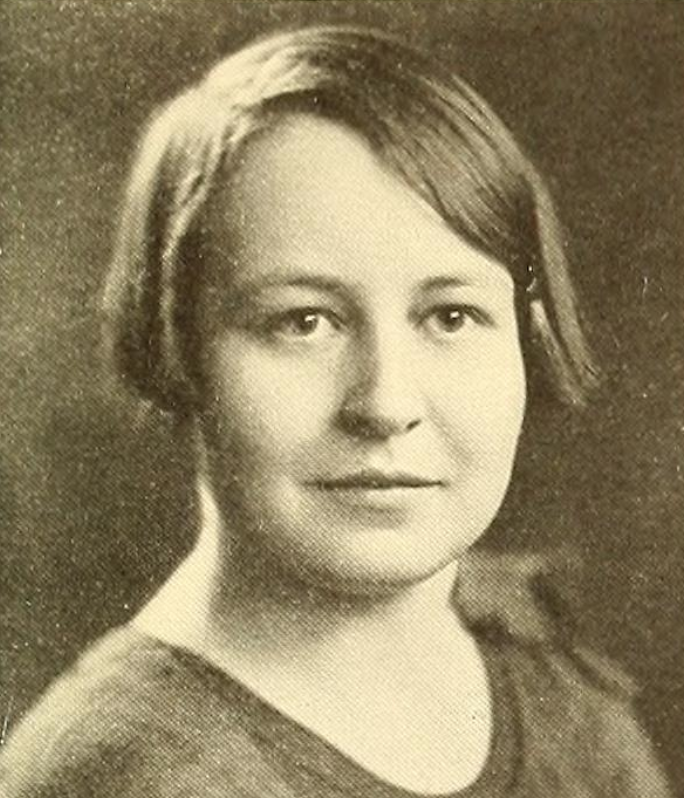
- Katharine Shepard, from the 1928 yearbook of Bryn Mawr College
- Born: June 4, 1905; Bristol, Connecticut, U.S.
- Died: June 29, 1986 (aged 81); Glastonbury, Connecticut, U.S.
- Occupation(s): Archaeologist, art historian

Katharine Shepard (June 4, 1905 – June 29, 1986) was an American archaeologist and art historian. She was a curator at the National Gallery of Art in Washington, D.C., where she worked from 1941 until 1975.

== Early life and education ==
Shepard was born in Bristol, Connecticut, the daughter of Charles Norton Shepard and Marguerite Dunbar Shepard. Her father was an ordained clergyman who taught at General Theological Seminary in New York City. She graduated from Bryn Mawr College in 1928. She earned a master's degree in archaeology at Bryn Mawr in 1929, and pursued further studies at the American School of Classical Studies at Athens from 1930 to 1931, and at Bryn Mawr as a Greek fellow in 1931 to 1932. She completed doctoral studies in archaeology at Bryn Mawr College in 1936.

== Career ==
Shepard worked with archaeologist Hetty Goldman. In 1941, she started working at the National Gallery of Art in Washington, D.C., eventually as a curator in the Graphic Arts department. In 1951, she was elected secretary of the Washington Society, a local chapter of the Archaeological Institute of America. She represented the Washington Society as a delegate to the annual meetings of the institute in the 1950s. She also taught art history at Catholic University of America. She retired to Connecticut in 1975.

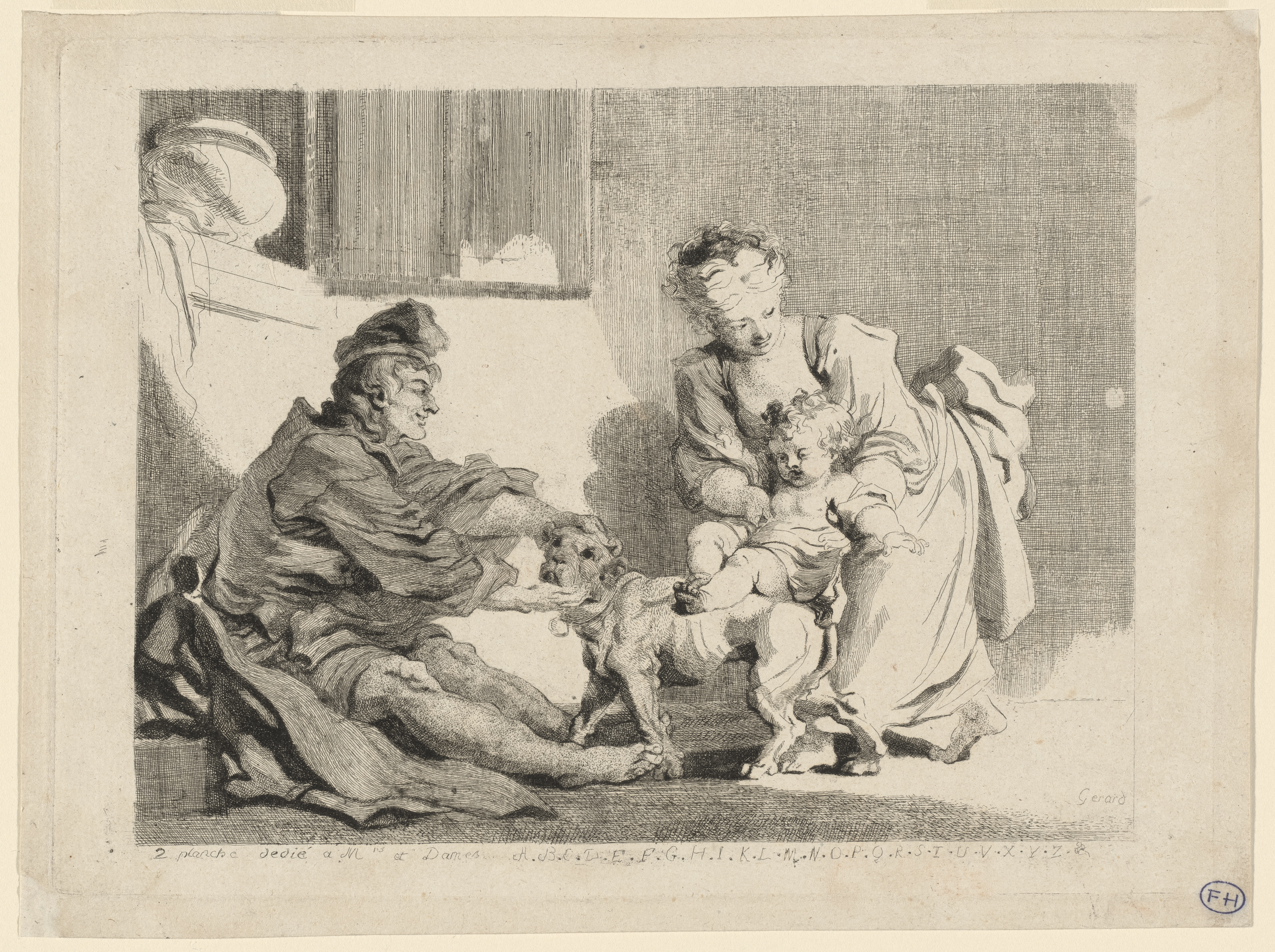
Marguerite Gérard, The Child and the Bulldog, 1778, NGA 163231; acquired with support from the Jeffrey E. Horvitz Fund and the Katharine Shepard Fund

== Publications ==
- The Fish-tail Monster in Greek and Etruscan Art (1940)
- "Antique Sculpture in Prints" (1969)

== Personal life and legacy ==
Shepard died in 1986, at the age of 81. There is a collection of her correspondence in the Bryn Mawr College Archives. The Katharine Shepard Fund at the National Gallery of Art is used to acquire 17th-century and 18th-century European prints. She left 87 acres of her family's land in Bristol to the Nature Conservancy; the Shepard parcel became part of the Harry C. Barnes Nature Center in 1988.
