= Connecticut Academic Performance Test =

American state-mandated standardized exam

The Connecticut Academic Performance Test, or simply the CAPT, was a state-mandated standardized test administered by the Connecticut State Board of Education that all public school students in Connecticut must take. The test is proctored to all students in their sophomore year; if the state goal is not met, students must retake the sections they do not pass until they meet goal. Students take the test in March.

The test covers four subjects—mathematics, reading, writing, and science—in nine individual sessions, which are taken over a period of nine days. Prior to testing, the state of Connecticut requires that students take scaled practice tests to allow them to be at ease when they take the real CAPT. The mock tests are actually prior CAPT tests that the state has released.

== CAPT disciplines ==
As of 2009, CAPT tests students on four curricular disciplines, which is broken down into nine individual tests.

=== Science ===
The Science portion of the CAPT is broken into two 55-minute test sessions entitled Science I and Science II. Types of questions included in the science tests include open-ended and multiple-choice questions. The science tests cover a wide range of topics: basic chemistry and physics; biology, including cell reproduction and structures; and earth science, among others.

=== Reading ===
The Reading section split into two tests: Reading for Information and Response to Literature. Both tests require the student to read various articles and respond to open-ended and multiple choice questions accordingly.

==== Response to Literature ====
Response to Literature requires the student to read a short story and answer four predetermined questions in a time of 70 minutes. Recently, the questions have been as follows:

1. Initial Understanding. What are your thoughts and questions about the story? You might reflect upon characters, their problems, the title, or other ideas in the story.
2. Interpretation. One of the following is given:
  1. Choose one of the following quotations from the story (three are given). Explain what you think the quotation means as it relates to elements of the story such as characters or theme, or
  2. How does the main character change from the beginning of the story to the end? What do you think causes the change?
3. Connection. What does this story say about people in general? In what ways does it remind you of people you have known or experiences you have had? You may also write about stories you have read or movies, works of art, or television shows you have seen. Use examples from the stories to explain your thinking.
4. Critical Stance. How successful was the author in creating a good piece of literature? Use examples from the story to explain your thinking.

The students have a total of 21 lines on which to complete each question. The questions are graded as a whole, meaning that the grade is affixed to the entire set of answers, not each individually. This section is graded on a scale from one to six; two scorers will read the answers and the final grade will be out of twelve. A score of nine is now required to meet state goal.

=== Writing ===
Writing comprises three test sessions on two subjects.

==== Interdisciplinary Writing ====
Interdisciplinary Writing is composed of two test sessions—Interdisciplinary Writing I and Interdisciplinary Writing II—taken on two separate days. Each session requires that you read two articles on a divisive issue and take a clear stance on the issue. Students are given three pages on which to write a persuasive letter on the stance that they have taken. It is required to use evidence from each of the two sources. The same procedure is repeated for the second day; a new topic is given.

==== Editing & Revising ====
Editing & Revising is a 25 minute session in which the student read short excerpts from stories and answer multiple choice questions accordingly. Questions usually relate to grammar, spelling, structure, etc.

=== Mathematics ===
The mathematics portion of CAPT is also broken into two sessions: Mathematics I and Mathematics II. In both tests, there is a section of open-ended questions in which the student must answer a question, explain their procedure, show their work, and sometimes draw a visual. The second portion of the tests are grid-ins; the student will answer a question and then bubble in his/her answer in the grid provided.
