= Hippocampus (mythology) =

Mythological creature in Phoenician and Greek mythology

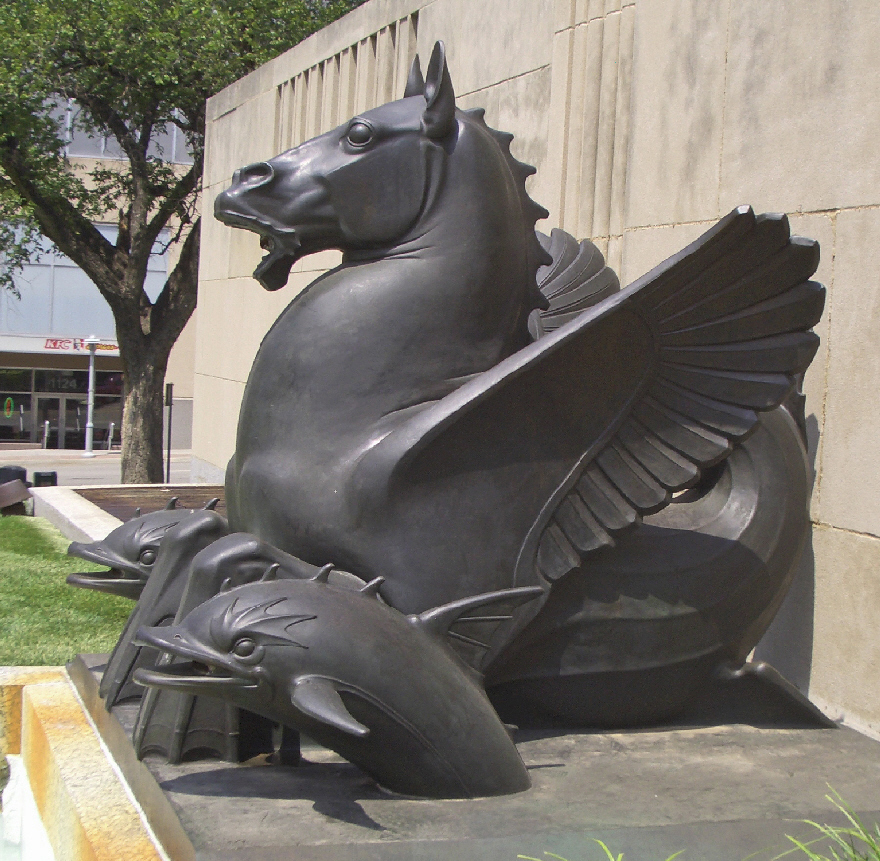
Winged hippocamp in an Art Deco fountain, Kansas City, Missouri, (1937)

The hippocampus, or hippocamp (pl. hippocampi – pl. hippocamps; Ancient Greek: ἱππόκαμπος, romanized: hippókampos, from ἵππος, 'horse', and κάμπος, 'sea monster'), is a mythological creature mentioned in Etruscan, Greek, Phoenician, Pictish and Roman mythologies, typically depicted as having the upper body of a horse with the lower body of a fish.

== Mythology ==
Coins minted at Tyre around the 4th century BC show the patron god Melqart riding on a winged hippocampus, accompanied by dolphins. Coins of the same period from Byblos show a hippocampus diving under a galley.

A gold hippocamp was discovered in a hoard from the kingdom of Lydia, Asia Minor, dating to the 6th century BC.

=== Greek and Roman ===
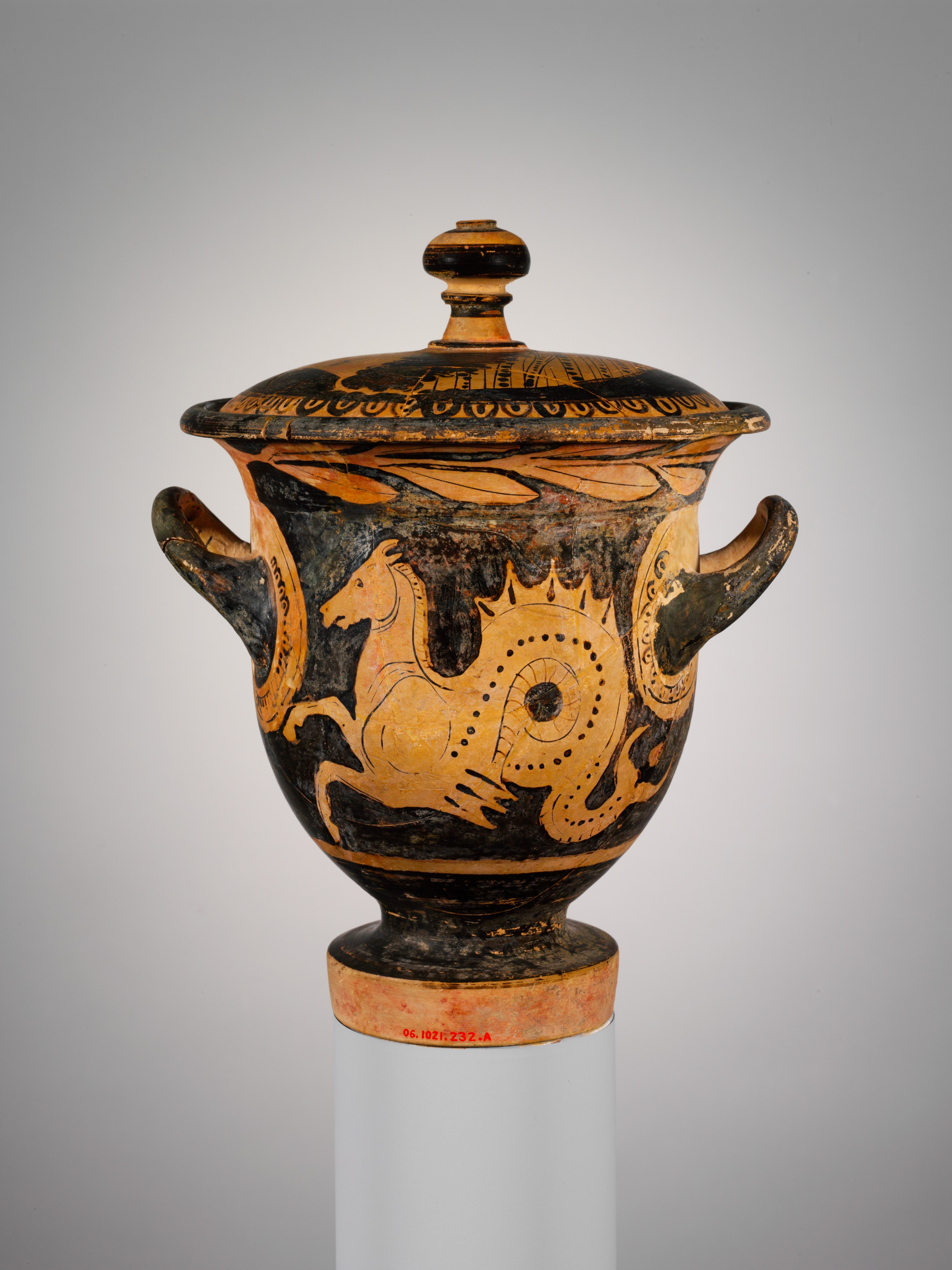
Terracotta bell-krater (mixing bowl) with lid, late 5th century BC

In the Iliad, Homer describes Poseidon—god of horses, earthquakes and oceans—driving a chariot drawn by brazen-hoofed horses over the ocean's surface. Similarly, Apollonius of Rhodes describes the horse of Poseidon as emerging from the sea and galloping across the Libyan sands. This compares to the specifically "two (cloven)-hoofed" hippocampi of Gaius Valerius Flaccus in his Argonautica: "Orion[,] when grasping his father's reins[,] heaves the sea with the snorting of his two-hooved horses." In Hellenistic and Roman imagery, however, Poseidon often drives a "sea-chariot", drawn by hippocampi. Thus, hippocampi sport with this god in both ancient depictions and much more modern ones, such as in the waters of the 18th-century Trevi Fountain in Rome, as surveyed by Neptune from his niche above.

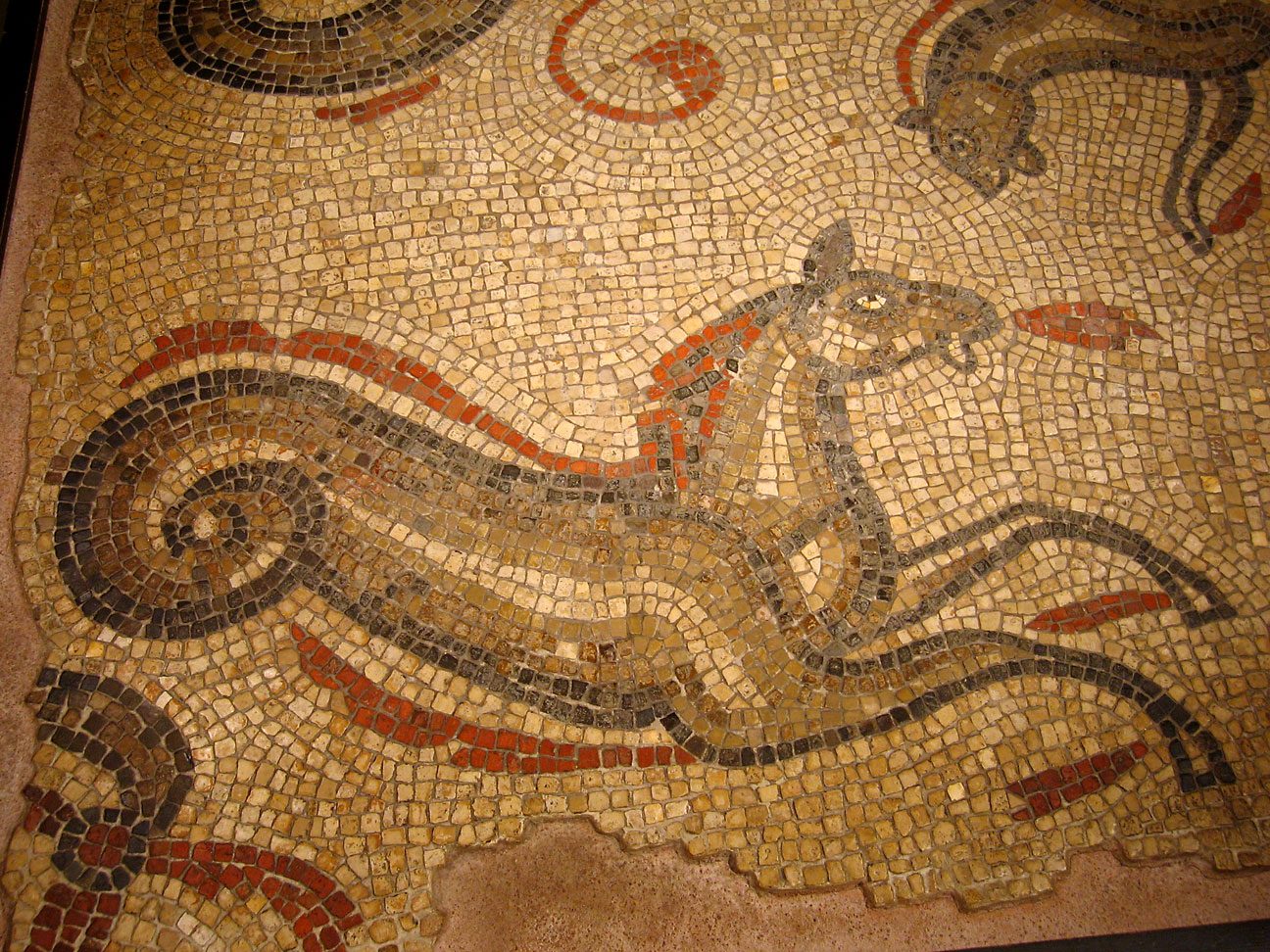
Hippocampus in Roman mosaic in the thermae at Aquae Sulis (Bath)

The appearance of hippocampi in both freshwater and saltwater is counterintuitive to a modern audience, though not to an ancient one, as the Greek concept of the natural hydrological cycle did not take into account the condensation of atmospheric water as precipitation to replenish the water table, but rather imagined the waters of the sea flowing back onto land through vast caverns and aquifers, rising replenished and freshened in springs.

Thus, it was natural for a temple at Helike, in the coastal plain of Achaea, to be dedicated to Poseidon Helikonios, or "the Poseidon of Helicon", the sacred spring of Boeotian Helikon. When an earthquake suddenly submerged the city, the temple's bronze Poseidon, accompanied by hippocampi, continued to snag fishermens' nets. Likewise, the hippocampus was considered an appropriate decoration for mosaics in Roman thermae and public baths, such as that seen at Aquae Sulis, in modern-day Bath, England (Britannia).

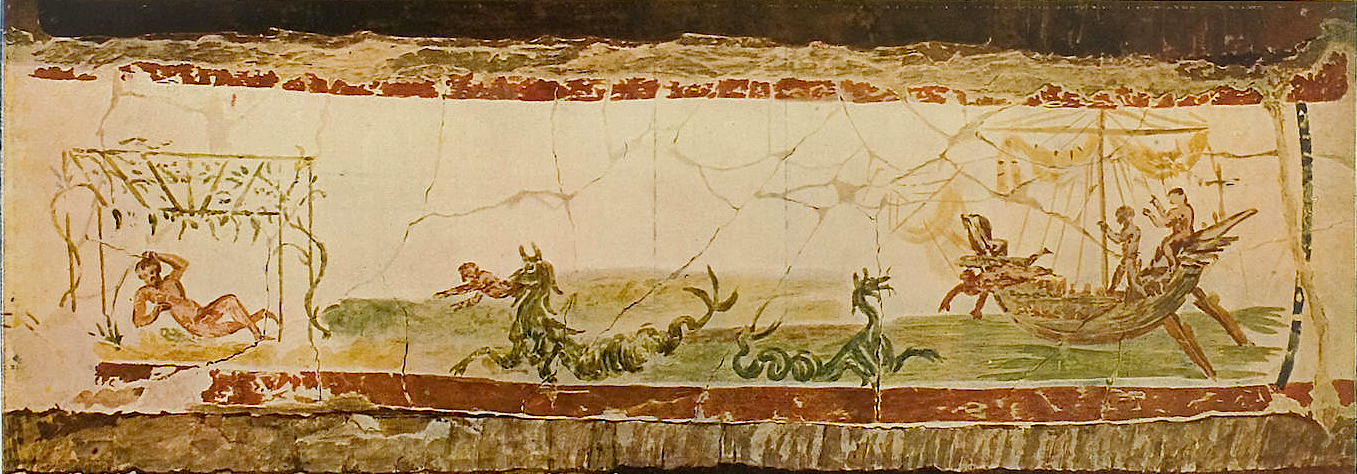
Jonah and the sea monster, from Christian artwork in Roman catacombs at the end of 2nd century A.D. The sea monster drawn by the Roman Christians resembles a hippocampus.

Poseidon's horses, which were included in the elaborate sculptural program of gilt-bronze and ivory added by a Roman client to the temple of Poseidon at Corinth, are likely to have been hippocampi; later on, the Romanised-Greek geographer Pausanias described the rich ensemble in the 2nd century AD (Geography of Greece ii.1.7-.8):

On the temple, which is not very large, stand bronze Tritons. In the fore-temple are images, two of Poseidon, a third of Amphitrite, and a Sea, which also is of bronze. The offerings inside were dedicated in our time by Herodes Atticus, four horses, gilded except for the hoofs, which are of ivory, and two gold Tritons beside the horses, with the parts below the waist of ivory. On the car stand Amphitrite and Poseidon, and there is the boy Palaemon upright upon a dolphin. These too are made of ivory and gold. On the middle of the base on which the car has been wrought a Sea holding up the young Aphrodite, and on either side are the nymphs called Nereids.

=== Etruscan ===
Hippocampi appear with the first Oriental phase of Etruscan civilization: they remain a theme in Etruscan tomb wall-paintings and reliefs, where they are sometimes provided with wings, as they are in the Trevi Fountain. Katharine Shepard found in the theme an Etruscan belief in a sea-voyage to the other world.

=== Medieval, Renaissance, and modern ===
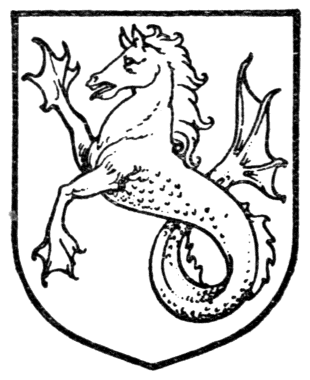
The "sea-horse" in medieval heraldry was a legendary creature that was part horse and part fish, not to be confused with the later heraldic hippocampus, which was a natural seahorse.

The mythic hippocampus has been used as a heraldic charge, particularly since the Renaissance, most often in the armorial bearings of people and places with maritime associations. However, in a blazon, the terms hippocamp and hippocampus now refer to the real animal called a seahorse, and the terms seahorse and sea-horse refer to the mythological creature. The above-mentioned fish hybrids are seen less frequently. In appearance, the heraldic sea-horse is depicted as having the head and neck of a horse, the tail of a fish and webbed paws replacing its front hooves. Its mane may be that of a horse or it may be replaced with an additional fin. Sea-horses may be depicted with wings, and winged sea-horses with a horn were part of the armorial bearings granted to Sir Sean Connery in 2018 by the Lord Lyon King of Arms, the head of Scotland's heraldic authority.

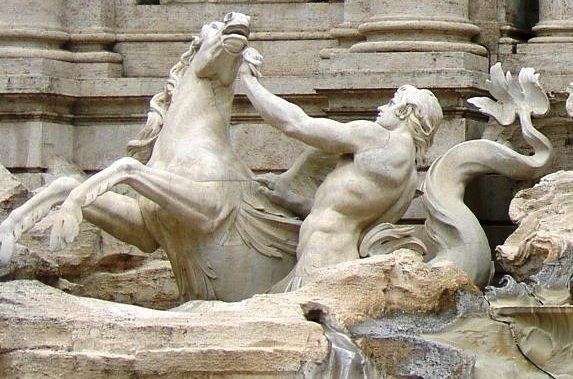
Triton and a winged hippocampus in the Trevi Fountain, Rome

The sea-horse is also a common image in Renaissance and Baroque art, for example, in the Trevi Fountain, dating to 1732.

A winged hippocampus has been used as a symbol for Air France since its establishment in 1933 (inherited from its predecessor Air Orient); it appears today on the engine nacelles of Air France aircraft.

Bronze hippocampi appear in Dublin, Leinster, Ireland on lampposts next to a statue of Henry Grattan and on Grattan Bridge.

The English football club Newcastle United has two hippocampi depicted on its crest. They appear to the left and right of the shield in the middle. The Civic Centre in Newcastle-upon-Tyne is also adorned with hippocampi at the top of its central tower.

== Capricornus and related mythical animals ==
Closely related to the hippocampus is the "sea goat", represented by Capricorn, a mythical creature with the front half of a goat and the rear half of a fish. Canonical figures, most of which were not themselves cult images, and coins of the Carian goddess associated with Aphrodite as the Aphrodite of Aphrodisias through interpretatio graeca, show the goddess riding on a sea-goat. Brody describes her thus:

... a semi-nude female figure appears riding on a sea-goat, accompanied by a dolphin and a Triton. This is the goddess Aphrodite herself, shown here not in her distinctive local guise but in a more traditionally Hellenistic style. She is the marine aspect of Aphrodite, known to the Greeks as Aphrodite Pelagia .... She rides on a fantastic marine creature with the body and tail of a fish and the forepart of a goat. This sea-goat moves to the right and turns his head back to look at the goddess. This group also appears on Aphrodisian coins from the 3rd century A.D.

Aside from aigikampoi, the fish-tailed goats representing Capricorn, other fish-tailed animals rarely appeared in Greek art, but are more characteristic of the Etruscans. These include leokampoi (fish-tailed lions), taurokampoi (fish-tailed bulls) or pardalokampoi (fish-tailed leopards).

The combination of a horse and a fish was also evoked in the concept of an Ichthyocentaur, which replaced the head and neck of the horse portion with the upper body of a man, akin instead to the more widespread hippocentaur. Icthyocentaurs appeared in ancient visual art from the 2nd century BC onward, though the name was not coined until the Middle Ages.

== Astronomy ==
A small moon of Neptune, discovered in July 2013, was named for the mythological creature in February 2019.

== See also ==
- List of horses in mythology and folklore
- List of hybrid creatures in mythology
- Capricorn (astrology)
- Sea goat
- Catoblepas
- Kelpie
- Unicorn
- Water horse
- Sea horse
