= Albert Rockwell =

American inventor, manufacturer, industrialist and philanthropist (1862–1925)

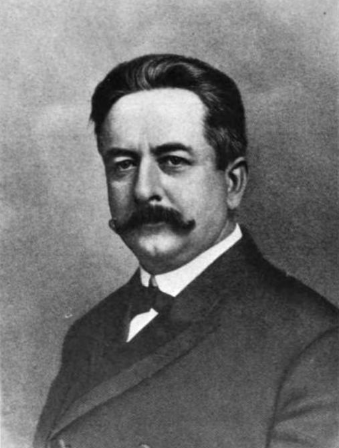

Member of the Connecticut House of Representatives
- In office 1907, 1909
- Constituency: Bristol

Personal details
- Born: Albert Fenimore Rockwell; April 8, 1862 Woodhull, New York, U.S.
- Died: February 16, 1925 (aged 62) New Britain, Connecticut, U.S.

Albert Fenimore Rockwell (April 8, 1862 – February 16, 1925) was an American inventor, manufacturer, industrialist, and philanthropist. He was the founder of the New Departure Manufacturing Company, which later became a division of General Motors. Rockwell was also the founder of the Yellow Taxicab Company of New York, president of the American Silver Company, and owner of Marlin Firearms, which manufactured Marlin-Rockwell machine guns and automatic rifles during the First World War.

== Early life ==
Albert Rockwell was born to Fidelia Locke Rockwell and Leander Rockwell in Woodhull, New York. He had three brothers, Frank, Edward, and George, and one sister, Mae.

== Industrialist ==
Rockwell and his brother Edward moved to Bristol in 1888 and founded the New Departure Bell Company. In 1901, the company was renamed New Departure Manufacturing Company.

== Philanthropist ==
In 1911, Rockwell donated 80 acres (32 ha) of land adjoining his Brightwood Hall residence for the construction of Rockwell Park, which was the city's only public park until 1933. Rockwell donated an additional 15 acres (6.1 ha) in 1920 for a playground in the park.

In 1919, Rockwell donated 12 acres (4.9 ha) of undeveloped land, formerly known as Dunbar Meadows, to the city of Bristol for the construction of a new high school, athletic fields, and tennis courts, as well as a roadway leading into the city’s downtown. Rockwell had been strongly influenced by both the Beaux-Arts European beautification style and "The City Beautiful Movement," which both stressed ornamental landscape design, aesthetic physical design, and wide grand avenues. He donated 50% of the construction costs and accepted a non-paid position as supervising head of the operation. Pin oak trees, financed by Albert F. Rockwell, were planted on both sides of the boulevard to honor each Bristol resident who had died in the service of his country.

On January 30, 1923 the formal opening of the Memorial Boulevard School took place with Albert Rockwell, Mayor John F. Wade, Board of Ed. Chairman Noble Pierce, Principal Henry Cottle, Former Mayor Joseph F. Dutton, Judge R.S. Newell, and over three thousand audience members in attendance. In his speech, Chairman Pierce stated,

The Honor of the city will dwell here; this building will give fame and glory to the city. It will hold here, and attract here, citizens of the very best class. It adds strength to all businesses and value to all property, every farm is richer, every piece of real estate in the city is worth more. The business of every merchant will be better. Relations between labor and capital in our manufactories will be more harmonious, the churches will be stronger and life in this city richer and better because of this building.

== Politics ==
Rockwell represented Bristol in the Connecticut House of Representatives in 1907 and 1909.

== Family ==
Rockwell's first marriage was to Nettie Louise Beebe, with whom he had three children: Bernice Louise; Leander Waite; and Hugh Monroe. He later married Nettie Williams Brown.

His son Hugh M. Rockwell (1890-1957) was an early Connecticut aviator and the co-inventor of the Rockwell Hardness Tester, a standard fixture in metallurgical laboratories around the world since the 1920s.

== Residence ==
In 1911, Rockwell purchased Brightwood Hall in Bristol, a 21-room gothic stone mansion designed in the spirit of an English manor house. Following his death in 1925, the property was sold for development and the building's stone, marble, and bronze was used to construct St. Ann's Roman Catholic Church in New Britain.
