= Gediz =

Gediz may refer to:

- Gediz, Kütahya, a town in the Kütahya Province of Turkey
- Gediz District, a district of the Kütahya Province of Turkey
- Gediz River, a river in the Aegean region of Turkey
