= Eskigediz =

- Municipality
- Location in Turkey Eskigediz (Turkey Aegean)
- Coordinates: 39°02′20″N 29°24′48″E
- Country: Turkey
- Province: Kütahya
- District: Gediz
- Population (2022): 2,768
- Time zone: UTC+3 (TRT)

Eskigediz is a town (belde) in the Gediz District, Kütahya Province, Turkey. Its population is 2,768 (2022). Eskigediz is the old site of Gediz, and has a history dating back to antiquity; the new town now called Gediz was built from scratch after Eskigediz was destroyed by the 1970 Gediz earthquake.

== Geography ==
Eskigediz is located on the upper reaches of the Gediz Çayı, 7 km from the new town of Gediz and 65 km southwest of the city of Kütahya. The town is located on hilly terrain, and just east of the town is a hill known as Hisarardı Kale, which is where the settlement originated. The Eskigediz area was historically strategically significant because it controls the only pass through the Murat Dağ mountains.

== History ==
Until 1970, Eskigediz was simply called Gediz. After the town was destroyed in the 1970 Gediz earthquake, it was rebuilt from scratch at a site called Karılar Pazarı on the plain below. The name Gediz was transferred to the new settlement.

The ancient and medieval Kadoi (Ancient Greek: Κάδοι) was located immediately east of Eskigediz, on a hilltop now called Hisarardı Kale. To the east and south of the hill is a plateau which was historically used as a marble quarry; stone from here was used as building material that was later reused as spolia. Remains of an ancient aqueduct are the oldest intact structure at Eskigediz; two ancient marble statues were also reused as spolia in the later Debboy bridge.

Kadoi's earliest known mention was by Polybios in the 2nd century BCE. In Roman times, the town was located in Phrygia Epiktetos, near the border of Phrygia, Mysia, and Lydia. (The sources for this period are Strabo, Stephanus of Byzantium, and Ptolemy.) The 6th-century Synekdemos of Hierokles later mentions Kadoi as part of Phrygia Pakatiane. Kadoi was also a Christian diocese attested consistently from the 7th through 12th centuries in the Notitiae. Until around the 9th century, it was listed as subordinate to Laodikeia, and after that as under Hierapolis until the 12th century.

Gediz (i.e. present-day Eskigediz) was administered as a sanjak under the Seljuk dynasty as well as the succeeding Germiyan beylik. The oldest mosque in what is now Eskigediz, the Umurbey mosque (also called the Serdar mosque), dates from the Seljuk period.

Gediz appears to have come under Ottoman control by 1414. The source for this is a stone inscription from 1414, commemorating the endowment of a külliye complex in Kütahya by the last Germiyan bey, Yakub II. The inscription includes a reference to Yakub acquiring the village of Ilıcasu, subordinate to Gediz, for endowing the külliye. The inscription then mentions that the reigning Ottoman sultan, Mehmed I, signed off on these transactions, which, according to Mustafa Çetin Varlık, indicates that the places mentioned were under Ottoman administration by then. This inscription mentions Gediz as Gedüs, which is an older Turkish spelling of the name.

Two mosques in present-day Eskigediz were built under Ottoman auspices in the 1500s. The first was the Kurşunlu Cami, built in 1540 by one Mustafa bin Hamza. It was the first domed mosque in Gediz. The second was the Ulu Cami, built in 1589/90 (998 AH) on a commission from Gazanfer Ağa, who was Kapı Ağa under the Ottoman sultan Murad III. Several other foundations in Gediz by Gazanfer Ağa, who was a native of the town, are known, including a hamam, a han, and a madrasa. The Ulu Cami was almost completely destroyed by the earthquake of 1970 and rebuilt in 1990. Its original architecture was typical of early classical Ottoman architecture.

Also in the 1500s, the Tapu Defter #438, from the reign of Süleyman the Magnificent, listed Gediz as a nahiye in the Sanjak of Kütahya. It was later reclassified as a kaza in the late 1800s.

Evliya Çelebi visited Gediz in the 1600s and left an account of the town (which he also wrote as Gedüs) in his Seyahatnâme. He attributed the town's name to a king of Rum named Gedüs. He wrote that the town was a zeamet with 13 neighborhoods and about 2,000 houses, which were covered with earthen roofs. It had 20 mosques; he specifically referred to the Hacı Mustafa mosque, which he called the old mosque, and the Gazanfer Ağa mosque in the town bazar. The castle, which he wrote was locally called "Canbaz Kale", had recently been destroyed – he mentioned that in 1676, during the Celali revolts, one Kuyucu Murad Paşa had ordered its destruction to prevent the rebels from being able to use it. Evliya also wrote that supposedly, once every 30 years, "a famous group of acrobats" would come to Gediz and climb to the top of the castle rock with ropes.

At the end of the Ottoman period, Ali Cevad wrote that Gediz (i.e. Eskigediz) had partly derived its prosperity from its trade connection with İzmir. He also noted that the town's houses were covered with black clay soil, which he said gave the town a "depressing" appearance.
