= 2nd Main Jet Base Command (Turkey) =

2nd Main Jet Command Base
- 2. Ana Jet Üssü
- Country: Turkey
- Allegiance: Air Training Command
- Role: Pilot Training
- Size: Division
- Garrison/HQ: Çiğli, İzmir

Commanders
- commander: Brigadier General Cihangir Kemal Yüzçelik

2nd Main Jet Base Command (Turkish: 2. Ana Jet Üssü) is a Turkish training base. It includes Çiğli Air Base and Kaklıç Air Base. Officers who graduate from the Air Force Academy receive basic and jet flight training after completing initial flights on the T-41 aircraft. It is a part of Turkey's Air Training Command. Its headquarters are in Çiğli, İzmir.

== Training ==
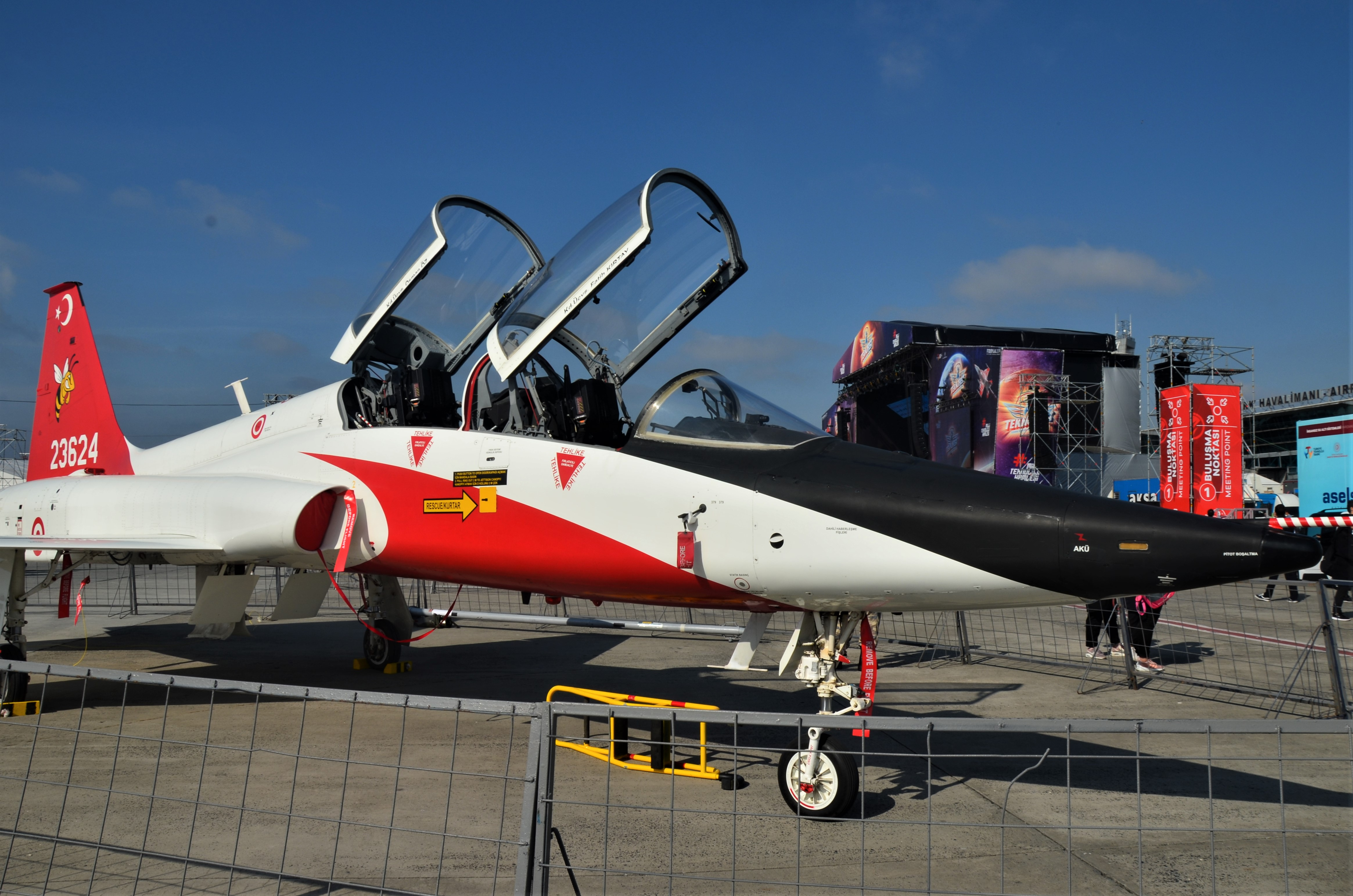
T-38M Talon jet.

Pilot training has three phases:

- Academic information
- Synthetic (Simulation) training
- Flight training

Prior to entering the Air Force Academy, cadets begin their training with the Pre-Selection Flight (ÖSÜ, Öğrenci Seçme Uçuşu), followed by orientation flights at the academy. Training starts on T-41D aircraft, during which cadets complete 13 sorties with an instructor. The 14th sortie is flown solo, followed by 15 solo sorties. Additionally, cadets complete 7 sorties using gliders.

During the Initial Flight Training phase, cadets are assigned to the 123rd Squadron ("Palaz") at Kalkış Air Base, under the 2nd Main Jet Base Command. There, candidates complete 25 sorties (approximately 30 flight hours) over a period of 5 months, using SF-260D and Super Mushshak aircraft. Then, they are transferred to the 122nd Squadron ("Akrep") at Çiğli Air Base, where they fly 75 sorties (roughly 100 flight hours) with KT-1T aircraft over the course of 6 months.

Candidates who successfully complete these stages move on to the 121st Squadron ("Arı") for Advanced Jet Training, where they log 85 to 90 sorties (about 110 flight hours) on T-38M aircraft over another 6-month period. The entire training process takes around 17 months. Those who complete it successfully earn the title of jet pilot and are assigned to operational units.

In the near future, TAI Hürjet will replace T-38M's as training jets.

== Squadrons ==
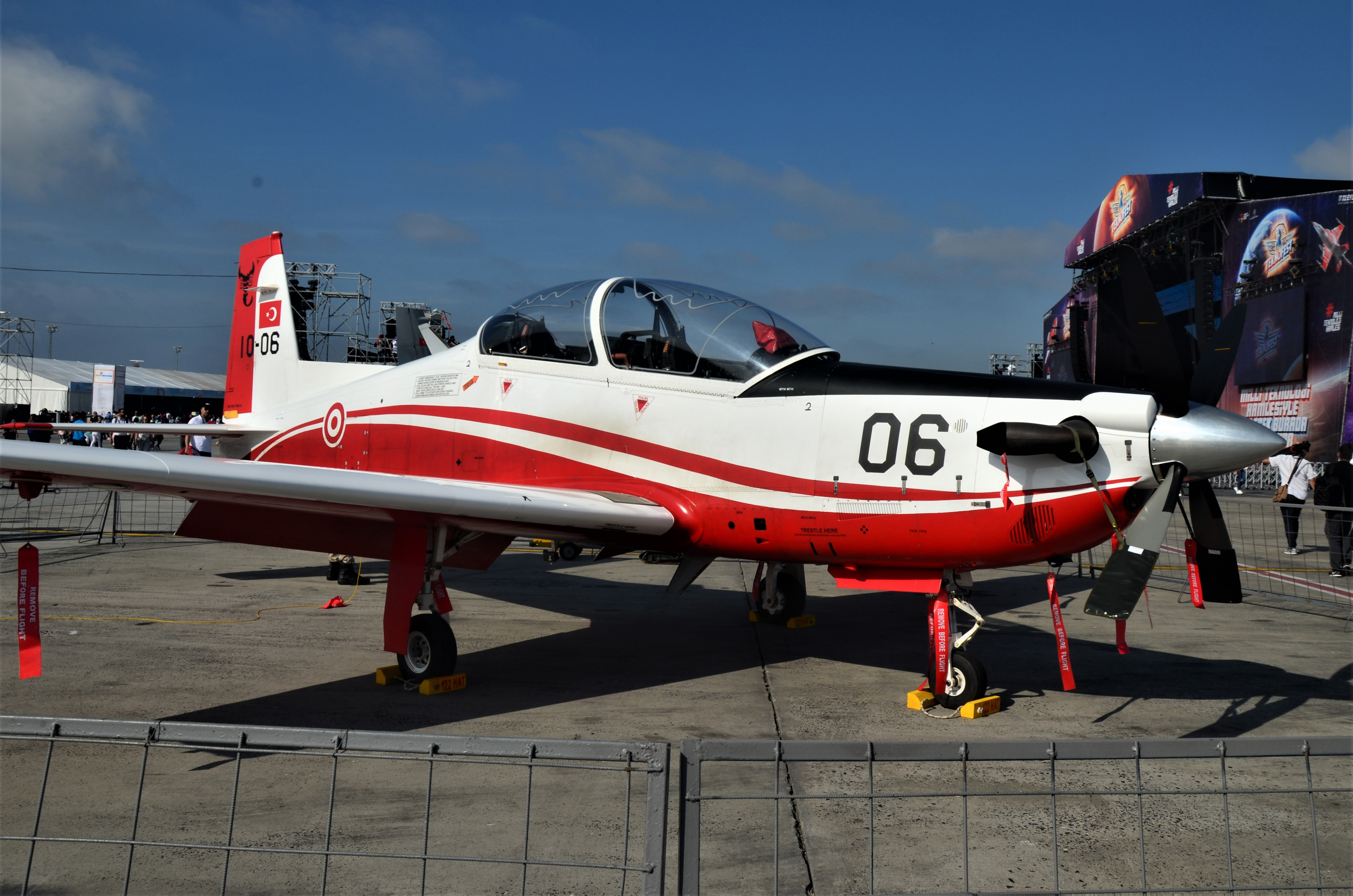
KAI KT-1T in 2nd Main Jet Base.

- 121st Squadron (Arı)
- 122nd Squadron (Akrep)
- 123rd Squadron (Palaz) [tr]
- 124th Squadron (Öncü)
- 125th Squadron (Azman)
