= Aizanoi =

Ancient Greek city in western Anatolia

- Αἰζανοί (Greek); Aezani (Latin)
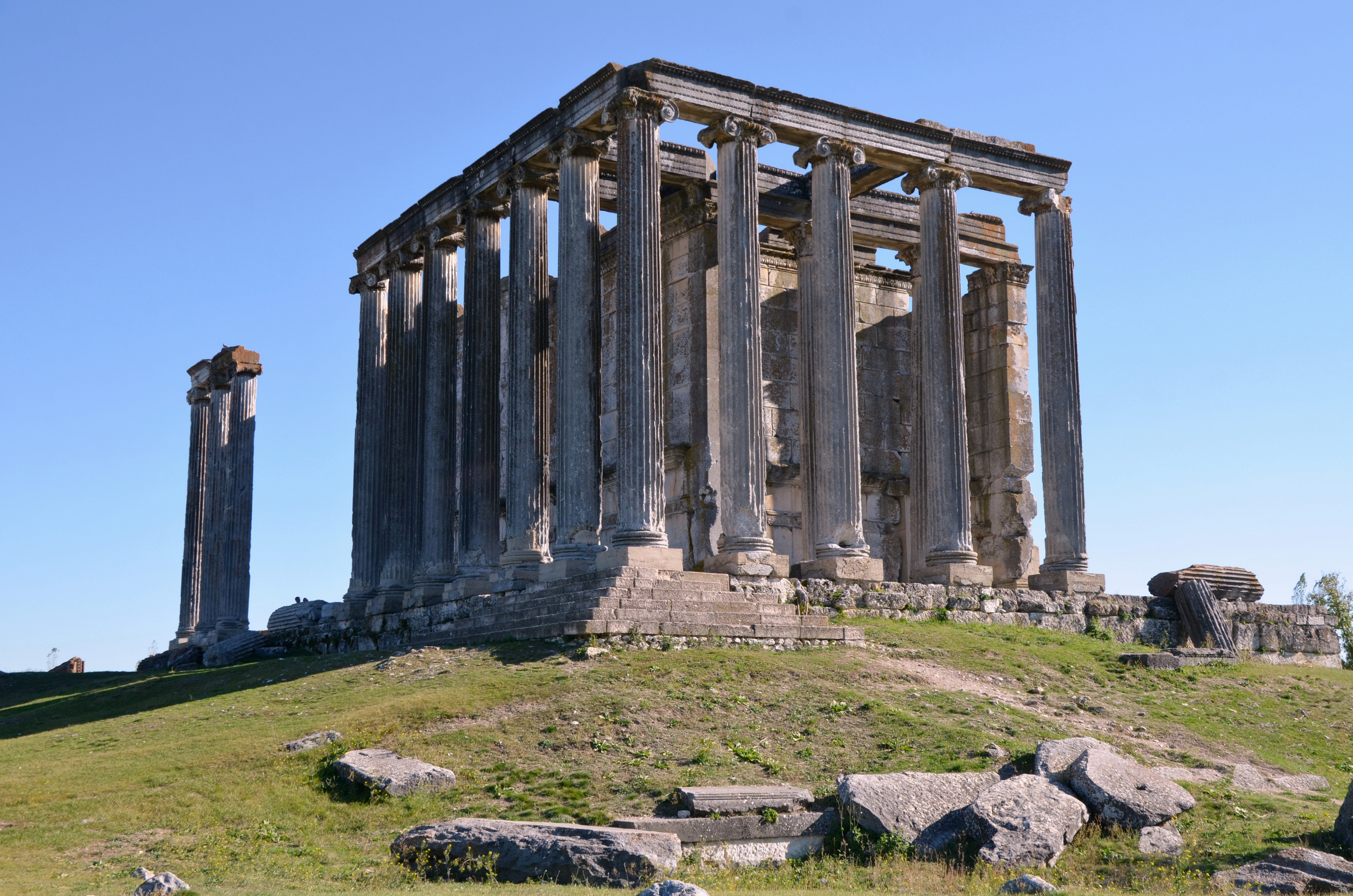
- Temple of Zeus in Aizanoi

- Location within Turkey
- 39°12′N 29°37′E
- Type: Settlement
- Periods: Roman Imperial
- Location: Çavdarhisar, Kütahya Province, Turkey
- Region: Phrygia

Aizanoi (Ancient Greek: Αἰζανοί), Latinized as Aezani, was an Ancient Greek city in western Anatolia. It was located at the site of the modern village of Çavdarhisar, near Kütahya, on both sides of the Penkalas river, c. 1,000 m (3,300 ft) above sea level. The city was an important political and economic centre in Roman times; surviving remains from the period include a well-preserved Temple of Zeus, a combined theatre-stadium complex, and a round building, probably a macellum, inscribed with a copy of the Price Edict of Diocletian. The city fell into decline in Late Antiquity. In 2012 the site was submitted for inclusion on the UNESCO World Heritage List.

== History ==
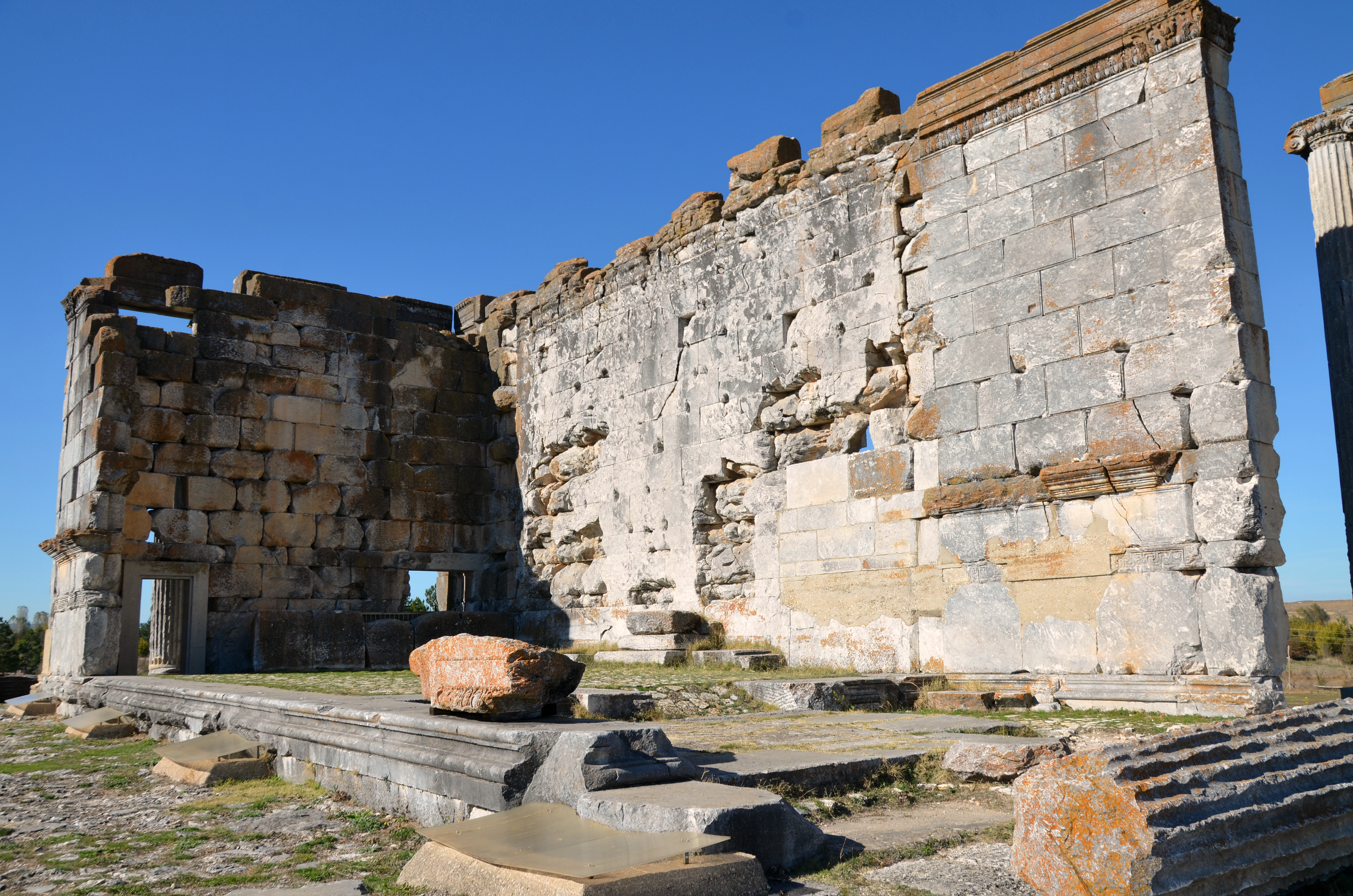
Ruins of Aizanoi

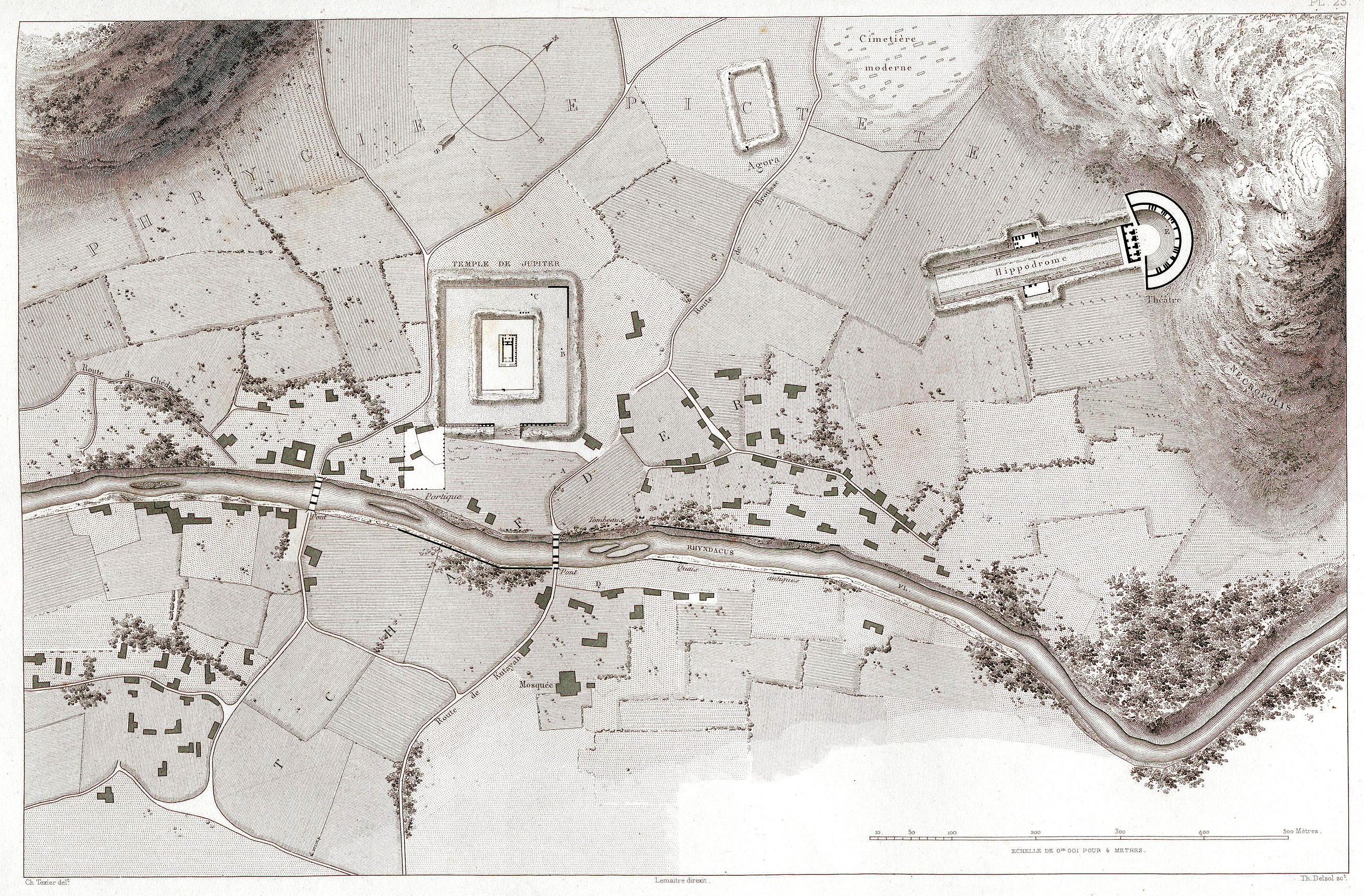
Map of ancient Aizanoi and the modern village of Çavdarhisar, c. 1835.

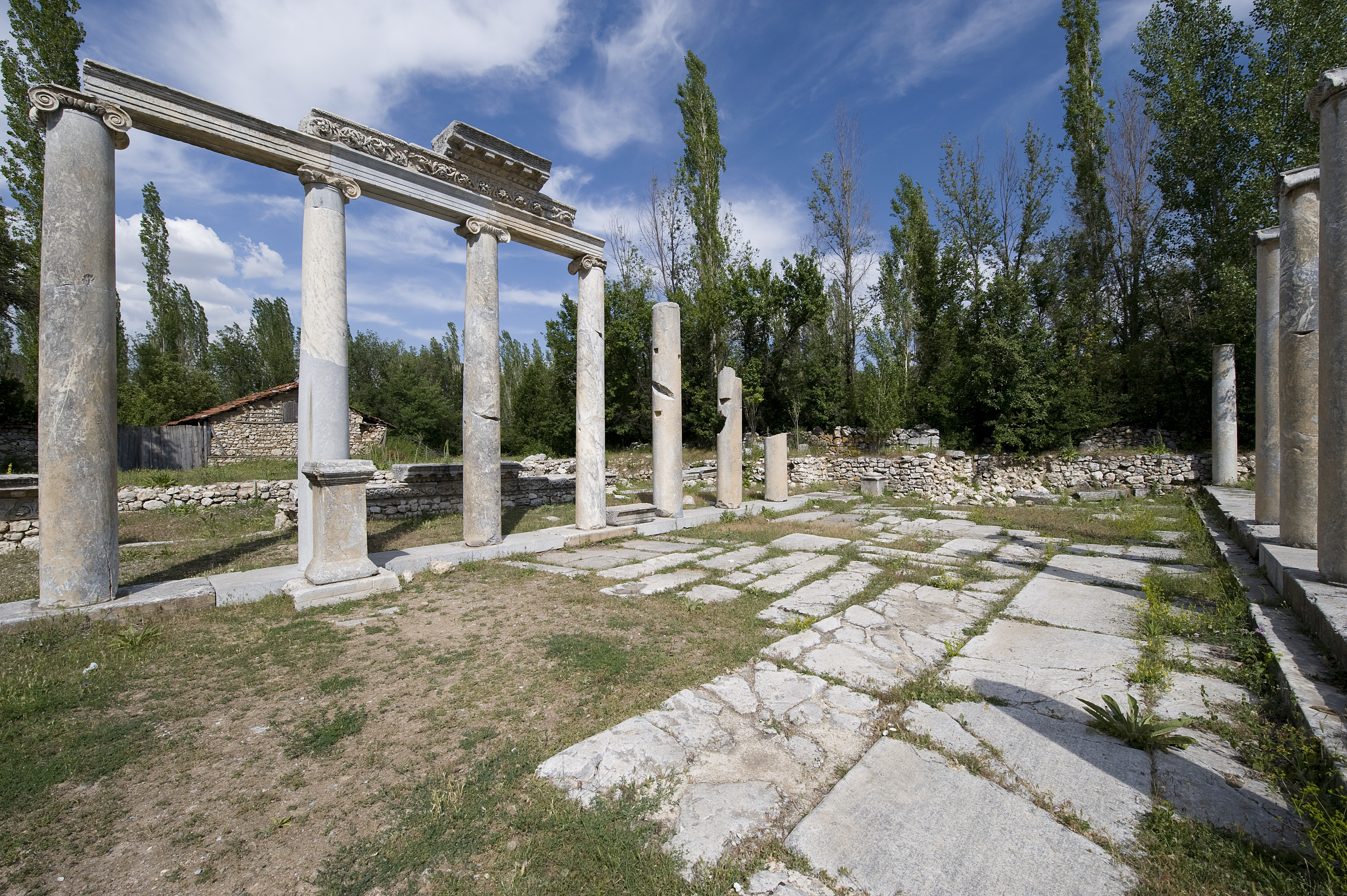
Colonnaded street in Aizanoi

Settlement in the area is known from the Bronze Age. The city may have derived its name from Azan, one of three sons of Arcas and the nymph Erato, legendary ancestors of the Phrygians. During the Hellenistic period the city changed hands between the Kingdom of Pergamum and the Kingdom of Bithynia, before being bequeathed to Rome by the former in 133 BC. It continued to mint its own coins. Its monumental buildings date from the early Empire to the 3rd century.

Aezani was part of the Roman province of Phrygia Pacatiana. It became a Christian bishopric at an early stage, and its bishop Pisticus (or Pistus) was a participant at the First Council of Nicaea, the first ecumenical council, in 325. Bishop Pelagius was at a synod that Patriarch John II of Constantinople hastily organized in 518 and that condemned Severus of Antioch; he was also at the Second Council of Constantinople in 553. Bishop Gregory was at the Trullan Council of 692, John at the Second Council of Nicaea in 787, and Theophanes at both the Council of Constantinople (869) and the Council of Constantinople (879). The bishopric was at first a suffragan of Laodicea but, when Phrygia Pacatiana was divided into two provinces, it found itself a suffragan of Hierapolis, the capital of the new province of Phrygia Pacatiana II. No longer a residential bishopric, Aezani is today listed by the Catholic Church as a titular see.

After the 7th century, Aezani fell into decline. Later, in Seljuk times, the temple hill was converted into a citadel (Turkish: hisar) by Çavdar Tatars, after which the recent settlement of Çavdarhisar is named. The ruins of Aezani/Aizanoi were noted by European travellers in 1824. Survey work in the 1830s and 1840s was followed by systematic excavation conducted by the German Archaeological Institute from 1926, resumed in 1970, and still ongoing.

In January 2021, archaeologists led by Dr. Elif Özer from Pamukkale University announced that they had discovered a cache containing 651 Roman coins dated about 2,100 years ago in a jug buried near a stream. Researchers revealed a jug firstly in 2019. 439 pieces of coins were denarius (ancient Roman coins minted on silver), and 212 were cistophori, silver coins from Pergamum. Caesar, Brutus, Mark Antony and (young) Augustus are engraved on the mostly well-preserved coins. The find is going on display in the Museum of Anatolian Civilizations.

In August 2021, archaeologists from Dumlupinar University announced the discovery of a statue of Hygieia. The human-sized statue is portrayed with a snake in its arms. The statue was revealed inside the columned gallery which runs throughout the south wing of the agora.

In December 2021, archaeologists discovered a marble statue of Heracles.

== Ancient buildings and structures ==
=== Temple of Zeus ===
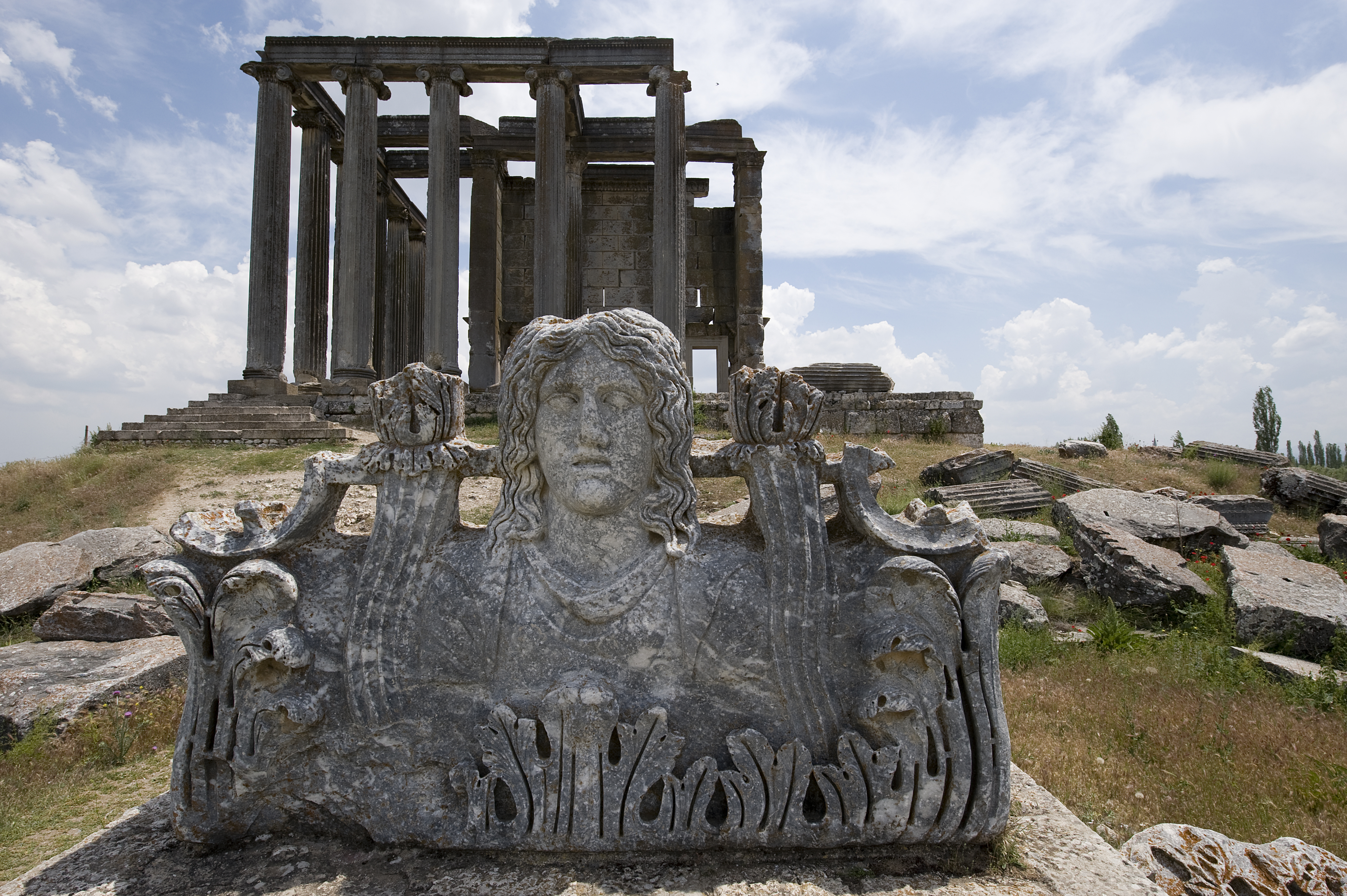
Acroterion with Temple of Zeus in the background

The Temple of Zeus, situated upon a hill, was the city's main sanctuary. Ceramic finds indicate local habitation from the first half of the third millennium BC. According to a recent reading of the inscription on the eastern architrave, the temple was dedicated during the reign of Domitian, in either AD 92 or AD 94/5. Inscriptions document imperial assistance from Hadrian relating to the recovery of unpaid rents as well as the euergetism of Marcus Apuleius Eurykles. Later the Çavdar Tatars carved equestrian and battle scenes on the temple. The temple is pseudodipteral, with eight columns at the ends and fifteen along the sides (35 m × 53 m (115 ft × 174 ft)). It was damaged by the 1970 Gediz earthquake and has since been restored.

=== Theatre and stadium ===
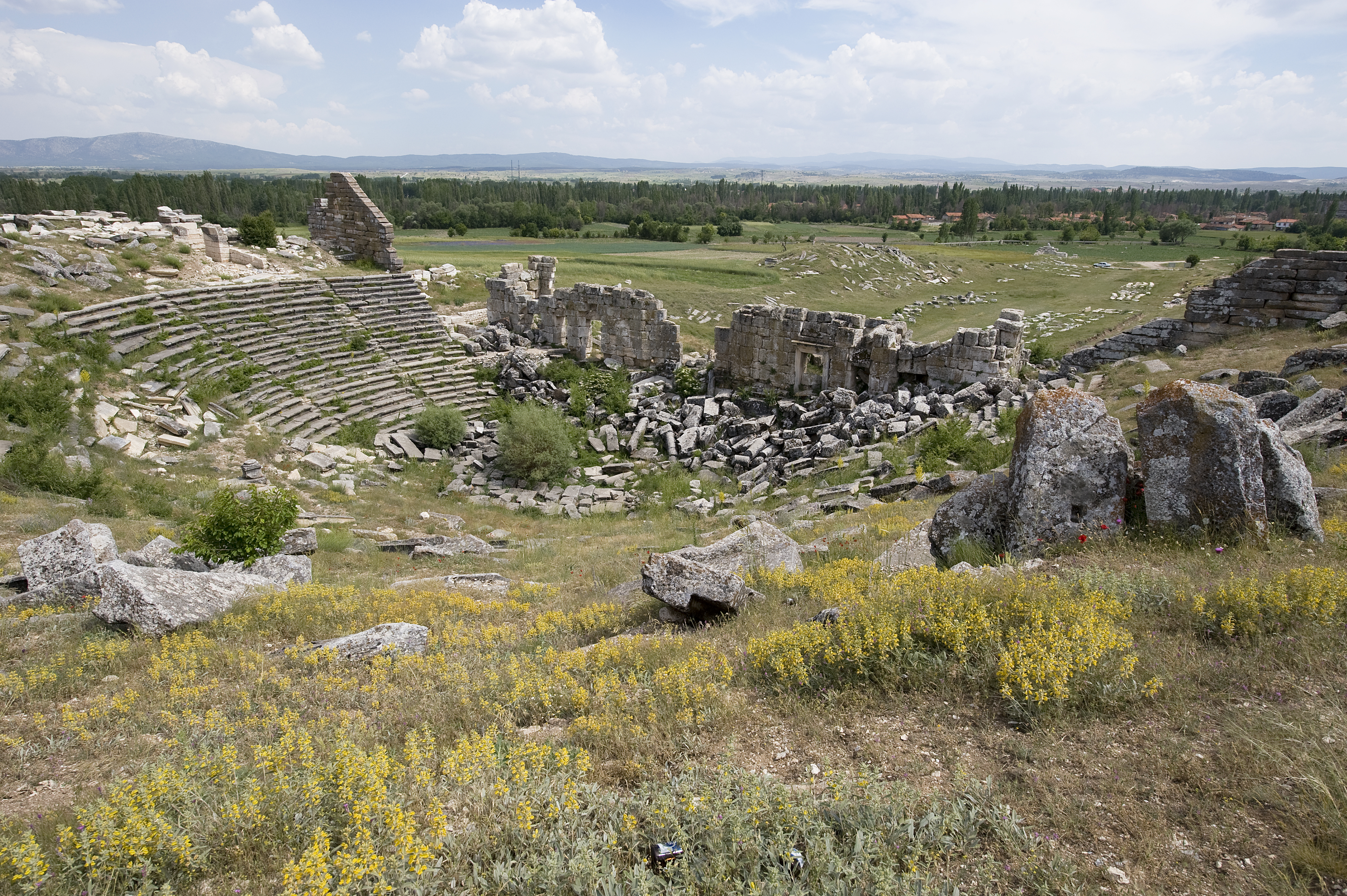
Theatre-stadium complex

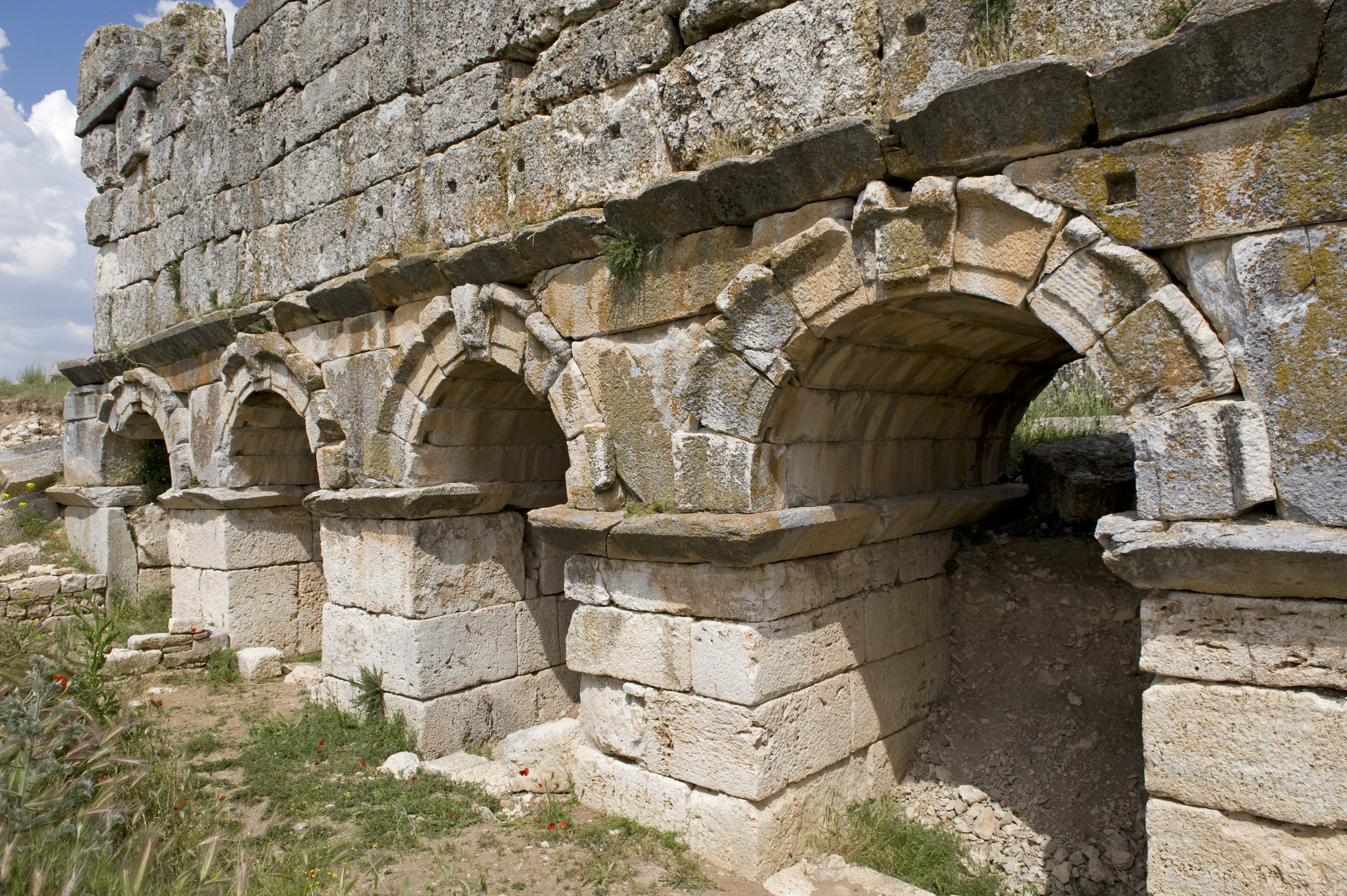
South end of the stadium complex

Aizanoi's theatre and stadium are built adjacent to each other and this combined complex is said to be unique in the ancient world. Separating the two is the stage building. Construction began after 160 A.D. and was complete by the mid-third century. Inscriptions again attest to the benefaction of M. Apuleius Eurycles.

=== Baths ===
Two sets of thermae have been identified. The first, between the theatre-stadium and the temple, dates to the second half of the second century and includes a palaestra and marble furnishings. The second, in the north-east of the city, was built a century later; floor mosaics depict a satyr and maenad. Rebuilt a couple of centuries later, it served as the bishop's seat.

=== Market ===
Aizanoi is the first recorded place in the world where inflation was calculated and from there spread to other cities of the Roman Empire.

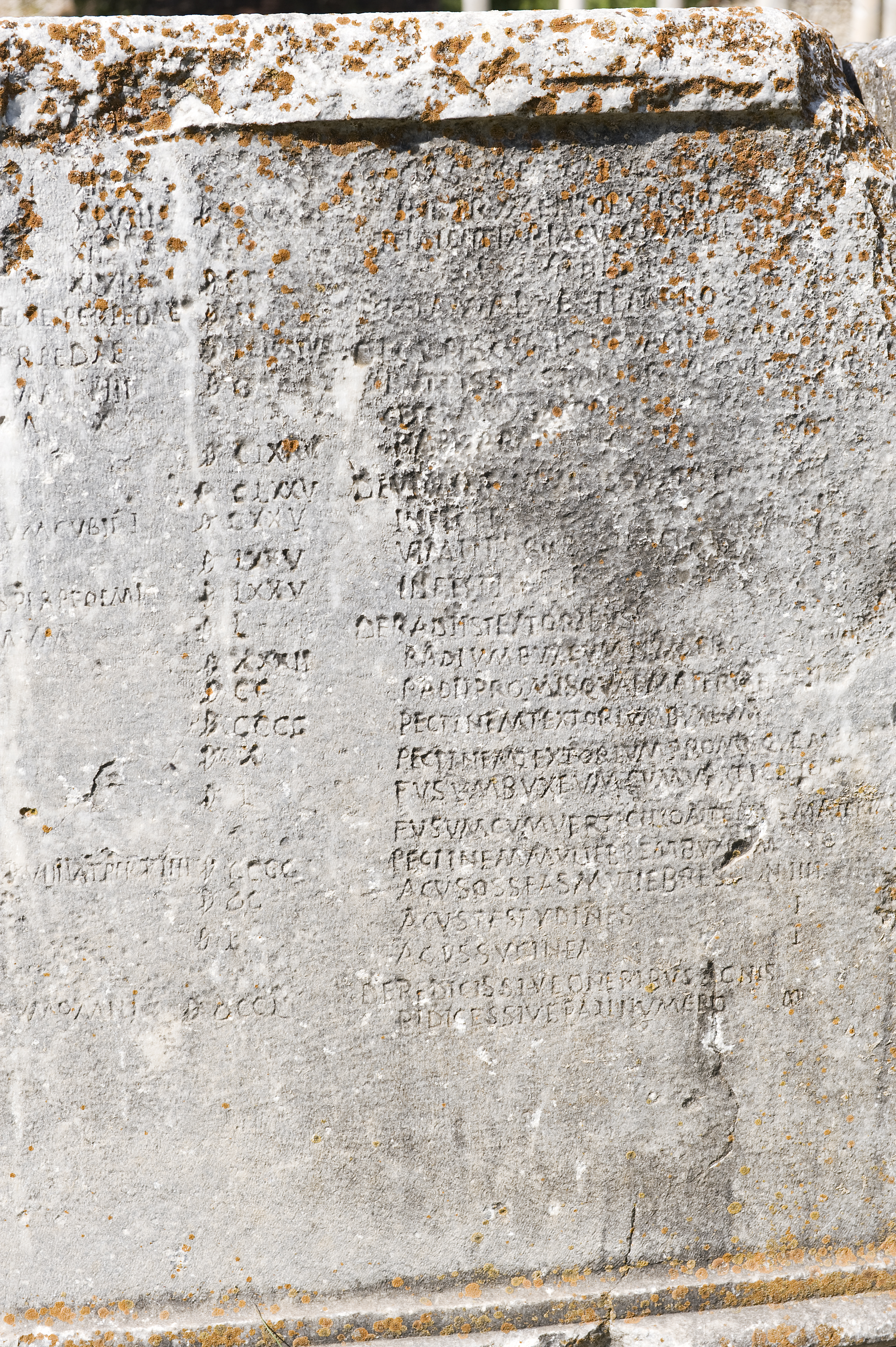
Macellum, inscribed with the Price Edict of Diocletian

A circular macellum dating to the second half of the second century is located in the south. In the fourth century it was inscribed with a copy of the Price Edict of Diocletian, dating to 301, an attempt to limit inflation resulting from debasement of the coinage.

=== Colonnaded street and stoa ===
Recent excavations have revealed the existence of a stoa, or covered walkway, dating to ca. 400 AD, and colonnaded street. A Temple of Artemis, dating to the time of Claudius (41-54), was demolished to make way for the colonnaded street which ran for 450 m (1,480 ft) and led to the sanctuary of Meter Steunene.

=== Sanctuary of Meter Steunene ===
A deep tunnel inside a cave, now collapsed, was dedicated to Meter Steunene (an Anatolian Earth Mother goddess). Cult figurines made of clay have been found in excavations, along with two round pits apparently used for animal sacrifice.

=== Necropolis ===
The city's large necropolis includes examples of door-shaped Phrygian tombstones. Inscriptions give the names of deceased or donor; accompanying decoration includes, for the tombs of men, bulls, lions and eagles, and for those of women, baskets of wool and a mirror.

== Museum of Kütahya ==
Some items from Aizanoi, among them a sarcophagus with an Amazonomachy, have been removed to the Archaeological Museum of Kütahya.

== Gallery ==
Pillar of the Temple of Zeus

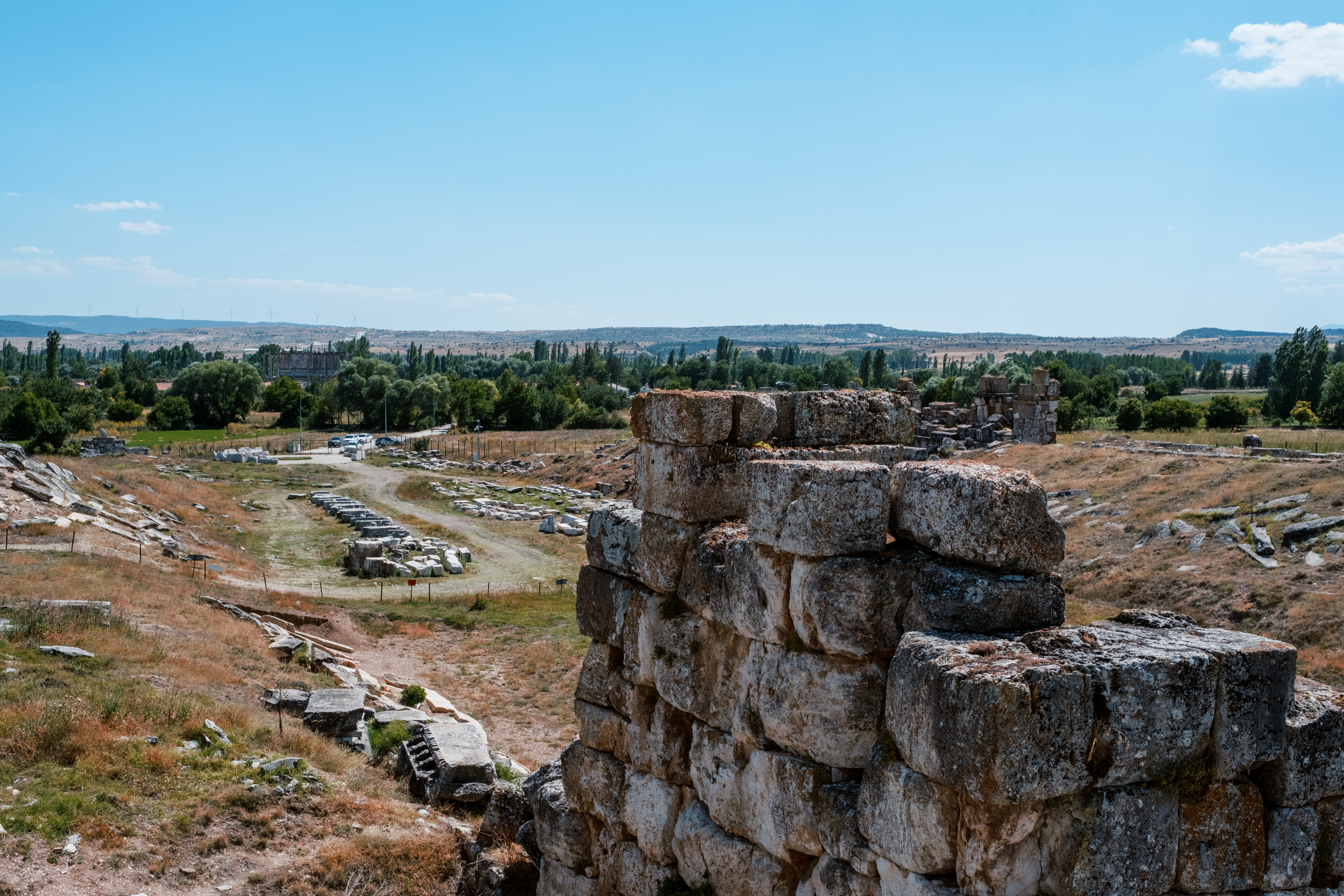
View of the stadium, as seen from the theater

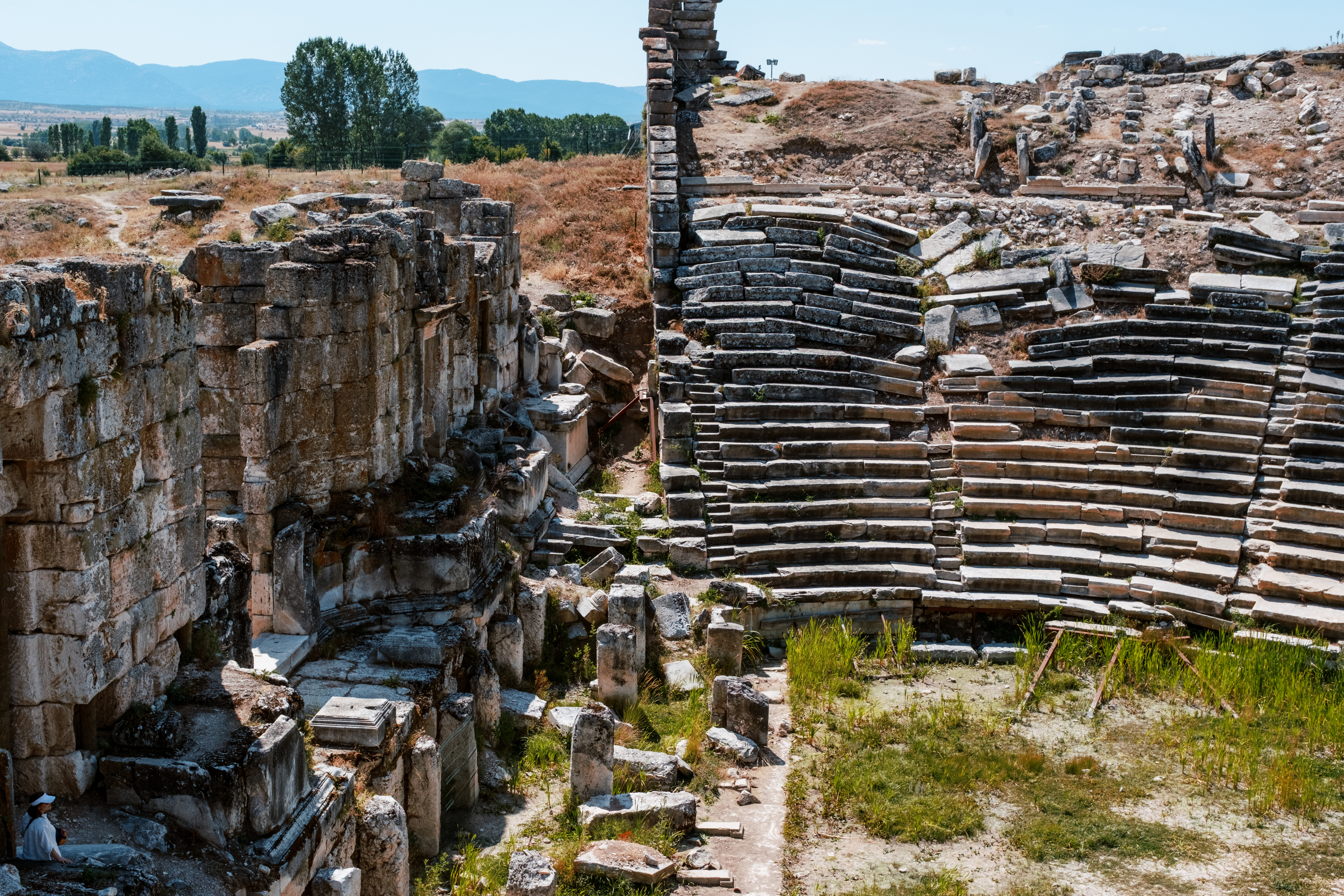
Theater seats at Aizanoi

== See also ==
- Roman Asia
- Roman architecture
- List of World Heritage Sites in Turkey (Tentative list)
