= Penkalas Bridge =

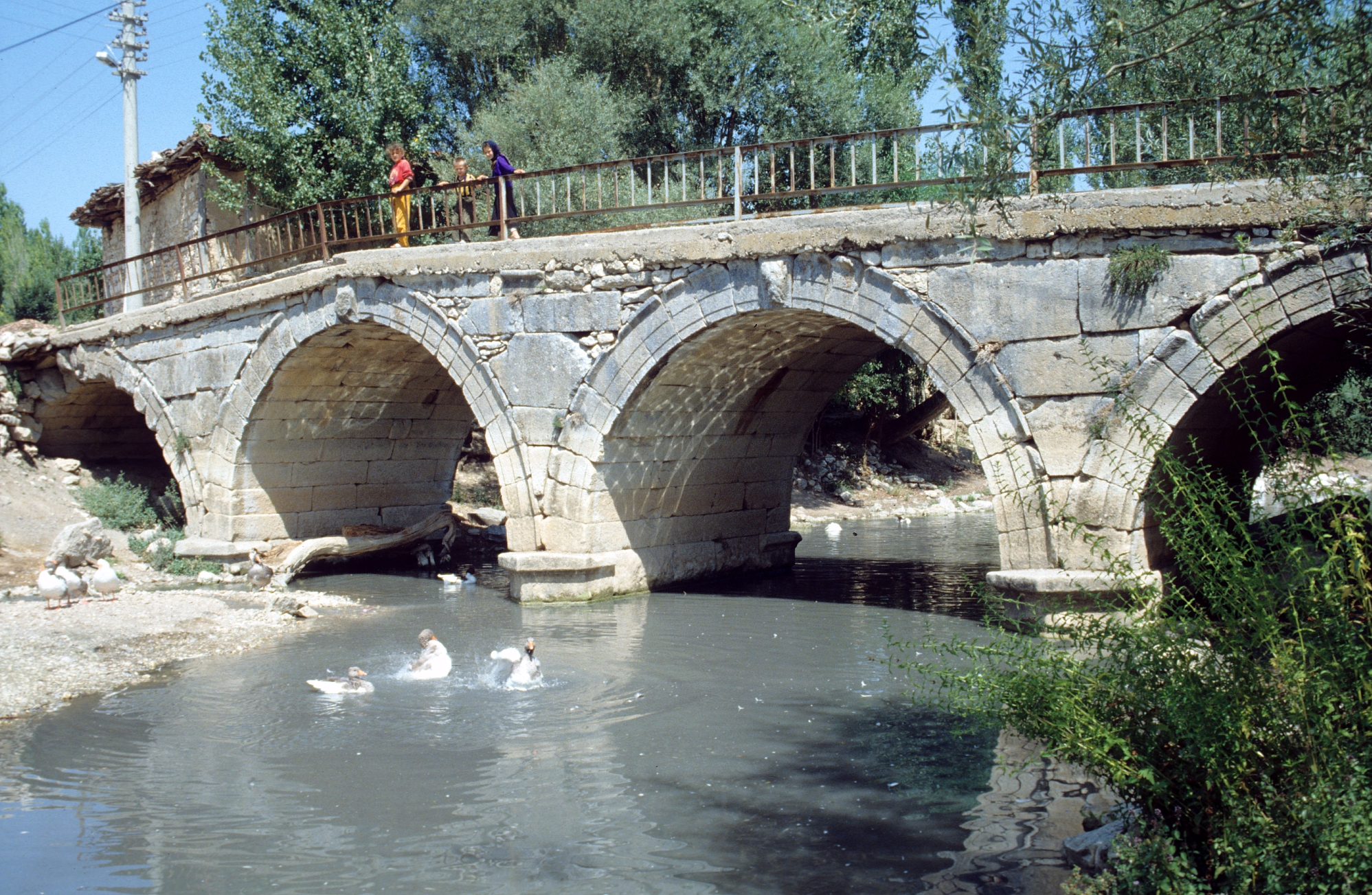
- Penkalas Bridge in 1992
- Coordinates: 39.200833°N 29.612222°E
- Crosses: Penkalas (Kocaçay)
- Locale: Aezani, Turkey

Characteristics
- Design: Arch bridge
- Material: Stone
- No. of spans: 5

History
- Construction end: 2nd century AD

Location
- Interactive map of Penkalas Bridge

The Penkalas Bridge is a Roman bridge over the Penkalas (today Kocaçay), a small tributary of the Rhyndakos (Adırnas Çayı), in Aezani, Asia Minor (Çavdarhisar in present-day Turkey).

The 2nd-century AD structure was once one of four ancient bridges in Aezani and is assumed to have been the most important crossing-point due to its central location in the vicinity of the Zeus temple and the direct access it provided to the Roman road to Cotyaeum (Kütahya). According to reports by European travellers, the ancient parapet remained in use as late as 1829, having been replaced today by an iron railing.

Around 290 m upstream, another well-preserved, almost identical five-arched Roman bridge leads across the Penkalas.

== See also ==
- List of Roman bridges
- Roman architecture
- Roman engineering

== Sources ==
- Galliazzo, Vittorio (1994), I ponti romani. Catalogo generale, vol. 2, Treviso: Edizioni Canova, p. 403 (No. 839), ISBN 88-85066-66-6
- O’Connor, Colin (1993), Roman Bridges, Cambridge University Press, p. 124 (No. E12), ISBN 0-521-39326-4
