= Sillyos =

Town of ancient Ionia

Coordinates: 38°30′05″N 27°03′32″E

Sillyos was a town of ancient Ionia.

Its site is tentatively located near Çiğli, Asiatic Turkey.
