= 1970 Gediz earthquake =

7.2 magnitude earthquake in western Turkey

- Location within Turkey
- UTC time: 1970-03-28 21:02:24
- ISC event: 798506
- USGS-ANSS: ComCat
- Local date: 28 March 1970
- Local time: 23:02:24
- Magnitude: 7.2 M_{w}
- Depth: 17.7 km (11.0 mi)
- Epicenter: 39.2°N 29.5°E
- Areas affected: Turkey
- Max. intensity: MMI IX (Violent)
- Casualties: 1,086 dead, 1,260 injured

The 1970 Gediz earthquake, also known as the 1970 Kütahya-Gediz earthquake (Turkish: 1970 Gediz depremi) struck western Turkey on 28 March at about 23:02 local time with an estimated magnitude of 7.2 on the M_{w} scale.

== Geology ==
The earthquake was active on the "Turgutlu-Sındırgı-Simav-Gediz fault" line in the second-degree earthquake zone. The earthquake occurred due to the vertival movements of a fault line extending in the northwest direction from Akçaalan-Kayaköy and Dereköy to Hisarcık and the fault line extending in the direction of Çomaklar-Çukurören villages. The earthquake area was formed 2.5 million years ago. After the earthquake, a 7 cm (2.8 in) horizontal and 15–20 cm (5.9–7.9 in) vertical-slip fissure with a largest opening of 50 cm (20 in) was detected at the foot of Seyranbaşı Hill near Yunuslar Village. A 10–15 cm (3.9–5.9 in) vertical-slip fissure was observed in Çavdarhisar. Tension crack systems were detected at the junction of Gediz River and Bulacık Creek to the south of Gediz district center and around Çayçinge Village. According to the Richter scale, it was measured as 7.2 in Gediz, 7 in Emet, 6 in Simav and 5 in Kütahya.

== Damage and casualties ==
The earthquake killed 1,086 people, injured 1,260, while 9,473 buildings were destroyed or severely damaged leaving around 26,000 people homeless in Gediz. Many people were burned alive as fires broke out from overturned stoves. The earthquake caused destruction in an area of 13,250 km^{2} (5,120 sq mi), and was felt in 45% of Turkey.

== Aftermath ==
Gediz, a district of Kütahya Province situated 98 km (61 mi) southeast of Kütahya, was a town that experienced repeated natural disasters including earthquakes and floods. It was relocated following a government resolution soon after the destruction caused by the 1970 earthquake to a new location that was 7 km (4.3 mi) away on the road to Uşak with the new name of Yeni Gediz (English: New Gediz). The residents moved in their newly built, earthquake-resistant homes. Neighboring towns and villages were also rebuilt at places with relative minimum earthquake risk.

Other major earthquakes occurred in Gediz in 1866 and 1896, and on 25 June 1944, at 07:20 local time, a magnitude 6.0 earthquake occurred in Gediz, killing 20 people and damaging around 3,500 buildings.

== See also ==
- List of earthquakes in 1970
- List of earthquakes in Turkey
