= Çavdarhisar District =

District of Kütahya Province, Turkey

- District
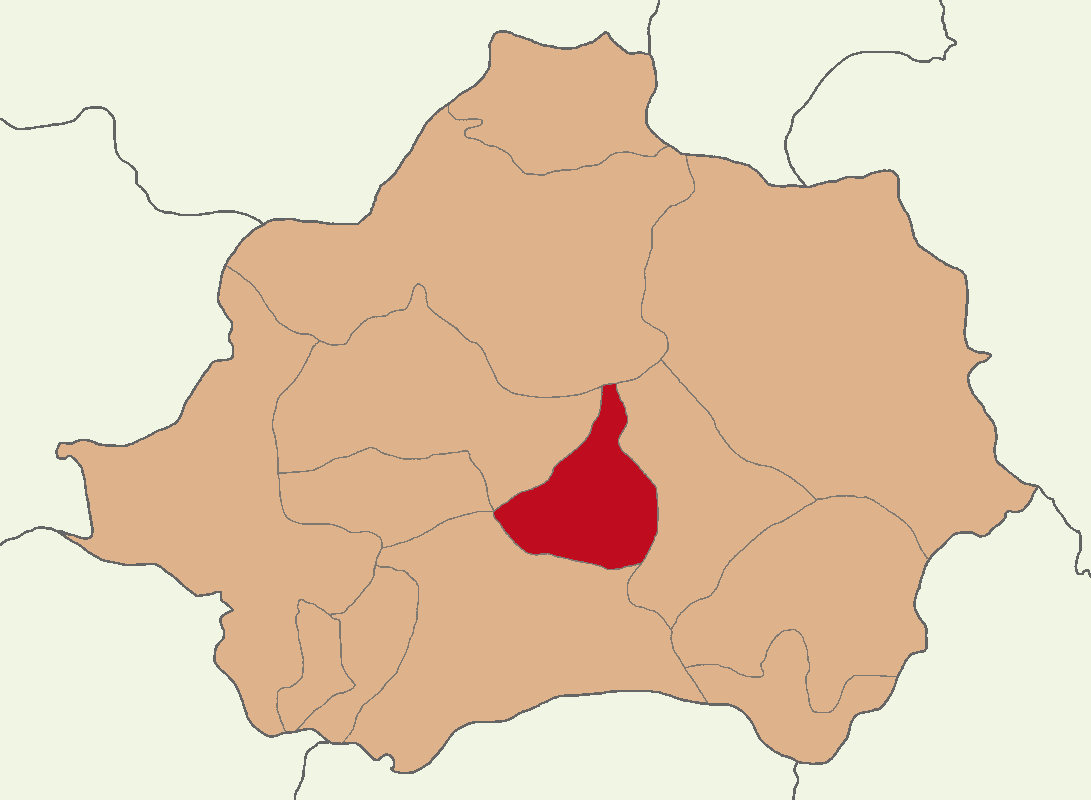
- Map showing Çavdarhisar District in Kütahya Province

- Location in Turkey Çavdarhisar District (Turkey Aegean)
- Coordinates: 39°12′N 29°37′E
- Country: Turkey
- Province: Kütahya
- Seat: Çavdarhisar

Government
  - Kaymakam: Metin Korkmaz
- Area: 429 km^{2} (166 sq mi)
- Population (2022): 5,771
  - Density: 13/km^{2} (35/sq mi)
- Time zone: UTC+3 (TRT)
- Website: www.cavdarhisar.gov.tr

Çavdarhisar District is a district of the Kütahya Province of Turkey. Its seat is the town of Çavdarhisar. Its area is 429 km^{2}, and its population is 5,771 (2022).

== Composition ==
There is one municipality in Çavdarhisar District:

- Çavdarhisar

There are 23 villages in Çavdarhisar District:

- Afşar
- Ağarı
- Akpınar
- Barağı
- Çamköy
- Çatköy
- Demiroluk
- Doğancılar
- Efeler
- Efendiköprüsü
- Gökağaç
- Gökler
- Hacıbekir
- Hacımahmut
- İlçikören
- Kızık
- Pusatlar
- Susuzkaya
- Tepecik
- Yağdığın
- Yenicearmutcuk
- Yeşildere
- Zobu
