= Yenikent, Gediz =

Yenikent
- Municipality
- Location in Turkey Yenikent (Turkey Aegean)
- Coordinates: 38°52′10″N 29°17′18″E
- Country: Turkey
- Province: Kütahya
- District: Gediz
- Population (2022): 2,374
- Time zone: UTC+3 (TRT)

Yenikent is a town (belde) in the Gediz District, Kütahya Province, Turkey. Its population is 2,374 (2022).
