= Gediz Delta =

River delta at the confluence of the Gediz River with the Gulf of İzmir

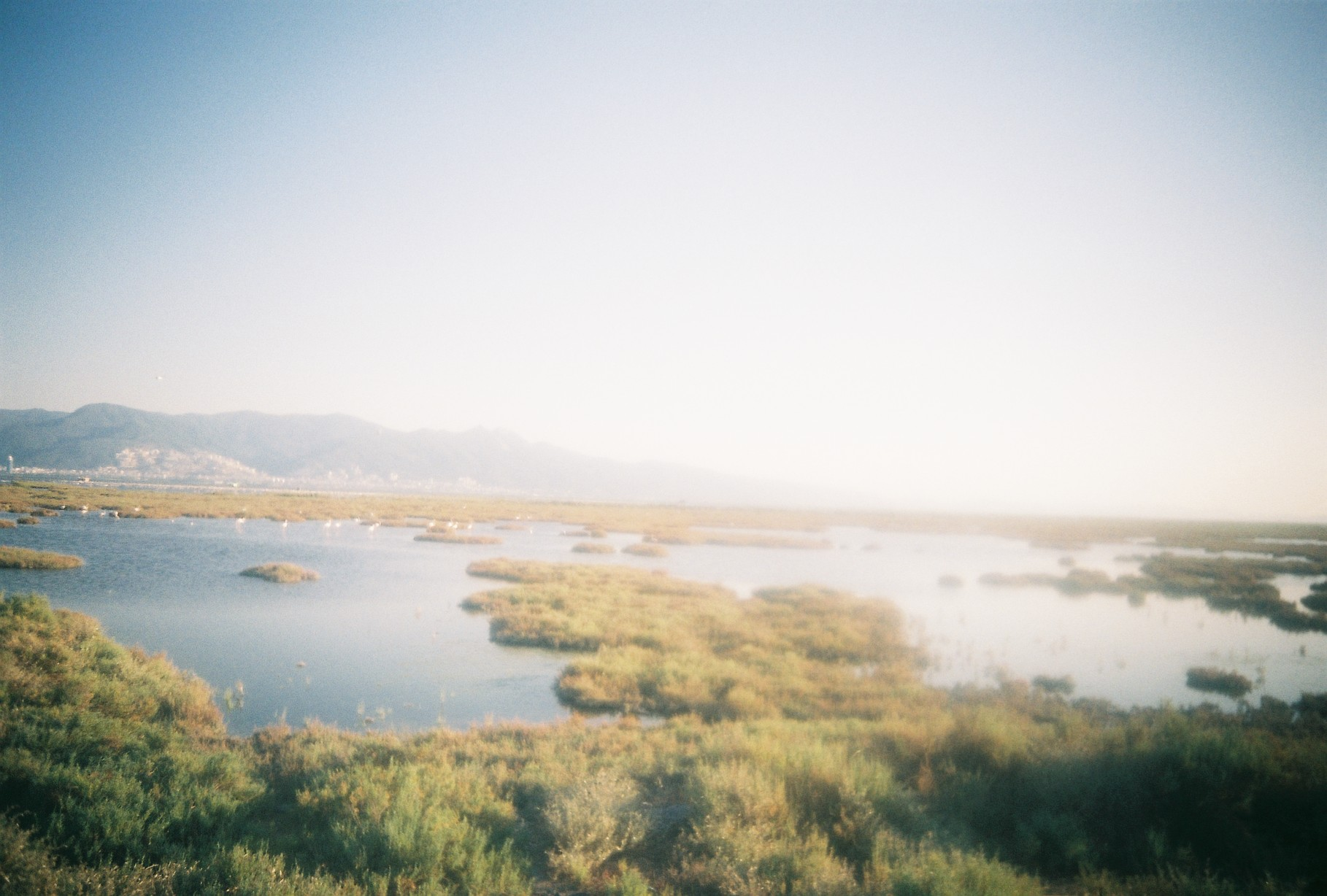
- The Gediz River Delta on a bright afternoon.

- Location within Turkey
- Location: İzmir Province, Turkey
- Nearest city: İzmir
- Coordinates: 38°31′N 26°53′E
- Area: 14,900 ha (58 sq mi)
- Governing body: Ministry of Agriculture and Forestry

Ramsar Wetland
- Official name: Gediz Delta
- Designated: 15 April 1998
- Reference no.: 945

The Gediz Delta is the river delta at the confluence of the Gediz River with the Gulf of İzmir, in İzmir Province in western Turkey. It is a 14,900 ha area of land that occupies coastal parts of Foça, Menemen, and Çiğli districts. It is one of the largest areas of coastal wetlands in Turkey and has a biodiversity of plants and birds. It is a Ramsar site since 1998 and an Important Bird Area since 2000. It is 26 km from İzmir city center.

== Flora and fauna ==
The delta is home to more than 250 bird species and hosts approximately 80,000 birds in winter. It provides shelter for 10% of the world's flamingo population.

== History ==
Remains of the former Ionian town of Leucae are located on the delta.

== Economy ==
Çamaltı Salt Pan, which is located on the delta, provides one third of Turkey's salt production.
