= Çavdarhisar =

- Municipality
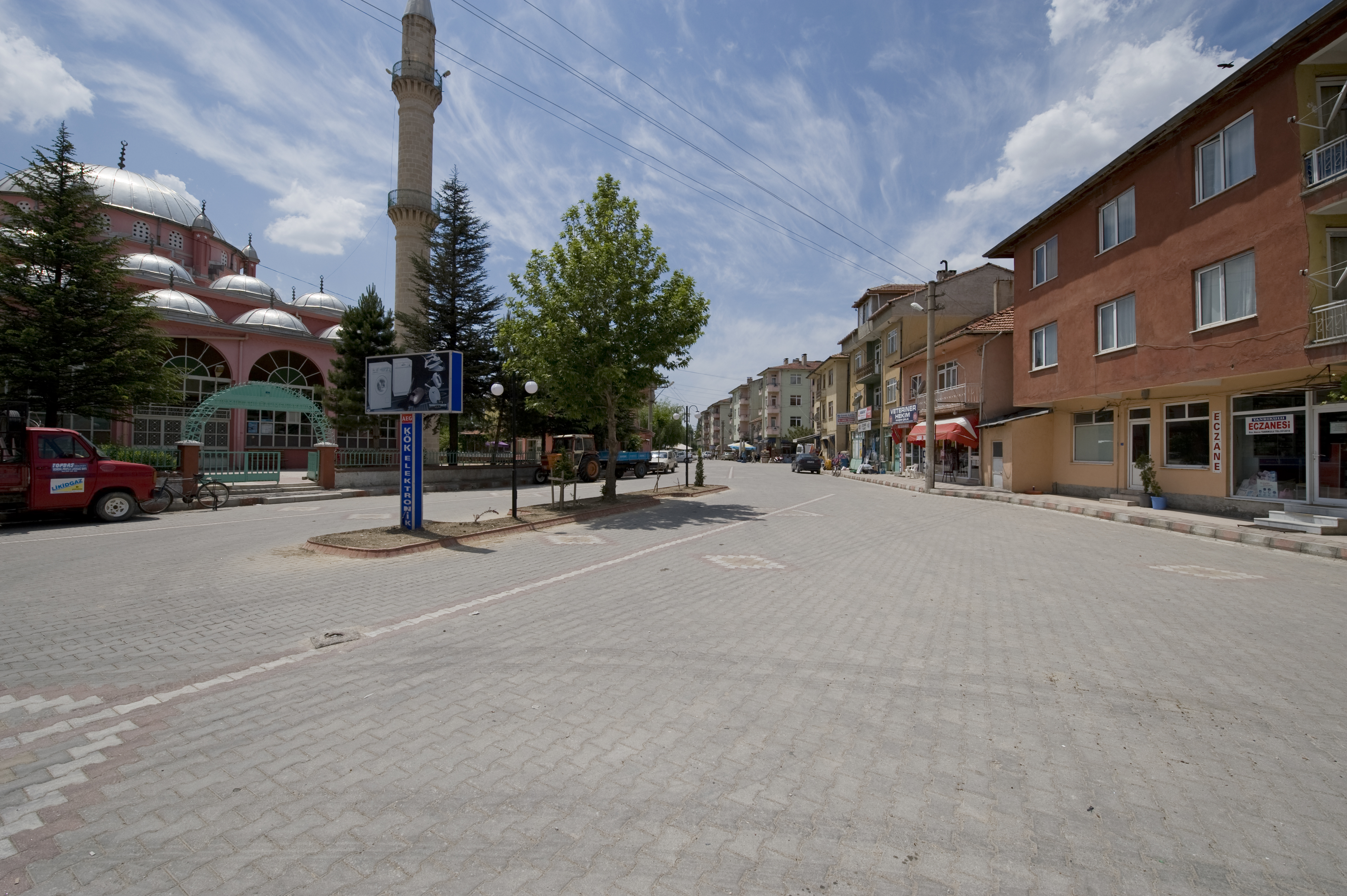
- Street corner in Çavdarhisar

- Location within Turkey Location within Turkey Aegean
- Coordinates: 39°11′52″N 29°36′57″E
- Country: Turkey
- Province: Kütahya
- District: Çavdarhisar

Government
  - Mayor: Halil Ibrahim Topbaş (MHP)
- Elevation: 1,026 m (3,366 ft)
- Population (2022): 2,099
- Time zone: UTC+3 (TRT)
- Area code: 0274
- Website: cavdarhisar.bel.tr

Çavdarhisar is a town in Kütahya Province in the Aegean region of Turkey. It is the seat of Çavdarhisar District. Its population is 2,099 (2022). Its elevation is 1,026 m (3,366 ft). The local Kocaçay stream is still crossed by the Roman Penkalas Bridge.

== Archaeology ==
In January 2021, archaeologists led by Dr. Elif Özer from Pamukkale University announced that they had discovered a cache containing 651 Roman coins dated about 2,100 years ago in a jug buried near a stream in Aizanoi. Researchers revealed a jug firstly in 2019. 439 pieces of coins were denarius (ancient Roman coins minted on silver), and 212 were cistophori, silver coins from Pergamum. Caesar, Brutus, Mark Antony and Augustus Young are engraved on the mostly well-preserved coins. Find is going to display in the Museum of Anatolian Civilizations.

In August 2021, archaeologists from Dumlupinar University announced the discovery of statue of Hygieia. Human sized statue has portrayed with a snake in its arms. The statue was revealed inside the columned gallery throughout the south wing of the agora.

== Places of interest ==
- Aizanoi ancient city of Phrygia
