= Battle of the Gediz =

Part of the Greco-Turkish War (1919-22)

- Part of the Greco-Turkish War (1919–22)
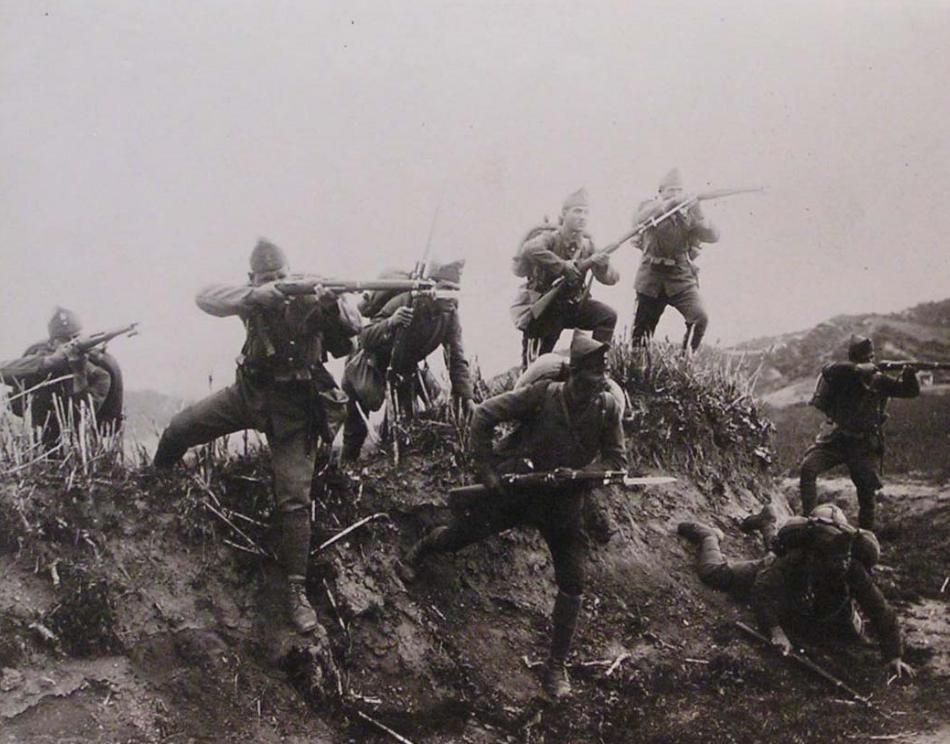
- Greek soldiers charging against Turks in Gediz river
Date	24 October – 12 November 1920
Location	Gediz River, Gediz
Result	Greek victory

Belligerents
(Kingdom of Greece) Greece	(Ottoman Empire) Ankara Government: (Ottoman Empire) Kuva-yi Milliye

Commanders and leaders
Konstantinos Manetas	Ali Fuat Pasha; Çerkes Ethem

Units involved
13th Infantry Division	61st Division; 11th Division; Kuva-yi Milliye

Strength
c. 9,000 men	c. 9,500 men; 7,000 regulars; 2,500 irregulars

Casualties and losses
42 killed 123 wounded	181 killed 135 wounded

The Battle of the Gediz was fought between the Turkish Kuva-yi Milliye forces and the Greek forces near the Gediz River in the city of Gediz. The Turkish forces attacked Gediz in order isolate and destroy the Greek 13th Division. The battle also showed that the irregular forces lacked discipline and experience; they had little chance in open field battles against the Greeks. The experiences gained in this battle led the Turkish provisional Government of the Grand National Assembly to the conclusion that it would be necessary hence forward to establish and fight with a regular army against the Greek army instead of irregular forces.

The Turkish offensive began on 24 October 1920, with Ali Fuat Pasha's 11th and 61st Infantry Divisions and Çerkes Ethem's irregular cavalry attacking the Greek 13th Infantry Division. Despite two assaults, the Turkish forces failed to dislodge the Greeks and were ordered to withdraw. The Greek division also withdrew during the night, establishing new defensive positions at Hamidiyehanı. A renewed Turkish attack on 27 October was also unsuccessful.

On 31 October, the Greek 13th Infantry Division launched a counterattack, defeating Turkish forces near Hamidiye and recapturing Gediz without further resistance. The Greek troops subsequently evacuated the town under orders from the Greek High Command and returned to their previous positions, while the Turkish forces also withdrew to their former lines.

The failure of the Turkish offensive resulted in disagreements between the commanders, with Mustafa Kemal explicitly admitting the defeat and calling for the creation of a regular army. The latter dispute led to Ethem's later surrender to Greece and his subsequent cooperation with them.
