= Gökler, Gediz =

Gökler
- Municipality
- Location in Turkey Gökler (Turkey Aegean)
- Coordinates: 39°00′45″N 29°32′41″E
- Country: Turkey
- Province: Kütahya
- District: Gediz
- Population (2022): 2,066
- Time zone: UTC+3 (TRT)

Gökler is a town (belde) in the Gediz District, Kütahya Province, Turkey. Its population is 2,066 (2022).
