= Çiğli =

- District and municipality
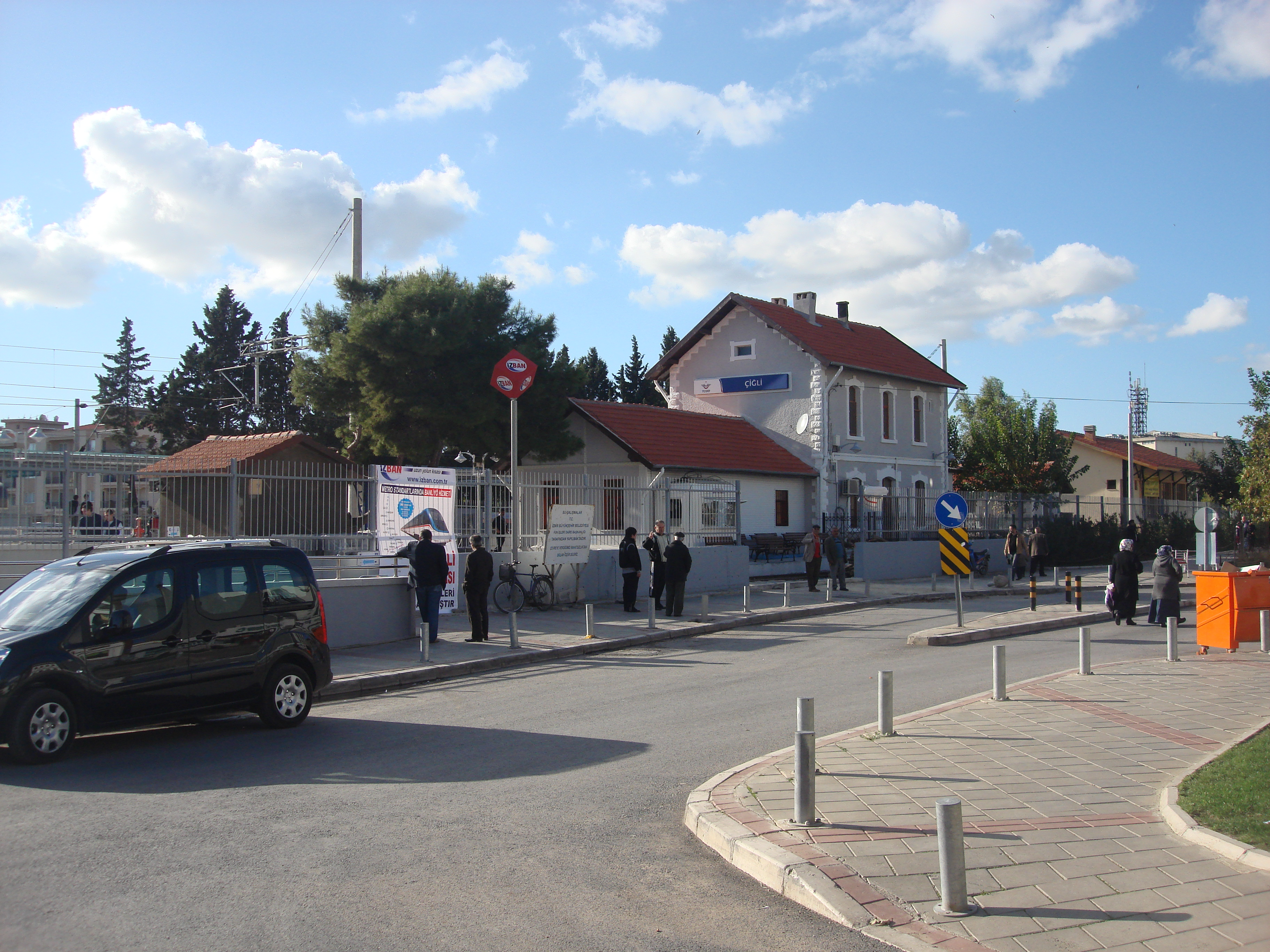
- Çiğli Train Station

- Map showing Çiğli District in İzmir Province

- Location within Turkey Location within İzmir
- Coordinates: 38°29′N 27°3′E
- Country: Turkey
- Province: İzmir

Government
  - Mayor: Onur Emrah Yıldız (CHP)
- Area: 139 km^{2} (54 sq mi)
- Population (2022): 214,065
  - Density: 1,540/km^{2} (3,990/sq mi)
- Time zone: UTC+3 (TRT)
- Area code: 0232
- Website: www.cigli.bel.tr

Çiğli Turkish: [ˈtʃiːli] is a municipality and district of İzmir Province, Turkey. Its area is 139 km^{2}, and its population is 214,065 (2022). It covers the northwestern part of the agglomeration of İzmir, around the mouth of the river Gediz, across the Gulf of İzmir from the main city. The Gediz delta is an Important Bird Area but is under threat from urbanization. IAOIZ, the İzmir Atatürk Organized Industrial Zone, is a significant economic hub and there is a major air force base.

== History ==
Çiğ means dew in Turkish, a reference to the delta marshes of the River Gediz which used to cover the entire area. It is a relatively recent settlement created largely by migration from other parts of Turkey, starting with Turkish refugees of the Russo-Turkish War (1877-1878). Turks from the surrounding region took refuge in the marshes during the Greco-Turkish War (1919-1922), and were joined by ethnic Turks from the Greek province of Western Thrace after the war. The population was further increased by survivors of two earthquakes in eastern Anatolia in 1946 and 1966. Economic migration from eastern Anatolia has continued at a steady pace since then and even the mayor was born in Diyarbakır.

== Geography ==
Çiğli was built on the delta marshes where the river Gediz flows into the Gulf of İzmir. It lies between Karşıyaka, another metropolitan district, to the south and the west, and İzmir's external dependent district of Menemen to the north. The western boundary is formed by the current delta of the River Gediz where the land is under the constant pressure of further urbanization. The future of the delta is among priority issues in Turkey's agenda of the protection of the environment. Many citizens would like to see full protection for the delta assured to preserve its unique fauna and flora along bird migration routes. The delta is an IBA (Important Bird Area) registered with BirdLife International.

== Government ==
Çiğli gained village status after the fall of the Ottoman Empire and became a municipality in 1956. It was attached to İzmir's metropolitan area in 1981, first as a dependency of the district of Karşıyaka, and in 1992 it became a distinct entity with its own administrative structures.

=== Neighbourhoods ===
There are 26 neighbourhoods in Çiğli District:

- Ahmet Efendi
- Ataşehir
- Atatürk
- Aydınlıkevler
- Balatcık
- Çağdaş
- Cumhuriyet
- Egekent
- Esentepe
- Evka 2
- Evka 5
- Evka 6
- Güzeltepe
- Harmandalı Gazi Mustafa Kemal Atatürk
- İnönü
- İzkent
- Kaklıç
- Köyiçi
- Küçükçiğli
- Maltepe
- Prf. Dr.Ahmet Taner Kışlalı
- Sasalımerkez
- Şirintepe
- Uğur Mumcu
- Yakakent
- Yenimahalle

== Economy ==
The İzmir Atatürk Organized Industrial Zone (IAOIZ) has 485 factories employing 30,000 people.

== Culture and community ==
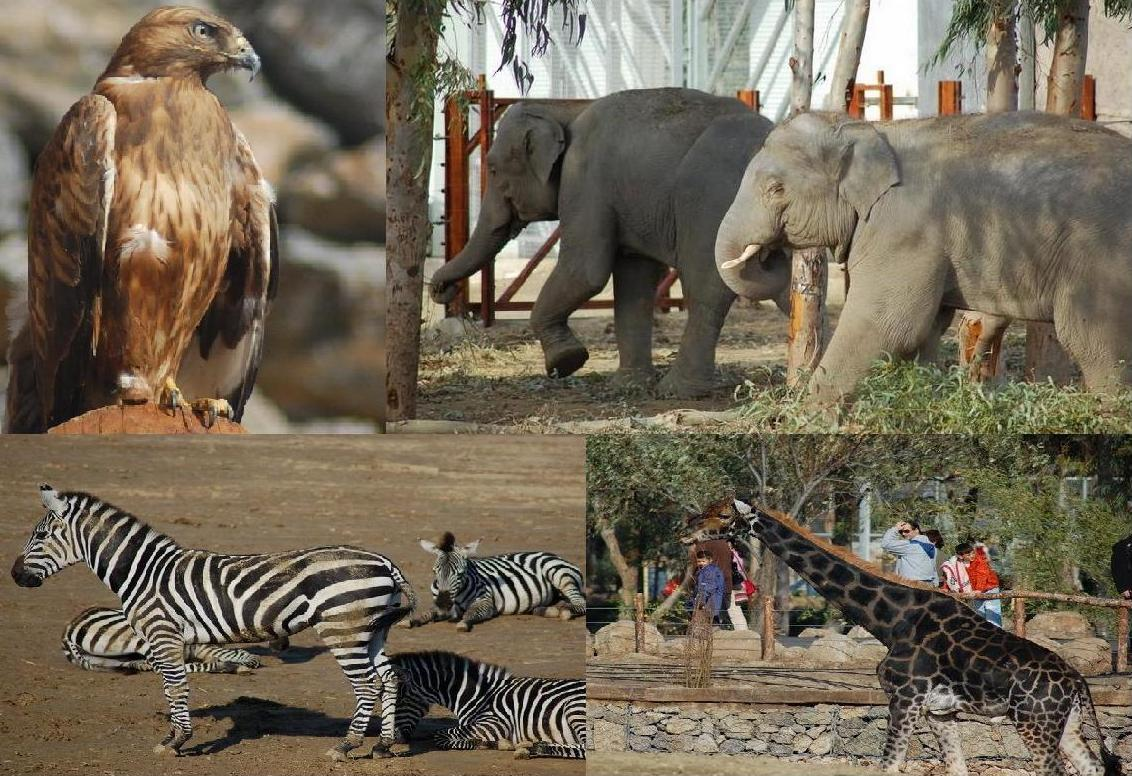
İzmir Wildlife Park

Ekol Sanat Galerisi is a small privately owned art gallery with regular exhibitions.

== Landmarks ==
The İzmir Bird Paradise (Kuş Cenneti) has recorded 205 species of birds, including 63 species that are resident year-round, 54 species of summer migratory birds, 43 species of winter migratory birds, and 30 transient species. 56 species of birds have bred in the park. The sanctuary, which covers 80 square kilometres, was registered as "the protected area for water birds and for their breeding" by the Turkish Ministry of Forestry in 1982. İzmir Wildlife Park (İzmir Doğal Yaşam Parkı) is a large open-air zoo established in 2008.

== Transport ==
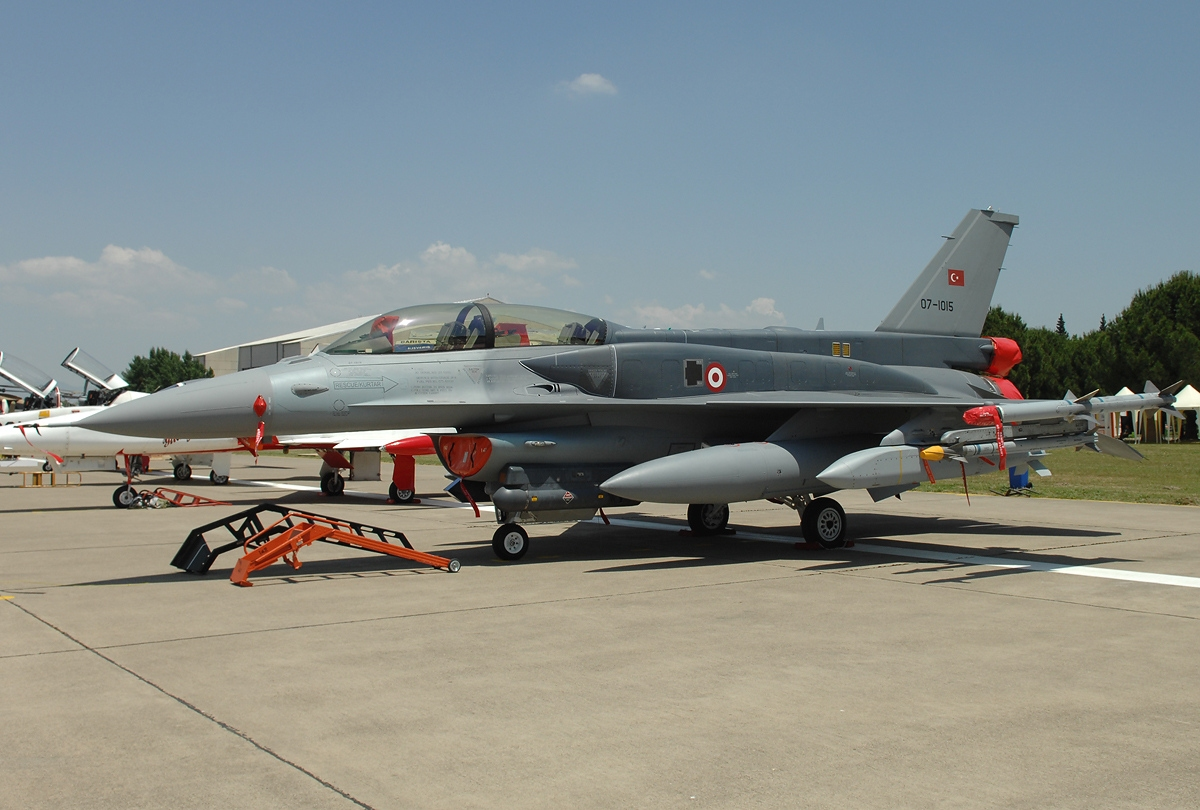
F-16D at Çiğli Air Base

Çiğli Air Base is now used only by the military but served as İzmir's airport until the new Adnan Menderes Airport opened. Çiğli railway station is served by Turkish State Railways and by the new commuter rail line İZBAN. Also Çiğli Tram opened on 27 January 2024.

== Education ==
İzmir Kâtip Çelebi University was established in 2010. There was a medical campus of Gediz University, which closed during the 2016 Turkish purges.

== Religious sites ==
There are 20 mosques including the Küçük Çiğli Cami, Egekent Cami, Esentepe Cami and İzzet Erişen Cami.

== Sport ==
Karşıyaka S.K. run teams in several sports at the nearby Karşıyaka Arena.
