= Çiğli Air Base =

Military airbase in Izmir, Turkey

Çiğli Air Base Çiğli Hava Üssü
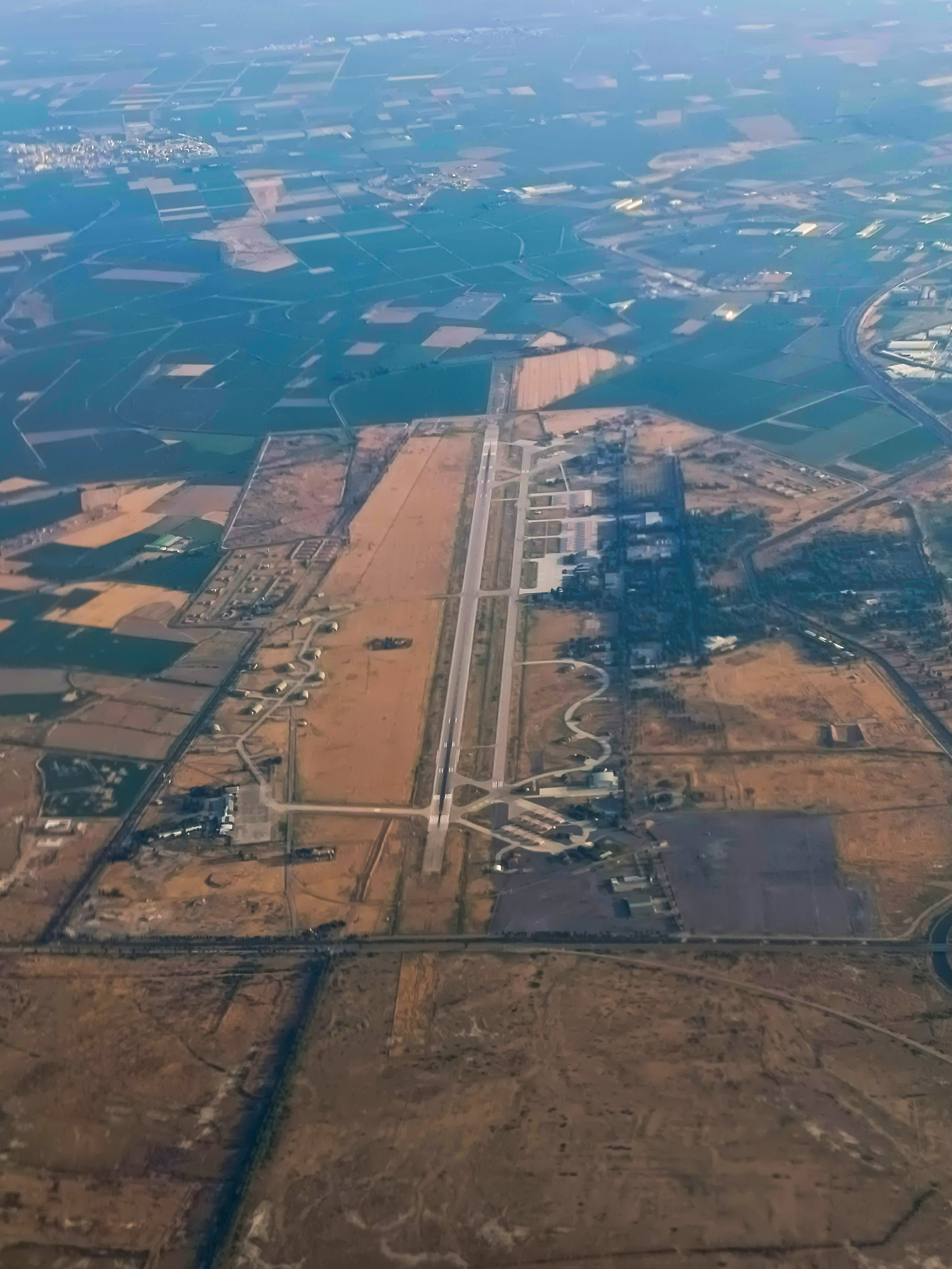
- Çiğli Air Base, 2024
- IATA: IGL; ICAO: LTBL

Summary
- Airport type: Military
- Owner: Turkish Air Force
- Location: Çiğli, İzmir, Turkey
- Elevation AMSL: 16 ft (4.9 m)
- Coordinates: 38°30′46″N 027°00′36″E

Map
- Location of airport in Turkey LTBL (NATO)

Runways
| Direction | Length | | Surface |
| Direction | m | ft | Surface |
|---|---|---|---|
| 17/35 | 2,994 | 9,821 | Asphalt |
- Source: DAFIF

Çiğli Air Base (Turkish: Çiğli Hava Üssü) (IATA: IGL, ICAO: LTBL) is a military airport near Çiğli, a metropolitan district of the city of İzmir in İzmir Province, Turkey.

It served as İzmir's airport until the opening of the Adnan Menderes Airport, situated south of the metropolitan area.

== Facilities ==
The airport resides at an elevation of 16 feet (5 m) above mean sea level. It has one runway designated 17/35 with an asphalt surface measuring 2,993 by 45 metres (9,820 ft × 148 ft).
