= Gediz District =

District of Kütahya Province, Turkey

- District
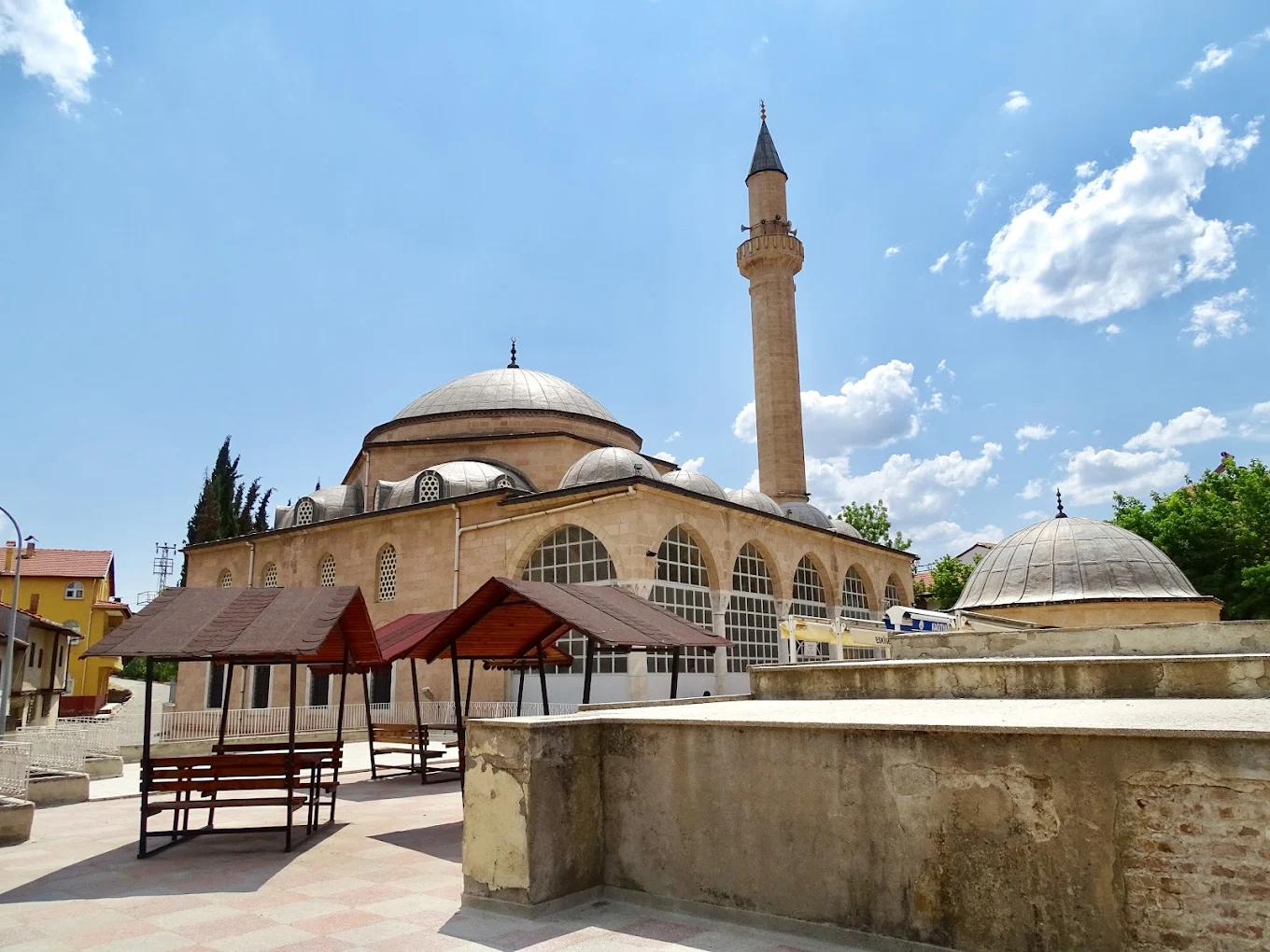
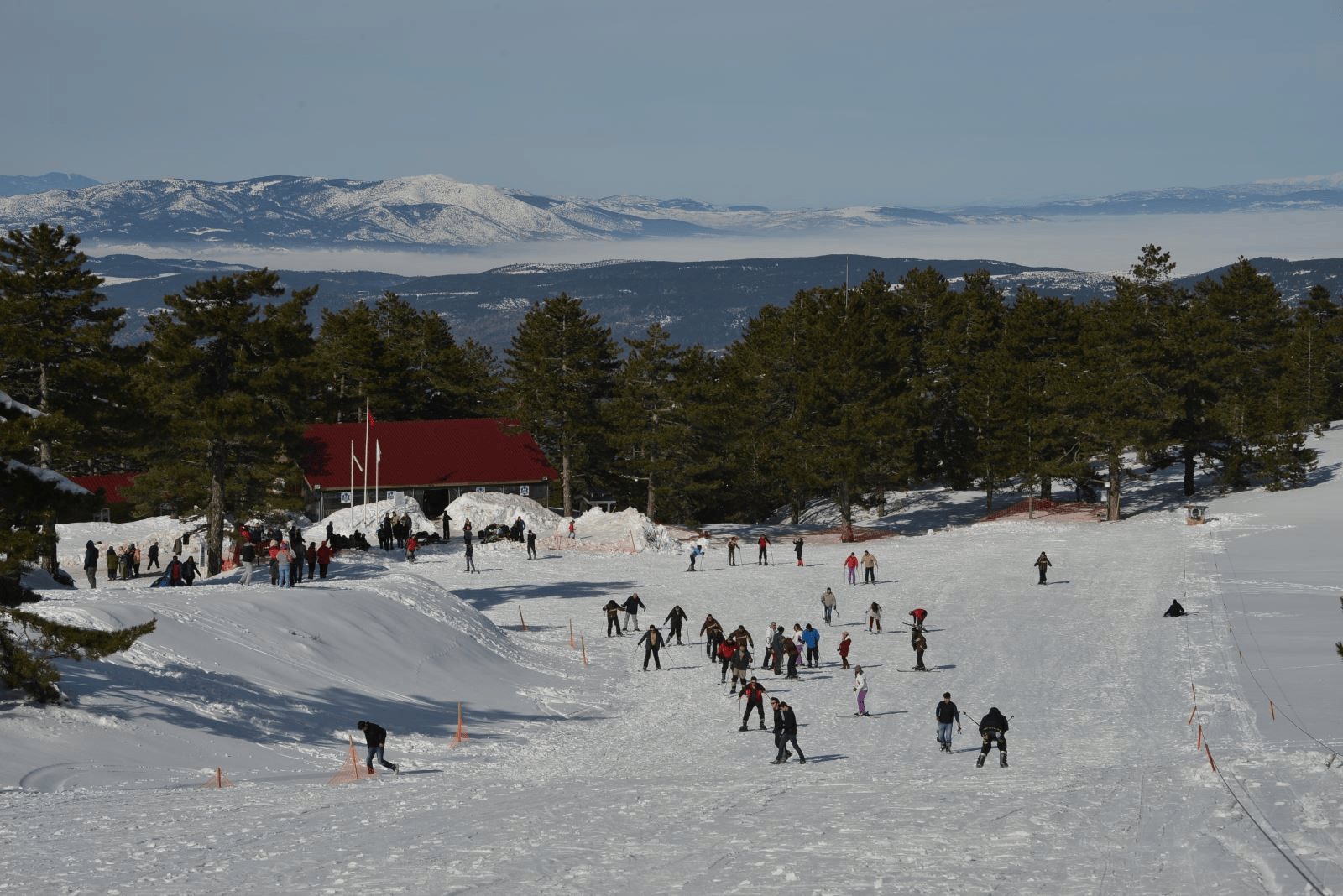
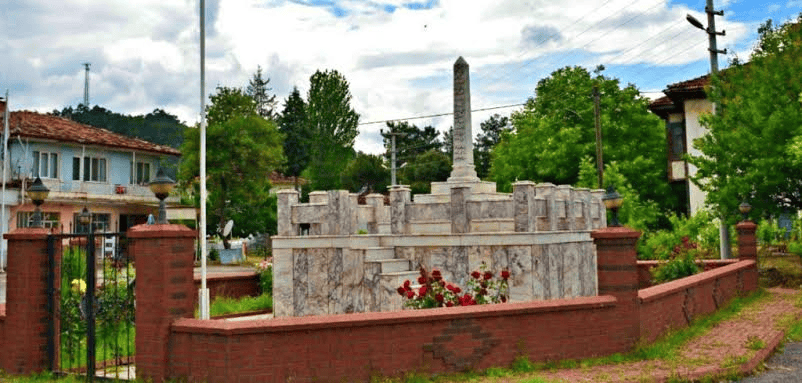
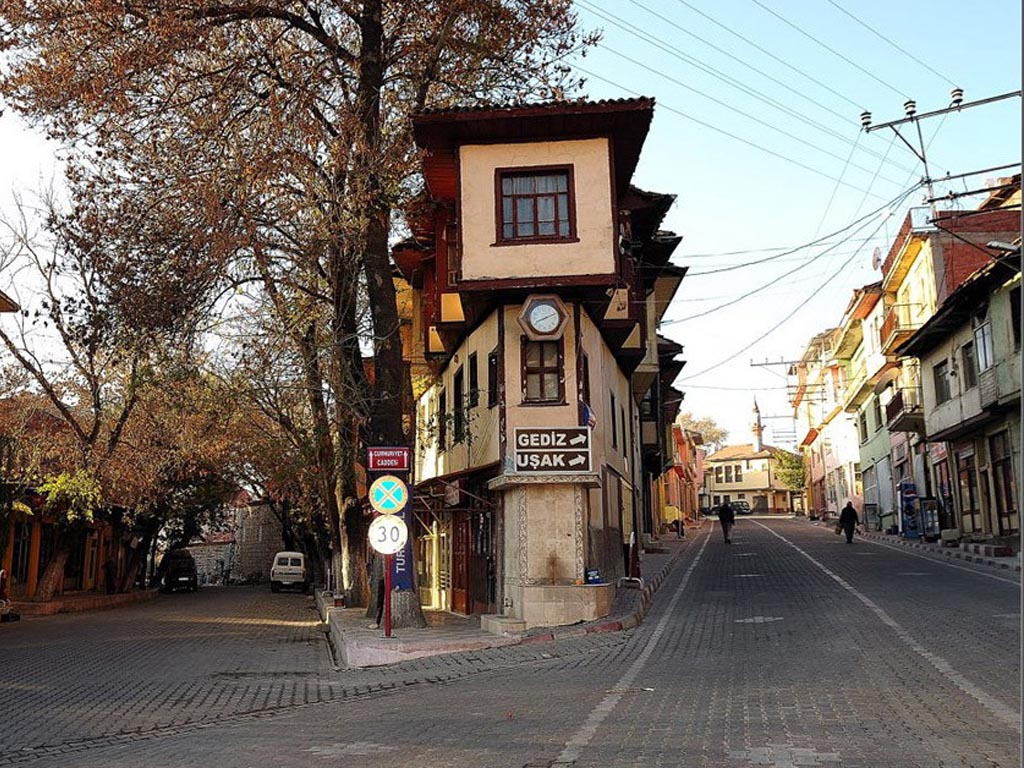
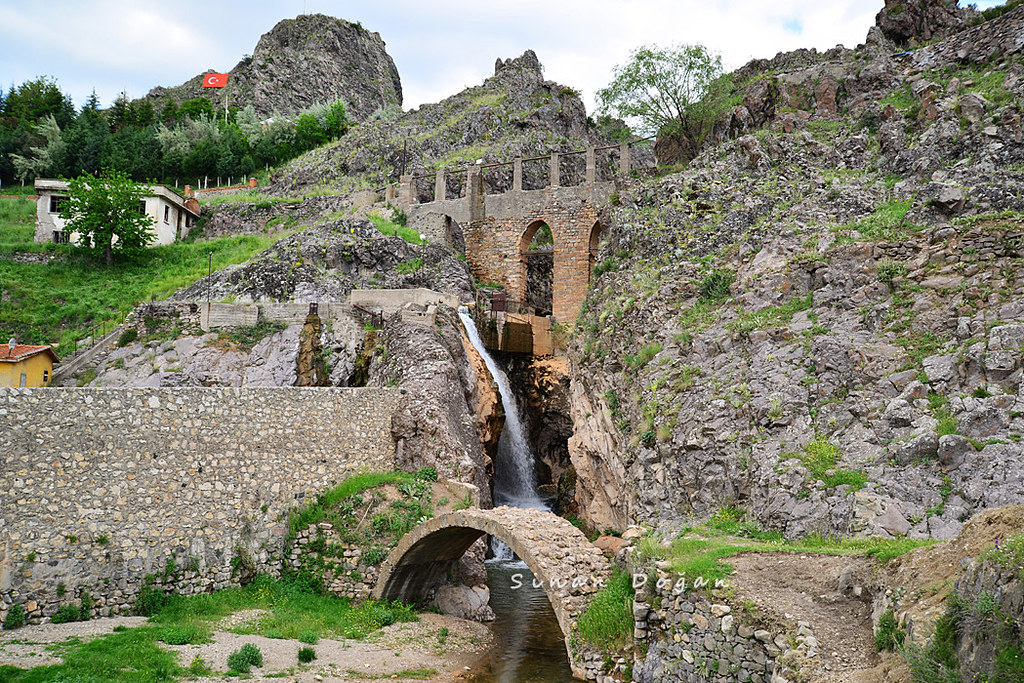
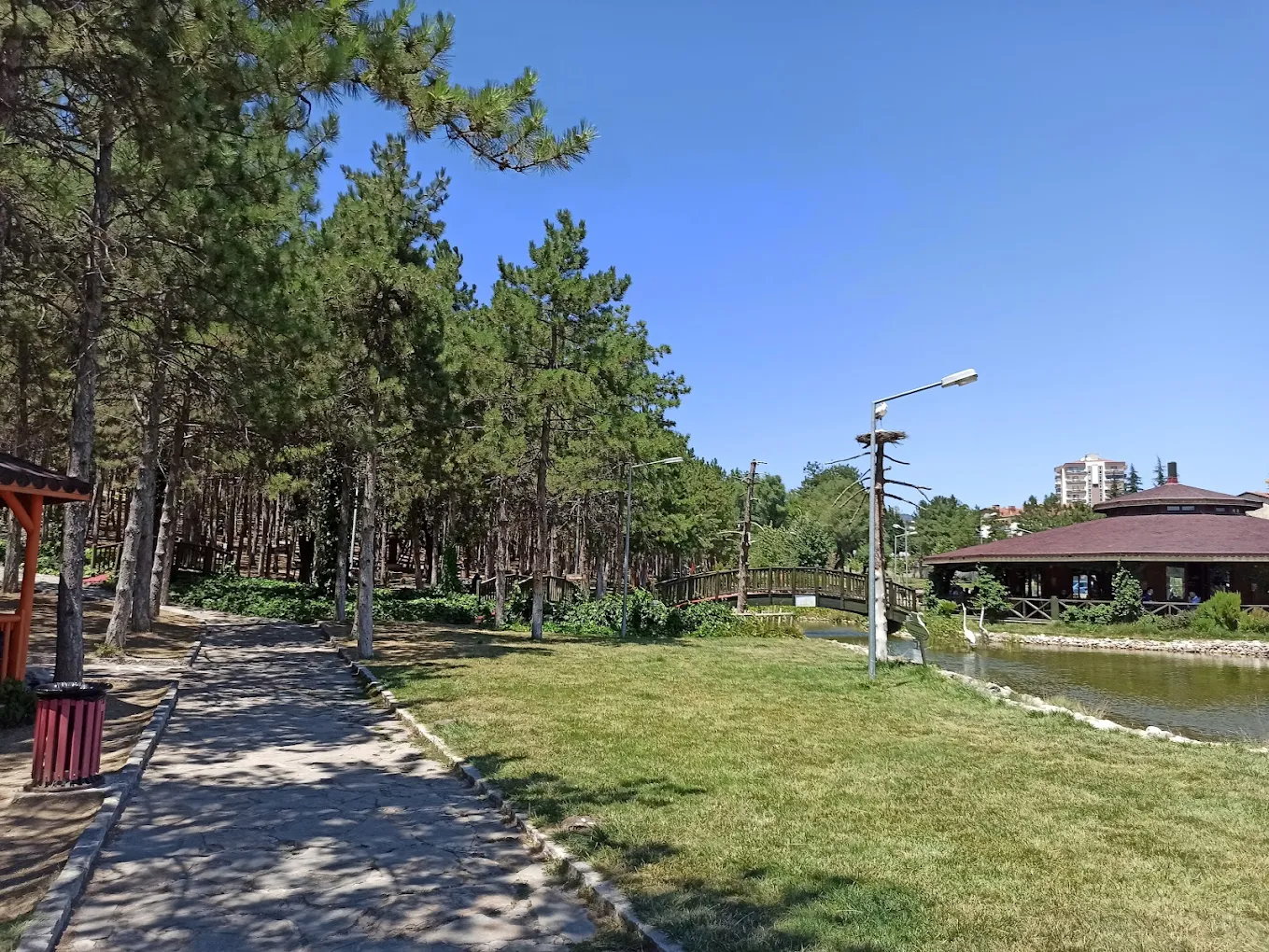
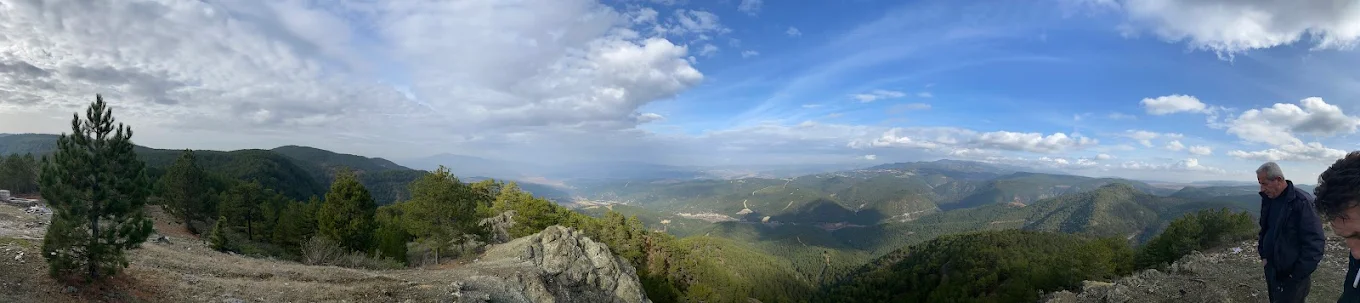
- Top to bottom, left to right: Gazanfer Ağa Mosque (Gediz Grand Mosque); Murat Mountain thermal tourism and ski resort; Gediz Monument; traditional Turkish houses and mansions in Old Gediz; historic aqueduct and stone bridge; Adnan Menderes Life Park and nature area; Gediz Forest

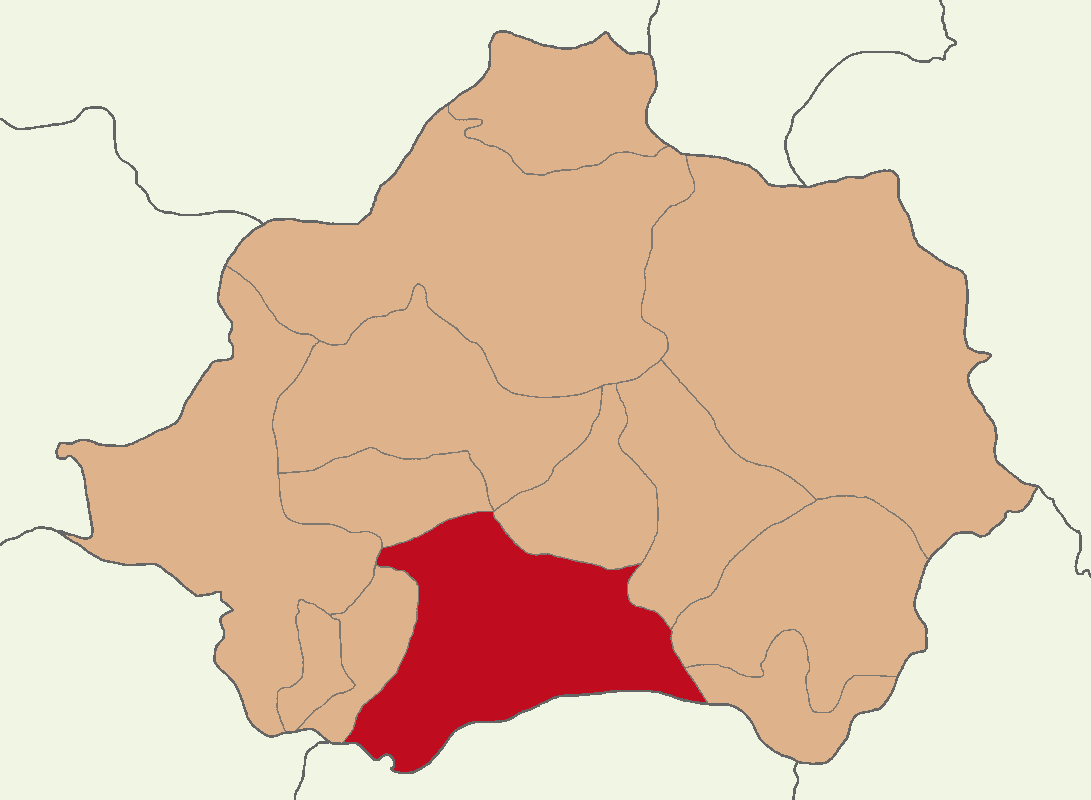
- Map showing Gediz District in Kütahya Province

- Location within Turkey Location within Turkey Aegean
- Coordinates: 39°00′N 29°23′E
- Country: Turkey
- Province: Kütahya
- Seat: Gediz

Government
  - Kaymakam: Hakan Alkan
- Area: 1,193 km^{2} (461 sq mi)
- Population (2022): 50,151
  - Density: 42.04/km^{2} (108.9/sq mi)
- Time zone: UTC+3 (TRT)
- Website: www.gediz.gov.tr

Gediz District is a district of the Kütahya Province of Turkey. Its seat is the town of Gediz. Its area is 1,193 km^{2}, and its population is 50,151 (2022).

== Composition ==
There are four municipalities in Gediz District:

- Eskigediz
- Gediz
- Gökler
- Yenikent

There are 57 villages in Gediz District:

- Abide
- Akkaya
- Aksaklar
- Aliağa
- Alikahya
- Altınkent
- Arıca
- Aşıkpaşa
- Cebrail
- Çeltikçi
- Çomaklar
- Çukurören
- Dedeköy
- Değirmenköy
- Dereköy
- Dörtdeğirmen
- Ece
- Erdoğmuş
- Fırdan
- Göynük
- Göynükören
- Gümele
- Gümüşlü
- Gürlek
- Güzüngülü
- Ilıcasu
- Işıklar
- Karaağaç
- Karabacaklar
- Kayacık
- Kayaköy
- Kıran
- Köpenez
- Kurtçam
- Pınarbaşı
- Polat
- Samralar
- Sandıklı
- Saruhanlar
- Saz
- Sazak
- Soğuksu
- Sumaklı
- Tepepınar
- Uğurluca
- Üzümlü
- Vakıf
- Yağmurlar
- Yaylaköy
- Yeğinler
- Yelki
- Yenigüney
- Yeşilçay
- Yeşilova
- Yukarısusuz
- Yumrutaş
- Yunuslar
