= Gediz, Kütahya =

Gediz
- Municipality
- Location in Turkey Gediz (Turkey Aegean)
- Coordinates: 38°59′38″N 29°23′29″E
- Country: Turkey
- Province: Kütahya
- District: Gediz

Government
  - Mayor: Necdet Akel (MHP)
- Elevation: 764 m (2,507 ft)
- Population (2022): 26,662
- Time zone: UTC+3 (TRT)
- Area code: 0274
- Website: www.gediz.bel.tr

Gediz is a town in Kütahya Province in the Aegean region of Turkey. It is the seat of Gediz District. Its population is 26,662 (2022). The town was founded in 1970 after the old town, now called Eskigediz, was destroyed in an earthquake. The old town dates back to ancient times and was historically known as Kadoi in Greek and Gedüs in older Turkish.

== Geography ==
The elevation of Gediz is 764 m (2,507 ft). The area was described, in 1920, as having expansive oak forests.

=== Climate ===
Gediz has a hot-summer Mediterranean climate (Köppen: Csa), with hot, dry summers, and chilly winters with some snow.

Climate data for Gediz (1991–2020)
Month	Jan	Feb	Mar	Apr	May	Jun	Jul	Aug	Sep	Oct	Nov	Dec	Year
Mean daily maximum °C (°F)	8.5 (47.3)	10.4 (50.7)	14.3 (57.7)	19.0 (66.2)	24.5 (76.1)	29.3 (84.7)	33.4 (92.1)	33.6 (92.5)	28.9 (84.0)	22.6 (72.7)	15.8 (60.4)	10.0 (50.0)	20.9 (69.6)
Daily mean °C (°F)	2.4 (36.3)	3.8 (38.8)	7.0 (44.6)	11.3 (52.3)	16.2 (61.2)	20.9 (69.6)	24.7 (76.5)	24.7 (76.5)	19.7 (67.5)	13.9 (57.0)	7.9 (46.2)	4.0 (39.2)	13.1 (55.6)
Mean daily minimum °C (°F)	−2.0 (28.4)	−1.2 (29.8)	0.8 (33.4)	4.2 (39.6)	8.3 (46.9)	12.4 (54.3)	16.1 (61.0)	16.3 (61.3)	11.3 (52.3)	7.0 (44.6)	2.0 (35.6)	−0.3 (31.5)	6.3 (43.3)
Average precipitation mm (inches)	71.65 (2.82)	63.1 (2.48)	62.12 (2.45)	55.5 (2.19)	50.05 (1.97)	27.48 (1.08)	11.44 (0.45)	15.83 (0.62)	19.46 (0.77)	47.5 (1.87)	57.01 (2.24)	70.55 (2.78)	551.69 (21.72)
Average precipitation days (≥ 1.0 mm)	8.4	7.5	7.9	7.4	7.0	4.8	2.1	2.5	2.9	5.3	5.9	8.6	70.3
Average relative humidity (%)	76.3	72.7	68.4	65.8	64.2	59.1	51.4	52.5	57.3	66.2	71.4	77.9	65.3
Source: NOAA

== History ==
Until 1970, Gediz was located at present-day Eskigediz, 7 km to the north on the upper reaches of the Gediz Çayı stream. After the old town was destroyed in the 1970 Gediz earthquake, the town was rebuilt at its present location on the plain. The site of the present town was previously known as Karılar Pazarı.

Gediz's origins are in the ancient and medieval settlement of Kadoi (Ancient Greek: Κάδοι), which was located at present-day Eskigediz. Kadoi's earliest known mention was by Polybios in the 2nd century BCE. In Roman times, the town was located in Phrygia Epiktetos, near the border of Phrygia, Mysia, and Lydia. (The sources for this period are Strabo, Stephanus of Byzantium, and Ptolemy.) The 6th-century Synekdemos of Hierokles later mentions Kadoi as part of Phrygia Pakatiane. Kadoi was also a Christian diocese attested consistently from the 7th through 12th centuries in the Notitiae. Until around the 9th century, it was listed as subordinate to Laodikeia, and after that as under Hierapolis until the 12th century.

Gediz was administered as a sanjak under the Seljuk dynasty as well as the succeeding Germiyan beylik. The oldest mosque in what is now Eskigediz, the Umurbey mosque (also called the Serdar mosque), dates from the Seljuk period.

Gediz appears to have come under Ottoman control by 1414. The source for this is a stone inscription from 1414, commemorating the endowment of a külliye complex in Kütahya by the last Germiyan bey, Yakub II. The inscription includes a reference to Yakub acquiring the village of Ilıcasu, subordinate to Gediz, for endowing the külliye. The inscription then mentions that the reigning Ottoman sultan, Mehmed I, signed off on these transactions, which, according to Mustafa Çetin Varlık, indicates that the places mentioned were under Ottoman administration by then. This inscription mentions Gediz as Gedüs, which is an older Turkish spelling of the name.

Two mosques in present-day Eskigediz were built under Ottoman auspices in the 1500s. The first was the Kurşunlu Cami, built in 1540 by one Mustafa bin Hamza. It was the first domed mosque in Gediz. The second was the Ulu Cami, built in 1589/90 (998 AH) on a commission from Gazanfer Ağa, who was Kapı Ağa under the Ottoman sultan Murad III. Several other foundations in Gediz by Gazanfer Ağa, who was a native of the town, are known, including a hamam, a han, and a madrasa. The Ulu Cami was almost completely destroyed by an earthquake in 1970 and rebuilt in 1990.

Also in the 1500s, the Tapu Defter #438, from the reign of Süleyman the Magnificent, listed Gediz as a nahiye in the Sanjak of Kütahya. It was later reclassified as a kaza in the late 1800s.

Evliya Çelebi visited Gediz in the 1600s and left an account of the town (which he also wrote as Gedüs) in his Seyahatnâme. He attributed the town's name to a king of Rum named Gedüs. He wrote that the town was a zeamet with 13 neighborhoods and about 2,000 houses, which were covered with earthen roofs. It had 20 mosques; he specifically referred to the Hacı Mustafa mosque, which he called the old mosque, and the Gazanfer Ağa mosque in the town bazar. The castle, which he wrote was locally called "Canbaz Kale", had recently been destroyed – he mentioned that in 1676, during the Celali revolts, one Kuyucu Murad Paşa had ordered its destruction to prevent the rebels from being able to use it. Evliya also wrote that supposedly, once every 30 years, "a famous group of acrobats" would come to Gediz and climb to the top of the castle rock with ropes.

At the end of the Ottoman period, Ali Cevad wrote that Gediz's importance had partly come from its trade connection with İzmir. He also noted that the town's houses were covered with black clay soil, which he said gave the town a "depressing" appearance.

From 1867 until 1922, Gediz was part of Hüdavendigâr vilayet.

== See also ==
- 1970 Gediz earthquake
- Battle of the Gediz
