= Kütahya Dumlupınar University =

Public university in Kütahya, Turkey

- Kütahya Dumlupınar Üniversitesi
- Type: Public university
- Established: 11 July 1992
- Rector: Kâzım Uysal
- Undergraduates: 49,152
- Postgraduates: 4,346
- Location: Kütahya, Turkey; 39.478°N 29.897°E
- Member of: EUA
- Colors: Red, Blue and White
- Website: dpu.edu.tr

University rankings

Regional – Overall
- QS Emerging Europe and Central Asia: 351-400 (2022)

Kütahya Dumlupınar University is a public university in Kütahya, Turkey. The university began to operate as a new institution under the name of Kütahya Dumlupınar University on 3 July 1992, with the force of governmental decree numbered 3837; before it's been a part of the Anadolu University with The Faculty of Kütahya Economics and Administrative Sciences which was established on 12 October 1974 as The Business Administration High School of Kütahya under the name of The Economics and Commercial Sciences Academy of Eskişehir.

The university has established and is keeping up close ties with universities abroad including University of Virginia in the United States, Brunel University in the United Kingdom, University of Pécs in Hungary and universities located at the member states of the former Soviet Union. Moreover, DPU hosts or takes part in the conferences, symposia, and cultural events organized by the collaborating institutions. Also the university is a member of the European University Association.

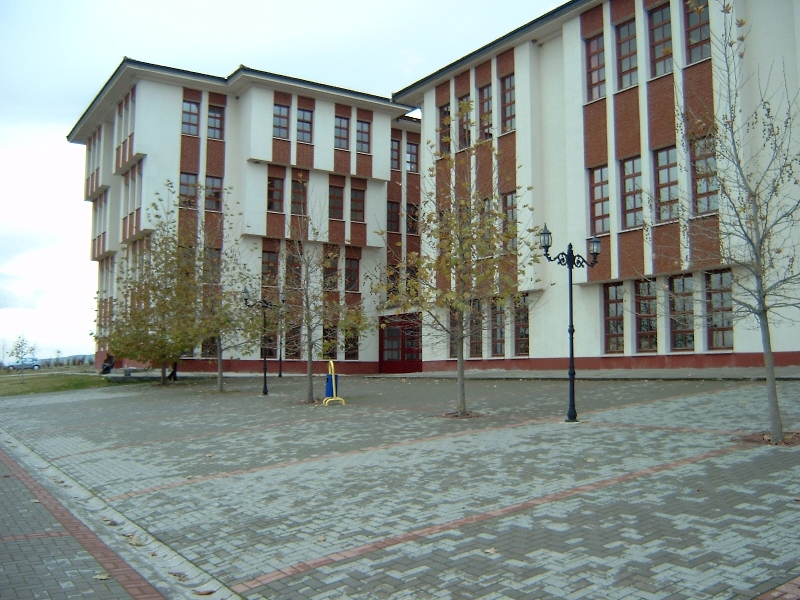
Institute of Social Sciences

== History ==
Kütahya Dumlupınar University was founded with date of 11 July 1992 and the number of 3837 law. This law also contained the foundation of the four faculties and two institute. Before had continued its activities under the name of Anadolu University Kütahya faculty of economics and administrative sciences and Kütahya vocational school constitute the university's seed.

On 12 October 1974 Kütahya faculty of economics and administrative sciences was founded under the name of Kütahya vocational school of administrative sciences connecting with the Eskişehir academy of economics and commerce sciences and started the education on 4 December 1974. Until 15 February 1979 it continues its activity of education as vocational school and beginning from this time it was transformed to the Kütahya the faculty of administrative sciences by the academy. After that, it was connected to the Eskişehir Anadolu university faculty of economics and administrative sciences with the date of 20 July 1982 and number of 41 governmental decree which has the force of law under the name of Kütahya administrative sciences. School lastly after 3 July 1992 continues its education activities connecting with the Dumlupınar university.

Kütahya vocational school started its education connecting with the minister of education in the 1975–1976 education time. From 11 July 1992 on it continues its education activities connecting with Kütahya Dumlupınar University.

The Faculty of Arts and Sciences, faculty of engineering, Simav faculty of technical education, Bilecik faculty of economics and administrative sciences and institutes of science and sociological sciences, Tavşanlı and Gediz vocational schools was found and started their activities in 1993–1994 education time. With the decision of the committee of advanced studies on 14 February 1994 and the number of 94.5.332 fourteen vocational schools were founded in the ten district of Kütahya and four district of Bilecik. For the 1996/8655 protocol between yök and ministry of health the faculty of health was added the university. With the date of 14 April 1999 and number of 23666 law the decision which was published in the official gazette the faculty of arts and sciences, faculty of education, faculty of fine arts, faculty of physical education were transformed into faculties. In the 2005–2006 educational time the practical sciences department was founded. With the law of 24 May 2006/10493 decision of the ministries institute of health sciences was founded.

With the law of 5662/29 May 2007 Bilecik university was founded and it was divided into one faculty and four vocational schools.

In 2007 the university continues its education activity with six faculties, three advanced schools, two institutes, totally 26,999 undergraduates, 789 lecturers and 556 administrative personal and in a closed area which covers about 191,965 square meters.

== Main campus ==
Located on the Kütahya-Tavşanlı highway, the main campus houses the Faculty of Arts and Sciences, Faculty of Engineering, Faculty of Economics and Administrative Sciences, Faculty of Education, Faculty of Medicine, Faculty of Fine Arts, Institute of Health Science, Institute of Social Sciences, Institute of Natural and Applied Sciences, Department of Information, Main Library, Health Centre and various indoor and outdoor sports facilities.

== Germiyan campus ==
The Germiyan campus is located on the Afyon-Kütahya highway eight kilometres away from the city center. The campus houses Kütahya Vocational School, the School of Physical Education and Sports and various indoor and outdoor sports facilities.

The students are being hosted either at public or private dormitories that have the capacity to host all the incoming students; the former located at the city center has a capacity of 2,000 students. Also there are dormitory buildings at the main campus with a capacity of 1,500 students.

DPU provides both its students and the local community with a wide collection of selected publications and regularly updated electronic sources in various fields through its libraries. The university provides its students with computing services offering Internet access in several computer laboratories throughout the university. Moreover, it offers competitive opportunities of research in various areas with its research and development laboratories that hold the latest technological improvements.

== Faculties, Departments and Schools ==
=== Undergraduate programs ===
- Faculty of Education
  - Computer and Teaching Sciences Training
  - Educational Sciences
  - Primary Education
  - Turkish Training
  - Special Training
  - Secondary Education Social Sciences Training
  - Secondary Education Life Sciences and Math Training
- Faculty of Arts and Sciences
  - Math
  - Physics
  - Chemistry
  - Biology
  - Biochemistry
  - Turkish Language and Literature
  - History
  - Archaeology
  - Sociology
  - Western Languages and Literature
  - Education Sciences
- Faculty of Fine Arts
  - Visual Communication Design
  - Painting
  - Ceramics and Glass
  - Interior Design
  - Handicrafts Design and Production
- Faculty of Economics and Administrative Sciences
  - Management
  - Economics
  - Public Administration
  - Public Finance
  - Political Science and International Relations
  - Econometrics
  - Human Resources Management
  - International Trade and Finance
- Faculty of Theology
  - Basic Islamic Sciences
  - Philosophy and Divinity
  - Islamic History and Arts
  - Primary School Teaching of Religion and Ethics
- Faculty of Architecture
  - Architecture
  - Industrial Design
  - City and Zone Planning
- Faculty of Engineering
  - Civil Engineering
  - Mechanical Engineering
  - Mining Engineering
  - Materials Science and Engineering
  - Electrical and Electronic Engineering
  - Industrial Engineering
  - Computer Engineering
  - Geological Engineering
- Simav Faculty of Technology
  - Manufacturing Engineering
  - Electrical and Electronic Engineering
  - Woodworking Industrial Engineering
  - Energy Systems Engineering
  - Control Engineering
  - Industrial Design Engineering
