= Gediz River =

River in Turkey

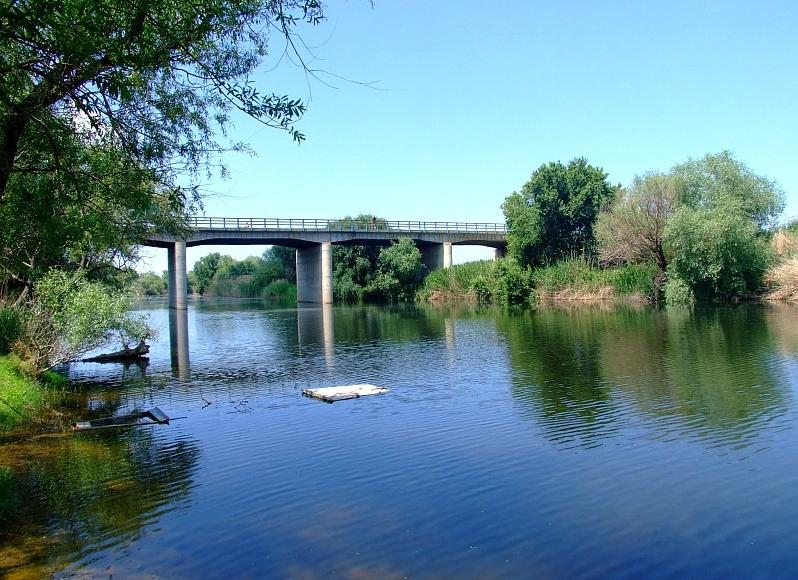
- Gediz River in its downstream section crossing İzmir Province

Location
- Country: Turkey

Physical characteristics
- Source: Mount Murat
  - location: Kütahya Province
- Mouth: Gediz River Delta
  - location: Foça, İzmir Province
  - coordinates: 38°35′18″N 26°48′57″E
- Length: 401 km (249 mi)

The Gediz River (Turkish: Gediz Nehri, Turkish pronunciation: [ˈɡediz]) is the second-longest river in Anatolia flowing into the Aegean Sea. From its source of Mount Murat in Kütahya Province, it flows generally west for 401 km (249 mi) to the Gediz River Delta in the Gulf of İzmir.

== Name ==
The ancient Greek name of the river was Hermos (Ἕρμος), Latinized as Hermus.

The name of the river Gediz may be related to the Lydian proper name Cadys; Gediz is also the name of a town near the river's sources. The name "Gediz" may also be encountered as a male given name in Turkey.

== Ancient geography ==
The Gediz is one of the two candidates for the Hittite placename Seha River, the other being the Bakırçay.

The Hermos separated Aeolia from Ionia, except for Ionic Phocaea, which was north of the Hermos. The valley of the Hermos was the heartland of the ancient Lydian Empire and overlooking the valley was the Lydian capital Sardis.

== Location ==
In Turkey's Aegean Region, Gediz River's length is second only to Büyük Menderes River whose flow is roughly parallel at a distance of slightly more than a hundred kilometers to the south.

Gediz River rises from Murat Mountain and Şaphane Mountain in Kütahya Province and flows through Uşak, Manisa and İzmir Provinces. It joins the sea in the northern section of the Gulf of İzmir, close to the gulf's mouth, near the village of Yenibağarası in Foça district, south of the center of the district.

The Gediz Basin lies between northern latitudes of 38°04’–39°13’ and southern longitudes of 26°42’–29°45’. It covers 2.2% of the total area of Turkey. Larger part of the alluvial plain called under the same name as the river (Gediz Plain) is within the area of Manisa Province and a smaller downstream section within İzmir Province.

== Environmental issues ==
The Gediz Delta is important as a nature reserve and is home to rare bird species. However, the reserve suffers from water shortages due to heavy demands from irrigation projects, connected to the Demirköprü Dam.

High level of urbanization and industrialization along its basin have caused the Gediz River to suffer severe pollution, particularly by sand and gravel quarries and the discharge of effluents from the leather industry. These factors contributed to the river's formerly rich fish reserves to become a thing of the past in recent years.

== See also ==
- Battle of the Gediz, near the river, during the Turkish War of Independence
- Gediz (town)
- Hermus (mythology)
