= List of populated places in Uşak Province =

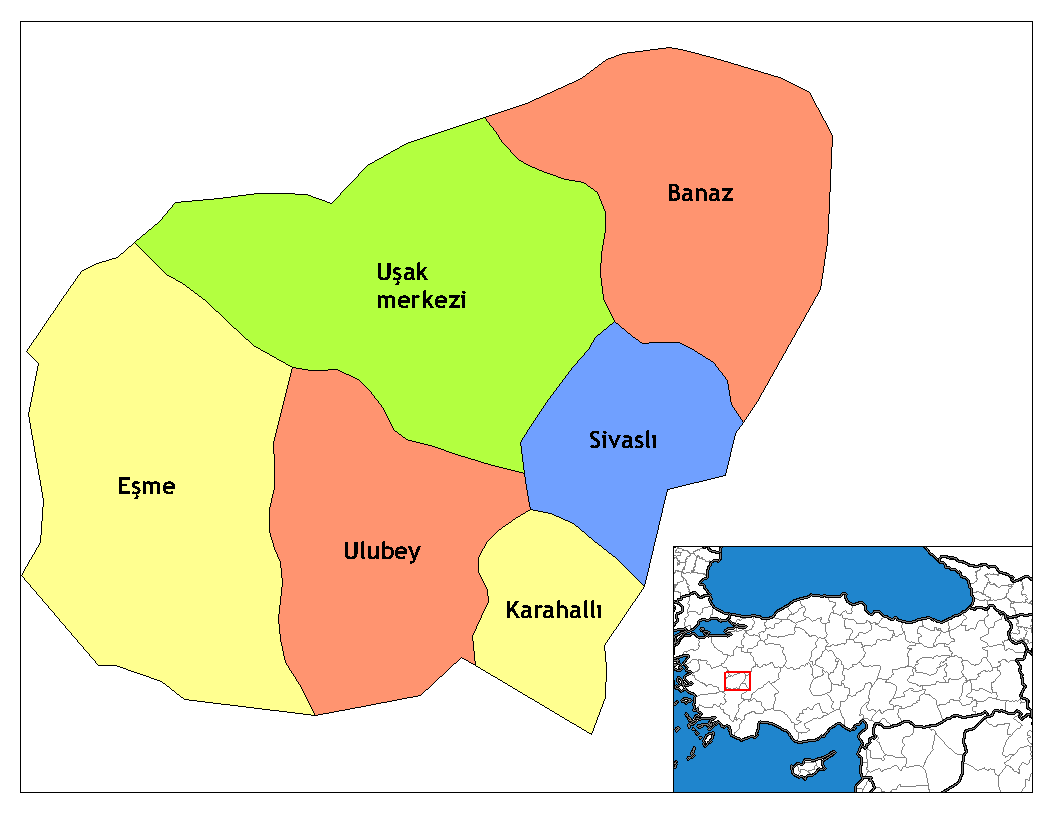
Uşak Province

Below is the list of populated places in Uşak Province, Turkey by the districts. In the following lists first place in each list is the administrative center of the district.

== Uşak ==
- Uşak
- Akbulak, Uşak
- Aktaş, Uşak
- Alanyurt, Uşak
- Altıntaş, Uşak
- Bağbaşı, Uşak
- Belkaya, Uşak
- Beylerhan, Uşak
- Boyalı, Uşak
- Bozköy, Uşak
- Bozkuş, Uşak
- Bölme, Uşak
- Buğdaylı, Uşak
- Ciğerdede, Uşak
- Çamyazı, Uşak
- Çamyuva, Uşak
- Çarık, Uşak
- Çatalbayır, Uşak
- Çevre, Uşak
- Çınarcık, Uşak
- Çukurağıl, Uşak
- Dağdemirler, Uşak
- Dağyenice, Uşak
- Demirören, Uşak
- Derbent, Uşak
- Dışkaya, Uşak
- Eğlence, Uşak
- Elmacık, Uşak
- Emirfakı, Uşak
- Eskigüney, Uşak
- Eskisaray, Uşak
- Eynihan, Uşak
- Fakılı, Uşak
- Göğem, Uşak
- Gökçedal, Uşak
- Gökçetepe, Uşak
- Gücer, Uşak
- Güneli, Uşak
- Güre, Uşak
- Hacıkadem, Uşak
- Halilefendiçiftliği, Uşak
- Hisar, Uşak
- Hocalar, Uşak
- İkisaray, Uşak
- İlyaslı, Uşak
- Kabaklar, Uşak
- Kalfa, Uşak
- Kapancık, Uşak
- Karaağaç, Uşak
- Karabeyli, Uşak
- Karacahisar, Uşak
- Karahasan, Uşak
- Karaköse, Uşak
- Karakuyu, Uşak
- Karlık, Uşak
- Kaşbelen, Uşak
- Kayağıl, Uşak
- Kediyünü, Uşak
- Kılcan, Uşak
- Kırka, Uşak
- Kısık, Uşak
- Koyunbeyli, Uşak
- Köprübaşı, Uşak
- Kuyucak, Uşak
- Mesudiye, Uşak
- Mollamusa, Uşak
- Muharremşah, Uşak
- Ormandamı, Uşak
- Ortabağ, Uşak
- Ortaköy, Uşak
- Ovademirler, Uşak
- Örencik, Uşak
- Paçacılar, Uşak
- Sarıdere, Uşak
- Selikler, Uşak
- Selviler, Uşak
- Selvioğlu, Uşak
- Sorkun, Uşak
- Susuzören, Uşak
- Şükraniye, Uşak
- Taşkonak, Uşak
- Ulucak, Uşak
- Üçkuyular, Uşak
- Ürün, Uşak
- Yapağılar, Uşak
- Yaşamışlar, Uşak
- Yavi, Uşak
- Yeniköy, Uşak
- Yenişehir, Uşak
- Yeşildere, Uşak
- Yoncalı, Uşak
- Zahman, Uşak

== Banaz ==
- Banaz
- Ahat, Banaz
- Alaba, Banaz
- Ayrancı, Banaz
- Ayvacık, Banaz
- Bağkonak, Banaz
- Bahadır, Banaz
- Balcıdamı, Banaz
- Baltalı, Banaz
- Banaz (village), Banaz
- Burhaniye, Banaz
- Büyükoturak, Banaz
- Corum, Banaz
- Çamsu, Banaz
- Çiftlik, Banaz
- Çöğürlü, Banaz
- Derbent, Banaz
- Dümenler, Banaz
- Düzkışla, Banaz
- Düzlüce, Banaz
- Gedikler, Banaz
- Güllüçam, Banaz
- Gürlek, Banaz
- Halaçlar, Banaz
- Hasanköy, Banaz
- Hatıplar, Banaz
- Kaplangı, Banaz
- Karacahisar, Banaz
- Karaköse, Banaz
- Kavacık, Banaz
- Kayılı, Banaz
- Kızılcaören, Banaz
- Kızılcasöğüt, Banaz
- Kızılhisar, Banaz
- Kuşdemir, Banaz
- Küçükler, Banaz
- Küçükoturak, Banaz
- Muratlı, Banaz
- Ovacık, Banaz
- Öksüz, Banaz
- Paşacık, Banaz
- Reşadiye, Banaz
- Susuz, Banaz
- Şaban, Banaz
- Ulupınar, Banaz
- Yazıtepe, Banaz
- Yenice, Banaz
- Yeşilyurt, Banaz

== Eşme ==
- Eşme
- Ağabey, Eşme
- Ahmetler, Eşme
- Akçaköy, Eşme
- Alahabalı, Eşme
- Alıçlı, Eşme
- Araplar, Eşme
- Armutlu, Eşme
- Aydınlı, Eşme
- Balabancı, Eşme
- Bekişli, Eşme
- Bozlar, Eşme
- Caberler, Eşme
- Camili, Eşme
- Cemalçavuş, Eşme
- Cevizli, Eşme
- Çalıkhasan, Eşme
- Çaykışla, Eşme
- Davutlar, Eşme
- Delibaşlı, Eşme
- Dereköy, Eşme
- Dereli, Eşme
- Dervişli, Eşme
- Emirli, Eşme
- Eşmeli, Eşme
- Eşmetaş, Eşme
- Gökçukur, Eşme
- Güllü, Eşme
- Güllübağ, Eşme
- Güney, Eşme
- Günyaka, Eşme
- Hamamdere, Eşme
- Hardallı, Eşme
- İsalar, Eşme
- Kandemirler, Eşme
- Karaahmetli, Eşme
- Karabacaklı, Eşme
- Karacaömerli, Eşme
- Katrancılar, Eşme
- Kayalı, Eşme
- Kayapınar, Eşme
- Kazaklar, Eşme
- Keklikli, Eşme
- Kıranköy, Eşme
- Kocabey, Eşme
- Kolankaya, Eşme
- Konak, Eşme
- Köseler, Eşme
- Köylüoğlu, Eşme
- Manavlı, Eşme
- Narıncalı, Eşme
- Narlı, Eşme
- Oymalı, Eşme
- Poslu, Eşme
- Saraycık, Eşme
- Şehitli, Eşme
- Takmak, Eşme
- Uluyayla, Eşme
- Yaylaköy, Eşme
- Yeleğen, Eşme
- Yeniköy, Eşme
- Yeşilkavak, Eşme

== Karahallı ==
- Karahallı
- Alfaklar, Karahallı
- Beki, Karahallı
- Buğdaylı, Karahallı
- Coğuplu, Karahallı
- Çokaklı, Karahallı
- Delihıdırlı, Karahallı
- Dumanlı, Karahallı
- Duraklı, Karahallı
- Karayakuplu, Karahallı
- Karbasan, Karahallı
- Kavaklı, Karahallı
- Kaykıllı, Karahallı
- Kırkyaren, Karahallı
- Külköy, Karahallı
- Paşalar, Karahallı

== Sivaslı ==
- Sivaslı
- Ağaçbeyli, Sivaslı
- Akarca, Sivaslı
- Azizler, Sivaslı
- Budaklar, Sivaslı
- Cinoğlan, Sivaslı
- Eldeniz, Sivaslı
- Erice, Sivaslı
- Hacim, Sivaslı
- Hanoğlu, Sivaslı
- Karaboyalık, Sivaslı
- Ketenlik, Sivaslı
- Kökez, Sivaslı
- Özbeyli, Sivaslı
- Pınarbaşı, Sivaslı
- Salmanlar, Sivaslı
- Samatlar, Sivaslı
- Sazak, Sivaslı
- Selçikler, Sivaslı
- Tatar, Sivaslı
- Yayalar, Sivaslı
- Yenierice, Sivaslı

== Ulubey ==
- Ulubey
- Akkeçili, Ulubey
- Aksaz, Ulubey
- Avgan, Ulubey
- Bekdemir, Ulubey
- Büyükkayalı, Ulubey
- Çamdere, Ulubey
- Çamlıbel, Ulubey
- Çardak, Ulubey
- Çırpıcılar, Ulubey
- Dutluca, Ulubey
- Gedikler, Ulubey
- Gümüşkol, Ulubey
- Hanyeri, Ulubey
- Hasköy, Ulubey
- İnay, Ulubey
- İshaklar, Ulubey
- Karacaahmet, Ulubey
- Kıran, Ulubey
- Kışla, Ulubey
- Köseler, Ulubey
- Kurudere, Ulubey
- Küçükilyaslı, Ulubey
- Küçükkayalı, Ulubey
- Külçen, Ulubey
- Omurca, Ulubey
- Söğütlü, Ulubey
- Sülümenli, Ulubey
