= List of municipalities in Uşak Province =

This is a list of municipalities in Uşak Province, Turkey as of March 2023.

District	Municipality
Banaz	Banaz
Banaz	Kızılcasöğüt
Eşme	Eşme
Eşme	Yeleğen
Karahallı	Karahallı
Sivaslı	Pınarbaşı
Sivaslı	Selçikler
Sivaslı	Sivaslı
Sivaslı	Tatar
Ulubey	Ulubey
Uşak	Uşak
