= Sülümenli, Ulubey =

Sülümenli
- Municipality
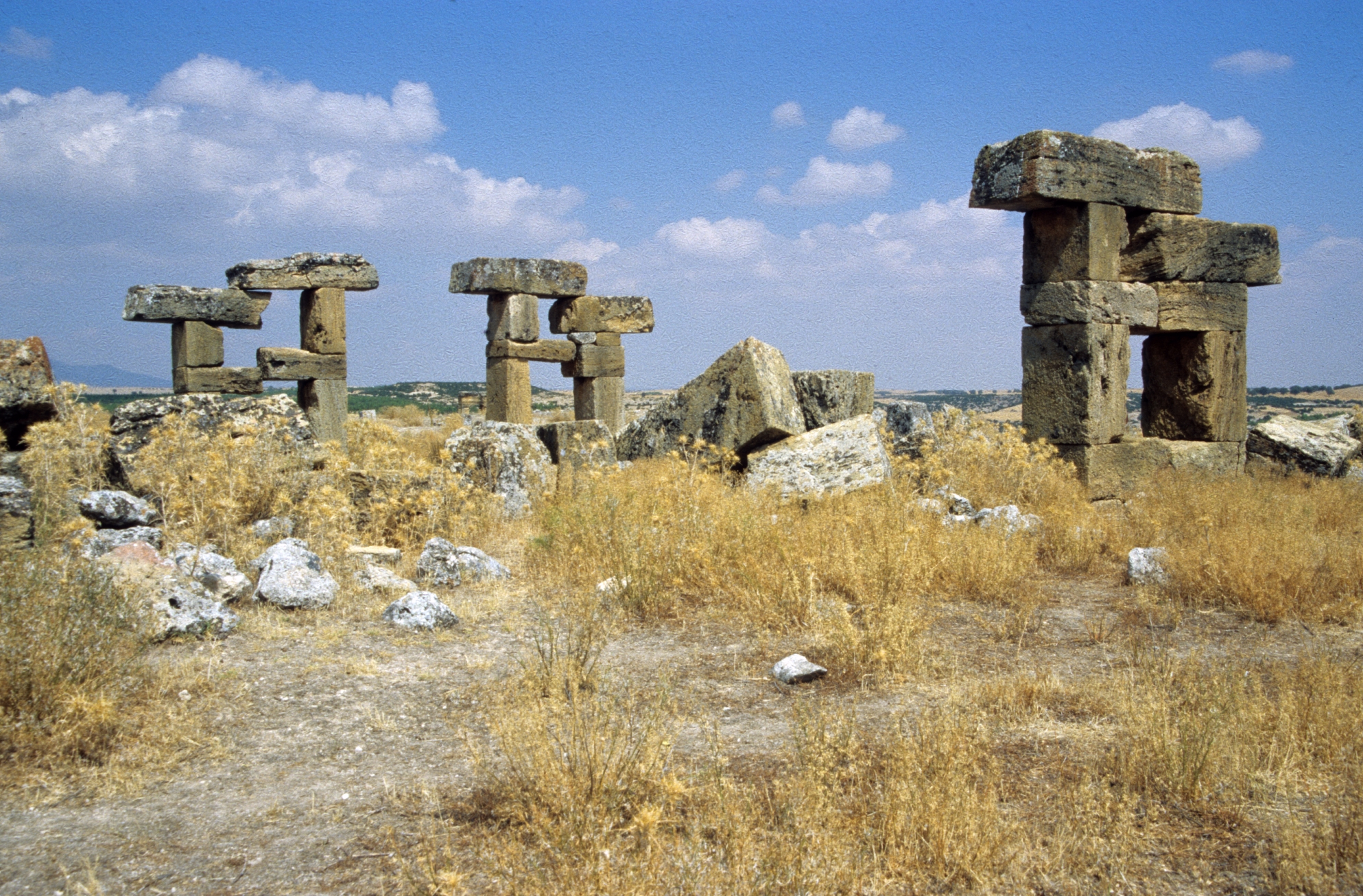
- Ruins of Blaundos.

- Location within Turkey Location within Turkey Aegean
- Coordinates: 38°25′N 29°17′E
- Country: Turkey
- Province: Uşak
- District: Ulubey
- Time zone: UTC+3 (TRT)

Sülümenli is a town in the county of Ulubey, outside of Uşak Turkey.

== History ==
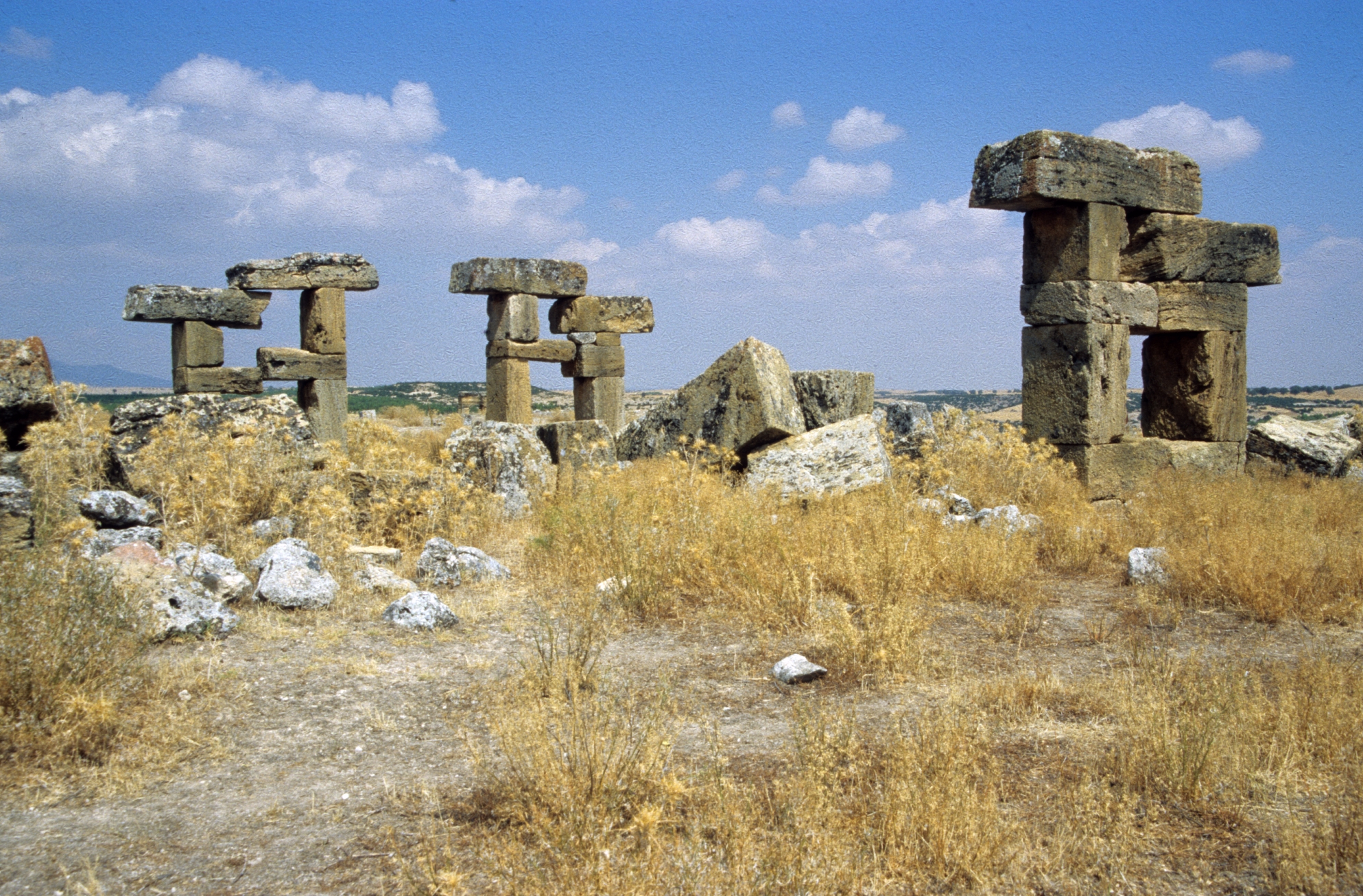
Ruins of Blaundos.

Founded in 334 BC by the Macedonians the city, close to the border of Phrygia and Lydia, was a military town that maintained its position in strategic importance throughout Hellenistic Roman and Byzantine. The city's name at this time was Blaundos verified in 1845. W. J. Ulubey found Hamilton by finding an inscription in the ruins of the town that read "Blaundeo of the Macedonian (Macedonian Blaundus on)."

The city fell to the Turks in the 12th century.

== Geography ==
Uşak is 45 km, and Ulubey is 15 km from the town, and located north is the village of Gedikler.

=== Climate ===
The town is in a region where summers are a hot and dry continental climate, while winters are cold and snowy.

== Village population data by year ==
Year	Population
2007	212
2000	201
1990	202

== Economy ==
The local economy is based on agriculture and livestock production especially cereals and tobacco production.

== Infrastructure ==
The village has a primary school and town drinking water supply but has no health care services. There are the ruins of the ancient city of Blaundos at the village.
