= Ulubey Canyon Nature Park =

Park in Uşak Province, Turkey

- Ulubey Kanyonu Tabiat Parkı
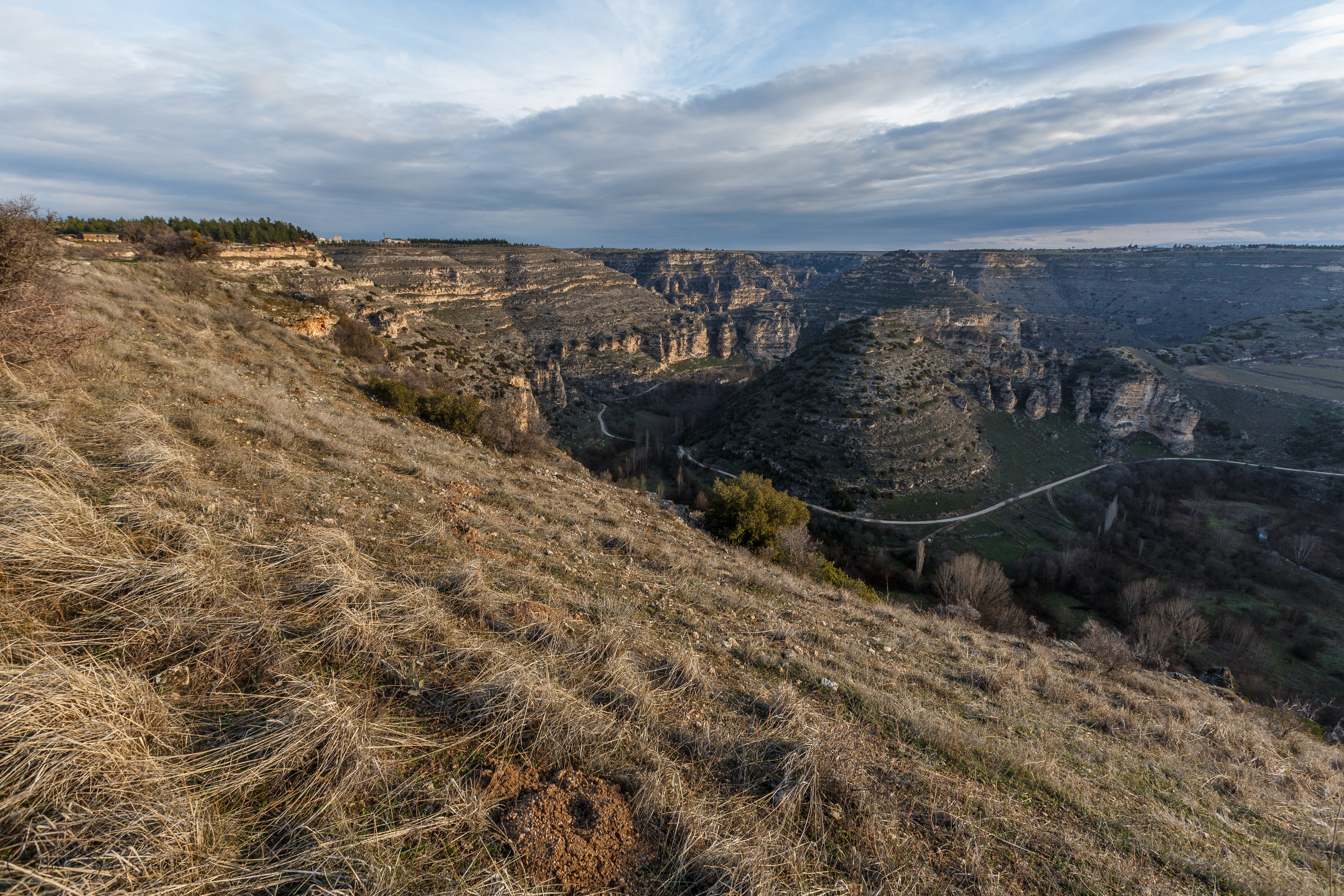

- Location within Turkey
- Location: Ulubey, Uşak Province, Turkey
- Nearest city: Ulubey, Uşak
- Coordinates: 38°23′04″N 29°17′59″E
- Area: 119 hectares (290 acres)
- Established: August 7, 2013; 12 years ago
- Governing body: Directorate-General of Nature Protection and National Parks; Ministry of Environment and Forest

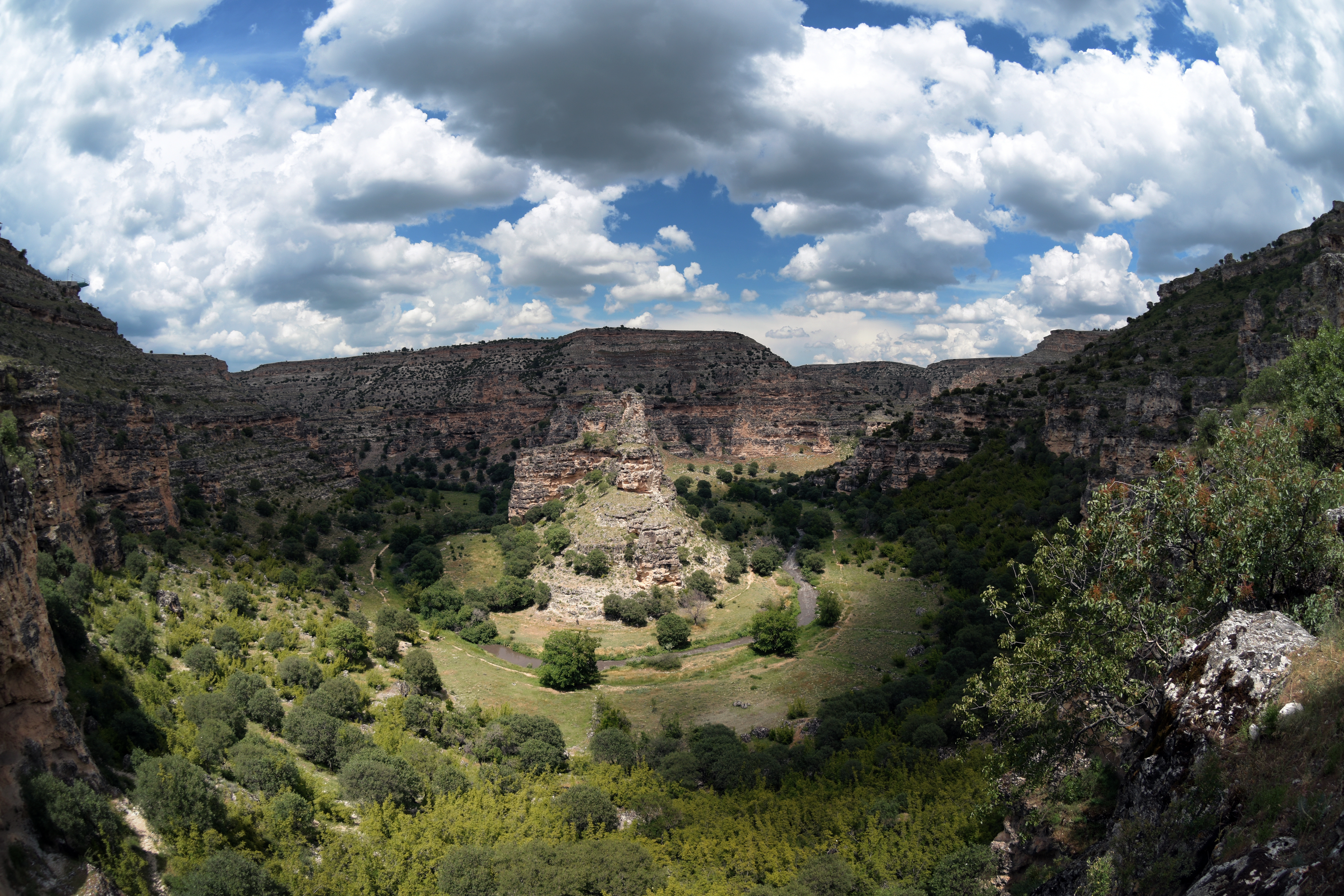
A view of Ulubey Canyon.

Ulubey Canyon Nature Park (Turkish: Ulubey Kanyonu Tabiat Parkı) is a nature park in the Ulubey and Karahallı districts of Uşak Province, Turkey. The park provides suitable habitat for many species of animals and plants and is being developed as a centre for ecotourism.

== Canyon ==
Ulubey Canyon covers an area of 119 hectares (290 acres). It is 100–500 m (330–1,640 ft) wide and 135–170 m (443–558 ft) deep, with a total length of 40–45 km (25–28 mi). The streams Ulubey Creek and Banaz Creek (tributaries of Büyük Menderes River) run through the Ulubey Canyon. The main canyon along both creeks has tens of big lateral canyons. The walls of the canyon are 10–30 m (33–98 ft) and 50–55 m (164–180 ft) high. At least three terraces are visible in the canyon walls. In addition, there are many conical karstic hills along the canyon.

== Climate ==
Being in a transitional zone between the Aegean and Central Anatolia regions, Uşak Province exhibits the climate characteristics of both regions. The summer months are warmer and more arid than in the Aegean region, and the winter season is milder than in the Central Anatolian region. Rain brought by air masses from over the Aegean Sea generates a more humid climate than in Central Anatolia. Average annual precipitation is 551 mm (21.7 in). Monthly or seasonal distribution of precipitation is irregular.

== Ecology ==
=== Flora ===
Plants growing in the nature park include the Turkish pine (Pinus brutia), rockrose (Cistus), oak (Quercus ithaburensis), Turkey oak (Quercus cerris), salt cedar (Tamarix), sumac (Rhus), hackberry (Celtis), broom (Genista), mullein (Verbascum), milkvetch (Astragalus) and wild marjoram (Origanum).

=== Fauna ===
The nature park provides suitable habitat for mammals such as the wild boar, hare, fox, jackal, gray wolf (Canis lupus), Indian porcupine (Hystrix indica), porcupine and jerboa, the reptiles tortoise, striped viper (Montivipera xanthina), the bird species red-legged partridge, common buzzard, hawk, common raven (Corvus corax), the fish species European chub (Squalius cephalus), catfish and the insect species multiple-eyespotted blue butterfly.

== Ecotourism ==
The area hosted many civilizations in the past including Lydia, Achaemenid Empire, Macedonia, Kingdom of Pergamon, Roman Empire, Byzantine Empire, Germiyanids and finally Ottoman Empire.

The canyon system of Banaz-Ulubey has a significant potential for ecotourism in the country. In August 2013, the canyon was declared a nature park by the Ministry of Forest and Water Management. In 2015, a 135 m^{2} (1,450 sq ft) glass-floor observation deck in the form of a ship bow, constructed 131 m (430 ft) above the canyon floor, and a cafeteria were opened for tourism purposes. Hiking, trekking and camping using tents are popular outdoor activities in the canyon area. It was reported in June 2015 that about 40,000 tourists visited the nature park in one month. The number of visitors in one month rose to nearly 100,000 by March 2016.

Notable places in the region are Cilandiras Bridge, Duraklı Rock-cut tombs, Hasköy monuments, Pepuza, and Blaundus ancient towns, and Salma Creek.

== Access ==
The nature park is situated in the districts of Ulubey and Karahallı of Uşak Province on the road Uşak-Karahallı. The nearest town to the nature park is Ulubey at a distance of 1 km (0.62 mi) to the south. The town Ulubey is located 29 km (18 mi) southwest of Uşak. Public transport is available between the two locations throughout the day.
