= Lake Sülüklü =

Lake Sülüklü (Turkish: Sülüklü Göl), for "Lake of Leeches", is the name of several lakes in Turkey. It may refer to:

- Lake Sülüklü (Bolu), a lake at Tavşansuyu village of Mudurnu district in Bolu Province, Turkey
- Lake Sülüklü (Elazığ), a lake at Balkayası village of AAğın district in Elazığ Province, Turkey
- Lake Sülüklü (Gaziantep), a lake at Şehitkamil district in Gaziantep Province, Turkey
- Lake Sülüklü (Uşak), a lake at Banaz district in Uşak Province, Turkey
