= Ulubey =

Ulubey may refer to:

- Ulubey, Ordu, a district of Ordu Province, Turkey
- Ulubey, Uşak, a district of Uşak Province, Turkey
  - Ulubey Canyon, a canyon in the district
