= Karbasan =

Karbasan Gariphasan
- Neighbourhood
- Location in Turkey Karbasan (Turkey Aegean)
- Coordinates: 38°17′N 29°35′E
- Country: Turkey
- Province: Uşak
- District: Karahallı
- Municipality: Karahallı
- Elevation: 960 m (3,150 ft)
- Population (2022): 1,259
- Time zone: UTC+3 (TRT)
- Postal code: 64720
- Area code: 0276

Karbasan is a neighbourhood of the town Karahallı, Uşak Province, Turkey. Its population is 1,259 (2022). Before the 2013 reorganisation, it was a town (belde). It is situated to the southeast of Karahallı. The distance to Karahallı is 6 kilometres (3.7 mi) and to Uşak is 65 kilometres (40 mi). According to mayor's page the Karbasan was founded about seven centuries ago by a certain Garip Hasan and was named after him. In popular speech, the name Gariphasan was converted to Karbasan. During the last years of the Ottoman Empire the medrese (Islamic school) in Karbasan was locally well known. In 1992, it was declared a seat of township.
