= Banaz District =

District of Uşak Province, Turkey

- District
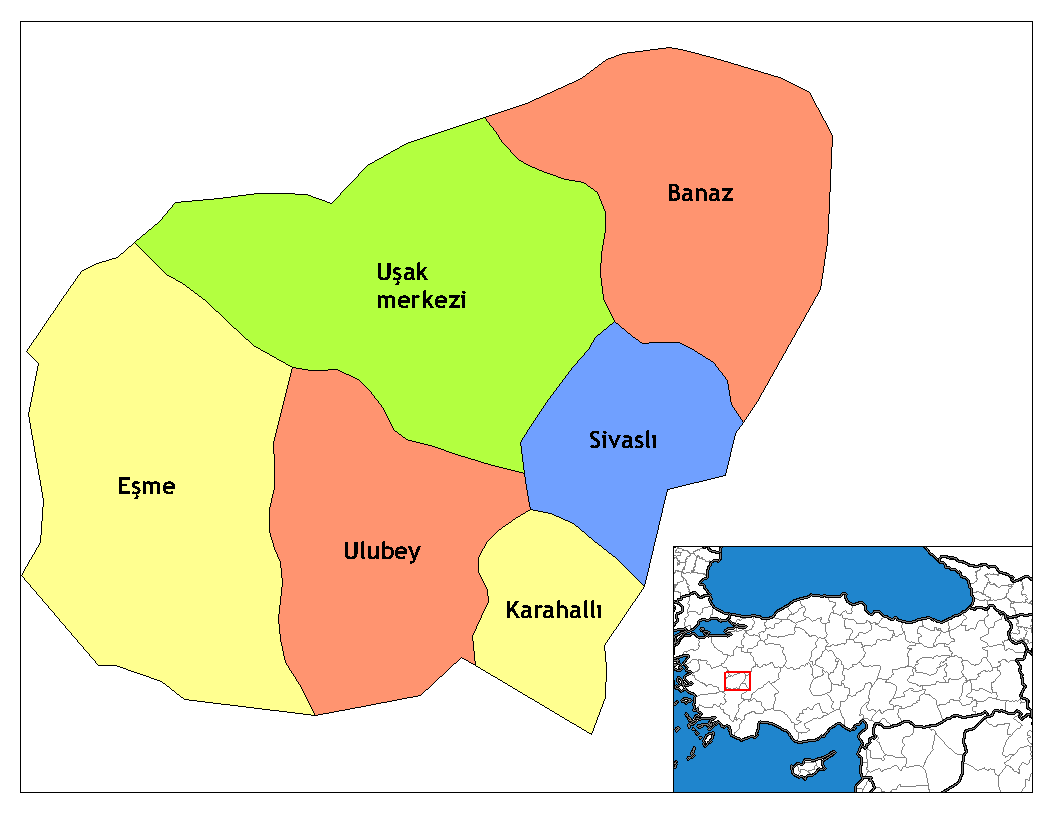
- Map showing the districts of Uşak Province

- Location in Turkey Banaz District (Turkey Aegean)
- Coordinates: 38°44′N 29°45′E
- Country: Turkey
- Province: Uşak
- Seat: Banaz

Government
  - Kaymakam: Musa Aydemir
- Area: 1,114 km^{2} (430 sq mi)
- Population (2022): 35,181
  - Density: 31.58/km^{2} (81.79/sq mi)
- Time zone: UTC+3 (TRT)
- Website: www.banaz.gov.tr

Banaz District is a district of the Uşak Province of Turkey. Its seat is the town of Banaz. Its area is 1,114 km^{2}, and its population is 35,181 (2022). Banaz district area neighbors those of two other districts of the same province, namely Sivaslı District and Uşak District from its south to its west, ranges three districts of Kütahya Province, Gediz District, Altıntaş District and Dumlupınar District, along its north, and adjoins three districts of Afyonkarahisar Province, namely Sandıklı District, Sinanpaşa District and Hocalar District to its east.

The district extends on a large and fertile plain (Banaz Plain - Banaz Ovası), and it is an area of intense and varied agricultural production, as well as of dense forestation. The stream that crosses and feeds the plain carries the name Banaz as well (Banaz Çayı) and it later joins Büyük Menderes River. Sugarbeet and opium are the principal agricultural products that are grown in Banaz. Another notable feature of the district is the presence of several hot thermal springs, some of which, such as those at localities called Evrendede, Çatalçam and Hamamboğazı have been arranged to serve as health centers with accommodation and as recreational areas.

== Composition ==
There are two municipalities in Banaz District:

- Banaz
- Kızılcasöğüt

There are 46 villages in Banaz District:

- Ahat
- Alaba
- Ayrancı
- Bağkonak
- Bahadır
- Balcıdamı
- Baltalı
- Banaz
- Burhaniye
- Büyükoturak
- Çamsu
- Çiftlik
- Çöğürlü
- Corum
- Derbent
- Dümenler
- Düzkışla
- Düzlüce
- Gedikler
- Güllüçam
- Gürlek
- Halaçlar
- Hasanköy
- Hatipler
- İmrez
- Kaplangı
- Karacahisar
- Karaköse
- Kavacık
- Kayılı
- Kızılcaören
- Kızılhisar
- Küçükler
- Küçükoturak
- Kuşdemir
- Muratlı
- Öksüz
- Ovacık
- Paşacık
- Reşadiye
- Şaban
- Susuz
- Ulupınar
- Yazıtepe
- Yenice
- Yeşilyurt
