= Omurca =

- Village
- Location within Turkey Location within Turkey Aegean
- Coordinates: 38°32′N 29°16′E
- Country: Turkey
- Province: Uşak
- District: Ulubey
- Elevation: 950 m (3,120 ft)
- Population (2022): 479
- Time zone: UTC+3 (TRT)
- Postal code: 64900
- Area code: 0276

Omurca is a village in Ulubey District of Uşak Province, Turkey. Its population is 479 (2022). Before the 2013 reorganisation, it was a town (belde). It is situated to the south of Uşak and to the north of Ulubey. The distance to Ulubey is 18 kilometres (11 mi) and to Uşak is 24 kilometres (15 mi). The settlement was founded by nomadic Turkmens. The name of the town probably refers to Umur Bey of the Aydın Beylik who lived in the early 14th century. In 1999 it was declared a seat of township. But the population has since been decreased. Main agricultural crops of the town are barley, wheat and hashish (under government supervision). Animal breeding is another economic activity.
