= Takmak, Eşme =

Takmak
- Village
- Location within Turkey Location within Turkey Aegean
- Coordinates: 38°26′55″N 28°58′37″E
- Country: Turkey
- Province: Uşak
- District: Eşme
- Population (2022): 454
- Time zone: UTC+3 (TRT)

Takmak is a village in Eşme District of Uşak Province, Turkey. Its population is 454 (2022). The village is famous for its rugs. But nowadays rug production is reduced.

Takmak is 6 km from the town of Eşme. It has a continental climate transitioning to a Mediterranean climate and there was a Greek speaking population in the town until 1922.

== Population ==
Historical population
Year	Pop.	±% p.a.
1990	785	—
1997	671	−2.22%
2007	588	−1.31%
2012	540	−1.69%
2017	489	−1.96%
2022	454	−1.47%
Source: 1990 census, 1997 census and TÜIK (2007-2022)

== Economy ==
Like most villages in the district the village economy of agriculture and animal husbandry is based mainly on tobacco farming, which has fallen dramatically in the past years. Today's main agricultural activities; wheat, barley, vetch, corn, and bean cultivation. There are a limited number of families dealing vineyard. Livestock breeding cattle in the foreground. The milk produced is sold to various milk factory obtained a substantial income.

== Archaeology ==
Ruins near Takmak have been tentatively identified as the remains of Mesotymolus, a Byzantine era City and Bishopric.
