= Külköy =

- Village
- Location within Turkey Location within Turkey Aegean
- Coordinates: 38°21′43″N 29°32′07″E
- Country: Turkey
- Province: Uşak
- District: Karahallı
- Elevation: 872 m (2,861 ft)
- Population (2022): 726
- Time zone: UTC+3 (TRT)
- Postal code: 64700

Külköy is a village in the Karahallı District of the Uşak Province in Turkey, in the Aegean Region. Its population is 726 as of 2022. It is about 4 km away from the town of Karahallı. The village has a primary school.

The remains of a Byzantine church were discovered in Külköy at the end of the 20th century.
