= Büyükoturak =

- Village
- Location within Turkey Location within Turkey Aegean
- Coordinates: 38°50′N 29°56′E
- Country: Turkey
- Province: Uşak
- District: Banaz
- Elevation: 1,080 m (3,540 ft)
- Population (2022): 720
- Time zone: UTC+3 (TRT)
- Postal code: 64510
- Area code: 0276

Büyükoturak is a village in Banaz District of Uşak Province, Turkey. Its population is 720 (2022). Before the 2013 reorganisation, it was a town (belde). It is situated to the south of Turkish state highway D.300 which connects Uşak and İzmir to Central Anatolia. The distance to Banaz is 21 kilometres (13 mi) and to Uşak is 51 kilometres (32 mi). The antiques found close to the railway station are from the Bronze Age. But the settlement was founded during the Ottoman Empire era by the nomads. In 1957 it was declared a seat of township. Orcharding is the main economic sector of the town. There is also a coal seam around the town
