= Eibeos =

Town of ancient Phrygia

Coordinates: 38°34′23″N 29°42′48″E

Eibeos was a town of ancient Phrygia, inhabited in Roman and Byzantine times.

Its site is located near Eldeniz (Sivaslı District) in Asiatic Turkey.
