= Kaplangı, Banaz =

Village in Uşak Province, Turkey

Kaplangı is a village (officially a neighborhood) in the Banaz district of Uşak province, Turkey. Its population is 428 (2009) and its surface area is 7.9 square kilometers.

The village is south of the Ankara–İzmir highway (D300), approximately 15 kilometers from the town of Banaz. The village economy is based on agriculture, including wheat, barley, chickpeas, lentils, beans, beets, poppies, and Napoleon cherries. The village is also known for its carpets (halı), rugs (kilim), and saddlecloths (çul).

== Name ==
According to local legend, the village is named Kaplangı because when it was founded, the area was heavily forested and believed to be home to lions and tigers (or leopards) and thus was originally called Kaplan Kırı (kaplan, "tiger, leopard" + kır, "country").

== History ==
In ancient times, the area was known for its vineyards.

According to some Ottoman sources, Kaplangı was the location of a tomb of Karaca Ahmet (a companion of Hacı Bektaş Veli), as well as a zawiya associated with Karaca Ahmet.

Kaplangı is listed as a village in Ottoman financial records for 1834, 1836, 1838, and 1839. It is listed in government records as providing income to the foundation (vakıf) of the Sheikh Koca Zawiya (Şeyh Koca Zaviyesi) in 1860 and 1862–63.

Its population is recorded as 35 (3 households) for 1898–99.

In March 1921, during the Turkish War of Independence, the Banaz area was occupied by Greek forces. On August 29, 1922, Turkish forces captured Kaplangı. On the night of August 30–31, skirmishes occurred between Turkish and Greek forces on Kaplangı Mountain and other nearby mountains south and southwest of the village. On August 31, Greek forces retreated in disarray toward İzmir. The Turkish army entered Banaz on August 31, 1922.

The population of the village reached 794 in 1965.
