= Dışkaya, Uşak =

Dışkaya
- Village
- Location within Turkey Location within Turkey Aegean
- Coordinates: 38°35′53″N 28°51′25″E
- Country: Turkey
- Province: Uşak
- District: Uşak
- Population (2022): 92
- Time zone: UTC+3 (TRT)

Dışkaya is a village in Uşak District of Uşak Province, Turkey. Its population is 92 (2022). The village has existed since the kingdom of Lydia when it was known as Tabala and was founded where the Persian Royal Road crossed the Gediz River. The town of Uşak is 52 km away. The village has a continental climate.

== Population ==
Historical population
Year	Pop.	±% p.a.
1990	214	—
1997	226	+0.78%
2007	123	−5.90%
2012	117	−1.00%
2017	101	−2.90%
2022	92	−1.85%
Source: 1990 census, 1997 census and TÜIK (2007-2022)

== Economy ==
The economy of the village depends on agriculture and husbandry.

The village has a primary school, drinking water network, but no sewerage system. The newly opened health center was shut down in July 2010. The village has asphalt roads connecting the village and has electricity and landline telephone.
