= Ulubey District, Uşak =

District of Uşak Province, Turkey

Ulubey District
- District
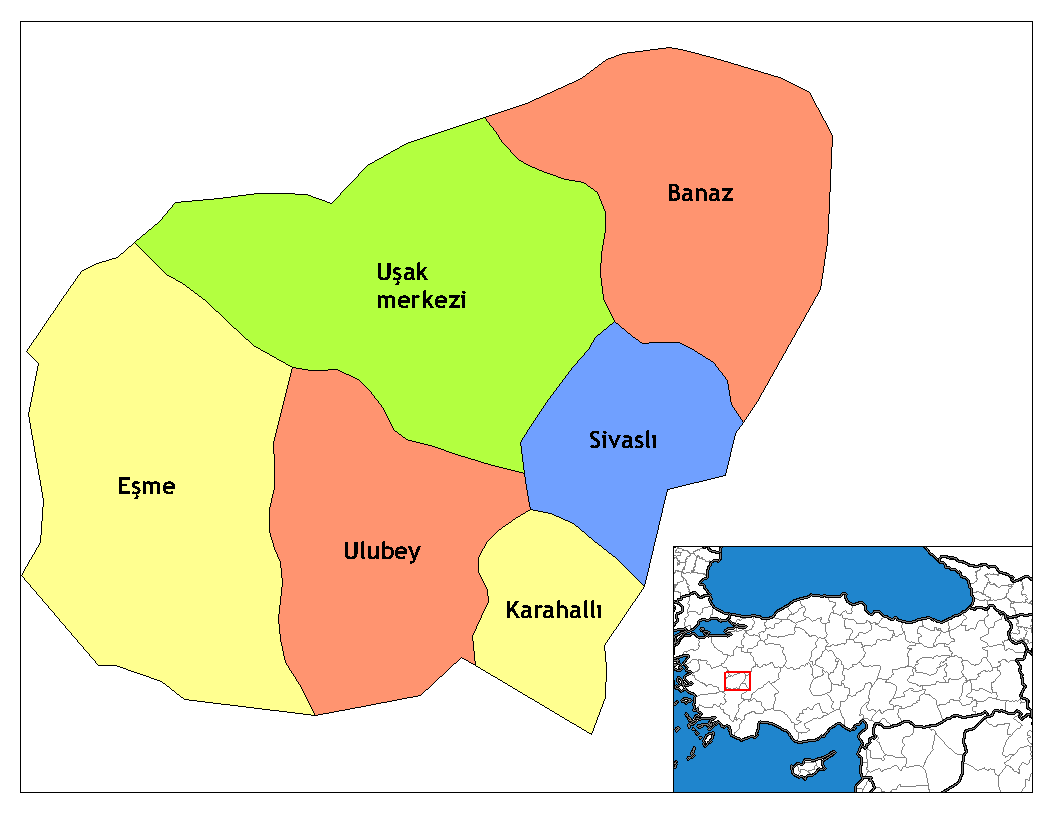
- Map showing the districts of Uşak Province

- Location in Turkey Ulubey District (Turkey Aegean)
- Coordinates: 38°25′N 29°17′E
- Country: Turkey
- Province: Uşak
- Seat: Ulubey

Government
  - Kaymakam: İsmail Erdoğan
- Area: 828 km^{2} (320 sq mi)
- Population (2022): 12,024
  - Density: 15/km^{2} (38/sq mi)
- Time zone: UTC+3 (TRT)
- Website: www.ulubey.gov.tr

Ulubey District is a district of the Uşak Province of Turkey. Its seat is the town of Ulubey. Its area is 828 km^{2}, and its population is 12,024 (2022). The district is famous for Ulubey Canyon and the ruins of ancient Blaundus.

== Composition ==
There is one municipality in Ulubey District:

- Ulubey

There are 26 villages in Ulubey District:

- Akkeçili
- Aksaz
- Bekdemir
- Büyükkayalı
- Çamdere
- Çamlıbel
- Çardak
- Çırpıcılar
- Dutluca
- Gedikler
- Gümüşkol
- Hanyeri
- Hasköy
- İnay
- İshaklar
- Karacaahmet
- Kıran
- Kışla
- Köseler
- Küçükilyaslı
- Küçükkayalı
- Külçen
- Kurudere
- Omurca
- Söğütlü
- Sülümenli
