= Düzkışla, Banaz =

Village in Uşak Province, Turkey

Düzkışla is a neighborhood (village) in the Banaz District of Uşak Province in Turkey. Its population is 144 (2020). It is located approximately 19 kilometers southeast of Banaz, on a plateau at an altitude of about 1200 meters.

== Name ==
The name of the village means, literally, "flat barracks" (Turkish: düz, "flat", + kışla, "barracks" or "winter quarters").

== History ==
The date of the founding of the village is not known, but it is reported to have been founded by nomadic Yörüks.

== Economy ==
The village economy is agricultural, based on sheep, goats, wheat, barley, lentils, and chickpeas.

== Local features ==
To the northeast of the village in the locality of Ahlatlı is the Düzkışla Höyük, the remains of a Late Neolithic-Early Chalcolithic settlement.

To the north of the village is the Düzkışla Ruins Höyük (Düzkışla Ören Höyük Mevkii), the remains of a small settlement, probably from late antiquity.

To the northeast of the village is the Düzkışla Lake and Irrigation Facility, a dam and reservoir opened in 2015 for irrigation.
