= Güre, Uşak =

Güre
- Village
- Location within Turkey Location within Turkey Aegean
- Coordinates: 38°39′N 29°10′E
- Country: Turkey
- Province: Uşak
- District: Uşak
- Elevation: 600 m (2,000 ft)
- Population (2022): 827
- Time zone: UTC+3 (TRT)
- Postal code: 64460
- Area code: 0276

Güre is a village in the Uşak District of Uşak Province, Turkey. Its population is 827 (2022). Before the 2013 reorganisation, it was a town (belde). It is on the Turkish state highway D.300 which connects İzmir to Ankara. It is 25 kilometres (16 mi) west of Uşak. Güre is known as the home town of the (so called) " Treasures of Croesus" (Turkish: Karun hazineleri) findings from Lydian tumuli around the town. The findings were plundered in the 1960s but recovered by the 2000s and now they are being kept in Uşak Museum.
