= Selçikler =

- Municipality
- Location in Turkey Selçikler (Turkey Aegean)
- Coordinates: 38°30′N 29°40′E
- Country: Turkey
- Province: Uşak
- District: Sivaslı
- Elevation: 900 m (3,000 ft)
- Population (2022): 1,744
- Time zone: UTC+3 (TRT)
- Postal code: 64840
- Area code: 0276

Selçikler is a town (belde) in the Sivaslı District, Uşak Province, Turkey. Its population is 1,744 (2022). It is 2 kilometres (1.2 mi) west of Sivaslı. The distance to Uşak is about 36 kilometres (22 mi). Selçikler was founded on a hill. During archaeological research carried on between 1966-1978 the hill was found to be a tumulus inhabited during the ancient ages. During the Byzantine Empire the settlement was the town of Sebaste.
