= Kızılcasöğüt =

- Municipality
- Location in Turkey Kızılcasöğüt (Turkey Aegean)
- Coordinates: 38°39′N 29°40′E
- Country: Turkey
- Province: Uşak
- District: Banaz
- Elevation: 925 m (3,035 ft)
- Population (2022): 1,819
- Time zone: UTC+3 (TRT)
- Postal code: 64520
- Area code: 0276

Kızılcasöğüt (literally "Red willow") is a town (belde) in the Banaz District, Uşak Province, Turkey. Its population is 1,819 (2022). It is 24 kilometres (15 mi) southwest of Banaz and 30 kilometres (19 mi) east of Uşak. The town was founded 500 years ago. In 1977, it was declared a seat of township. Main crops of the town are cereals, lentil, gram, bean, hash and grapes. There are also carpenter shops in the town.
