= Kışla, Ulubey =

Kışla
- Village
- Location within Turkey Location within Turkey Aegean
- Coordinates: 38°28′14″N 29°11′43″E
- Country: Turkey
- Province: Uşak
- District: Ulubey
- Elevation: 825 m (2,707 ft)
- Population (2022): 551
- Time zone: UTC+3 (TRT)
- Area code: 0276

Kışla is a village in Ulubey District of Uşak Province, Turkey. Its population is 551 (2022).

Its distance to Ulubey is 13 kilometres (8.1 mi) and to Uşak is 36 kilometres (22 mi) There are some Lydian ruins around Kışla. But there is no written document about the ancient history of the village . The oldest mosque in the village was built around 1730s. Probably the Turkmens used the village as a winter settlement and named it Kışlak meaning winter settlement of the nomads. The village was declared a town (belde) by establishing a municipality in 1999. But at the 2013 Turkish local government reorganisation the municipality was disestablished.
