= Kurşunluk =

Kurşunluk Bölme
- Neighbourhood
- Location in Turkey Kurşunluk (Turkey Aegean)
- Coordinates: 38°37′N 29°22′E
- Country: Turkey
- Province: Uşak
- District: Uşak
- Municipality: Uşak
- Elevation: 900 m (3,000 ft)
- Population (2022): 2,455
- Time zone: UTC+3 (TRT)
- Postal code: 64420
- Area code: 0276

Kurşunluk (formerly: Bölme) is a neighbourhood of the city Uşak, Uşak Province, Turkey. Its population is 2,455 (2022). It is just 5 kilometres (3.1 mi) south west of Uşak. The settlement was founded about 200 years ago and it was declared a seat of township in 1999. The main economic activity is dairying. Cereal agriculture is another activity.
