= Lake Sülüklü (Uşak) =

Lake in Turkey

Coordinates: 38.8972°N 29.8961°E

Lake Sülüklü (Turkish: Sülüklü Göl), for "Lake of the Leeches", is a freshwater lake located at Banaz district in Uşak Province, Turkey.
