= Muharremşah, Uşak =

Muharremşah
- Neighbourhood
- Location in Turkey Muharremşah (Turkey Aegean)
- Coordinates: 38°38′43″N 29°28′36″E
- Country: Turkey
- Province: Uşak
- District: Uşak
- Municipality: Uşak
- Population (2022): 3,149
- Time zone: UTC+3 (TRT)

Muharremşah is a neighbourhood of the city Uşak, Uşak Province, Turkey. Its population is 3,149 (2022). It is located in the southeast of the city, 7 km from the city center. Along with its historical features it is situated on fertile lands. The most common occupations are agriculture which is seen as the main source of income for villagers (the annual income of only tomato farming is estimated as nearly $4.000.000) and animal husbandry. However, due to the expansion of settlements and the industrial area, the future of agriculture in the village is under threat.

In the village in which the first education institution was founded in 1944, there are currently two educational institutions, the primary and secondary schools with a total number of about 200 students. The village has important historic buildings such as Çanlı Bridge, which was built in the 13th century in the day of Seljuq Dynasty. According to the bridge's tablet the exact construction date is A.C 1255. In 2015 the bridge which had been facing with the danger of destruction in recent years because of the river carrying chemical waste and many other reasons like treasure hunting was restored.
