= Governor of Uşak =

Governor of a Turkish Province

Governor of Uşak Uşak Valiliği
- Logo of the Governor of Uşak
- Incumbent; Serdar Kartal since January 27, 2026
- Appointer: President of Turkey; On the recommendation of the Turkish government
- Term length: No set term length or limit
- Inaugural holder: Ekrem Baydar; 1937
- Website: Office of the Governor

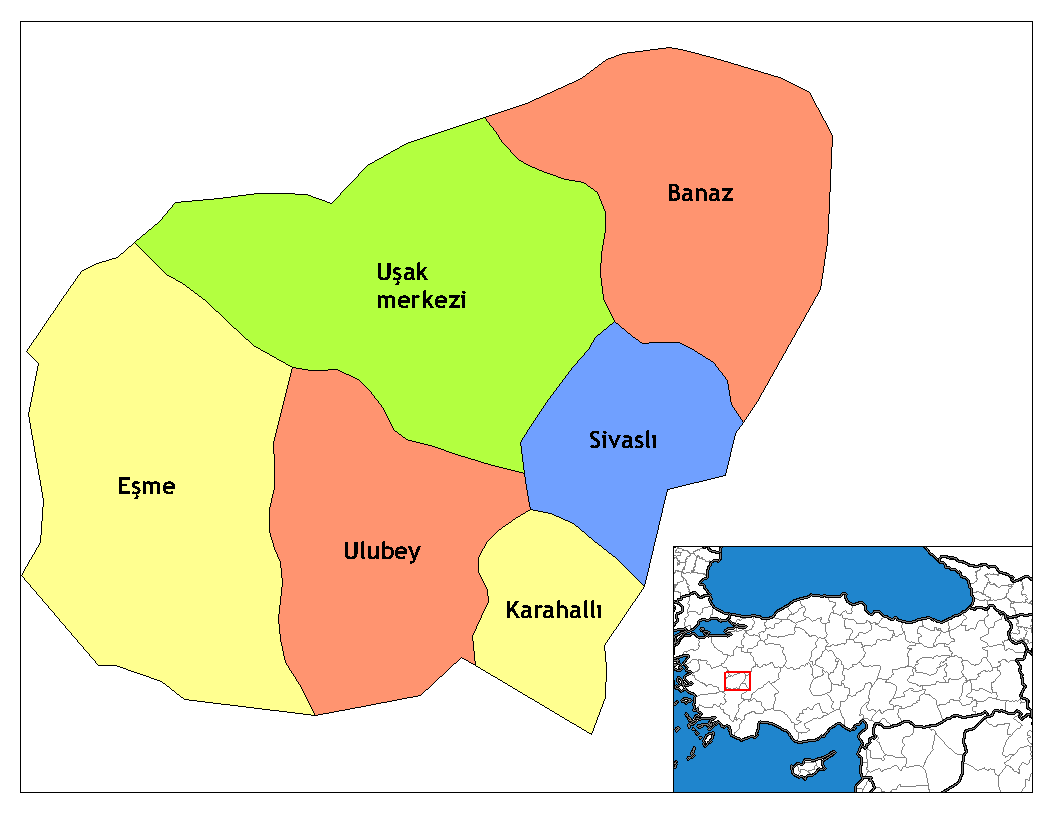
Map of the Province of Uşak, showing the provincial districts.

The Governor of Uşak (Turkish: Uşak Valiliği) is the bureaucratic state official responsible for both national government and state affairs in the Province of Uşak. Similar to the Governors of the 80 other Provinces of Turkey, the Governor of Uşak is appointed by the Government of Turkey and is responsible for the implementation of government legislation within Uşak. The Governor is also the most senior commander of both the Uşak provincial police force and the Uşak Gendarmerie.

== Appointment ==
The Governor of Uşak is appointed by the President of Turkey, who confirms the appointment after recommendation from the Turkish Government. The Ministry of the Interior first considers and puts forward possible candidates for approval by the cabinet. The Governor of Uşak is therefore not a directly elected position and instead functions as the most senior civil servant in the Province of Uşak.

=== Term limits ===
The Governor is not limited by any term limits and does not serve for a set length of time. Instead, the Governor serves at the pleasure of the Government, which can appoint or reposition the Governor whenever it sees fit. Such decisions are again made by the cabinet of Turkey. The Governor of Uşak, as a civil servant, may not have any close connections or prior experience in Uşak Province. It is not unusual for Governors to alternate between several different Provinces during their bureaucratic career.

== Functions ==
The Governor of Uşak has both bureaucratic functions and influence over local government. The main role of the Governor is to oversee the implementation of decisions by government ministries, constitutional requirements and legislation passed by Grand National Assembly within the provincial borders. The Governor also has the power to reassign, remove or appoint officials a certain number of public offices and has the right to alter the role of certain public institutions if they see fit. Governors are also the most senior public official within the Province, meaning that they preside over any public ceremonies or provincial celebrations being held due to a national holiday. As the commander of the provincial police and Gendarmerie forces, the Governor can also take decisions designed to limit civil disobedience and preserve public order. Although mayors of municipalities and councillors are elected during local elections, the Governor has the right to re-organise or to inspect the proceedings of local government despite being an unelected position.

== List of governors of Uşak ==
- Cemal Babaç (1953–1954)
- Salih Ekmel Çetiner (1954)
- Kadri Eroğan (1954–1956)
- Hıfzı Ege (1956)
- Şakir Canalp (1956–1958)
- İlhan Engin (1958–1960)
- İhsan Tekin (1960–1962)
- Musa Eran (1962–1966)
- Nusret Budunç (1966–1968)
- Nezih Okuş (1968–1970)
- Gafur Soylu (1970–1971)
- Süfyan Emiroğlu (1971–1975)
- Abidin Coşkun (1975–1978)
- Kadir Demir (1978–1979)
- Mustafa Gönül (1979–1980)
- Fikret Koçak (1980–1981)
- Refik Arslan Öztürk (1981–1984)
- Arif Atilla Osmançelebioğlu (1984–1985)
- Kamil Demircioğlu (1985–1989)
- Gökhan Sözer (1989–1992)
- Yılmaz Ergun (1992–1995)
- Kamil Demircioğlu (1995–1996)
- Kadir Uysal (1996–1999)
- Ayhan Nasuhbeyoğlu (1999–2003)
- Ali Fuat Güven (2003–2005)
- Kayhan Kavas (2005–2009)
- Özdemir Çakacak (2009–2012)
- Mehmet Ufuk Erden (2012–2014)
- Seddar Yavuz (2014–2015)
- Ahmet Okur (2015–2017)
- Salim Demir (2017–2018)
- Funda Kocabıyık (2018–2022)
- Dr. Turan Ergün (2022–2024)
- Dr. Naci Aktaş (2024–2026)
- Serdar Kartal (2026–)

== See also ==
- Governor (Turkey)
- Uşak Province
- Ministry of the Interior (Turkey)
