= Kırkyaren =

Village in Uşak Province, Turkey

Coordinates: 38°21′04″N 29°25′47″E

Kırkyaren is a village (neighborhood) in the Karahallı District of Uşak Province, Turkey. Its population is 439 (2007).

== Name ==
The name of the village means literally "forty friends" (Turkish: kırk, "forty," + yaren, "friend"). The village name has also been recorded as Kırkyaran, Kırkyılan, Kırkyalan, and Kırkyeren.

== History ==
In 1782, four villagers of Kırkyaren were reportedly robbed and held captive by villagers from a place called Emre Sultan, supposedly as part of Qizilbash or Alevi rituals.

In 1907, the village included 181 households, with a population of 905.

In 1955, the village population was 954.

== Historical sites ==
- Some Byzantine spolia can be found in the village. On Türkmendede Hill north of the village are the remains of three buildings with Byzantine spolia.
- Kırkyaren Village Big Fountain (Koca Çeşme), about 1.5 kilometers north of the village, was built in 1843 and is attached to the wall of the village laundry (çamaşırhane).
- Kırkyaren Village Lower Fountain (Aşağı Çeşme), 20 meters northwest of the Big Fountain, was built in 1867-68, but has been mostly destroyed by "treasure hunters."
