= Eşme District =

District of Uşak Province, Turkey

- District
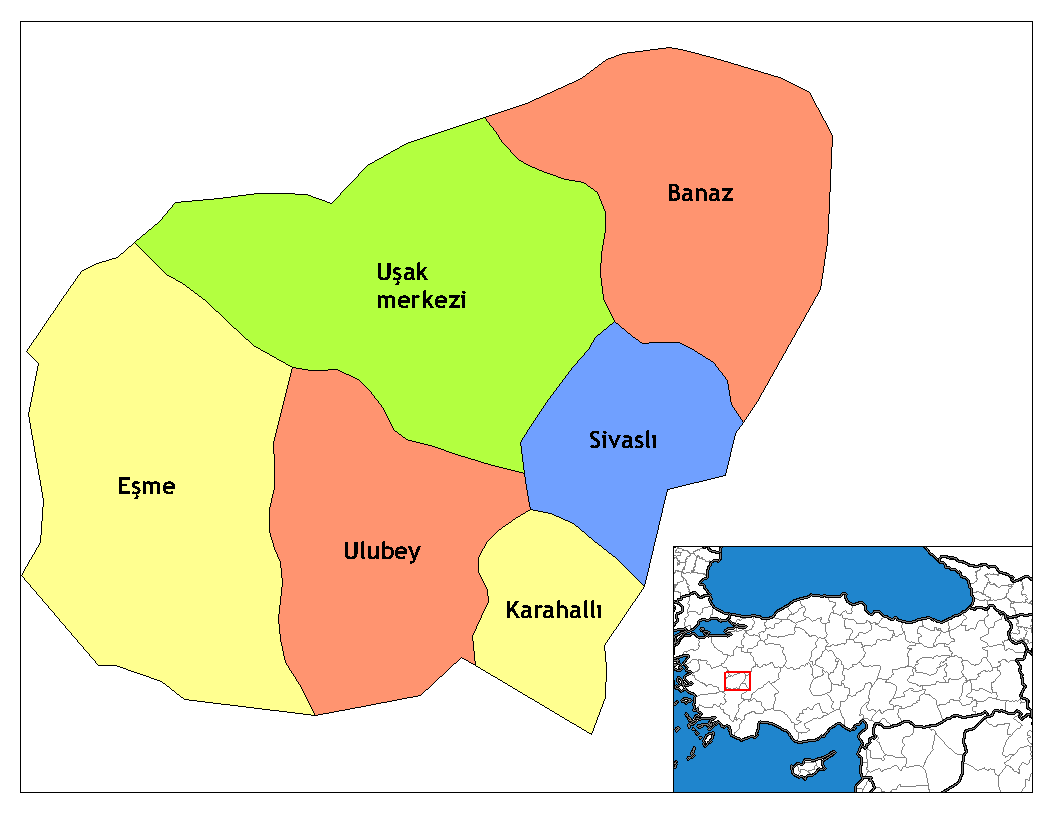
- Map showing the districts of Uşak Province

- Location in Turkey Eşme District (Turkey Aegean)
- Coordinates: 38°24′N 28°58′E
- Country: Turkey
- Province: Uşak
- Seat: Eşme

Government
  - Kaymakam: Mustafa Görmüş
- Area: 1,143.1 km^{2} (441.4 sq mi)
- Population (2022): 34,312
  - Density: 30/km^{2} (78/sq mi)
- Time zone: UTC+3 (TRT)
- Website: www.esme.gov.tr

Eşme District is a district of the Uşak Province of Turkey. Its seat is the town of Eşme. Its area is 1,156 km^{2}, and its population is 34,312 (2022).

== Composition ==
There are two municipalities in Eşme District:

- Eşme
- Yeleğen

There are 59 villages in Eşme District:

- Ağabey
- Ahmetler
- Akçaköy
- Alahabalı
- Alıçlı
- Araplar
- Armutlu
- Aydınlı
- Balabancı
- Bekişli
- Bozlar
- Caberler
- Camili
- Çaykışla
- Cemalçavuş
- Cevizli
- Davutlar
- Delibaşlı
- Dereköy
- Dereli
- Dervişli
- Emirli
- Eşmeli
- Eşmetaş
- Gökçukur
- Güllü
- Güllübağ
- Güney
- Günyaka
- Hamamdere
- Hardallı
- İsalar
- Kandemirler
- Karaahmetli
- Karabacaklı
- Karacaömerli
- Katrancılar
- Kayalı
- Kayapınar
- Kazaklar
- Keklikli
- Kıranköy
- Kocabey
- Kolankaya
- Konak
- Köseler
- Köylüoğlu
- Manavlı
- Narıncalı
- Narlı
- Oymalı
- Puslu
- Saraycık
- Şehitli
- Takmak
- Uluyayla
- Yaylaköy
- Yeniköy
- Yeşilkavak
