= Cilandiras Bridge =

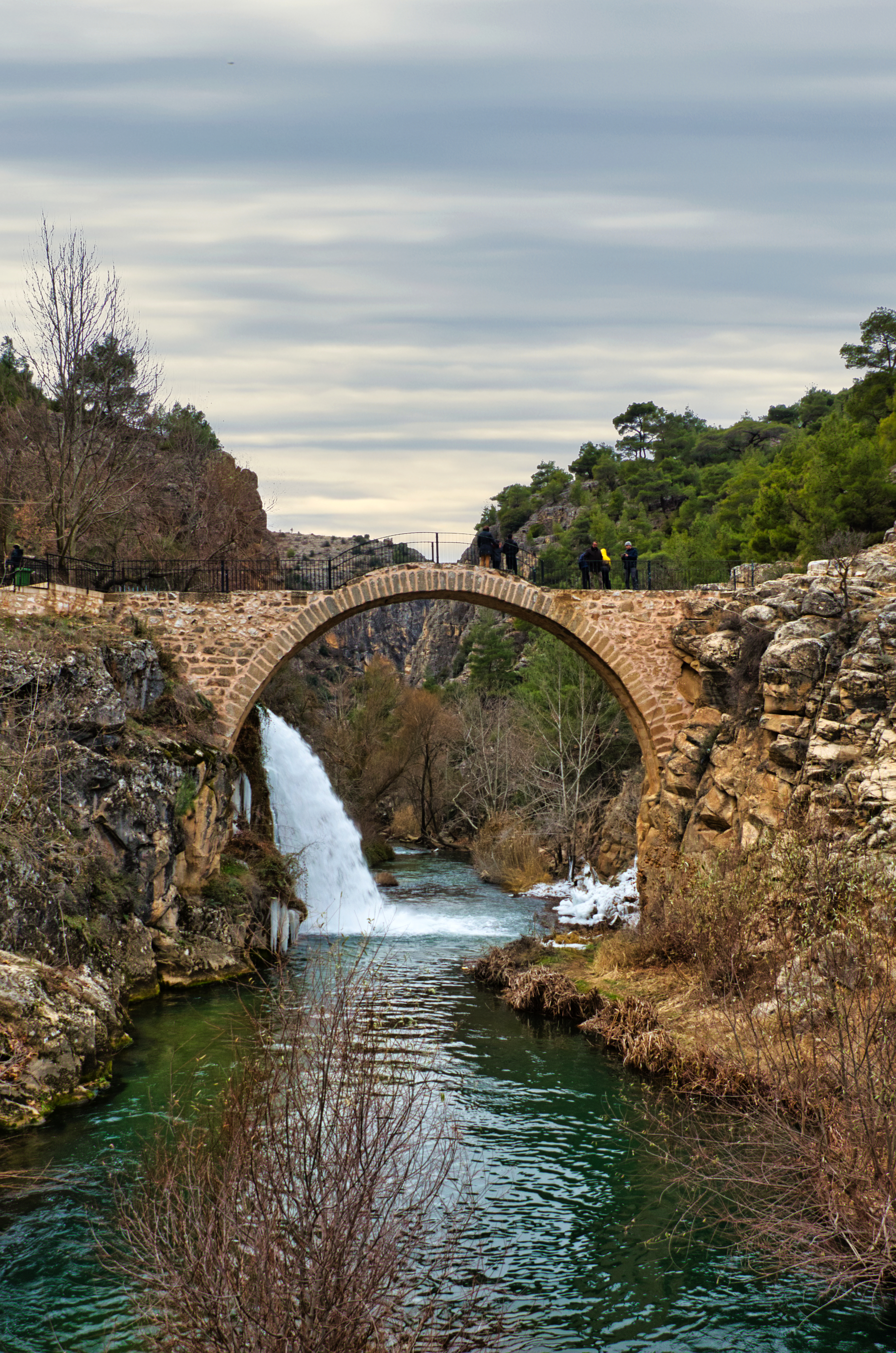
- Cilandiras Bridge
- Coordinates: 38°24′28″N 29°29′05″E
- Crosses: Banaz Creek
- Official name: Cilandiras Köprüsü

Characteristics
- Material: Stone
- Total length: 24 m (79 ft)
- Width: 1.75 m (5.7 ft)
- Height: 17 m (56 ft)
- No. of spans: 1

History
- Construction end: Phrygian

Statistics
- Daily traffic: Pedestrian

Location
- Interactive map of Cilandiras Bridge

Cilandiras Bridge (Turkish: Cilandiras Köprüsü) is an ancient bridge in Turkey.

The bridge is around Alfaklar village and to the north of Karahallı ilçe (district) of Uşak Province at 38°24′28″N 29°29′05″E. It is over Banaz Creek which is a tributary of Büyük Menderes River.

According to Uşak municipality, the one arch bridge was constructed during the Phrygian era of Anatolia. Arch structures (bridges, buildings, aqueducts ect), were introduced during the Roman period. According that widely documented knowledge, the structure of Cilandiras Bridge, was probably built during the era of the East Roman Empire (Byzantium) by Greek- speaking people of the area. Its length is 24 metres (79 ft) and width is 1.75 metres (5 ft 9 in). Its height over the river is 17 metres (56 ft). Both sides of the bridge superimpose on rock. During a maintenance, a cement portion had been added to the original structure. Currently there is a small hydroelectric plant next to the bridge. The area around the bridge and the small waterfall of the plant is a popular picnic site.
