= Mesotymolus =

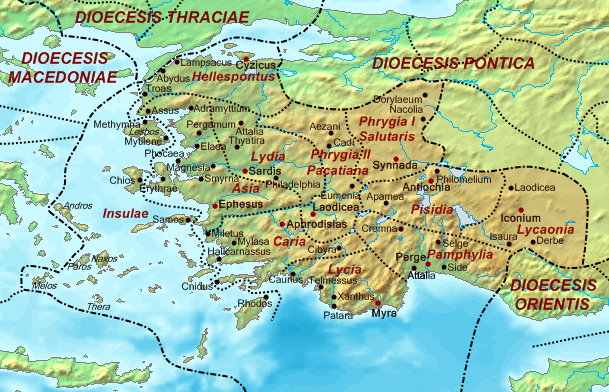
Asia Minor 400AD

Mesotymolus was an ancient Roman and Byzantine-era city on the Hermus River in ancient Lydia.

The city was the seat of an ancient bishopric which remains a vacant titular see to this day.

Traditionally, its site has been connected with ruins near Takmak, Eşme, modern scholars treat Mesotymolus as unlocated.
