= Karahallı District =

District of Uşak Province, Turkey

- District
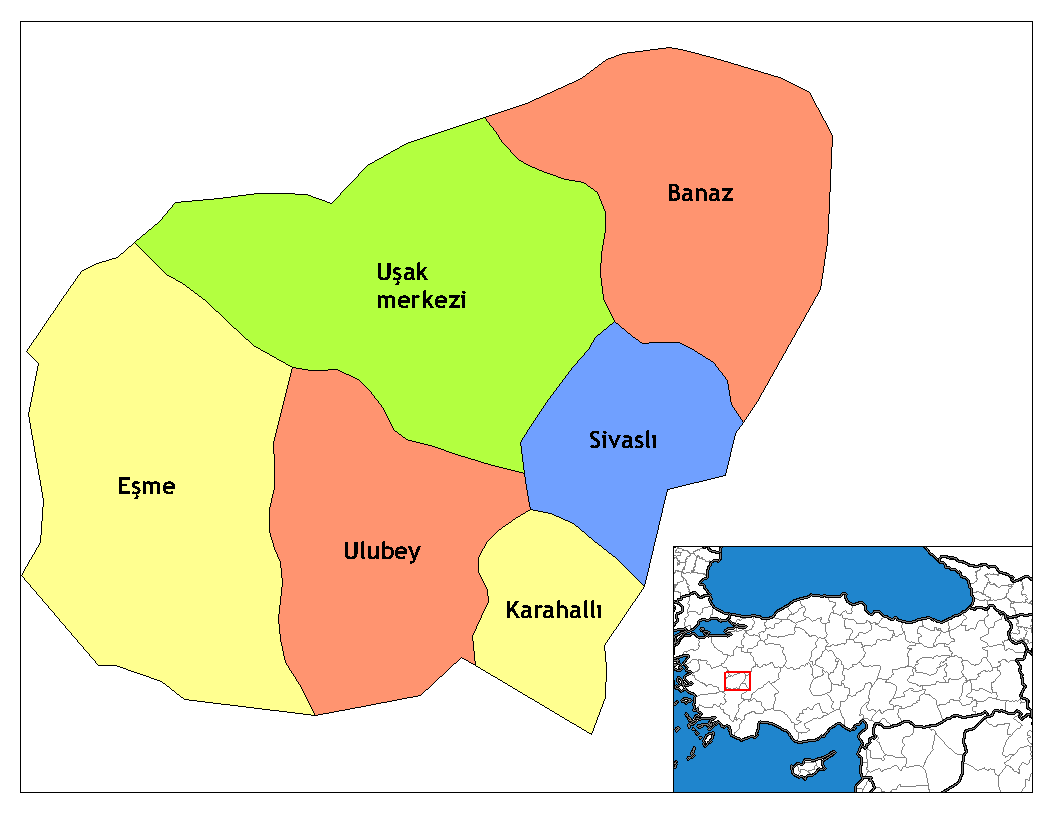
- Map showing the districts of Uşak Province

- Location in Turkey Karahallı District (Turkey Aegean)
- Coordinates: 38°19′N 29°31′E
- Country: Turkey
- Province: Uşak
- Seat: Karahallı

Government
  - Kaymakam: Melih Bulgur
- Area: 330 km^{2} (130 sq mi)
- Population (2022): 9,664
  - Density: 29/km^{2} (76/sq mi)
- Time zone: UTC+3 (TRT)
- Website: www.karahalli.gov.tr

Karahallı District is a district of the Uşak Province of Turkey. Its seat is the town of Karahallı. Its area is 330 km^{2}, and its population is 9,664 (2022). Karahallı district area neighbors those of two other districts of the same province to the north, namely Ulubey District and Sivaslı District, and to the south those of two districts depending Denizli Province which are Çivril and Bekilli. The district area is crossed by Banaz Stream and is divided roughly equally between agricultural lands and woodland, mostly oaks.

== Composition ==
There is one municipality in Karahallı District:

- Karahallı

There are 13 villages in Karahallı District:

- Alfaklar
- Beki
- Çoğuplu
- Çokaklı
- Delihıdırlı
- Dumanlı
- Duraklı
- Karayakuplu
- Kavaklı
- Kaykıllı
- Kırkyaren
- Külköy
- Paşalar
