= Blaundus =

Roman episcopal city in Asia Minor

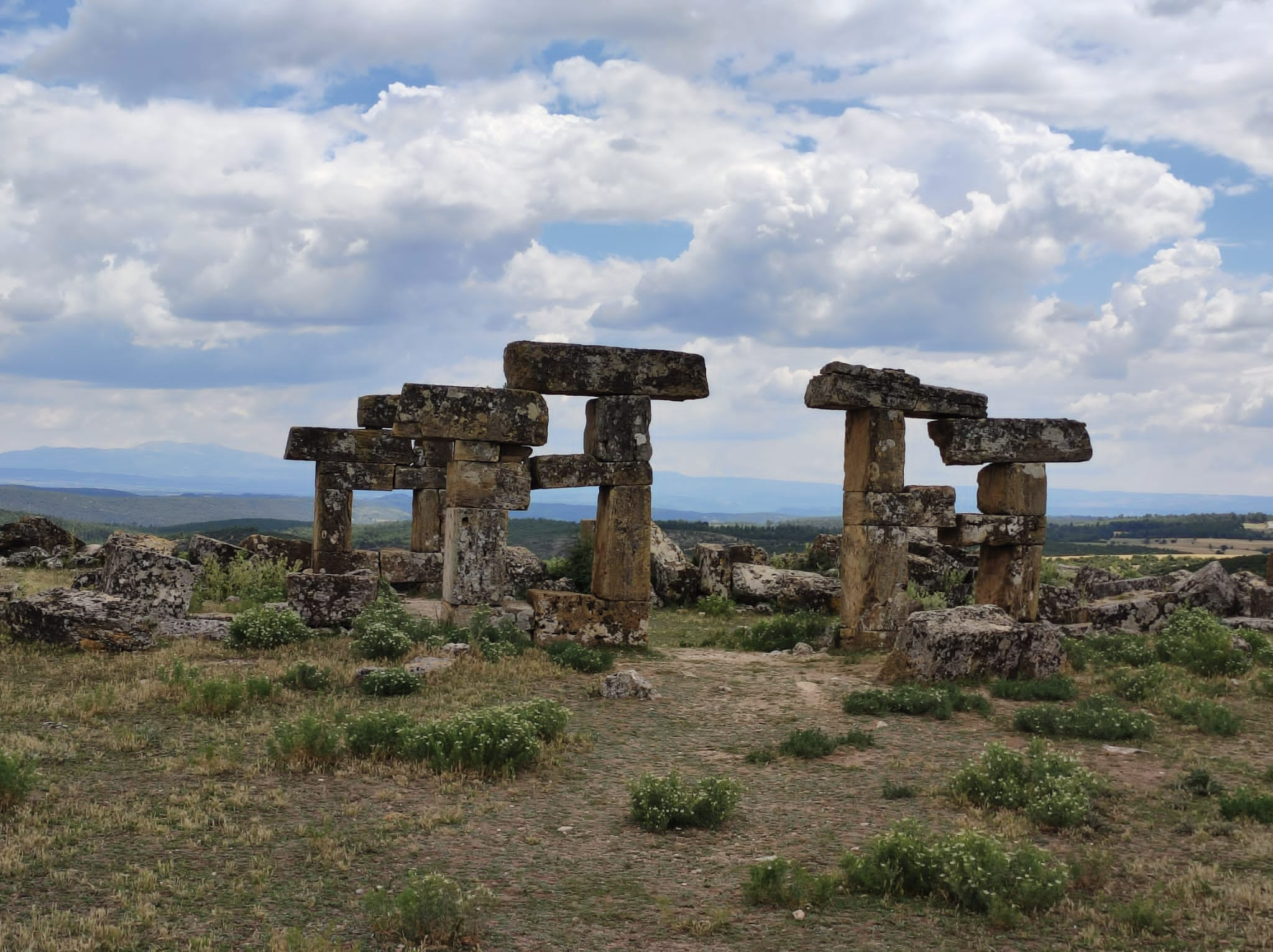
- The ruins at Baundos, Turkey

- Location within Turkey Location within Europe
- 38°21′25″N 29°12′32″E
- Type: Ancient Greek settlement
- Location: Ulubey, Uşak Province, Turkey
- Region: Lydia, Phrygia

History
- Built: 3rd century BC - 4th century BC
- Built by: Lydian and Phrygian Greeks
- Abandoned: 12th century

Blaundus (Ancient Greek: Βλαῦνδος) was a Greek city founded during the Hellenistic period in Asia Minor, presently Anatolia (Asian Turkey), and is now a Latin Catholic titular bishopric.

== History ==
The ancient city was between the regions of Lydia and Phrygia in the Seleucid Empire. Its ruins are in Sülümenli (formerly Süleimanli), near Ulubey (formerly Göbek) in the Uşak Province of modern Turkey.

Greek coins have been discovered which write the city name as Mlaundus. A Greek inscription of the Roman period though write the city as Blaundus.

Recent findings of cylinder-seals in archaeological excavation point towards the conclusion that there was a settlement already established at the beginning of the 2nd millennium BC, belonging to the Assyrian trade colony period.

In 2019, excavations in Blaundus uncovered a Roman-period bronze medallion from the nearby Lydian city of Silandus, embedded in the fill of a Byzantine-era workshop on the main street. The medallion, dated to around 163–165 CE during the co-rule of Marcus Aurelius and Lucius Verus, depicts Faustina II on the obverse and the two emperors clasping hands on the reverse, a motif symbolizing dynastic harmony. The reverse inscription names Attalianos, the local magistrate.

== Bishopric ==
In the Roman and Byzantine eras, the city was the seat of a bishopric, a suffragan of the Metropolitan Archdiocese of Sardes. The diocese was known by the names Blaundus, Blandus and Balandus. It was part of the Patriarchate of Constantinople. In the 5th century AD, the bishopric was connected to the diocese center at Sebaste.

Three bishops of Blaundus are historically attested.

- Phoebus (fl. 359), who at the Council of Seleucia in 359 distanced himself from his fellow Arians, signing the orthodox formula drafted by Acacius of Caesarea, and for this reason was deposed.
- Elijah or Helias (fl. 451) who took part in the Council of Chalcedon of 451.
- Onesiphorus (fl. 458), who signed a letter written by the bishops of Lydia to Emperor Leo in 458 following the killing of Proterius of Alexandria.

Additionally, a certain Eustathius of Alandos attended the Council of Constantinople (879-880) that rehabilitated Photius, but evidence is lacking that Alandos was the same as Balandus.

The last record of Blaundus dates from the 12th century.
