= Yeleğen =

- Municipality
- Location in Turkey Yeleğen (Turkey Aegean)
- Coordinates: 38°19′30″N 28°55′0″E
- Country: Turkey
- Province: Uşak
- District: Eşme
- Elevation: 800 m (2,600 ft)
- Population (2022): 2,039
- Time zone: UTC+3 (TRT)
- Postal code: 64610
- Area code: 0276

Yeleğen is a town (belde) in the Eşme District, Uşak Province, Turkey. It is one of the westernmost settlements of the province. The distance to Eşme is 12 kilometres (7.5 mi) and to Uşak is 65 kilometres (40 mi).

== Demographics ==
The population of the town is 2,039 (2022). Yeleğen residents are of Turkmen origin from Germiyan Beylik era in the 14th century. Çakal Turcomans live there. Avşar Turcoman are one of the 24 Oghuz Family branches and Çakal Yorukhs connect to Avşars in Turkish History.

== History ==
The original settlement was completely burned during the Greek retreat in the Turkish War of Independence (1922). The settlement was declared a seat of township in 1964.

== Economy ==
The main activity is vegetable agriculture.
