= İlyaslı =

- Village
- Location within Turkey Location within Turkey Aegean
- Coordinates: 38°36′N 29°12′E
- Country: Turkey
- Province: Uşak
- District: Uşak
- Elevation: 750 m (2,460 ft)
- Population (2022): 1,746
- Time zone: UTC+3 (TRT)
- Postal code: 64440
- Area code: 0276

İlyaslı is a village in the Uşak District of Uşak Province, Turkey. Its population is 1,746 (2022). Before the 2013 reorganisation, it was a town (belde). It is in the interior subregion of the Aegean Region. The distance to Uşak is 18 kilometres (11 mi). The settlement was probably founded in the 17th century by a certain Yörük (nomadic Turkmen) named İlyas. It is a typical Anatolian agricultural town, the main product being cereals. There is also a ceramic mine around the town. Another town revenue is from İlyaslı residents working in Germany as migrant workers.
