= Lake Sülüklü (Bolu) =

- Sülüklü Göl (Turkish)
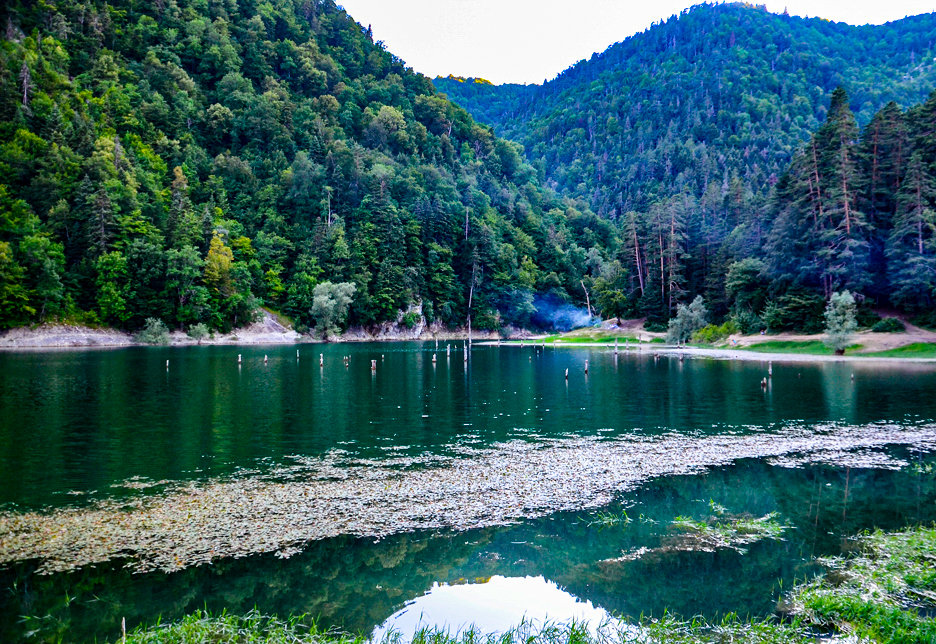
- A view from Lake Sülüklü in Bolu Province.

- Location within Turkey
- Location: Mudurnu, Bolu Province, Turkey
- Coordinates: 40°31′19″N 30°52′25″E
- Type: landslide lake

Lake Sülüklü (Turkish: Sülüklü Göl), for "Lake of the Leeches", is a freshwater landslide lake located at Tavşansuyu village of Mudurnu district in Bolu Province, Turkey. It is situated in the same-named Nature Park. It is most easily reached from the village of Dokurcun in Akyazı district of Sakarya Province.
