= Lake Sülüklü (Elazığ) =

Small lake in Ağın, Elazığ, Turkey

Coordinates: 38°55′39″N 38°35′33″E

Lake Sülüklü (Turkish: Sülüklü Göl), for "Lake of the Leeches", is a freshwater lake located at Balkayası village of Ağın district in Elazığ Province, Turkey.
