= Pınarbaşı, Sivaslı =

Pınarbaşı
- Municipality
- Location in Turkey Pınarbaşı (Turkey Aegean)
- Coordinates: 38°28′47″N 29°41′07″E
- Country: Turkey
- Province: Uşak
- District: Sivaslı
- Population (2022): 1,953
- Time zone: UTC+3 (TRT)

Pınarbaşı is a town (belde) in the Sivaslı District, Uşak Province, Turkey. Its population is 1,953 (2022).
