= Lake Sülüklü (Gaziantep) =

Freshwater lake in Turkey

Coordinates: 37°18′17″N 37°15′18″E

Lake Sülüklü (Turkish: Sülüklü Göl), for "Lake of the Leeches", is a freshwater lake located at Şehitkamil district in Gaziantep Province, Turkey.
