= Sebaste (Phrygia) =

Ancient city in Phrygia

Coordinates: 38°29′43″N 29°39′29″E

Sebaste (Ancient Greek: Σεβαστή) was a town of Phrygia Pacatiana in ancient Phrygia, inhabited in Roman and Byzantine times. It was located between Alydda and Eumenia. It became the seat of a Christian bishop, mentioned by Hierocles, and in the Acts of the Council of Constantinople, which its bishop attended. No longer a residential bishopric, it remains, under the name Sebaste in Phrygia, a titular see of the Roman Catholic Church.

Its site is located near Selçikler in Asiatic Turkey.
