= Tatar, Sivaslı =

Tatar
- Municipality
- Location in Turkey Tatar (Turkey Aegean)
- Coordinates: 38°27′44″N 29°39′01″E
- Country: Turkey
- Province: Uşak
- District: Sivaslı
- Population (2022): 1,876
- Time zone: UTC+3 (TRT)

Tatar is a town (belde) in the Sivaslı District, Uşak Province, Turkey. Its population is 1,876 (2022).
