= Sivaslı =

- Municipality
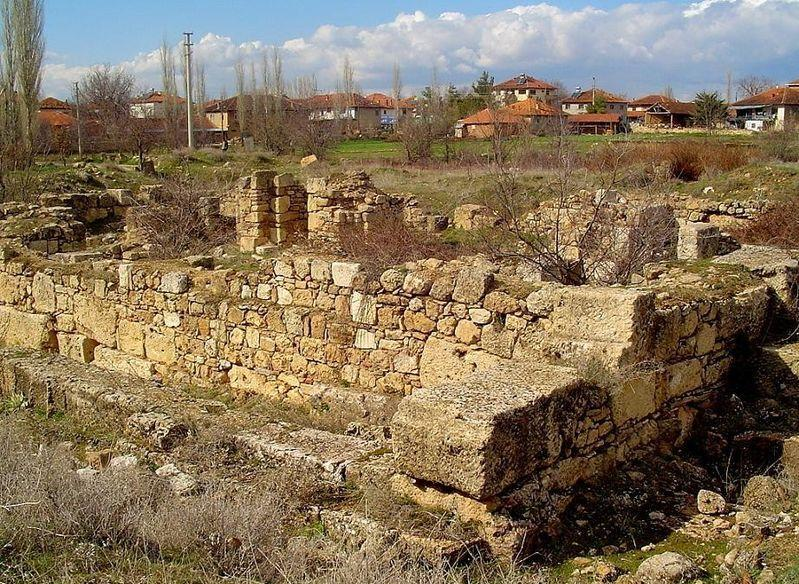
- Ruins of the ancient city of Sebaste near Sivaslı

- Location within Turkey Location within Turkey Aegean
- Coordinates: 38°29′55″N 29°40′53″E
- Country: Turkey
- Province: Uşak
- District: Sivaslı

Government
  - Mayor: Bahri Azatçam (AKP)
- Elevation: 950 m (3,120 ft)
- Population (2022): 7,082
- Time zone: UTC+3 (TRT)
- Postal code: 64800
- Area code: 0276
- Website: www.sivasli.bel.tr

Sivaslı, formerly known as Sebaste (Greek: Σεβαστή) is a town in Uşak Province in the inner Aegean region of Turkey. It is the seat of Sivaslı District. Its population is 7,082 (2022). Sebaste ancient city area is 2 km (1.2 mi) away from Sivaslı town center today.

The ancient city of Sebaste was founded by Roman Emperor Augustus in 20 AD, and was one of the 12 important cities of Roman Phrygia. Under the Byzantine Empire, the city turned into a regional bishop seat. There are remains of Byzantine buildings from the 6th and 10th century, including two large basilicas.
