= Eşme =

- Municipality
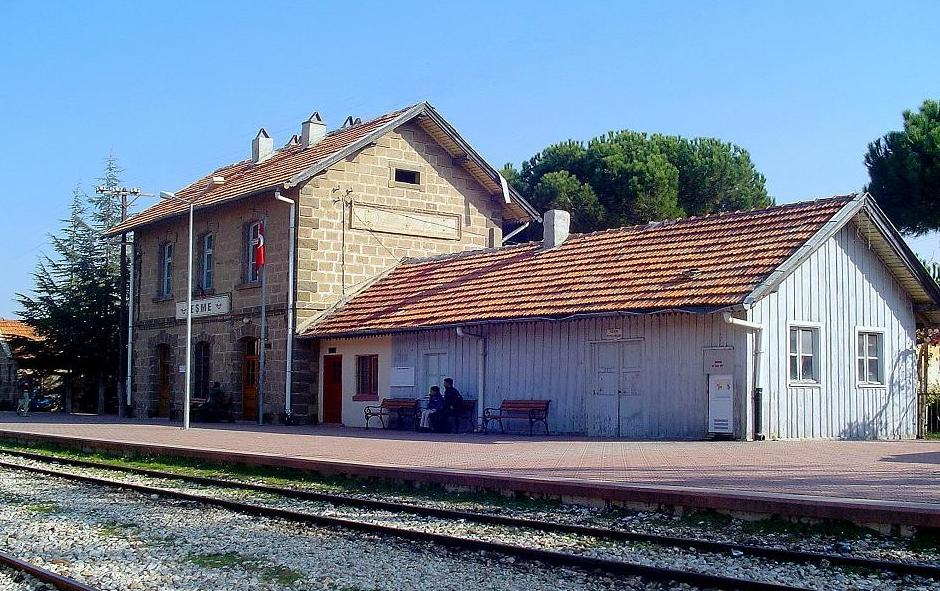
- Eşme train station

- Location within Turkey Location within Turkey Aegean
- Coordinates: 38°24′N 28°58′E
- Country: Turkey
- Province: Uşak
- District: Eşme

Government
  - Mayor: Yılmaz Tozan (CHP)
- Elevation: 823 m (2,700 ft)
- Population (2022): 15,762
- Time zone: UTC+3 (TRT)
- Postal code: 64800
- Area code: 0276
- Climate: Csa
- Website: www.esme.bel.tr

Eşme is a town in Uşak Province in the inner Aegean Region of Turkey. It is the seat of Eşme District. Its population is 15,762 (2022). The principal economic activities include tobacco farming, stockbreeding, kilim weaving and trading.

== History ==
The 2nd century BC is the period when Eşme took its place on the stage of history. During the Hellenistic ages, many civilizations, from the Phrygians to the Cimmerians, from the Lydians to the Romans, reigned in these lands. Immigrants of Thracian origin named "Maion" left their mark on the history scene by giving the name "Maionia" to the region.

Before the Ottoman period, Eşme came under the rule of the Seljuk State. Eşme was included in the Ottoman Empire during the reign of Yıldırım Bayezid. From 1867 to 1922, Eşme was part of the Aidin Vilayet of the Ottoman Empire.
