= Uşak District =

District of Uşak Province, Turkey

- District
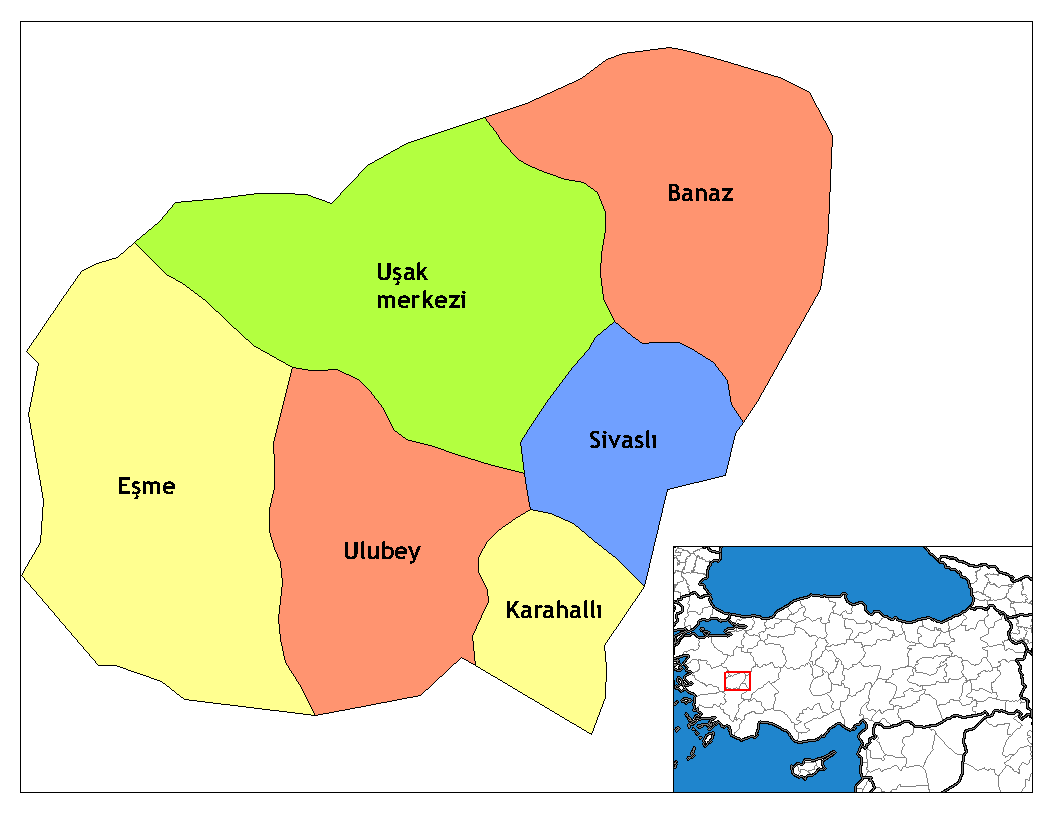
- Map showing the districts of Uşak Province

- Location in Turkey Uşak District (Turkey Aegean)
- Coordinates: 38°41′N 29°24′E
- Country: Turkey
- Province: Uşak
- Seat: Uşak
- Area: 1,655 km^{2} (639 sq mi)
- Population (2022): 264,540
  - Density: 159.8/km^{2} (414.0/sq mi)
- Time zone: UTC+3 (TRT)

Uşak District (also: Merkez, meaning 'central' in Turkish) is a district of the Uşak Province of Turkey. Its seat is the city of Uşak. Its area is 1,655 km^{2}, and its population is 264,540 (2022).

== Composition ==
There is one municipality in Uşak District:

- Uşak

There are 83 villages in Uşak District:

- Akbulak
- Aktaş
- Altıntaş
- Bağbaşı
- Belkaya
- Beylerhanı
- Bölme
- Boyalı
- Bozköy
- Bozkuş
- Buğdaylı
- Çalıkhasan
- Çamyazı
- Çamyuva
- Çarık
- Çatalbayır
- Ciğerdede
- Çınarcık
- Çukurağıl
- Dağdemirler
- Dağyenice
- Demirören
- Derbent
- Dışkaya
- Eğlence
- Elmacık
- Emirfakılı
- Eskigüney
- Eskisaray
- Eynehan
- Fakılı
- Göğem
- Gökçedal
- Gökçetepe
- Gücer
- Güneli
- Güre
- Halilefendi Çiftliğiköyü
- Hisar
- Hocalar
- İlyaslı
- Kabaklar
- Kapancık
- Karabeyli
- Karacahisar
- Karahasan
- Karaköse
- Karlık
- Kayaağıl
- Kediyünü
- Kılcan
- Kırka
- Kısık
- Köprübaşı
- Koyunbeyli
- Mende
- Mesudiye
- Mollamusa
- Örencik
- Ormandamı
- Ortabağ
- Ortaköy
- Paçacılar
- Sarıdere
- Selikler
- Selviler
- Selvioğlu
- Sirge
- Sorkun
- Şükraniye
- Susuzören
- Taşkonak
- Üçkuyular
- Ulucak
- Ürün
- Yapağılar
- Yaşamışlar
- Yavi
- Yeniköy
- Yenişehir
- Yeşildere
- Yoncalı
- Zahman
