= Sivaslı District =

District of Uşak Province, Turkey

- District
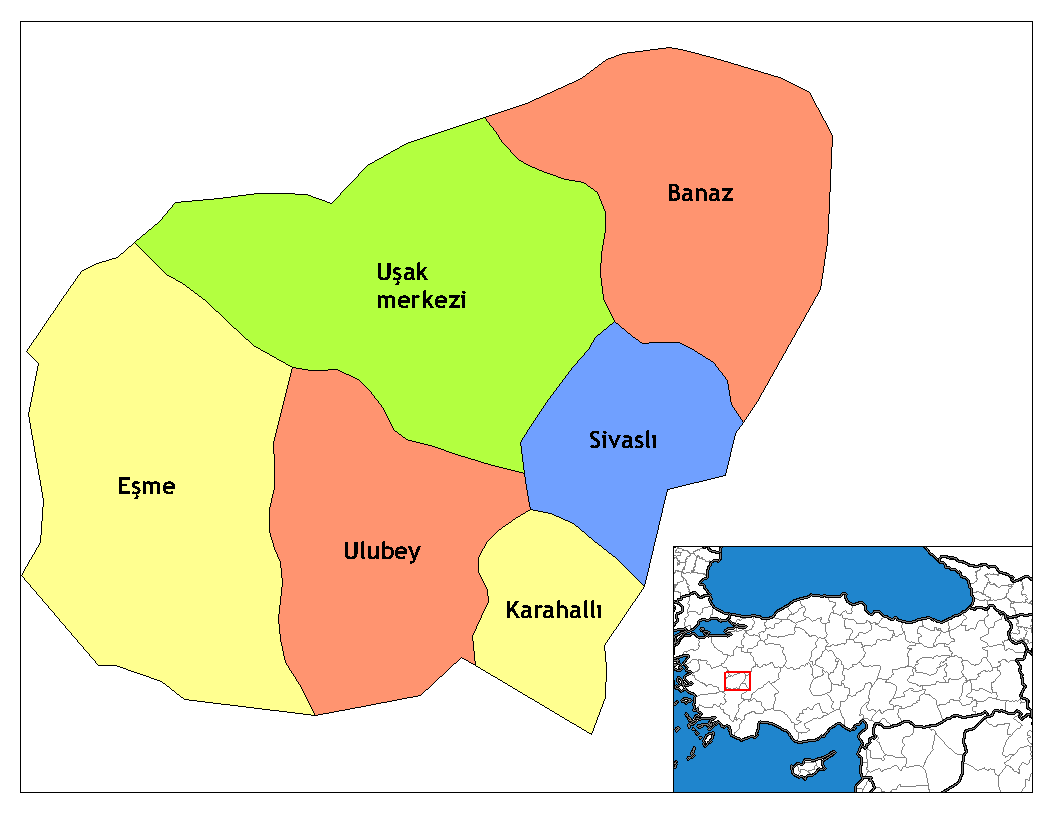
- Map showing the districts of Uşak Province

- Location in Turkey Sivaslı District (Turkey Aegean)
- Coordinates: 38°30′N 29°41′E
- Country: Turkey
- Province: Uşak
- Seat: Sivaslı

Government
  - Kaymakam: Funda Hamza Çaldağı
- Area: 473 km^{2} (183 sq mi)
- Population (2022): 19,733
  - Density: 42/km^{2} (110/sq mi)
- Time zone: UTC+3 (TRT)
- Website: www.sivasli.gov.tr

Sivaslı District is a district of the Uşak Province of Turkey. Its seat is the town of Sivaslı. Its area is 473 km^{2}, and its population is 19,733 (2022).

== Composition ==
There are four municipalities in Sivaslı District:

- Pınarbaşı
- Selçikler
- Sivaslı
- Tatar

There are 18 villages in Sivaslı District:

- Ağaçbeyli
- Akarca
- Azizler
- Budaklar
- Cinoğlu
- Eldeniz
- Erice
- Hacim
- Hanoğlu
- Karaboyalık
- Ketenlik
- Kökez
- Özbeyli
- Salmanlar
- Samatlar
- Sazak
- Yayalar
- Yenierice
