= Karahallı =

- Municipality
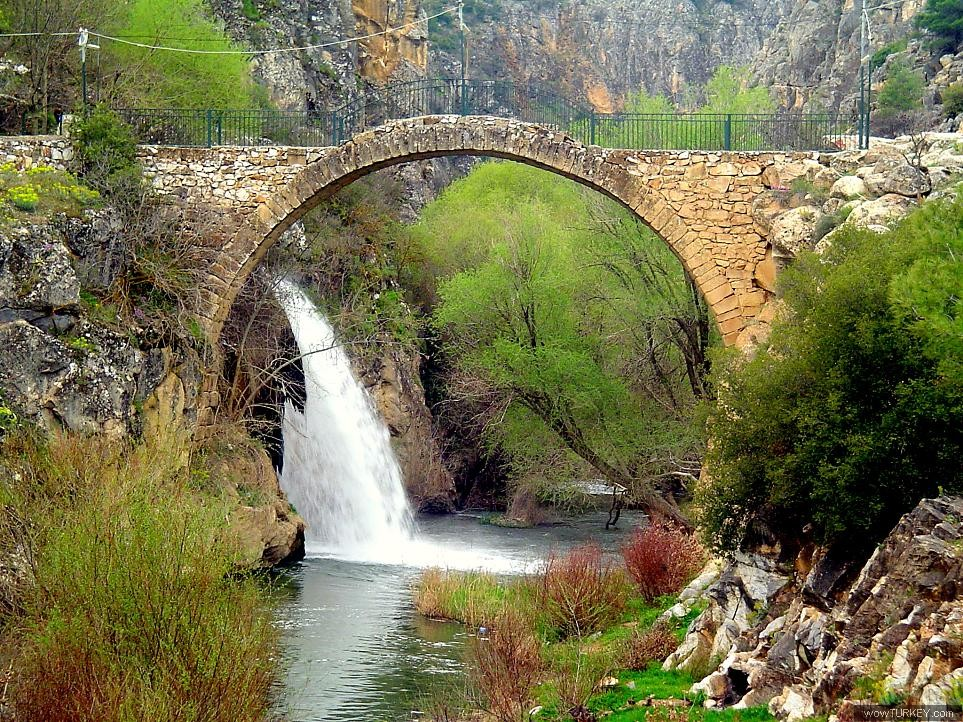
- Ancient Cilandiras Bridge over Banaz Stream near Karahallı

- Location within Turkey Location within Turkey Aegean
- Coordinates: 38°19′N 29°31′E
- Country: Turkey
- Province: Uşak
- District: Karahallı

Government
  - Mayor: Ramazan Karakaya (CHP)
- Elevation: 873 m (2,864 ft)
- Population (2022): 5,672
- Time zone: UTC+3 (TRT)
- Postal code: 64700
- Area code: 0276

Karahallı is a town in Uşak Province in the inner Aegean region of Turkey. It is the seat of Karahallı District. Its population is 5,672 (2022). Karahallı is at a distance of 62 km (39 mi) from the province center of Uşak lying to its north.

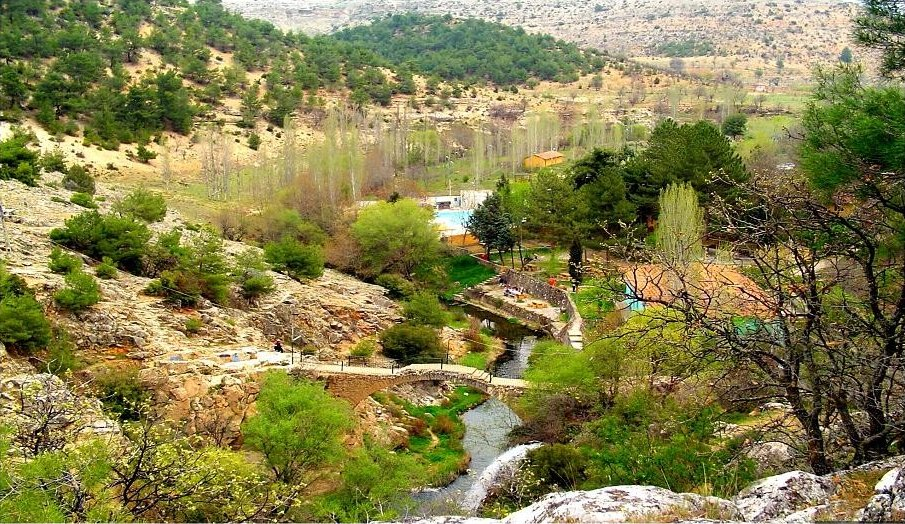
Aerial view of Cilandiras Bridge

The name of the town makes reference to its founder, the 14th century Turkmen bey Kara Halil. The township was made into a district in 1953, simultaneous to the separation of Uşak Province from Kütahya Province, and Uşak's becoming a province seat.

There is a recently built dam and its reservoir, which is arranged into a recreational area that stands out notably by the presence of an ancient bridge, possibly associated with the Lydians and the Persians, and the Royal Road, although research specific to the bridge is yet to be made. It is built over Banaz Stream (Banaz Çayı) which later joins Büyük Menderes River and the locality is called Clandras or Klandras.

The ancient site of Pepuza, proclaimed as new Jerusalem in the traditions of Montanism, sometimes referred to as the lost sect of Christianity (mid-2nd century) is located within the boundaries of Karahallı district, and is an important visitor's attraction.

Another important ancient construction is Cılandıras Bridge over Banaz Stream.

In Ottoman times, the township was an important center for textile products, made especially of wool woven following Turkish traditions. Weaving activity is still pursued in an intensive manner with the presence of more than a thousand electric power looms across the district.

Cultivation of grapes intended for production of wine in the nearby center of Bekilli is also an important economic activity.

The region of Karahallı experienced considerable levels of outside immigration in recent decades, both towards other centers of its region and towards Europe. People who originate in Karahallı and live outside the district now outnumber those living in Karahallı.

Among notable natives is Azra Akın, Miss World in 2002, herself born in the Netherlands, but whose father, the former Eskişehirspor player Nazmi Akın, is from Karahallı.

== See also ==
- Pepuza
