= Banaz =

- Municipality
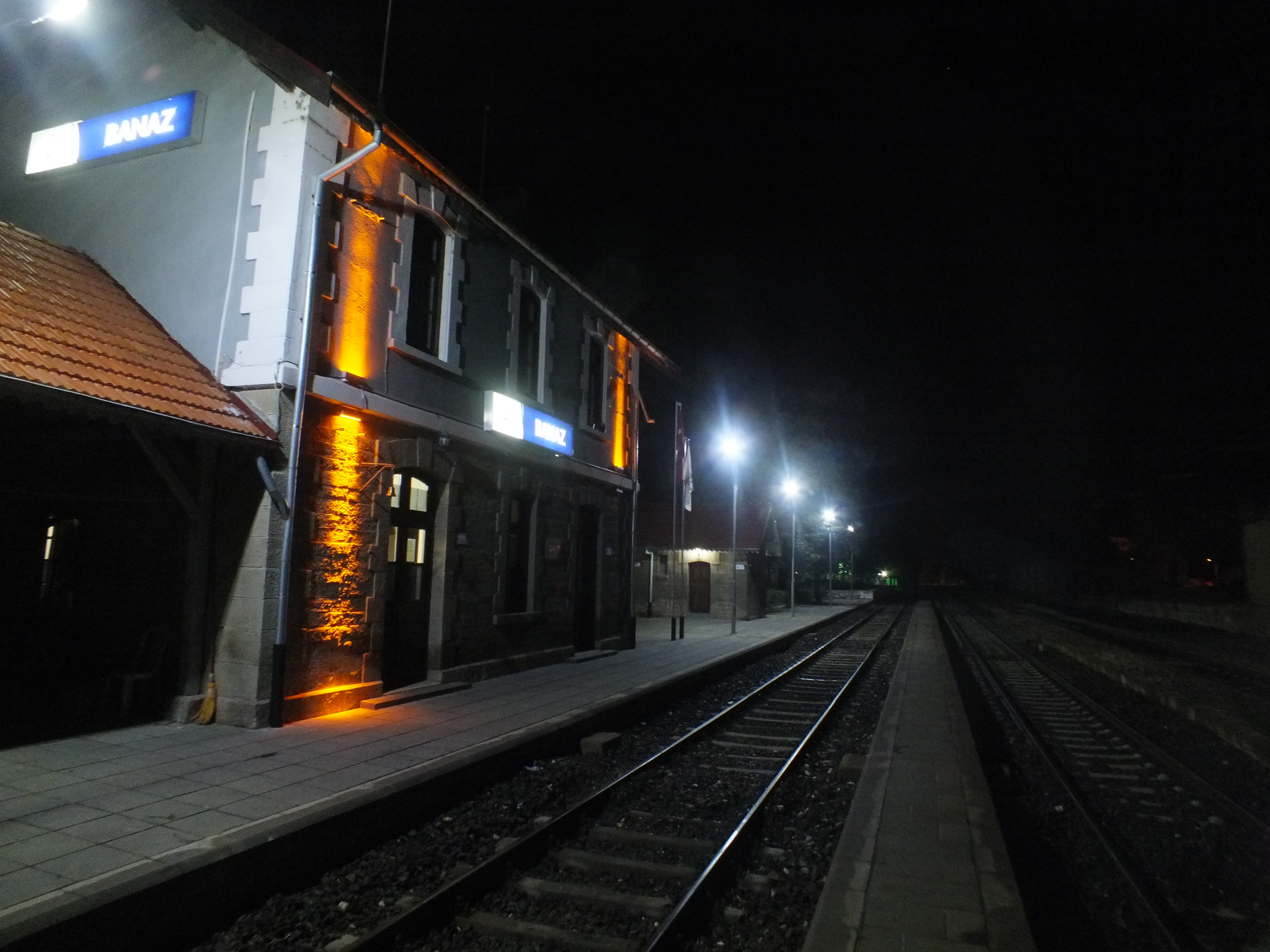
- Banaz railway station

- Location within Turkey Location within Turkey Aegean
- Coordinates: 38°44′N 29°45′E
- Country: Turkey
- Province: Uşak
- District: Banaz

Government
  - Mayor: Zafer Arpacı (AKP)
- Elevation: 914 m (2,999 ft)
- Population (2022): 16,807
- Time zone: UTC+3 (TRT)
- Postal code: 64500
- Area code: 0276
- Website: www.banaz.bel.tr

Banaz is a town in Uşak Province in the inner Aegean region of Turkey. It is the seat of Banaz District. Its population is 16,807 (2022). The mayor is Zafer Arpacı (AKP). The town is situated on the main road from İzmir to Ankara, at a distance of 33 km (21 mi) to the province seat of Uşak.

There is a village in Banaz District that carries the same name of "Banaz", lying at a distance of 4 km from the town. This is where the ancient site of the locality, called Panasion and from which the name Banaz derives, was actually located.
