= Ulubey, Uşak =

Ulubey
- Municipality
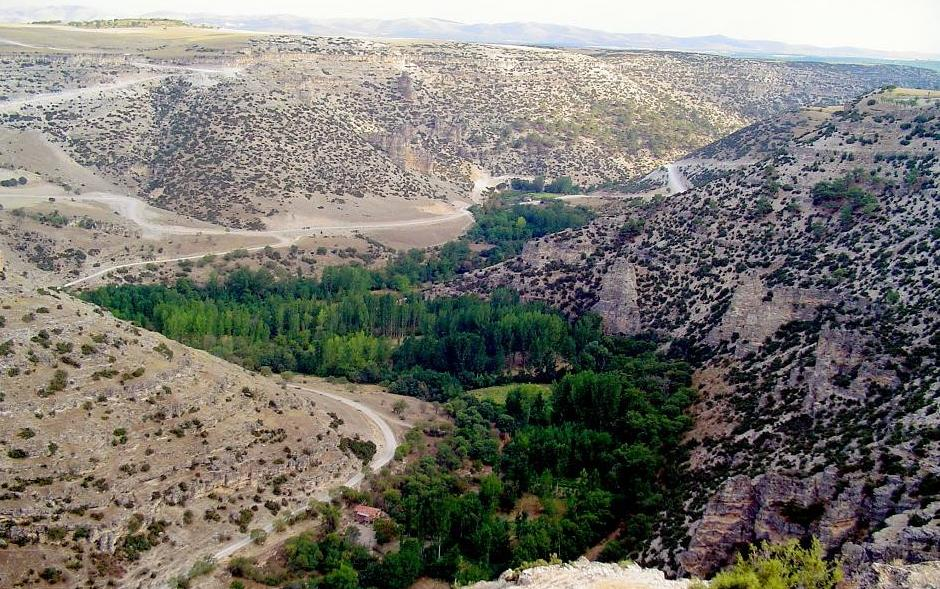
- Ulubey Canyon

- Location within Turkey Location within Turkey Aegean
- Coordinates: 38°25′N 29°17′E
- Country: Turkey
- Province: Uşak
- District: Ulubey

Government
  - Mayor: Veli Koçlu (AKP)
- Elevation: 737 m (2,418 ft)
- Population (2022): 6,195
- Time zone: UTC+3 (TRT)
- Postal code: 64900
- Area code: 0276
- Website: www.usakulubey.bel.tr

Ulubey, formerly Göbek, is a town in Uşak Province in the inner Aegean Region of Turkey. It is the seat of Ulubey District. Its population is 6,195 (2022).
