= Uşak =

- Municipality

- Logo

- Location within Turkey Location within Turkey Aegean
- Coordinates: 38°40′40″N 29°24′15″E
- Country: Turkey
- Province: Uşak
- District: Uşak

Government
  - Mayor: Özkan Yalım (CHP)
- Elevation: 906 m (2,972 ft)
- Population (2022): 236,366
- Time zone: UTC+3 (TRT)
- Postal code: 64000
- Area code: 0276
- Website: www.usak.bel.tr

Uşak (Turkish pronunciation: [ˈuʃak]) is a city in the interior part of the Aegean Region of Turkey. It is the seat of Uşak Province and Uşak District. Its population is 236,366 (2022). It is the ancient Temenothyra(e).

Uşak is located 210 km (130 mi) from İzmir, the region's principal metropolitan center and port city. Benefiting from its location at the crossroads of the Central Anatolian plateau and the coastal Aegean Region, and from a climate and agricultural production incorporating elements of both of these zones, Uşak has also traditionally had a strong industrial base. Uşak was the first city in Turkey to have an urban electricity network, and the first city where a collective labor relations agreement was signed, during the Ottoman era, between leather industry employees and workers. It was here that the first factory of Republican Turkey, a sugar refinery, was set up through a private sector initiative among local businessmen. The tradition of industriousness continues today around two industrial zones.

== Name ==
The earliest known name of Uşak is Temenothyrae. Under the Roman Empire, it was named Flaviopolis, for the Flavian dynasty. It has been called Uşak 'servant' since 1490. From 1855 until 1922, Uşak was part of Hüdavendigâr vilayet.

== History ==
The first known organized states in the region were the Phrygians in the eastern portion and the Lydians in the west, during the seventh century BC. The Karun Treasure, discovered by clandestine treasure hunters in Uşak in 1965, and whose smuggling outside Turkey and subsequent retrieval decades later from New York City's Metropolitan Museum of Art made international headlines, gives an indication of the high degree of civilization attained by these Anatolian states. The region of Lydia was conquered by the Persian Empire in the 6th century BC and may have been a station on the Persian Royal Road. It was taken by Alexander the Great in the 4th century and ruled by his successors. Uşak was then ruled by the Roman Empire, the Byzantine Empire, the Seljuks, the Germiyanids and finally the Ottomans (1429).

During the Greco-Turkish War, Uşak was occupied by the Greek Army from 28 August 1920 to 1 September 1922. During the Greek retreat, the Greek general Nikolaos Trikoupis was captured near Uşak at the village of Göğem, today buried under a dam reservoir.

Uşak was a district center within Kütahya Province until 1953, when Uşak Province was constituted and Uşak became its provincial capital.

== Economic history ==
At least since the 17th century there was trade between Uşak and the Dutch republic as reflected in the rug shown thrown over the bannister in Vermeer's painting "The Procuress." The rug was probably produced in Uşak, covers a third of the painting and shows medallions and leaves.

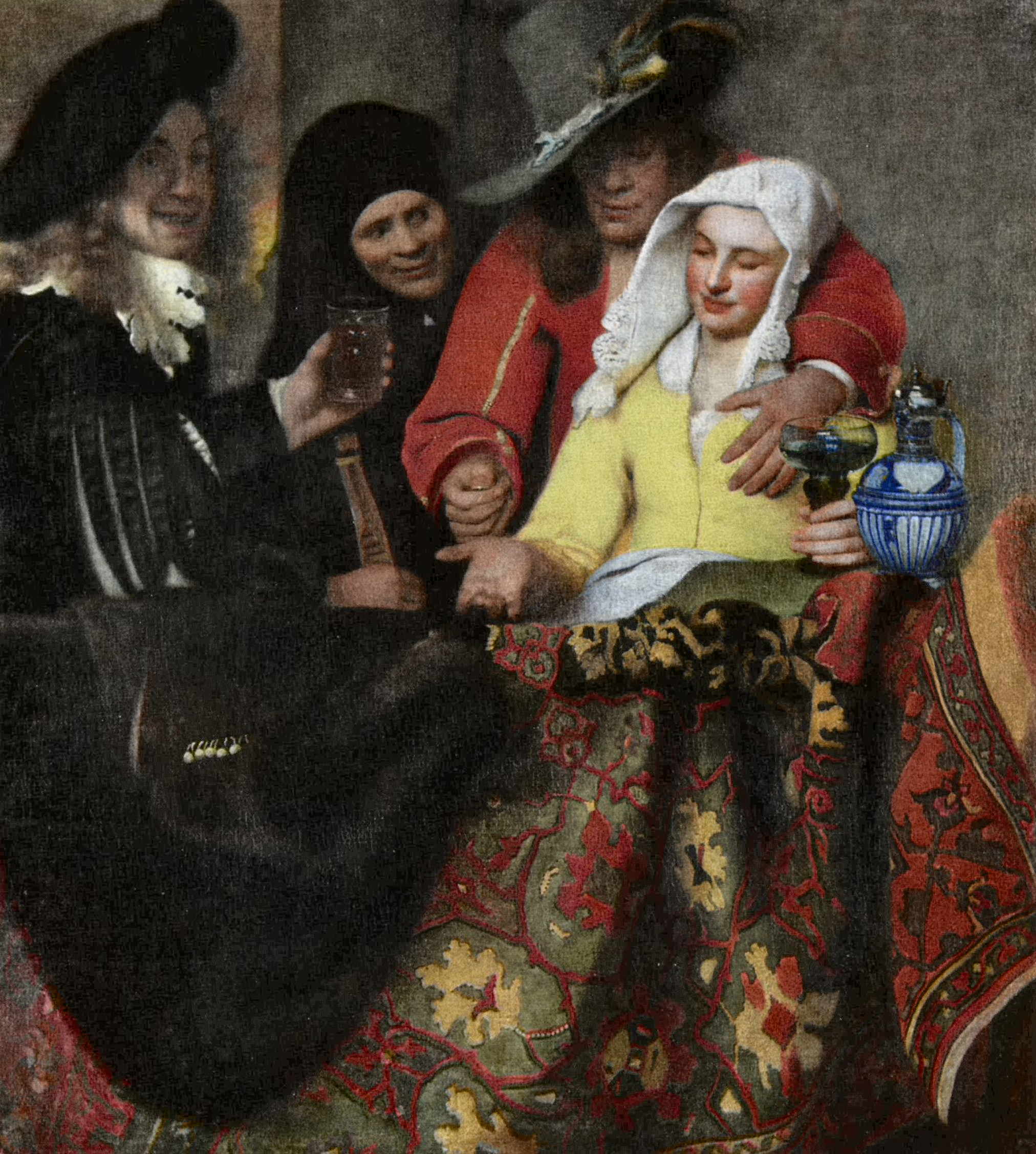
The kelim rug shown in Vermeer's 1656 painting The Procuress was identified as probably originating in Uşak, testifying to 17th Century trade linking the city with the Dutch Republic.

In the early 20th century, mercury was discovered in Uşak. The town also manufactured carpet.

Among other district centers in Uşak Province, Banaz is the largest and is notable for its varied agricultural production as well as for its forests, while Ulubey's canyon is a natural site attracting many visitors.

== Geography ==
The city of Uşak consists of 29 neighbourhoods, including Kurşunluk and Muharremşah.

=== Climate ===
Uşak has a Mediterranean (Köppen: Csa) or an oceanic climate (Trewartha: Doak), with cool, wet, regularly snowy winters and hot, dry summers.

Highest recorded temperature:41.9 °C (107.4 °F) on 18 August 2023
Lowest recorded temperature:−19.9 °C (−3.8 °F) on 5 January 1942

Climate data for Uşak (1991–2020, extremes 1939–2023)
Month	Jan	Feb	Mar	Apr	May	Jun	Jul	Aug	Sep	Oct	Nov	Dec	Year
Record high °C (°F)	18.3 (64.9)	23.6 (74.5)	27.0 (80.6)	30.0 (86.0)	34.5 (94.1)	36.6 (97.9)	40.2 (104.4)	41.9 (107.4)	36.6 (97.9)	32.6 (90.7)	26.6 (79.9)	21.8 (71.2)	41.9 (107.4)
Mean daily maximum °C (°F)	7.3 (45.1)	8.9 (48.0)	12.5 (54.5)	17.0 (62.6)	22.5 (72.5)	27.3 (81.1)	31.2 (88.2)	31.5 (88.7)	26.8 (80.2)	20.9 (69.6)	14.6 (58.3)	9.2 (48.6)	19.1 (66.4)
Daily mean °C (°F)	2.6 (36.7)	3.7 (38.7)	6.7 (44.1)	11.0 (51.8)	15.9 (60.6)	20.4 (68.7)	24.0 (75.2)	24.2 (75.6)	19.5 (67.1)	14.2 (57.6)	8.4 (47.1)	4.3 (39.7)	12.9 (55.2)
Mean daily minimum °C (°F)	−1.1 (30.0)	−0.3 (31.5)	1.8 (35.2)	5.4 (41.7)	9.6 (49.3)	13.2 (55.8)	16.3 (61.3)	16.6 (61.9)	12.5 (54.5)	8.5 (47.3)	3.8 (38.8)	0.7 (33.3)	7.3 (45.1)
Record low °C (°F)	−19.9 (−3.8)	−15.0 (5.0)	−12.5 (9.5)	−6.2 (20.8)	−1.0 (30.2)	2.9 (37.2)	7.4 (45.3)	6.8 (44.2)	2.0 (35.6)	−4.8 (23.4)	−11.8 (10.8)	−18.9 (−2.0)	−19.9 (−3.8)
Average precipitation mm (inches)	64.3 (2.53)	65.2 (2.57)	55.9 (2.20)	65.6 (2.58)	48.7 (1.92)	27.5 (1.08)	17.7 (0.70)	12.4 (0.49)	20.7 (0.81)	50.2 (1.98)	59.0 (2.32)	77.3 (3.04)	564.5 (22.22)
Average precipitation days	9.03	9.3	8.8	9.2	8.07	4.27	2.57	2.07	3.4	5.93	6.13	10.1	78.9
Average snowy days	6.07	6.47	3.13	0.27	0	0	0	0	0	0.07	0.87	3.07	19.95
Average relative humidity (%)	74.1	70.6	66.3	62.9	60.5	55.3	47.8	47.6	52.5	62.0	67.5	75.1	61.8
Mean monthly sunshine hours	111.6	107.4	145.7	177.0	232.5	282.0	297.6	282.1	243.0	189.1	120.0	99.2	2,287.2
Mean daily sunshine hours	3.6	3.8	4.7	5.9	7.5	9.4	9.6	9.1	8.1	6.1	4.0	3.2	6.3
Source 1: Turkish State Meteorological Service
Source 2: NOAA (humidity), Meteomanz(snow days 2000-2014)

== Uşak carpets ==
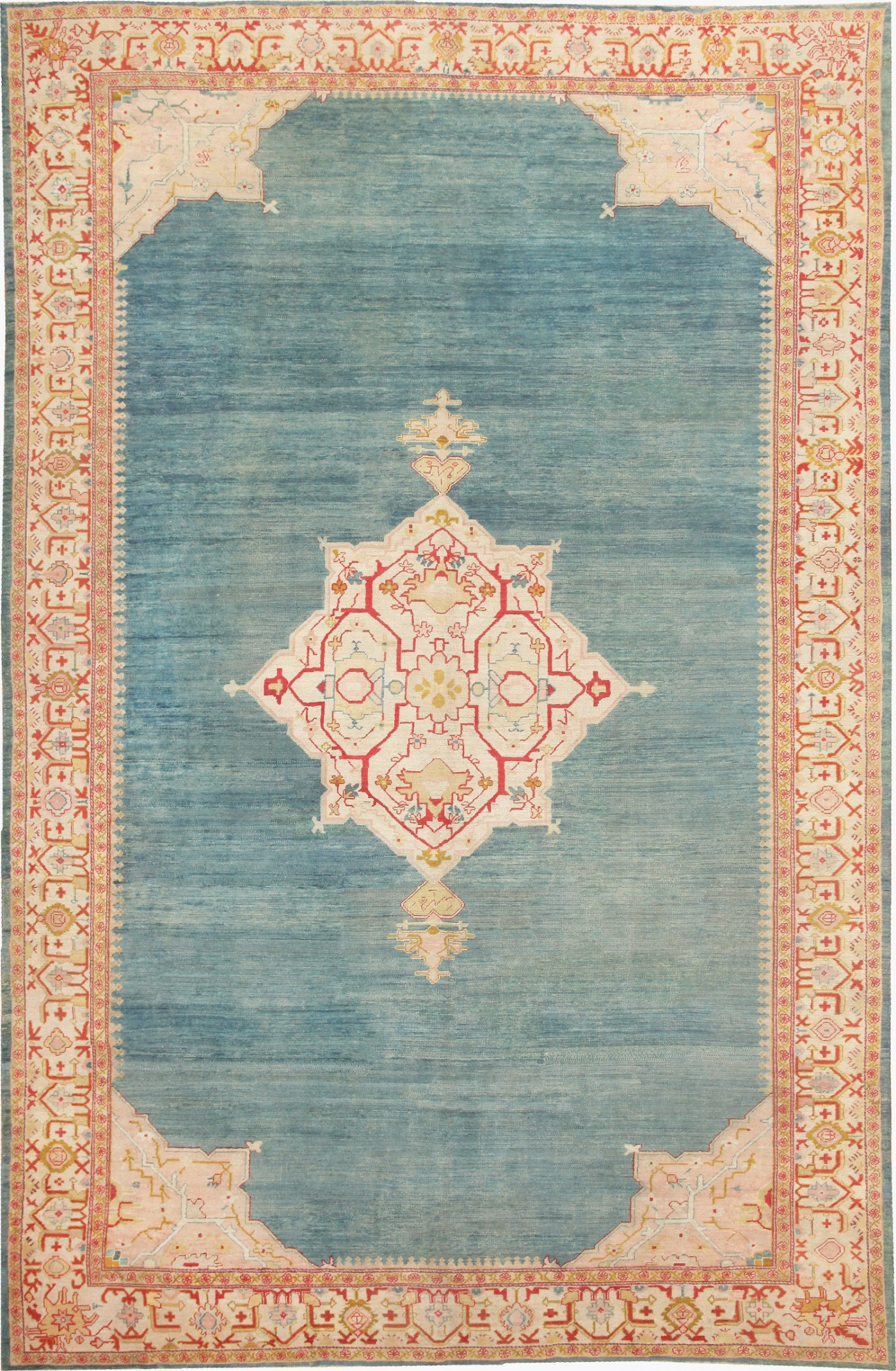
Strongly outlined palmettes and delicate botanical decorations adorn the central medallion of this exceptional Oushak.

In pre-industrial times, Uşak was already a major center of production and export, particularly of Ushak carpets. Ushak carpets are also called Holbein carpets in reference to the 16th century painter Hans Holbein the Younger who depicted them in minute detail in his paintings, reflecting their popularity in European markets. The level of international popularity attained by Uşak's carpets became such that the word "Ushak" is considered an English word of Turkic origin.

Although Uşak's carpet patterns have evolved since then, large-scale weaving still continues and the name of the city still has an important presence in the market for carpets, both hand-woven and industrial. On the other hand, the district of Eşme, which is also in Uşak Province, is famous for its kilims.

== Twin cities ==
- Offenbach - Germany
- Astana - Kazakhstan
- Besni - Turkey
- Charleroi - Belgium

== See also ==
- Ushak carpet
- Karun Treasure
- Uşak Museum of Archaeology
