= Uşak Province =

Province of Turkey

Coordinates: 38°31′26″N 29°20′31″E

Uşak Province Uşak ili
- Province
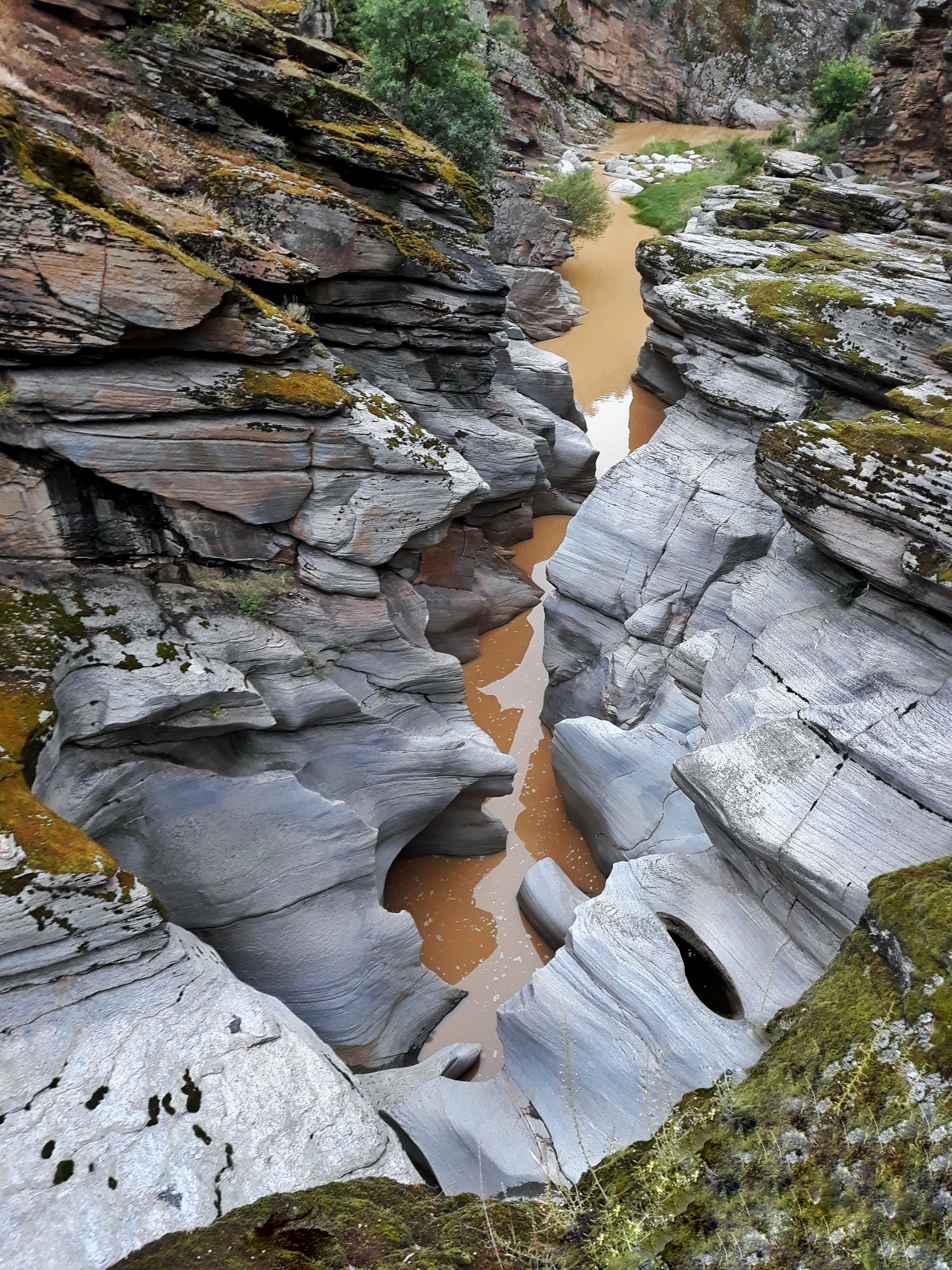
- Taşyaran Valley

- Location of the province within Turkey
- Country: Turkey
- Seat: Uşak

Government
  - Governor: Serdar Kartal
- Area: 5,555 km^{2} (2,145 sq mi)
- Population (2026): 390,000
  - Density: 70/km^{2} (180/sq mi)
- Time zone: UTC+3 (TRT)
- Area code: 0276
- Website: www.usak.gov.tr

Uşak (Turkish: Uşak ili) is a province in western Turkey. Its adjacent provinces are Manisa to the west, Denizli to the south, Afyon to the east, and Kütahya to the north. The provincial capital is Uşak, and its licence location code is 64. Its area is 5,555 km^{2}, and its population is 390,000 (2026).

In August 2018, the province decided to stop running digital advertisement on United States based social media platforms like Facebook, Google, Instagram, Twitter and YouTube canceling all of the budget as a response to the U.S. sanctions on Turkey. The U.S. sanctions were over the detention of the Pastor Andrew Brunson.

== Districts ==
Districts of the Uşak Province

Uşak province is divided into 6 districts (capital district in bold):

- Banaz
- Eşme
- Karahallı
- Sivaslı
- Ulubey
- **Uşak**

== Gallery ==
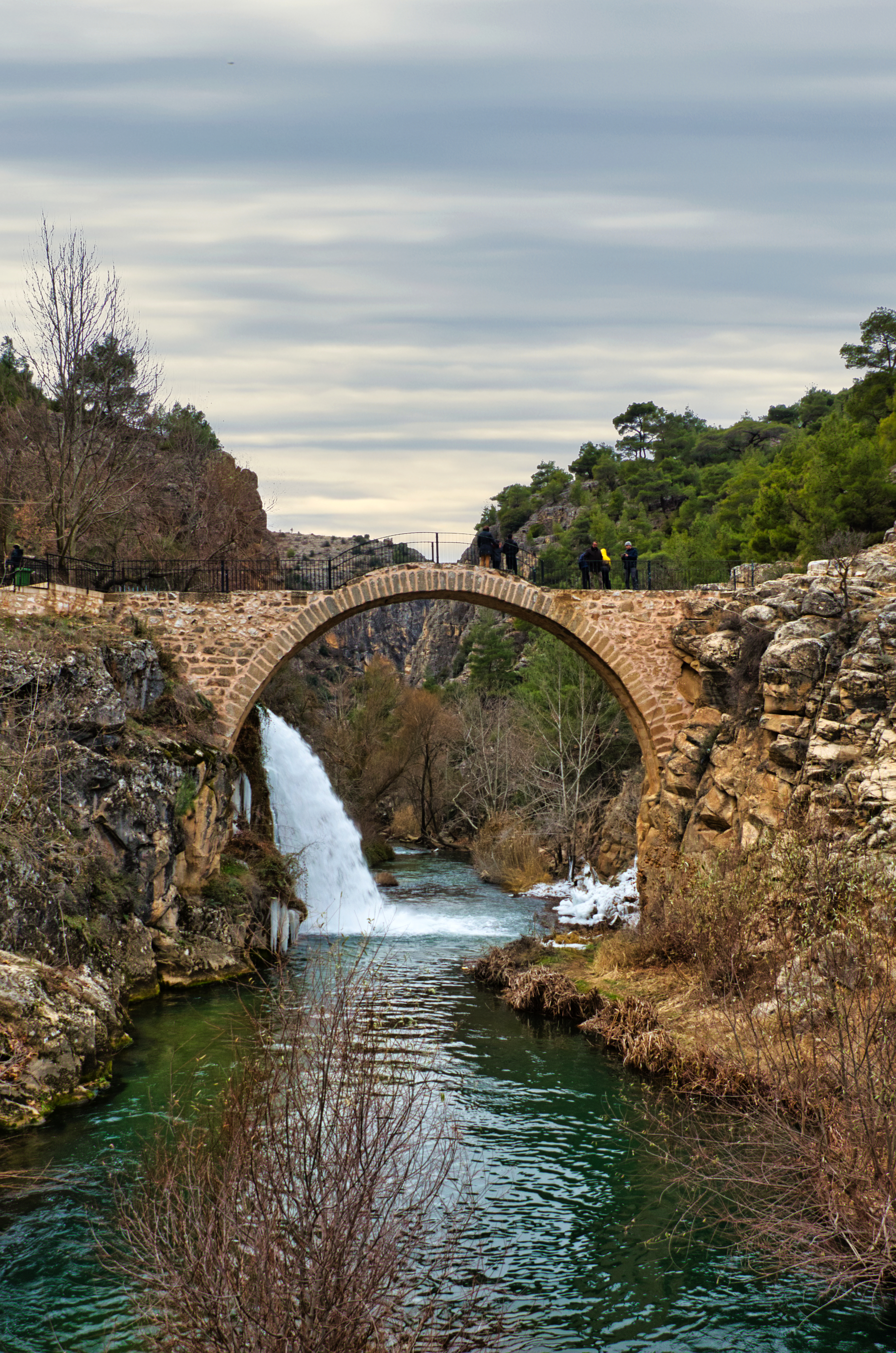
Ancient Phrygian Cilandiras bridge near Karahallı
