= List of populated places in Eskişehir Province =

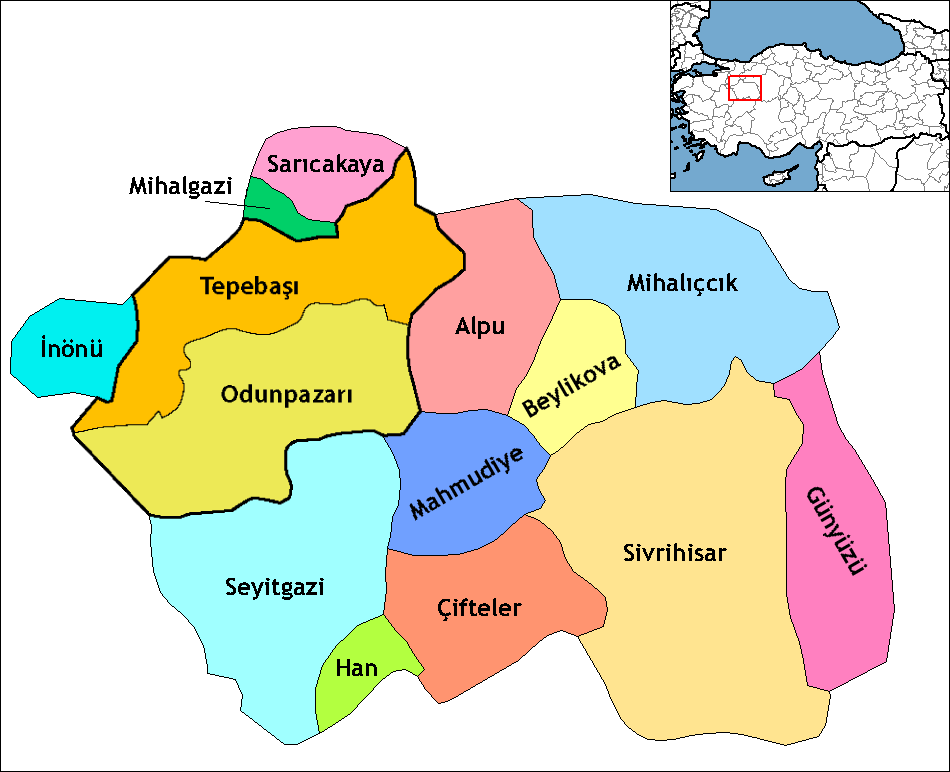
Eskişehir Province

Below is a list of the populated places in Eskişehir Province, Turkey by district. The first two districts, Odunpazarı and Tepebaşı, are parts of Greater Eskişehir. The first place in each list is the administrative center of the district.

== Odunpazarı ==
- Odunpazarı
- Akçakaya, Odunpazarı
- Akkaya, Odunpazarı
- Akpınar, Odunpazarı
- Aşağıılıca, Odunpazarı
- Avdan, Odunpazarı
- Ayvacık, Odunpazarı
- Çamlıca, Odunpazarı
- Demirli, Odunpazarı
- Doğankaya, Odunpazarı
- Eşenkara, Odunpazarı
- Gülpınar, Odunpazarı
- Gümele, Odunpazarı
- Harmandalı, Odunpazarı
- İmişehir, Odunpazarı
- Kanlıpınar, Odunpazarı
- Karaalan, Odunpazarı
- Karacaşehir, Odunpazarı
- Karaçay, Odunpazarı
- Karamustafa, Odunpazarı
- Karapazar, Odunpazarı
- Karatepe, Odunpazarı
- Kargın, Odunpazarı
- Kayacık, Odunpazarı
- Kıravdan, Odunpazarı
- Kireç, Odunpazarı
- Kuyucak, Odunpazarı
- Lütfiye, Odunpazarı
- Musalar, Odunpazarı
- Sarısungur, Odunpazarı
- Seklice, Odunpazarı
- Sultandere, Odunpazarı
- Süpüren, Odunpazarı
- Türkmentokat, Odunpazarı
- Uluçayır, Odunpazarı
- Yahnikapan, Odunpazarı
- Yenisofça, Odunpazarı
- Yürükkaracaören, Odunpazarı
- Yürükkırka, Odunpazarı
- Yukarıçağlan, Odunpazarı
- Yukarıılıca, Odunpazarı
- Yukarıkalabak, Odunpazarı

== Tepebaşı ==
- Tepebaşı
- Ahılar, Tepebaşı
- Aşağıkartal, Tepebaşı
- Atalan, Tepebaşı
- Atalantekke, Tepebaşı
- Avlamış, Tepebaşı
- Behçetiye, Tepebaşı
- Bektaşpınarı, Tepebaşı
- Beyazaltın, Tepebaşı
- Bozdağ, Tepebaşı
- Buldukpınar, Tepebaşı
- Cumhuriyet, Tepebaşı
- Çalkara, Tepebaşı
- Çanakkıran, Tepebaşı
- Danişment, Tepebaşı
- Gökçekısık, Tepebaşı
- Gündüzler, Tepebaşı
- Hekimdağ, Tepebaşı
- Karaçobanpınarı, Tepebaşı
- Karadere, Tepebaşı
- Karagözler, Tepebaşı
- Karahüyük, Tepebaşı
- Kızılcaören, Tepebaşı
- Kızılinler, Tepebaşı
- Kozlubel, Tepebaşı
- Mollaoğlu, Tepebaşı
- Musaözü, Tepebaşı
- Nemli, Tepebaşı
- Sulukaraağaç, Tepebaşı
- Takmak, Tepebaşı
- Tandır, Tepebaşı
- Taycılar, Tepebaşı
- Tekeciler, Tepebaşı
- Turgutlar, Tepebaşı
- Uludere, Tepebaşı
- Yakakayı, Tepebaşı
- Yarımca, Tepebaşı
- Yeniakçayır, Tepebaşı
- Yeniincesu, Tepebaşı
- Yukarıkartal, Tepebaşı
- Yusuflar, Tepebaşı
- Yürükakçayır, Tepebaşı

== Alpu ==
- Alpu
- Ağaçhisar, Alpu
- Aktepe, Alpu
- Alapınar, Alpu
- Arıkaya, Alpu
- Bahçecik, Alpu
- Başören, Alpu
- Belkese, Alpu
- Bozan, Alpu
- Büğdüz, Alpu
- Çardakbaşı, Alpu
- Çukurhisar, Alpu
- Dereköy, Alpu
- Esence, Alpu
- Fevziye, Alpu
- Gökçekaya, Alpu
- Gökçeoğlu, Alpu
- Güneli, Alpu
- Güroluk, Alpu
- Işıkören, Alpu
- Karacaören, Alpu
- Karakamış, Alpu
- Osmaniye, Alpu
- Özdenk, Alpu
- Sakarıkaracaören, Alpu
- Sarıkavak, Alpu
- Söğütçük, Alpu
- Uyuzhamamköyü, Alpu
- Yayıklı, Alpu
- Yeşildon, Alpu

== Beylikova ==
- Beylikova
- Akgüney, Beylikova
- Akköprü, Beylikova
- Aşağıdudaş, Beylikova
- Aşağıiğdeağacı, Beylikova
- Doğanoğlu, Beylikova
- Doğray, Beylikova
- Emircik, Beylikova
- Gökçeayva, Beylikova
- Halilbağı, Beylikova
- İkipınar, Beylikova
- İmikler, Beylikova
- Kızılcaören, Beylikova
- Okçu, Beylikova
- Parsıbey, Beylikova
- Sultaniye, Beylikova
- Süleymaniye, Beylikova
- Uzunburun, Beylikova
- Yalınlı, Beylikova
- Yeniyurt, Beylikova
- Yukarıdudaş, Beylikova
- Yukarıiğdeağacı, Beylikova

== Çifteler ==
- Çifteler
- Abbashalimpaşa, Çifteler
- Arslanlı, Çifteler
- Başkurt, Çifteler
- Belpınar, Çifteler
- Çatmapınar, Çifteler
- Dikilikaya, Çifteler
- Dikmen, Çifteler
- Doğanay, Çifteler
- Eminekin, Çifteler
- Hayriye, Çifteler
- Ilıcabaşı, Çifteler
- Kadıkuyusu, Çifteler
- Körhasan, Çifteler
- Orhaniye, Çifteler
- Ortaköy, Çifteler
- Osmaniye, Çifteler
- Sadıroğlu, Çifteler
- Saithalimpaşa, Çifteler
- Sarıkavak, Çifteler
- Yenidoğan, Çifteler
- Yıldızören, Çifteler
- Zaferhamit, Çifteler

== Günyüzü ==
- Günyüzü
- Atlas, Günyüzü
- Ayvalı, Günyüzü
- Bedil, Günyüzü
- Beyyayla, Günyüzü
- Çakmak, Günyüzü
- Çardaközü, Günyüzü
- Doğray, Günyüzü
- Tutlu, Günyüzü
- Gecek, Günyüzü
- Gümüşkonak, Günyüzü
- Kavacık, Günyüzü
- Kavuncu, Günyüzü
- Kayakent, Günyüzü
- Kuzören, Günyüzü
- Yazır, Günyüzü
- Yeşilyaka, Günyüzü

== Han ==
- Han
- Ağlarca, Han
- Akdere, Han
- Akhisar, Han
- Başara, Han
- Gökçekuyu, Han
- Gökçeyayla, Han
- Hankaraağaç, Han
- İskankuyu, Han
- Kayı, Han
- Peçene, Han
- Yazılı, Han

== İnönü ==
- İnönü
- Aşağıkuzfındık, İnönü
- Dereyalak, İnönü
- Dutluca, İnönü
- Erenköy, İnönü
- Esnemez, İnönü
- Kümbet, İnönü
- Kümbetakpınar, İnönü
- Kümbetyeniköy, İnönü
- Oklubalı, İnönü
- Seyitaliköyü, İnönü
- Yukarıkuzfındık, İnönü
- Yürükyayla, İnönü

== Mahmudiye ==
- Mahmudiye
- Akyurt, Mahmudiye
- Balçıkhisar, Mahmudiye
- Doğanca, Mahmudiye
- Fahriye, Mahmudiye
- Güllüce, Mahmudiye
- Hamidiye, Mahmudiye
- İsmetpaşa, Mahmudiye
- Kaymazyayla, Mahmudiye
- Mesudiye, Mahmudiye
- Şerefiye, Mahmudiye
- Tokathan, Mahmudiye
- Topkaya, Mahmudiye
- Türkmenmecidiye, Mahmudiye
- Yeniköy, Mahmudiye
- Yeşilyurt, Mahmudiye

== Mihalgazi ==
- Mihalgazi
- Alpagut, Mihalgazi
- Bozaniç, Mihalgazi
- Demirciler, Mihalgazi
- Karaoğlan, Mihalgazi
- Sakarıılıca, Mihalgazi

== Mihalıççık ==
- Mihalıççık
- Adahisar, Mihalıcçık
- Ahur, Mihalıcçık
- Ahurözü, Mihalıcçık
- Akçaören, Mihalıcçık
- Aydınlar, Mihalıcçık
- Bahtiyar, Mihalıcçık
- Belen, Mihalıcçık
- Bey, Mihalıcçık
- Çalçı, Mihalıcçık
- Çalkaya, Mihalıcçık
- Çardak, Mihalıcçık
- Çukurören, Mihalıcçık
- Dağcı, Mihalıcçık
- Diközü, Mihalıcçık
- Dinek, Mihalıcçık
- Dümrek, Mihalıcçık
- Gözeler, Mihalıcçık
- Güce, Mihalıcçık
- Güreş, Mihalıcçık
- Gürleyik, Mihalıcçık
- Hamidiye, Mihalıcçık
- Ilıcalar, Mihalıcçık
- İğdecik, Mihalıcçık
- İkizafer, Mihalıcçık
- Karaçam, Mihalıcçık
- Karageyikli, Mihalıcçık
- Kavak, Mihalıcçık
- Kayı, Mihalıcçık
- Kızılbörüklü, Mihalıcçık
- Korucu, Mihalıcçık
- Koyunağılı, Mihalıcçık
- Kozlu, Mihalıcçık
- Lütfiye, Mihalıcçık
- Mahmuthisar, Mihalıcçık
- Narlı, Mihalıcçık
- Obruk, Mihalıcçık
- Otluk, Mihalıcçık
- Ömer, Mihalıcçık
- Saray, Mihalıcçık
- Sazak, Mihalıcçık
- Seki, Mihalıcçık
- Sekiören, Mihalıcçık
- Sorkun, Mihalıcçık
- Süleler, Mihalıcçık
- Tatarcık, Mihalıcçık
- Uşakbükü, Mihalıcçık
- Üçbaşlı, Mihalıcçık
- Yalımkaya, Mihalıcçık
- Yayla, Mihalıcçık
- Yeşilyurt, Mihalıcçık
- Yunusemre, Mihalıcçık

== Sarıcakaya ==
- Sarıcakaya
- Beyköy, Sarıcakaya
- Beyyayla, Sarıcakaya
- Dağküplü, Sarıcakaya
- Düzköy, Sarıcakaya
- Güney, Sarıcakaya
- İğdir, Sarıcakaya
- Kapıkaya, Sarıcakaya
- Laçin, Sarıcakaya
- Mayıslar, Sarıcakaya

== Seyitgazi ==
- Seyitgazi
- Akin, Seyitgazi
- Aksaklı, Seyitgazi
- Arslanbeyi, Seyitgazi
- Ayvalı, Seyitgazi
- Bardakçı, Seyitgazi
- Beşsaray, Seyitgazi
- Beykışla, Seyitgazi
- Büyükdere, Seyitgazi
- Büyükyayla, Seyitgazi
- Cevizli, Seyitgazi
- Çatören, Seyitgazi
- Çukurağıl, Seyitgazi
- Çukurca, Seyitgazi
- Çürüttüm, Seyitgazi
- Değişören, Seyitgazi
- Doğançayır, Seyitgazi
- Fethiye, Seyitgazi
- Gemiç, Seyitgazi
- Göcenoluk, Seyitgazi
- Gökbahçe, Seyitgazi
- Gökcegüney, Seyitgazi
- Göknebi, Seyitgazi
- Gümüşbel, Seyitgazi
- İdrisyayla, Seyitgazi
- İkizoluk, Seyitgazi
- Karacalık, Seyitgazi
- Karaören, Seyitgazi
- Kesenler, Seyitgazi
- Kırka, Seyitgazi
- Kümbet, Seyitgazi
- Numanoluk, Seyitgazi
- Oynaş, Seyitgazi
- Örencik, Seyitgazi
- Salihler, Seyitgazi
- Sancar, Seyitgazi
- Sandıközü, Seyitgazi
- Sarayören, Seyitgazi
- Sarıcailyas, Seyitgazi
- Şükranlı, Seyitgazi
- Taşlık, Seyitgazi
- Üçsaray, Seyitgazi
- Yapıldak, Seyitgazi
- Yarbasan, Seyitgazi
- Yazıdere, Seyitgazi
- Yenikent, Seyitgazi
- Yeşiltepe, Seyitgazi
- Yukarısöğüt, Seyitgazi

== Sivrihisar ==
- Sivrihisar
- Ahiler, Sivrihisar
- Aktaş, Sivrihisar
- Aşağıkepen, Sivrihisar
- Aydınlı, Sivrihisar
- Babadat, Sivrihisar
- Bahçecik, Sivrihisar
- Ballıhisar, Sivrihisar
- Benlikuyu, Sivrihisar
- Benliyaver, Sivrihisar
- Beyyazı, Sivrihisar
- Biçer, Sivrihisar
- Böğürtlen, Sivrihisar
- Buhara, Sivrihisar
- Buzluca, Sivrihisar
- Çandır, Sivrihisar
- Çaykoz, Sivrihisar
- Demirci, Sivrihisar
- Dinek, Sivrihisar
- Dumluca, Sivrihisar
- Dümrek, Sivrihisar
- Elcik, Sivrihisar
- Ertuğrulköy, Sivrihisar
- Gerenli, Sivrihisar
- Göktepe, Sivrihisar
- Gülçayır, Sivrihisar
- Güvemli, Sivrihisar
- Hamamkarahisar, Sivrihisar
- Hüdavendigar, Sivrihisar
- İbikseydi, Sivrihisar
- İğdecik, Sivrihisar
- İlören, Sivrihisar
- İlyaspaşa, Sivrihisar
- İstiklalbağı, Sivrihisar
- Kadıncık, Sivrihisar
- Kaldırımköy, Sivrihisar
- Karaburhan, Sivrihisar
- Karacakaya, Sivrihisar
- Karacaören, Sivrihisar
- Karacaörenyaylası, Sivrihisar
- Karadat, Sivrihisar
- Karakaya, Sivrihisar
- Karkın, Sivrihisar
- Kaymaz, Sivrihisar
- Kertek, Sivrihisar
- Kınık, Sivrihisar
- Koçaş, Sivrihisar
- Koltan, Sivrihisar
- Kurtşeyh, Sivrihisar
- Memik, Sivrihisar
- Mülkköy, Sivrihisar
- Nasrettinhoca, Sivrihisar
- Oğlakçı, Sivrihisar
- Ortaklar, Sivrihisar
- Paşakadın, Sivrihisar
- Sadıkbağı, Sivrihisar
- Sarıkavak, Sivrihisar
- Selimiye, Sivrihisar
- Sığırcık, Sivrihisar
- Tekören, Sivrihisar
- Yaverören, Sivrihisar
- Yenidoğan, Sivrihisar
- Yeniköy, Sivrihisar
- Yeşilköy, Sivrihisar
- Yukarıkepen, Sivrihisar
- Zeyköyü, Sivrihisar

== Recent development ==
According to Law act no 6360, all Turkish provinces with a population more than 750 000, were renamed as metropolitan municipality. All districts in those provinces became second level municipalities and all villages in those districts were renamed as a neighborhoods. Thus the villages listed above are officially neighborhoods of Eskişehir.
