= List of municipalities in Eskişehir Province =

This is the list of municipalities in Eskişehir Province, Turkey as of October 2007.

== Municipalities ==
List is sorted alphabetically A-Z, as Districts->Municipalities.

District	Municipality
Alpu	Alpu
Alpu	Bozan
Alpu	Osmaniye
Beylikova	Beylikova
Çifteler	Çifteler
Eskişehir (Merkez)	Çukurhisar
Eskişehir	Eskişehir
Eskişehir	Gündüzler
Eskişehir	Muttalip
Eskişehir	Odunpazarı
Eskişehir	Tepebaşı
Günyüzü	Gümüşkonak
Günyüzü	Günyüzü
Günyüzü	Kayakent
Han	Han
İnönü	İnönü
Mahmudiye	Mahmudiye
Mihalgazi	Alpagut
Mihalgazi	Mihalgazi
Mihalgazi	Sakarıılıca
Mihalıççık	Dinek
Mihalıççık	Mihalıççık
Mihalıççık	Yunusemre
Sarıcakaya	Laçin
Sarıcakaya	Sarıcakaya
Seyitgazi	Doğançayır
Seyitgazi	Kırka
Seyitgazi	Seyitgazi
Sivrihisar	Dümrek
Sivrihisar	Kaymaz
Sivrihisar	Nasrettinhoca
Sivrihisar	Sivrihisar

== Changes in 2014 ==
According to Law act no. 6360, belde (town) municipalities within provinces with more than 750,000 population (so called Metropolitan municipalities) were abolished as of 30 March 2014. 14 belde municipalities in the above list are now defunct. The list is kept for historical reference.
