= Gökçegüney, Seyitgazi =

Gökçegüney
- Neighbourhood
- Location in Turkey Gökçegüney (Turkey Central Anatolia)
- Coordinates: 39.1999°N 30.6906°E
- Country: Turkey
- Province: Eskişehir
- District: Seyitgazi
- Population (2022): 28
- Time zone: UTC+3 (TRT)
- Postal code: 26950
- Area code: 0222

Gökçegüney, formerly Tonra, is a neighbourhood of the municipality and district of Seyitgazi, Eskişehir Province, Turkey. Its population is 28 (2022).

== Phrygian monument ==
According to information provided by archaeologists, Frenchman Albert-Louis Gabriel (1883–1972) and Dutch C. H. E. Haspels (1894–1980), a small Phrygian rock-cut monument of size 72 cm × 62 cm (28 in × 24 in) existed on a 4.5 m (15 ft)-high rock. Called "Tonra Patlak", it was located on the western slope of the rocky hill Nızıllı Tepe, west of the village road between Gökçegüney and Yazılıkaya villages. The monument was described in detail and was drawn in the 1960s. In the following years, it was completely destroyed, and does not exist anymore.

== Population ==
Historical population
Year	Pop.	±% p.a.
2007	38	—
2012	34	−2.20%
2017	21	−9.19%
2022	28	+5.92%
Source: TÜIK (2007-2022)
