= Pontanena =

Town of ancient Phrygia

Coordinates: 39°21′08″N 30°31′36″E

Pontanena was a town of ancient Phrygia, inhabited during Roman times. Its name does not occur in ancient authors, but is inferred from epigraphic and other evidence.

It is located in present-day Turkey, east of Gemiç in Seyitgazi District, Eskişehir Province.
