= Kümbet, Seyitgazi =

Kümbet
- Neighbourhood
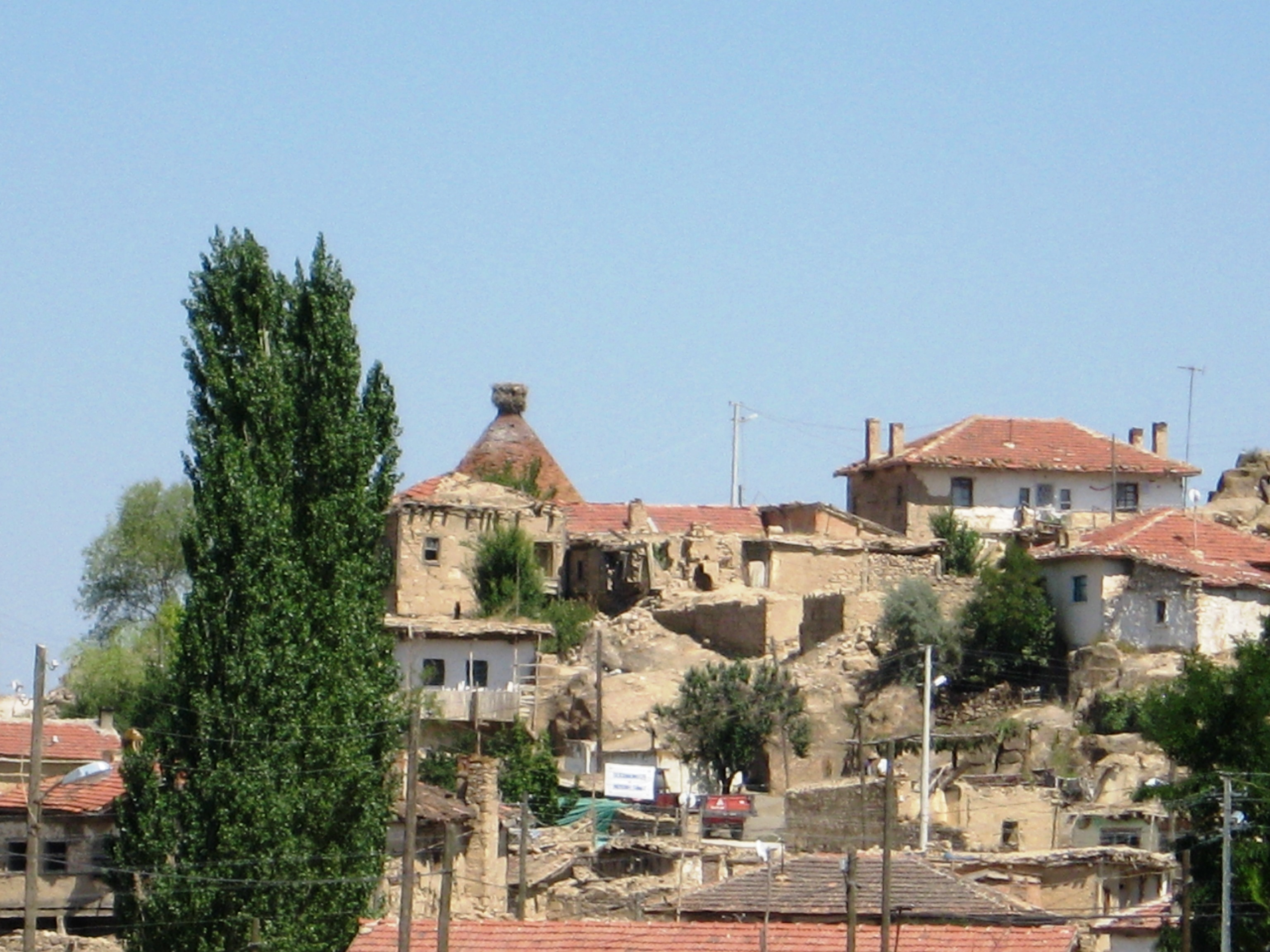

- Location within Turkey Location within Turkey Central Anatolia
- Coordinates: 39.2098°N 30.6061°E
- Country: Turkey
- Province: Eskişehir
- District: Seyitgazi
- Population (2022): 338
- Time zone: UTC+3 (TRT)
- Postal code: 26950
- Area code: 0222

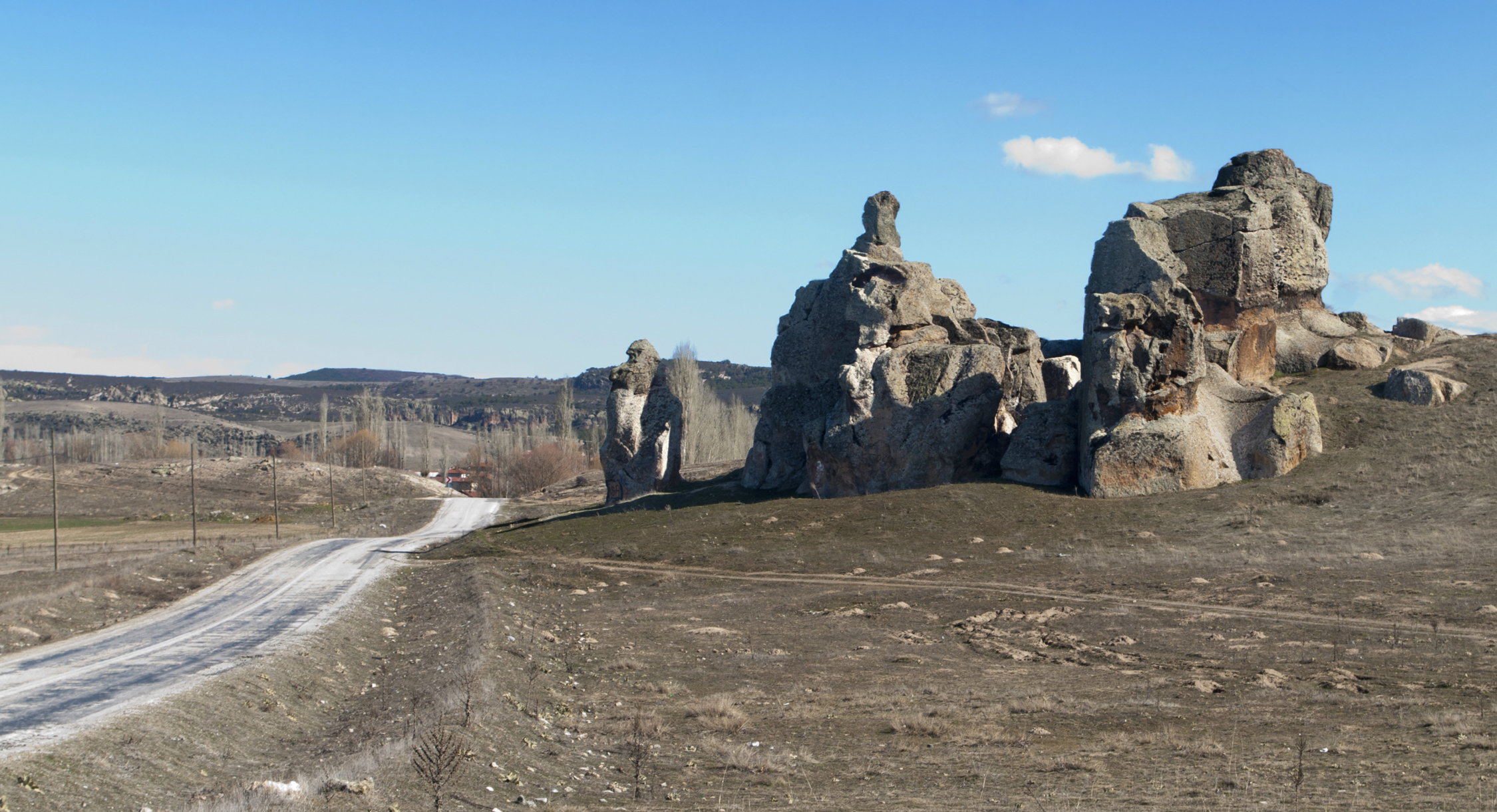
Rock formations

Kümbet, is a neighbourhood of the municipality and district of Seyitgazi, Eskişehir Province, Turkey. Its population is 338 (2022).

== Location ==
Kümbet village is 75 km (47 mi) far from Eskişehir, i 36 km (22 mi) south of Syitgazi, and 2 km (1.2 mi) east of the Eskişehir-Afyonkarahisar highway D-665. It is located in the "Phrygian Valley", and on the Phrygian Way, a marked long-distance hiking and bicycle trail.

== Sites of interest ==
On the slope of the mound, where Kümbet village was founded, the rock-cut tomb of Solon (Lion's Temple) and the Tomb of Himmet Baba are found, which were used in the Phrygian and Roman Empire periods. The tomb's initial construction goes back to the Phrygian period. It was used for the second time in the Roman Empire period, especially with its monumental arrangements and reliefs on its façade. There is a shield in the middle and an eagle relief on each side of the triangular pediment with acroterion, which is carved in high relief. In the tabula ansata below the pediment, there are two lion reliefs placed opposite each other on both sides of the central hole. The tomb takes its name from the name Solon in the inscription on the door lintel of the main chamber. It is also known as the Lion's Temple due to its lion reliefs. The Tomb of Himmet Baba is situated on the Kümbet Rocks. It is dated to the 13th century due to its plan, construction technique and materials used. Its out is octagonal, with a circular interior plan. The tomb was built with ashşar, and its cupola has a pyramidal cone form made of bricks. Marble architectural pieces belonging to the Byzantine Empire period were used at the entrance door. It is understood from the inscriptions on the tombstones of the burial ground around it that it was used until the Ottoman Empire era.

== Population ==
Historical population
Year	Pop.	±% p.a.
2007	524	—
2012	456	−2.74%
2017	378	−3.68%
2022	338	−2.21%
Source: TÜIK (2007-2022)
