= Seyyid Battal Gazi Complex =

Building in Eskişehir, Turkey

Coordinates: 39°26′31″N 30°41′39″E

Seyyid Battal Gazi Complex (Turkish: Seyyid Battal Gazi Külliyesi) is a külliye, historic religious social complex, in Seyitgazi district of Eskişehir Province, Turkey.

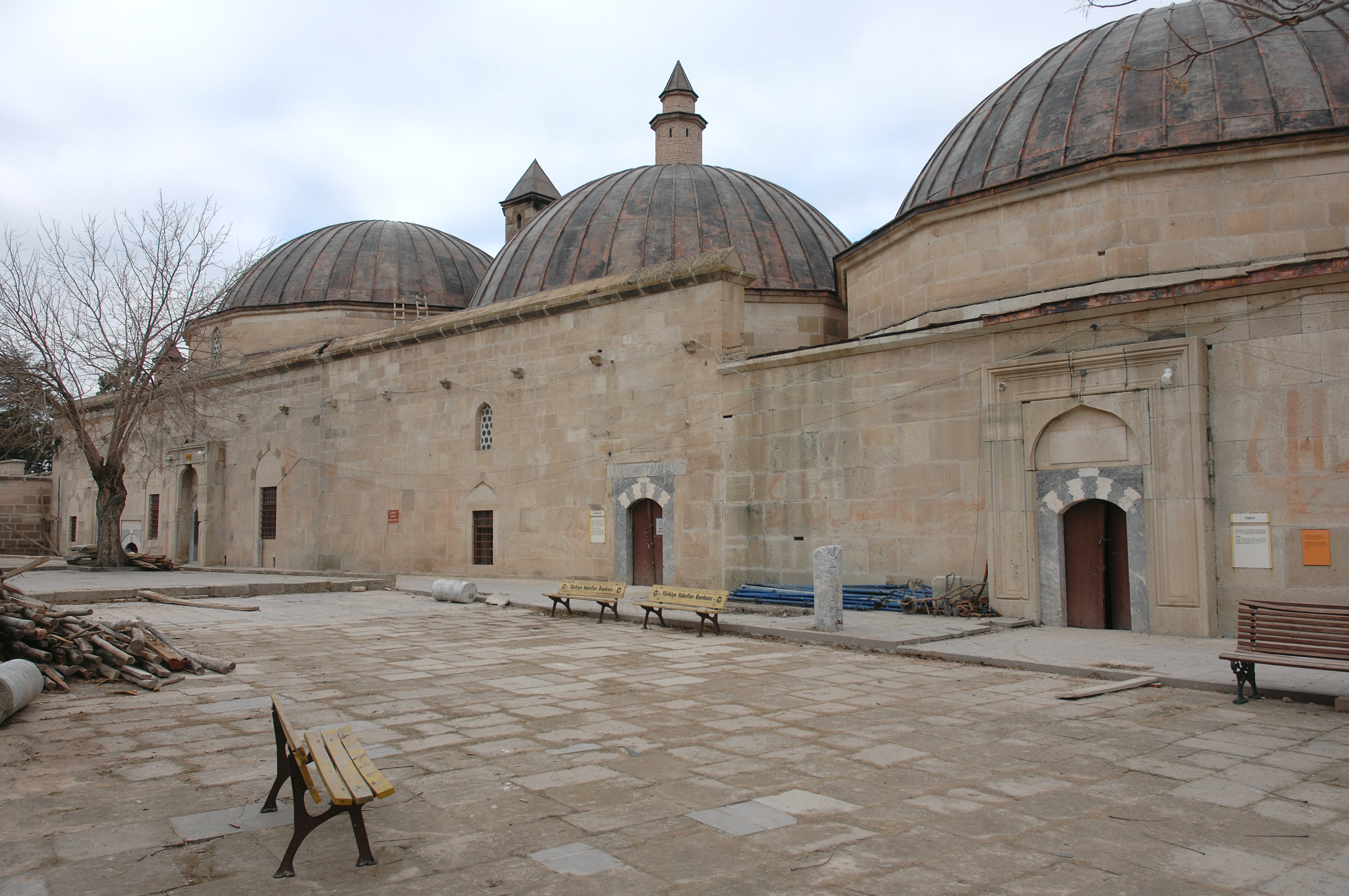
Seyit Battal Gazi Külliyesi courtyard - buildings at north side in 2007

A mosque and a shrine in honor of Seyyid Battal Gazi, a legendary Muslim folk hero, who fell in a battle against the Byzantine army in this area in 720, was built in 1207/08 at a place southeast of Eskişehir, known today as Seyitgazi. It was donated by Ümmühan Hatun, mother of the Seljuq Sultan of Rûm Alaeddin Keyjubat I (1188–1237). During the Ottoman Empire era, social complex buildings were added around the mosque, including madrasa, almshouse and dervish lodge. Ottoman sultans Mehmed the Conqueror (reigned 1444–1446, 1451–1481), Bayezid II (r. 1481–1512) and Selim I (r. 1512–1520) enriched the complex by additional buildings. Suleiman the Magnificent (r. 1520–1566) and his army camped at the site before the Baghdad Campaign (1534). Murad IV (r. 1623–1640) built a caravanserai on the way to Yerevan Campaign (1635). The site of the complex is situated on the Hajj-route of Istanbul-Baghdad-Hejaz serving a stopover place for pilgrims. It is therefore notable in religious sense.

With the building of the madrasa, the complex becomes a center for Islamic studies. Initially hosting the Kalenderi dervishes, it became a center of the Bektashi Order dervishes.

The complex underwent a restoration in 1954 and in 1957. Maintenance work, which began in 2007 came to a stop after two years.
