= Dioskome =

Ancient town

Coordinates: 38°37′51″N 29°35′44″E

Dioskome was a town of ancient Phrygia, inhabited in Hellenistic, Roman, and Byzantine times.

Its site is tentatively located near Kırka in Asiatic Turkey.
