= State road D.665 (Turkey) =

Highway between Eskişehir and Afyonkarahisar in Turkey

D.665

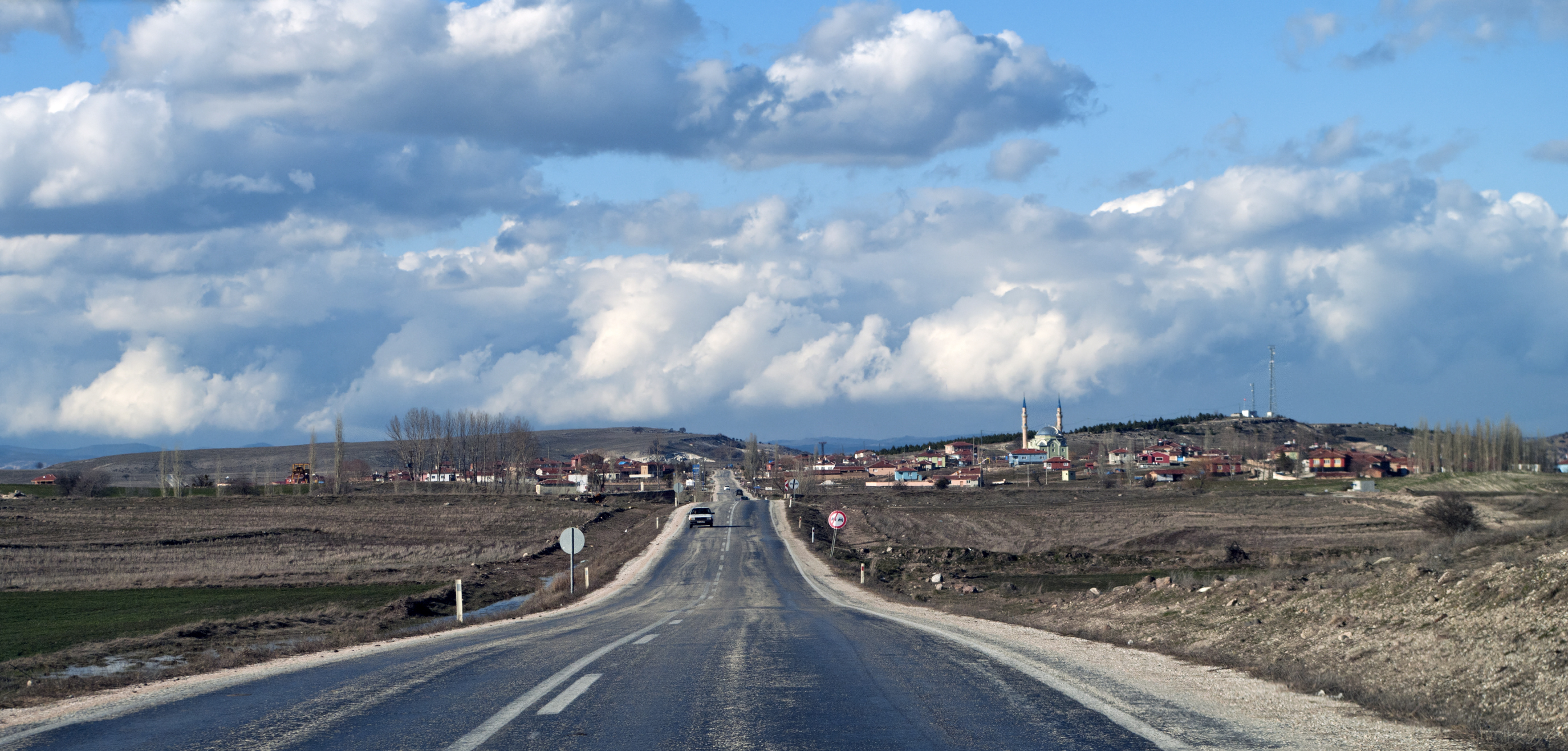

Route information
- Length: 120 km (75 mi)

Major junctions
- North end: Eskişehir
- South end: Afyonkarahisar

Location
- Country: Turkey

Highway system
- Highways in Turkey; Motorways; List; State Highways; List

D.665 is a north-to-south state road in western Turkey. The 120 km (75 mi) long road starts at Eskişehir, in the Eskişehir Province, and ends at the Afyonkarahisar, in a province of the same name.

== Itinerary ==
Province	Location	Distance from			
Province	Location	Eskişehir		Afyonkarahisar	
Province	Location	(km)	(mile)	(km)	(mile)
Eskişehir
Eskişehir	Eskişehir	0	0	120	75
Eskişehir	Akpınar	14	9	106	66
Eskişehir	Seyitgazi	29	18	77	48
Eskişehir	Kırka	27	17	50	31
Eskişehir	Gökbahçe	15	9	35	22
Afyonkarahisar
Afyonkarahisar	İhsaniye	9	6	26	16,
Afyonkarahisar	Çayırbağ	19	12	7	3
Afyonkarahisar	Afyonkarahisar	7	3	0	0
