= Salihler, Seyitgazi =

Salihler
- Neighbourhood
- Location in Turkey Salihler (Turkey Central Anatolia)
- Coordinates: 39.2765°N 30.4500°E
- Country: Turkey
- Province: Eskişehir
- District: Seyitgazi
- Population (2022): 60
- Time zone: UTC+3 (TRT)
- Postal code: 26950
- Area code: 0222

Salihler is a neighbourhood of the municipality and district of Seyitgazi, Eskişehir Province, Turkey. Its population is 60 (2022).

== Population ==
Historical population
Year	Pop.	±% p.a.
2007	84	—
2012	63	−5.59%
2017	53	−3.40%
2022	60	+2.51%
Source: TÜIK (2007-2022)
