= Sandıközü, Seyitgazi =

Sandıközü
- Neighbourhood
- Location in Turkey Sandıközü (Turkey Central Anatolia)
- Coordinates: 39.3854°N 30.3551°E
- Country: Turkey
- Province: Eskişehir
- District: Seyitgazi
- Population (2022): 86
- Time zone: UTC+3 (TRT)
- Postal code: 26950
- Area code: 0222

Sandıközü is a neighbourhood of the municipality and district of Seyitgazi, Eskişehir Province, Turkey. Its population is 86 (2022). A 20 m (66 ft)-high and over 700 years-old protected monumental black pine tree, the Pinus nigra of İkizçeşmeler (Turkish: İkizçeşmeler çamı), is situated at İkizçeşmeler location of the village.

== Population ==
Historical population
Year	Pop.	±% p.a.
2007	77	—
2012	69	−2.17%
2017	56	−4.09%
2022	86	+8.96%
Source: TÜIK (2007-2022)
