= Akpınar, Odunpazarı =

Akpınar
- Neighbourhood
- Location in Turkey Akpınar (Turkey Central Anatolia)
- Coordinates: 39.6635°N 30.5458°E
- Country: Turkey
- Province: Eskişehir
- District: Odunpazarı
- Population (2022): 4,511
- Time zone: UTC+3 (TRT)
- Postal code: 26004
- Area code: 0222

Akpınar is a neighbourhood of the municipality and district of Odunpazarı, Eskişehir Province, Turkey. Its population is 4,511 (2022). It is 14 km (8.7 mi) from Eskişehir on the Eskişehir-Afyonkarahisar highway D-665.

The inhabitants are mostly of Circassian origin from Besleney and Hatuqay tribes. The economy of the village is based on agriculture and animal husbandry. The village neighbors to Sarısungur, Derbent, Süpren and Çağlayan. Eskişehir Prison of Type H is located within the village area. The location is served by citybus line.

== Population ==
Historical population
| Year | Pop. | ±% p.a. |
|---|---|---|
| 2007 | 625 | — |
| 2012 | 1,702 | +22.18% |
| 2017 | 2,364 | +6.79% |
| 2022 | 4,511 | +13.80% |
Source: TÜIK (2007-2022)
