= Oynaş, Seyitgazi =

Oynaş
- Neighbourhood
- Location in Turkey Oynaş (Turkey Central Anatolia)
- Coordinates: 39.1715°N 30.6280°E
- Country: Turkey
- Province: Eskişehir
- District: Seyitgazi
- Population (2022): 39
- Time zone: UTC+3 (TRT)
- Postal code: 26950
- Area code: 0222

Oynaş is a neighbourhood of the municipality and district of Seyitgazi, Eskişehir Province, Turkey. Its population is 39 (2022).

== Population ==
Historical population
Year	Pop.	±% p.a.
2007	41	—
2012	34	−3.68%
2017	36	+1.15%
2022	39	+1.61%
Source: TÜIK (2007-2022)
