= Ortaköy, Çifteler =

Ortaköy
- Neighbourhood
- Country: Turkey
- Province: Eskişehir
- District: Çifteler
- Population (2022): 323
- Time zone: UTC+3 (TRT)
- Area code: 0222

Ortaköy is a neighbourhood of the municipality and district of Çifteler, Eskişehir Province, Turkey. Its population is 323 (2022). It is 97 km from Eskişehir city.

== Population ==
Historical population
Year	Pop.	±% p.a.
1997	460	—
2007	436	−0.53%
2012	378	−2.81%
2017	319	−3.34%
2022	323	+0.25%
Source: 1997 census and TÜIK (2007-2022)
