= Çukurca, Seyitgazi =

Çukurca
- Neighbourhood
- Location in Turkey Çukurca (Turkey Central Anatolia)
- Coordinates: 39.2286°N 30.7017°E
- Country: Turkey
- Province: Eskişehir
- District: Seyitgazi
- Population (2022): 71
- Time zone: UTC+3 (TRT)
- Postal code: 26950
- Area code: 0222

Çukurca is a neighbourhood of the municipality and district of Seyitgazi, Eskişehir Province, Turkey. Its population is 71 (2022).

== Population ==
Historical population
Year	Pop.	±% p.a.
2007	125	—
2012	95	−5.34%
2017	87	−1.74%
2022	71	−3.98%
Source: TÜIK (2007-2022)
