= Çifteler =

- District and municipality
- Map showing Çifteler District in Eskişehir Province

- Location in Turkey Çifteler (Turkey Central Anatolia)
- Coordinates: 39°22′59″N 31°02′21″E
- Country: Turkey
- Province: Eskişehir

Government
  - Mayor: Zehra Konakci (CHP)
- Area: 858 km^{2} (331 sq mi)
- Elevation: 869 m (2,851 ft)
- Population (2022): 14,906
  - Density: 17.4/km^{2} (45.0/sq mi)
- Time zone: UTC+3 (TRT)
- Postal code: 26700
- Area code: 0222
- Website: www.cifteler.bel.tr

Çifteler is a municipality and district of Eskişehir Province, Turkey. Its area is 858 km^{2}, and its population is 14,906 (2022). Its elevation is 869 m (2,851 ft). It borders with Sivrihisar, Seyitgazi, Han and Mahmudiye districts, and Afyonkarahisar Province.

It was established as a district in 1951. The livelihood of the people of the region is based on animal husbandry, primarily agriculture. Aquaculture is also popular in Çifteler. The region, which was under the influence of Phrygian and Roman in ancient times, was known for grain production during the Ottoman period. The origin of the name is based on the fact that the region, which was called "Çifteli" in 1795, changed into Çifteler over time. Sakaryabaşı is offered to visitors as a natural beauty near the district.

== Composition ==
There are 28 neighbourhoods in Çifteler District:

- Abbashalimpaşa
- Adalar
- Alikan
- Arslanlı
- Başkurt
- Belpınar
- Çatmapınar
- Çiftçi
- Dikilikaya
- Dikmen
- Doğanay
- Eminekin
- Erbap
- Hayriye
- Ilıcabaşı
- Kadıkuyusu
- Körhasan
- Orhaniye
- Ortaköy
- Osmaniye
- Sadıroğlu
- Saithalimpaşa
- Sakarya
- Sarıkavak
- Yeni
- Yenidoğan
- Yıldızören
- Zaferhamit

== Notable natives ==
- Gürer Aykal (born 1942), conductor
