= Gökbahçe, Seyitgazi =

Gökbahçe
- Neighbourhood
- Location in Turkey Gökbahçe (Turkey Central Anatolia)
- Coordinates: 39.1576°N 30.5924°E
- Country: Turkey
- Province: Eskişehir
- District: Seyitgazi
- Population (2022): 389
- Time zone: UTC+3 (TRT)
- Postal code: 26950
- Area code: 0222

Gökbahçe is a neighbourhood of the municipality and district of Seyitgazi, Eskişehir Province, Turkey. Its population is 389 (2022). It is 85 km (53 mi) far from Eskişehir and 42 km (26 mi) from Seyitgazi on the Eskişehir-Afyonkarahisar highway D.665.

== Population ==
Historical population
| Year | Pop. | ±% p.a. |
|---|---|---|
| 2007 | 441 | — |
| 2012 | 445 | +0.18% |
| 2017 | 412 | −1.53% |
| 2022 | 389 | −1.14% |
Source: TÜIK (2007-2022)
