= Osmaniye, Eskişehir =

Osmaniye
- Neighbourhood
- Location in Turkey Osmaniye (Turkey Central Anatolia)
- Coordinates: 39°51′N 30°55′E
- Country: Turkey
- Province: Eskişehir
- District: Alpu
- Elevation: 780 m (2,560 ft)
- Population (2022): 765
- Time zone: UTC+3 (TRT)
- Postal code: 26850
- Area code: 0222

Osmaniye is a neighbourhood of the municipality and district of Alpu, Eskişehir Province, Turkey. Its population is 765 (2022). Before the 2013 reorganisation, it was a town (belde). It is situated in the plains of Central Anatolia. Distance to Alpu is 10 kilometres (6.2 mi) and to Eskişehir is 36 kilometres (22 mi). The settlement was founded by Pomak people from Lovech and Plovdiv (now in Bulgaria) after the Russo-Turkish War (1877-1878). In 1992, Osmaniye was declared a seat of township .
