= Alpagut, Mihalgazi =

Alpagut
- Neighbourhood
- Location in Turkey Alpagut (Turkey Central Anatolia)
- Coordinates: 40°01′N 30°30′E
- Country: Turkey
- Province: Eskişehir
- District: Mihalgazi
- Elevation: 340 m (1,120 ft)
- Population (2022): 657
- Time zone: UTC+3 (TRT)
- Postal code: 26880
- Area code: 0222

Alpagut ("Alpagut" is an Old Turkic word meaning "holy warrior") is a neighbourhood of the municipality and district of Mihalgazi, Eskişehir Province, Turkey. Its population is 657 (2022). Before the 2013 reorganisation, it was a town (belde). It is situated to the south of Sakarya River. The distance to Mihalgazi is 8 kilometres (5.0 mi) and to Eskişehir is 32 kilometres (20 mi). Main economic sector of the town is fruit farming (pomegranate, figs, plums, grapes etc.).
