= Yunusemre, Mihalıççık =

Yunusemre Saru
- Neighbourhood
- Location in Turkey Yunusemre (Turkey Central Anatolia)
- Coordinates: 39°42′N 31°29′E
- Country: Turkey
- Province: Eskişehir
- District: Mihalıççık
- Elevation: 740 m (2,430 ft)
- Population (2022): 621
- Time zone: UTC+3 (TRT)
- Postal code: 26940
- Area code: 0222

Yunusemre (former Saru) is a neighbourhood of the municipality and district of Mihalıççık, Eskişehir Province, Turkey. Its population was 621 in 2022. Before the 2013 reorganisation, it was a town (belde). It is named after the great Turkish poet Yunus Emre (1240–1321) whose tomb is in the town.

== Geography ==
Yunusemre is situated along the Porsuk River and the railroad connecting Ankara to Istanbul. It is 22 kilometres (14 mi) south of Mihalıcçık and 100 kilometres (62 mi) east of Eskişehir.

== History ==
There was an underground settlement around Yunusemre during the Roman Empire. But the present settlement was founded after 1074 when Seljuk Turks began controlling the area. Initially there were only few houses around the tomb of Yunus Emre. But after the construction of the railroad in 1892, new quarters appeared around the station. In 1953 it was renamed as Yunusemre and in 1991 it was declared a seat of township.

== Economy ==
The major economic activities are irrigated farming, cattle breeding and dairying. Although there are marble quarries to the south of the town they are inactive.
