= Nasrettinhoca =

- Neighbourhood
- Location in Turkey Nasrettinhoca (Turkey Central Anatolia)
- Coordinates: 39°31′N 31°40′E
- Country: Turkey
- Province: Eskişehir
- District: Sivrihisar
- Elevation: 860 m (2,820 ft)
- Population (2022): 414
- Time zone: UTC+3 (TRT)
- Postal code: 26600
- Area code: 0222

Nasrettinhoca (formerly Hortu) is a neighbourhood of the municipality and district of Sivrihisar, Eskişehir Province, Turkey. Its population is 414 (2022). Before the 2013 reorganisation, it was a town (belde). It is situated along a tributary of Sakarya River. The distance to Sivrihisar is 26 kilometres (16 mi) and to Eskişehir is 116 kilometres (72 mi).

The town is a historical settlement and it is named after Nasrettin Hoca, the famous Turkish popular philosopher and satirist of the 13th century. The town municipality claims that he was born in a historical house of the town, (now under restoration) in 1208. (However, there are other claimants for Nasrettin Hoca's home like Akşehir) Like most other Central Anatolian towns, the town loses population because of migration to cities.
