= Bozan, Alpu =

Bozan
- Neighbourhood
- Location in Turkey Bozan (Turkey Central Anatolia)
- Coordinates: 39°47′N 31°06′E
- Country: Turkey
- Province: Eskişehir
- District: Alpu
- Elevation: 810 m (2,660 ft)
- Population (2022): 1,285
- Time zone: UTC+3 (TRT)
- Postal code: 26850
- Area code: 0222

Bozan is a neighbourhood of the municipality and district of Alpu, Eskişehir Province, Turkey. Its population is 1,285 (2022). Before the 2013 reorganisation, it was a town (belde). Bozon is to the east of both Alpu and Eskişehir. The distance to Alpu is 14 kilometres (8.7 mi) and to Eskişehir is 55 kilometres (34 mi). The settlement was originally built by the ancient Persian Empire which ruled the region. According to one survey, Bozon is one of the places which were allocated to Ertuğrul, the father of Osman I, the founder of the Ottoman Empire.
