= Doğançayır =

- Neighbourhood
- Location within Turkey Location within Turkey Central Anatolia
- Coordinates: 39°32′07″N 30°49′47″E
- Country: Turkey
- Province: Eskişehir
- District: Seyitgazi
- Population (2022): 774
- Time zone: UTC+3 (TRT)
- Postal code: 26950
- Area code: 0222

Doğançayır is a neighbourhood of the municipality and district of Seyitgazi, Eskişehir Province, Turkey. Its population is 774 (2022). Before the 2013 reorganisation, it was a town (belde). Formerly known as Arapören.

== Location ==
Doğançayır is about 50 km (31 mi) from Eskişehir and 26 km (16 mi) from Seyitgazi. Hamidiye junction on the Eskişehir-Ankara highway is 10 km (6 mi) away from Doğançayır.

=== Geography ===
Doğançayır is a considered to be a plain. The land owned by the people living currently in Doğançayır is about 90 hectares. The Kırkkız Mountain, where the TV transmitter is located, is the only peak around the town which has an approximate height of 1800 m. The town is established on the foot of the mountain. The Seydisuyu, an important branch of the Sakarya River, passes through the town. Two bridges in Doğançayır connect the banks of the river. Although there used to be the danger of floods from the river in the spring, after the construction of the Çatıören Dam, it is possible to pass across the river using stepping stones on the water.

== Economy ==
Economic activities in Doğançayır are mostly limited to farming and stock raising. Sugar beets, wheat, sunflower and clover are the most favored crops.

== Culture ==
Doğançayır is an Alevi town, whereas people from Sunni origins also live in. It is possible to recognize aspects of Alevi beliefs. Doğançayır is culturally most famous for organizing an annual remembrance day for Nazım Hikmet on June 3.

== Bibliography ==
- Albek, Mine; Bakır Öğtveren, Ülker; Albek, Erdem (January 2004). "Hydrological modeling of Seydi Suyu watershed (Turkey) with HSPF". Anadolu University Journal of Journal of Hydrology. 285 (1–4): 260–271. Bibcode:2004JHyd..285..260A. doi:10.1016/j.jhydrol.2003.09.002.
- Cicek, Arzu; Tokatli, Cem; Kose, Esengul (27 August 2017). "Ecological Risk Indices to Evaluate the Sediment Quality of Seydisuyu Stream Basin". Iğdır University Journal of Science and Technology (in Turkish and English). 7 (2): 115–123. doi:10.21597/jist.2017.148. ISSN 2146-0574.
