= Dinek =

- Neighbourhood
- Location in Turkey Dinek (Turkey Central Anatolia)
- Coordinates: 39°59′N 31°22′E
- Country: Turkey
- Province: Eskişehir
- District: Mihalıççık
- Elevation: 770 m (2,530 ft)
- Population (2022): 195
- Time zone: UTC+3 (TRT)
- Postal code: 26940
- Area code: 0222

Dinek is a neighbourhood of the municipality and district of Mihalıççık, Eskişehir Province, Turkey. Its population is 195 (2022). Before the 2013 reorganisation, it was a town (belde). It is situated to the south of Sarıyar and Gökçekaya dam reservoirs. The distance to Mihalıçcık is 23 kilometres (14 mi). The town has lost a considerable portion of its population because of migration to cities. According to mayor's page the origin of the town people were the Chepni tribe of Turkmens who had migrated from Greater Khorasan in the 15th century.
