= Han, Eskişehir =

Han
- District and municipality
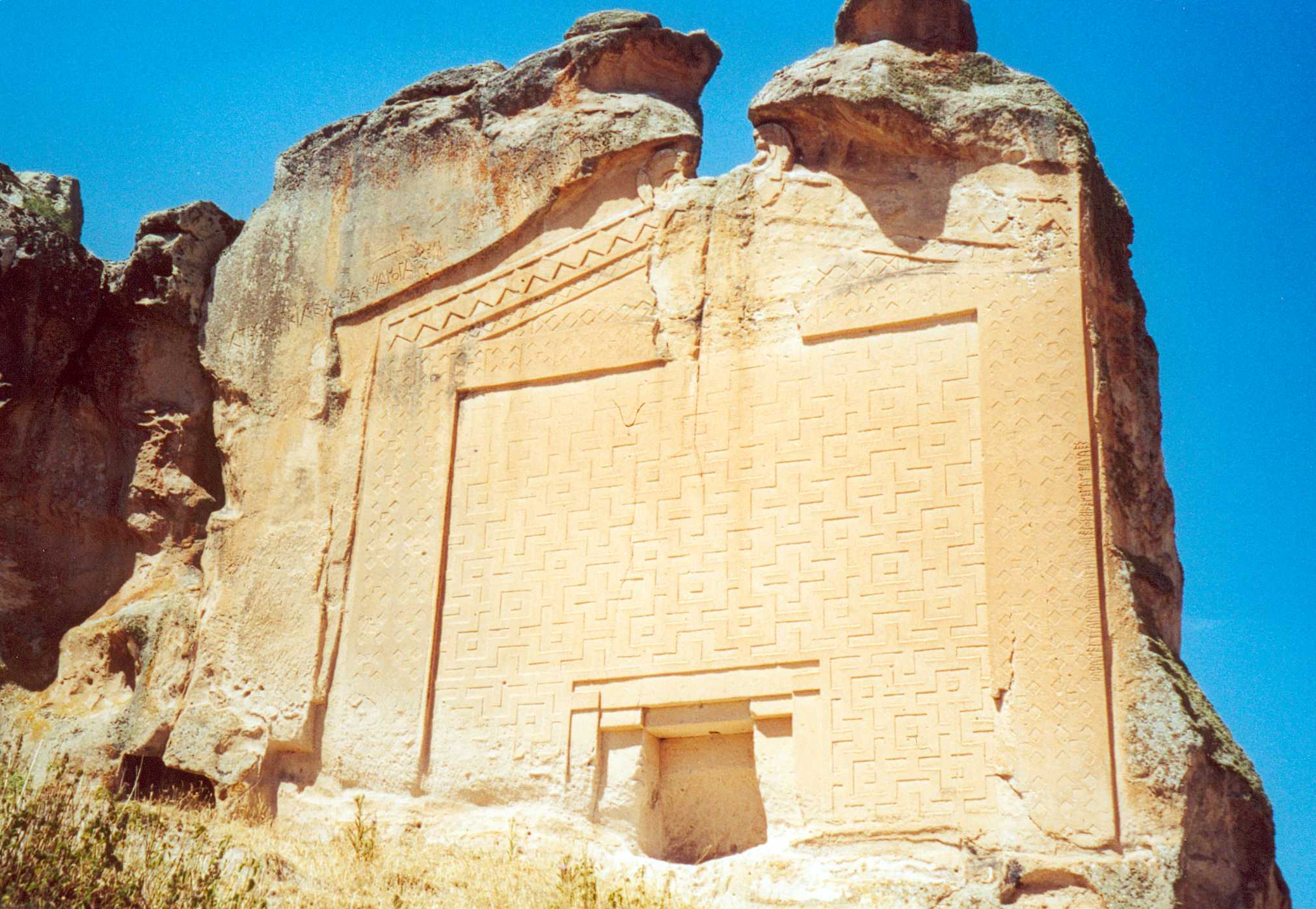
- Midas Tomb in Yazılı village

- Map showing Han District in Eskişehir Province

- Location within Turkey Location within Turkey Central Anatolia
- Coordinates: 39°09′33″N 30°51′41″E
- Country: Turkey
- Province: Eskişehir

Government
  - Mayor: Bekir Berceli (AKP)
- Area: 378 km^{2} (146 sq mi)
- Elevation: 1,220 m (4,000 ft)
- Population (2022): 2,052
  - Density: 5.43/km^{2} (14.1/sq mi)
- Time zone: UTC+3 (TRT)
- Area code: 0222
- Website: www.han.bel.tr

Han, formerly Hanköy and Hüsrevpaşa, is a municipality and district of Eskişehir Province, Turkey. Its area is 378 km^{2}, and its population is 2,052 (2022). The town lies at an elevation of 1,220 m (4,003 ft).

The district is surrounded by Çifteler and Seyitgazi districts and Afyonkarahisar Province. Han, whose municipal organization was established in 1967, became a district in 1990. Their livelihood is based on agriculture and animal husbandry. The town has a rich historical heritage and was built by Murad IV during the Ottoman period. Caravanserai, mosques, baths and fountains were built with the orders of Murad. Evliya Çelebi's Seyahatname contains statements stating that Han was an important stopping point.

== Composition ==
There are 15 neighbourhoods in Han District:

- Ağlarca
- Akdere
- Akhisar
- Başara
- Erten
- Gökçekuyu
- Gökçeyayla
- Hacılar
- Hankaraağaç
- Hüsrevpaşa
- İskankuyu
- Kayı
- Peçene
- Tepeköy
- Yazılı
