= Yazılı, Han =

Phrygian archeological site in Turkey

Yazılı
- Neighbourhood
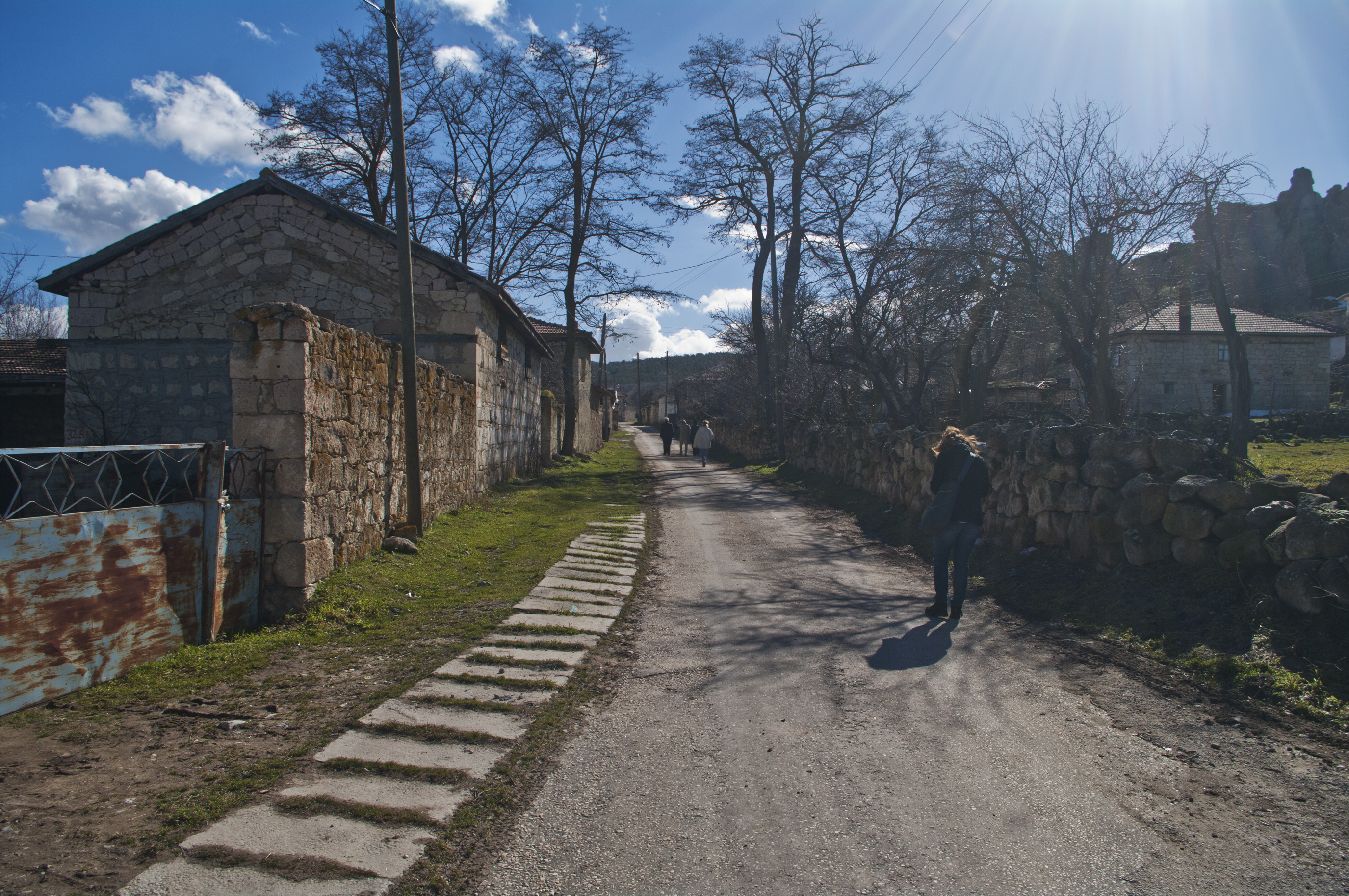
- Street in Yazılı village

- Location within Turkey Location within Turkey Central Anatolia
- Coordinates: 39°12′N 30°43′E
- Country: Turkey
- Province: Eskişehir
- District: Han
- Population (2022): 45
- Time zone: UTC+3 (TRT)
- Area code: 0222

Yazılı (also: Yazılıkaya, lit. 'inscribed rock'), Phrygian Yazılıkaya, or Midas Kenti (Midas city) is a neighbourhood of the municipality and district of Han, Eskişehir Province, Turkey. Its population is 45 (2022). It is located about 27 km south of Seyitgazi, 66 km south of Eskişehir, and 51 km north of Afyonkarahisar. It is known for its Phrygian archaeological remains and inscription mentioning Midas.

The ancient remains consist of a settlement, sometimes Midas City and a number of rock-cut reliefs, of which the most famous is the Midas Monument, formerly identified as the tomb of Midas. There are two other rock-cut reliefs, known as the Unfinished monument and the Hyacinth monuments.

== The Midas Monument ==
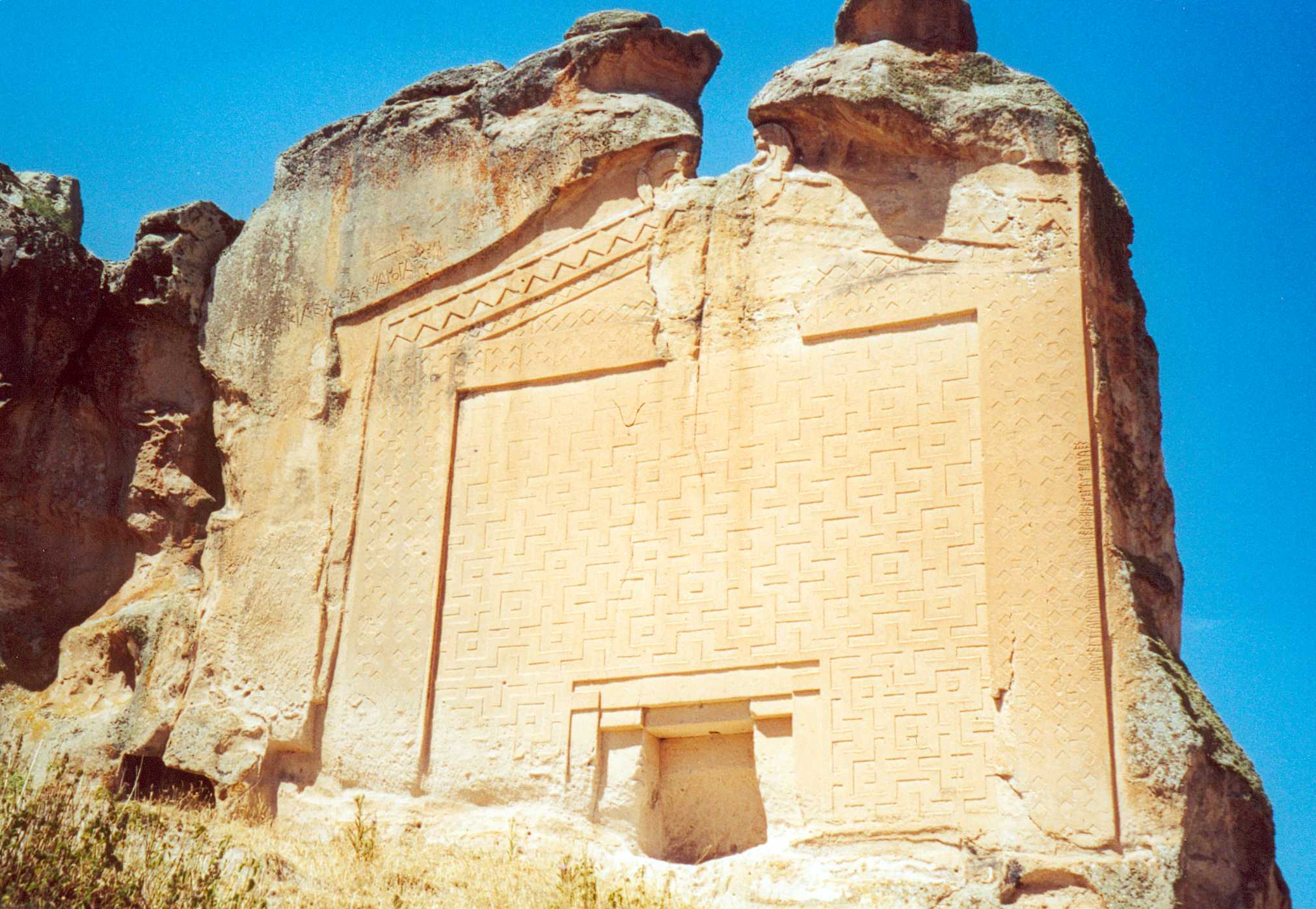
The Midas Monument

The most prominent feature of the site is the Midas Monument, a high rock-cut facade in the cliff face of the citadel. The relief takes the form of a pedimented temple front with acroteria, and an abstract geometric design which appears to imitate the terra cotta facings of buildings. There is a niche at the bottom center, with walls bearing graffiti that read MATAR (Mother, i.e. the goddess Cybele) and it probably held a statue of Cybele.

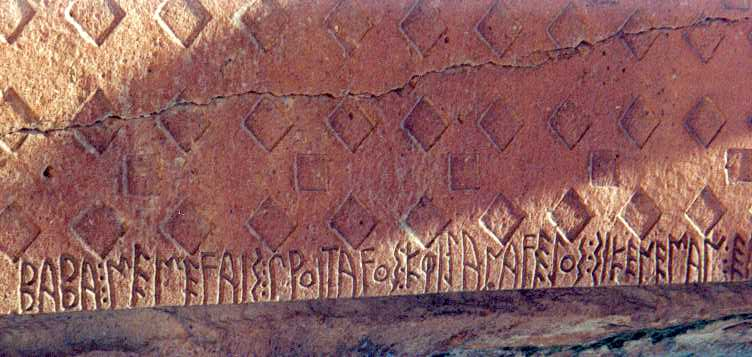
Part of the inscription on the side, reading ΒΑΒΑ: ΜΕΜΕϜΑΙΣ: ΠΡΟΙΤΑϜΟΣ: ΚΦΙJΑΝΑϜΕJΟΣ: ΣΙΚΕΝΕΜΑΝ: ΕΔΑΕΣ 'Baba, advisor, leader from Tyana, dedicated this niche'.

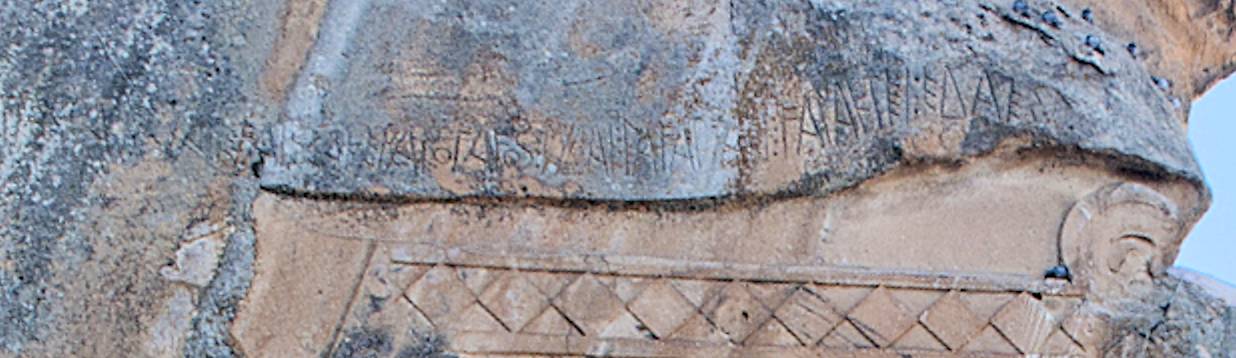
The Midas inscription over the cornice, reading ATES... MIDAI LAVAGTAEI VANAKTEI EDAES 'Ates.... has dedicated [this monument] to Midas, leader of the people and ruler'.

The monument carries a dedication in Old Phrygian by Ates son of Arkias to Midas. The inscription mentions Midas with his titles: MIDAI LAVAGTAEI VANAKTEI, probably meaning "leader of the people" and "ruler". The inscription is:

ATES... MIDAI LAVAGTAEI VANAKTEI EDAES
Ates.... has dedicated (this monument) to Midas, lavagtas and vanax.

The name Ates, a variant of Attis, is a prominent name in Phrygia, associated with royalty. The fact that the dedication is made to Midas may indicate that he had received posthumous ruler cult.

Various indications place the date of the monument's construction in the early to mid seventh century BC, as one of the first in a series of rock cut monuments to be built in western Phrygia. The inscription probably indicates that the monument was erected after the death of Midas in the early seventh century BC. Another inscription, on the right side of the monument includes the letter yodh, which was added to the Phrygian alphabet in the mid-sixth century BC. It shows that the monument was complete before this date, since it was added after the monument was finished. The abstract designs on the facade are stylistically comparable to architectural terracottas of central Anatolia dating from before ca. 600 BC.

== Excavation history ==
The site was excavated by the French Archaeological Institute immediately before and after the Second World War, and also in the 1990s by the Eskişehir Museum.

== Bibliography ==
- Piotr Bienkowski, Alan Millard, Dictionary of the Ancient Near East, p. 198.
- Albert Gabriel, "Au sujet du «Monument de Midas»", Comptes rendus de l'académie des inscriptions 94:2:202-208 (1950)
- C.H.E. Haspels, The Highlands of Phrygia: Sites and Monuments, 1971, ISBN 0691038635.
- Mark Henderson Munn, The Mother of the Gods, Athens, And the Tyranny of Asia
- William Mitchell Ramsay, "The Rock Necropoleis of Phrygia", Journal of Hellenic Studies 3, 1882.
