= Laçin, Eskişehir =

Laçin
- Neighbourhood
- Location in Turkey Laçin (Turkey Central Anatolia)
- Coordinates: 40°03′N 30°46′E
- Country: Turkey
- Province: Eskişehir
- District: Sarıcakaya
- Elevation: 260 m (850 ft)
- Population (2022): 471
- Time zone: UTC+3 (TRT)
- Postal code: 26870
- Area code: 0222

Laçin is a neighbourhood of the municipality and district of Sarıcakaya, Eskişehir Province, Turkey. Its population is 471 (2022). Before the 2013 reorganisation, it was a town (belde). It is situated along the Sakarya River. The distance to Sarıcakaya is 15 kilometres (9.3 mi) and to Eskişehir is 55 kilometres (34 mi). The history of the settlement goes back to 16th century. The main economic activities of the town are agriculture, sheep and cattle breeding and lately poultry rising. The town is also known for mineral water sources around.
