= Beylikova =

- District and municipality
- Map showing Beylikova District in Eskişehir Province

- Location in Turkey Beylikova (Turkey Central Anatolia)
- Coordinates: 39°41′13″N 31°12′20″E
- Country: Turkey
- Province: Eskişehir

Government
  - Mayor: Halan Karabacak (CHP)
- Area: 715 km^{2} (276 sq mi)
- Elevation: 764 m (2,507 ft)
- Population (2022): 5,781
  - Density: 8.09/km^{2} (20.9/sq mi)
- Time zone: UTC+3 (TRT)
- Postal code: 26750
- Area code: 0222
- Website: www.beylikova.bel.tr

Beylikova, formerly Beylikahır, is a municipality and district of Eskişehir Province, Turkey. Its area is 715 km^{2}, and its population is 5,781 (2022). The town lies at an elevation of 764 m (2,507 ft).

Beylikova hosted the Hittite civilization in prehistoric times. Later, the Phrygians, Lydians and the Persian Kingdom took control of this region. The Roman Empire also ruled over this region, but left no obvious artifacts built.

While the Anatolian Seljuk State annexed this region to Turkish lands, Beylikova became a great center where horses were fed and looked after. While the name of the district was "Beylikahir" at the time, it was changed to "Beylikova" in 1985.

== Composition ==
There are 25 neighbourhoods in Beylikova District:

- Akköprü
- Aşağıdudaş
- Aşağıiğdeağacı
- Ata
- Doğanoğlu
- Doğray
- Emircik
- Gökçeayva
- Halilbağı
- İkipınar
- İmikler
- Kızılcaören
- Köprübaşı
- Okçu
- Parsıbey
- Rahmiye
- Süleymaniye
- Sultaniye
- Uzunburun
- Yalınlı
- Yeni
- Yeniyurt
- Yukarıdudaş
- Yukarıiğdeağacı
- Yunus Emre
