= Alpu =

- District and municipality
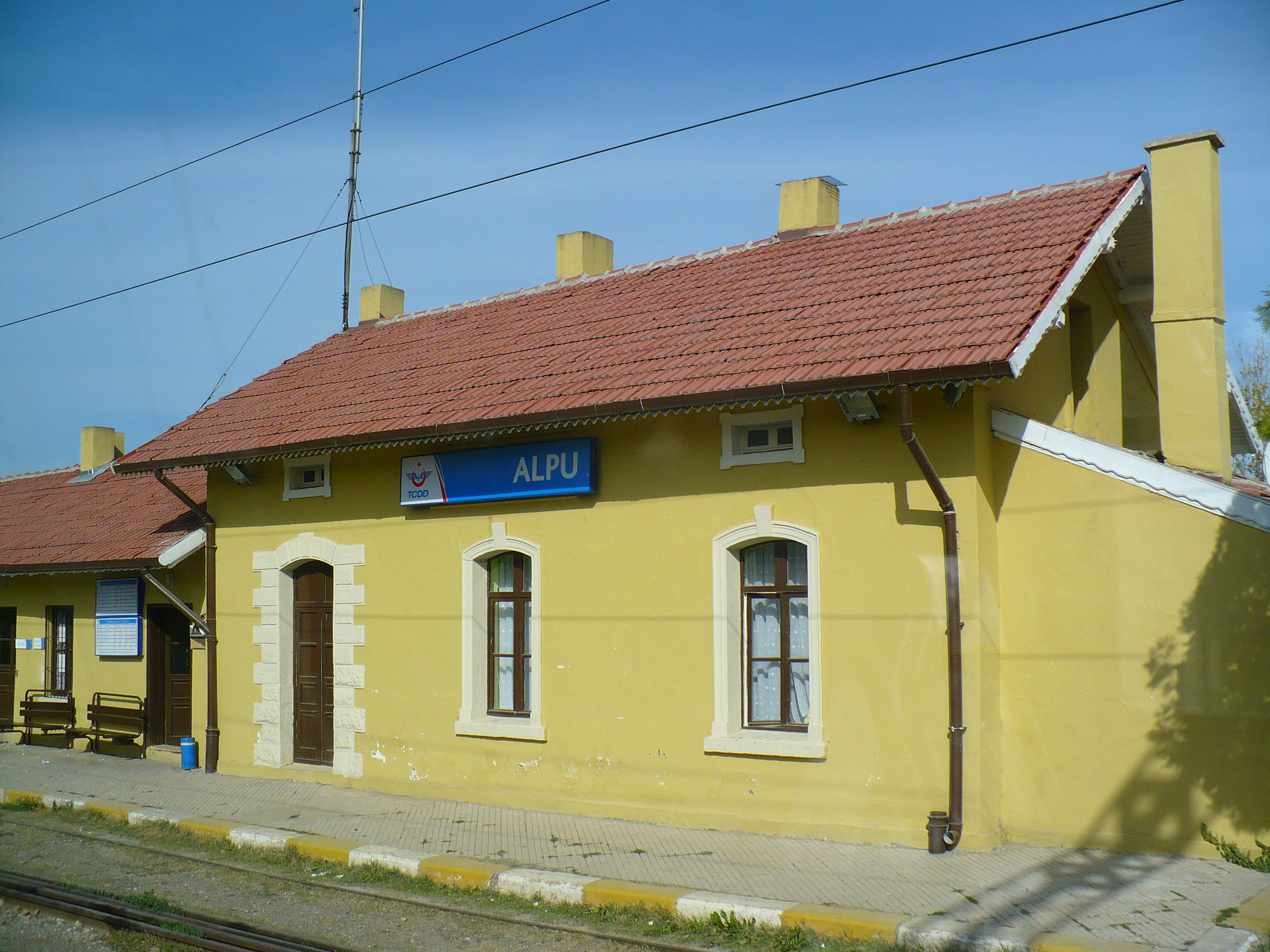
- Alpu train station

- Map showing Alpu District in Eskişehir Province

- Location within Turkey Location within Turkey Central Anatolia
- Coordinates: 39°46′N 30°57′E
- Country: Turkey
- Province: Eskişehir

Government
  - Mayor: Gürbüz Güller (CHP)
- Area: 1,028 km^{2} (397 sq mi)
- Elevation: 764 m (2,507 ft)
- Population (2022): 9,966
  - Density: 9.695/km^{2} (25.11/sq mi)
- Time zone: UTC+3 (TRT)
- Postal code: 26630
- Area code: 0222
- Website: www.alpu.bel.tr

Alpu (also: Alpıköy) is a municipality and district of Eskişehir Province, Turkey. Its area is 1,028 km^{2}, and its population is 9,966 (2022). The town lies at an elevation of 764 m (2,507 ft).

== Composition ==
There are 33 neighbourhoods in Alpu District:

- Ağaçhisar
- Aktepe
- Alapınar
- Arıkaya
- Bahçecik
- Başören
- Belkese
- Bozan
- Büğdüz
- Çardakbaşı
- Çerkez Çukurhisar
- Dereköy
- Esence
- Fatih
- Fevzi Paşa
- Fevziye
- Gökçekaya
- Gökçeoğlu
- Güroluk
- Işıkören
- Karacaören
- Karakamış
- Kemalpaşa
- Koşmat
- Mamure
- Osmaniye
- Özdenk
- Sakarıkaracaören
- Sarıkavak
- Söğütçük
- Uyuzhamamköyü
- Yeşildon
- Yunusemre
