= Kırka, Seyitgazi =

Kırka
- Neighbourhood
- Location in Turkey Kırka (Turkey Central Anatolia)
- Coordinates: 39°17′N 30°32′E
- Country: Turkey
- Province: Eskişehir
- District: Seyitgazi
- Elevation: 1,060 m (3,480 ft)
- Population (2022): 3,039
- Time zone: UTC+3 (TRT)
- Postal code: 26950
- Area code: 0222

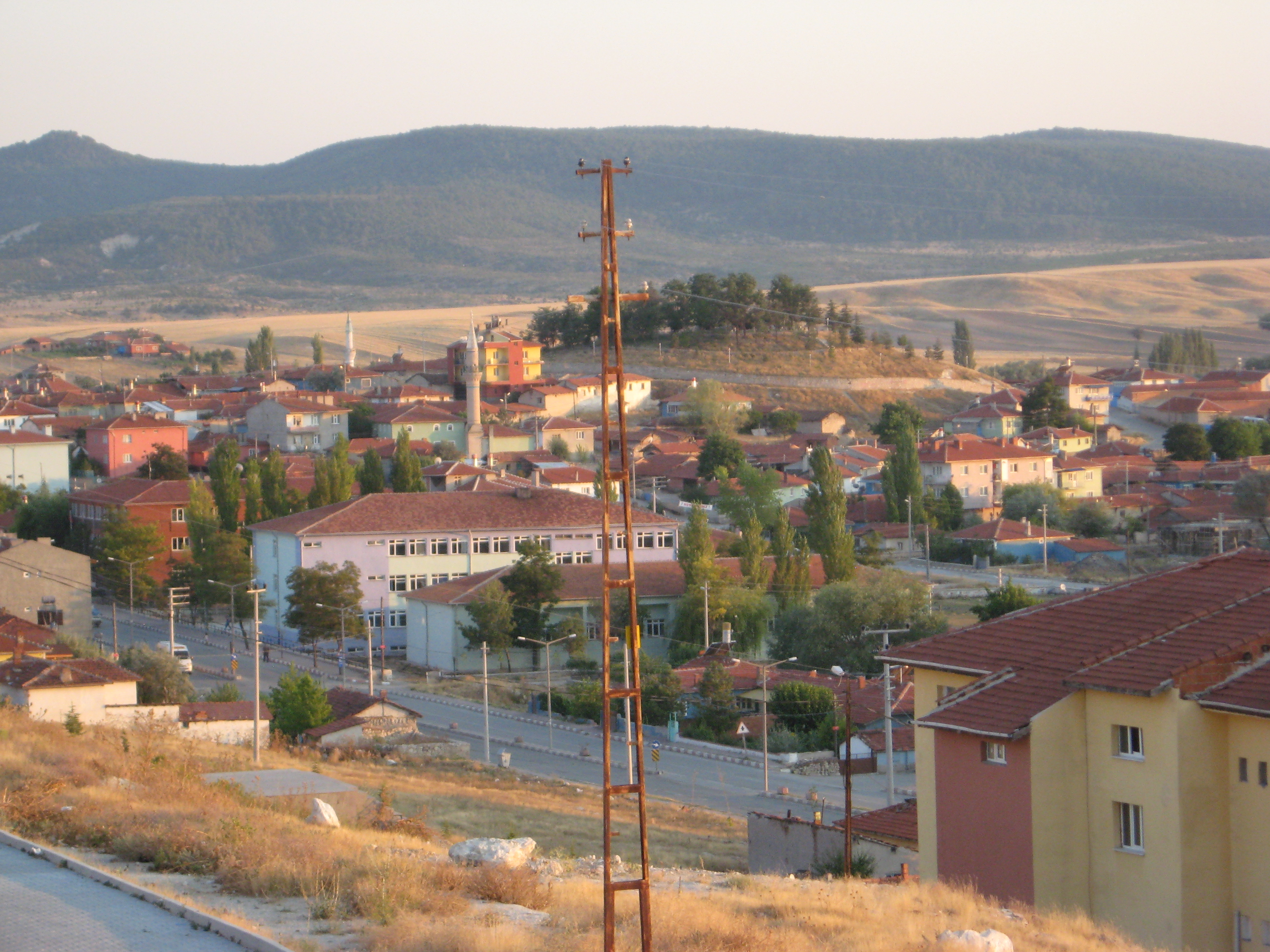
Kırka, Seyitgazi

Kırka is a neighbourhood of the municipality and district of Seyitgazi, Eskişehir Province, Turkey. Its population is 3,039 (2022). Before the 2013 reorganisation, it was a town (belde).

== Geography ==
Kırka is situated on the state highway D.665 in the plains of Central West Anatolia. Çatıörem dam reservoir is to the east of the town. The distance to Seyitgazi is 32 kilometres (20 mi) and to Eskişehir is 74 kilometres (46 mi).

== History ==
There are Phrygian ruins around Kırka. But Kırka was founded in 1634 during Ottoman Empire era. Inıtially it was a temporary settlement of Turkmen nomads in the pasture. But some of these nomads decided to settle. According to tradition the founders of Kırka were forty lords, hence it was named Kırka ("forty lords" in Turkish is kırk ağa). Kırka flourished as a market center of the area. In 1972 it was declared as a seat of township.

== Economy ==
The major town revenue is mining industry. Turkey is the major boron producer of the world and one of the most important ores is at 4 kilometres (2.5 mi) west of Kırka. After Boron products factory was opened in 1984, boron began to play a major role in town economy. Agriculture and cattle rising are among the other economic activities.
