= Tepebaşı, Eskişehir =

Tepebaşı
- District and municipality
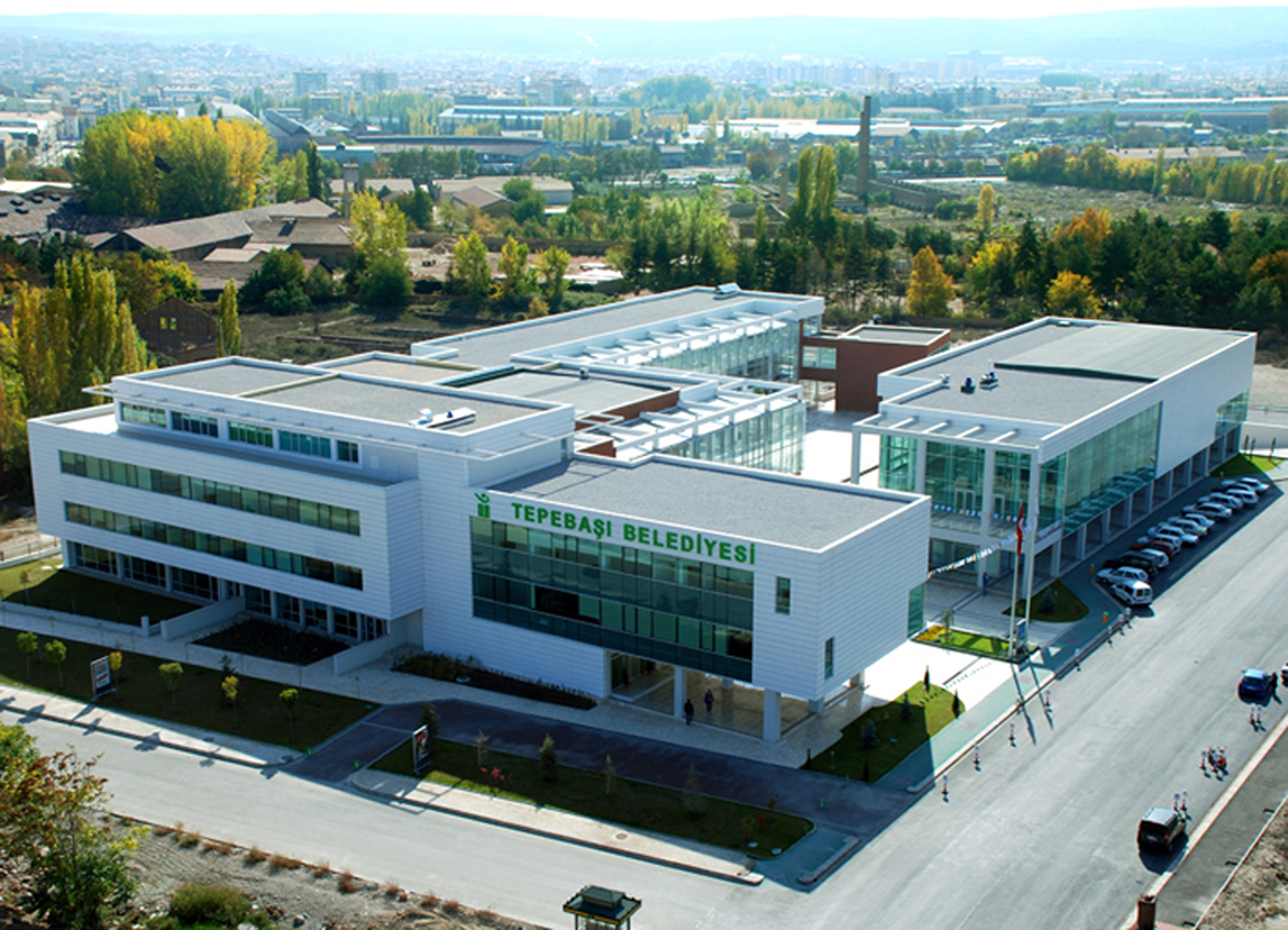
- Municipality building

- Logo

- Map showing Tepebaşı District in Eskişehir Province

- Location within Turkey Location within Turkey Central Anatolia
- Coordinates: 39°47′N 30°29′E
- Country: Turkey
- Province: Eskişehir

Government
  - Mayor: Ahmet Ataç (CHP)
- Area: 1,403 km^{2} (542 sq mi)
- Population (2022): 384,645
  - Density: 274.2/km^{2} (710.1/sq mi)
- Time zone: UTC+3 (TRT)
- Area code: 0222
- Website: www.tepebasi.bel.tr

Tepebaşı is a municipality and district of Eskişehir Province, Turkey. Its area is 1,403 km^{2}, and its population is 384,645 (2022), 42% of the provincial population. The Mayor of Tepebaşı is Ahmet Ataç.

== Geography ==
Tepebaşı District covers the northern part of Greater Eskişehir, and the adjacent countryside. It lies to the north of Porsuk River which flows through the center of Eskişehir.

== History ==
Up to 1993 Tepebaşı was a part of Eskişehir municipality. In 1993, the municipality of Tepebaşı was established within Eskişehir central district. In 2008 the district Tepebaşı was created from part of the former central district of Eskişehir, along with the district Odunpazarı. At the same time, the former municipalities Çukurhisar and Muttalip were absorbed into the municipality of Tepebaşı. At the 2013 Turkish local government reorganisation, the rural part of the district was integrated into the municipality, the villages becoming neighbourhoods.

== Living ==
Anadolu University, is the core of cultural activities. According to one survey, 31% of the urban residents are university graduates. Both Eskişehir Central Station and Eskişehir intercity bus terminal as well as the airbase are in Tepebaşı. There are also shopping centers and museums. In addition to education, the accommodation, health, entertainment and congress tourism are among the service sectors of the economy. Main industry around Tepebaşı include a locomotive factory (Tülomsaş) and a sugar refinery.

== Neighbourhoods ==
Neighbourhoods (Mahalle) are small administrative units within the municipalities, and are administered by the muhtar and the Neighborhood Seniors Council consisting of 4 members. Muhtar and the Senior Council are elected for 5 years at the local elections and are not affiliated with political parties. Neighborhoods are not an incorporation therefore do not hold government status. Muhtar, although being elected by the residents, acts merely as an administrator of the district governor. Muhtar can voice the neighborhood issues to the municipal hall together with the Seniors Council.

There are 92 neighbourhoods in Tepebaşı District:

- Ahılar
- Alınca
- Aşağı Söğütönü
- Aşağıkartal
- Atalan
- Atalantekke
- Avlamış
- Bahçelievler
- Batıkent
- Behçetiye
- Bektaşpınarı
- Beyazaltın
- Boyacıoğlu
- Bozdağ
- Buldukpınar
- Çalkara
- Çamlıca
- Çanakkıran
- Çukurhisar Yeni
- Cumhuriye
- Cumhuriyet
- Danişment
- Eğriöz
- Emirceoğlu
- Ertuğrulgazi
- Esentepe
- Eskibağlar
- Fatih
- Fevziçakmak
- Gazipaşa
- Gökçekısık
- Gökdere
- Güllük
- Gündüzler
- Hacı Ali Bey
- Hacı Seyit
- Hasanbey
- Hayriye
- Hekimdağ
- Hisar
- Hoşnudiye
- İhsaniye
- Işıklar
- Karaçobanpınarı
- Karadere
- Karagözler
- Kavacık
- Keskin
- Kızılcaören
- Kızılinler
- Kozkayı
- Kozlubel
- Kumlubel
- Mamure
- Merkez Yeni
- Mollaoğlu
- Musaözü
- Mustafa Kemal Paşa
- Muttalip Emirler
- Muttalip Koyunlar
- Muttalip Orta
- Nemli
- Ömerağa
- Sakintepe
- Şarhöyük
- Satılmışoğlu
- Sazova
- Şeker
- Şirintepe
- Sulukaraağaç
- Sütlüce
- Takmak
- Tandır
- Taycılar
- Tekeciler
- Tunalı
- Turgutlar
- Uludere
- Uluönder
- Yakakayı
- Yarımca
- Yaşamkent
- Yeniakçayır
- Yenibağlar
- Yeniincesu
- Yeşiltepe
- Yukarı Söğütönü
- Yukarıkartal
- Yürükakçayır
- Yusuflar
- Zafer
- Zincirlikuyu
