= Mahmudiye =

- District and municipality
- Map showing Mahmudiye District in Eskişehir Province

- Location in Turkey Mahmudiye (Turkey Central Anatolia)
- Coordinates: 39°29′52″N 30°59′14″E
- Country: Turkey
- Province: Eskişehir

Government
  - Mayor: İshak Gündoğan (CHP)
- Area: 659 km^{2} (254 sq mi)
- Elevation: 877 m (2,877 ft)
- Population (2022): 7,575
  - Density: 11.5/km^{2} (29.8/sq mi)
- Time zone: UTC+3 (TRT)
- Postal code: 26800
- Area code: 0222

Mahmudiye is a municipality and district of Eskişehir Province, Turkey. Its area is 659 km^{2}, and its population is 7,575 (2022). The town lies at an elevation of 877 m (2,877 ft).

== History ==
From 1867 until 1922, Mahmudiye was part of Hüdavendigâr vilayet. The origins of Mahmudiye date back to 3000 BC. The archaeological remains in the district confirm this history. In the early 1800s, Abdullah, the prominent figure in the region, is known to have founded Mahmudiye. During the Ottoman period, this area became the first modern stud farm of the Ottoman Empire, called Çiftlikat-ı Hümayun.

== Composition ==
There are 19 neighbourhoods in Mahmudiye District:

- Akyurt
- Balçıkhisar
- Çal
- Doğanca
- Fahriye
- Güllüce
- Hamidiye
- Işıklar
- İsmetpaşa
- Kaymazyayla
- Mesudiye
- Orta
- Şerefiye
- Tokathan
- Topkaya
- Türkmenmecidiye
- Yeni
- Yeniköy
- Yeşilyurt
