= Seyitgazi =

- District and municipality
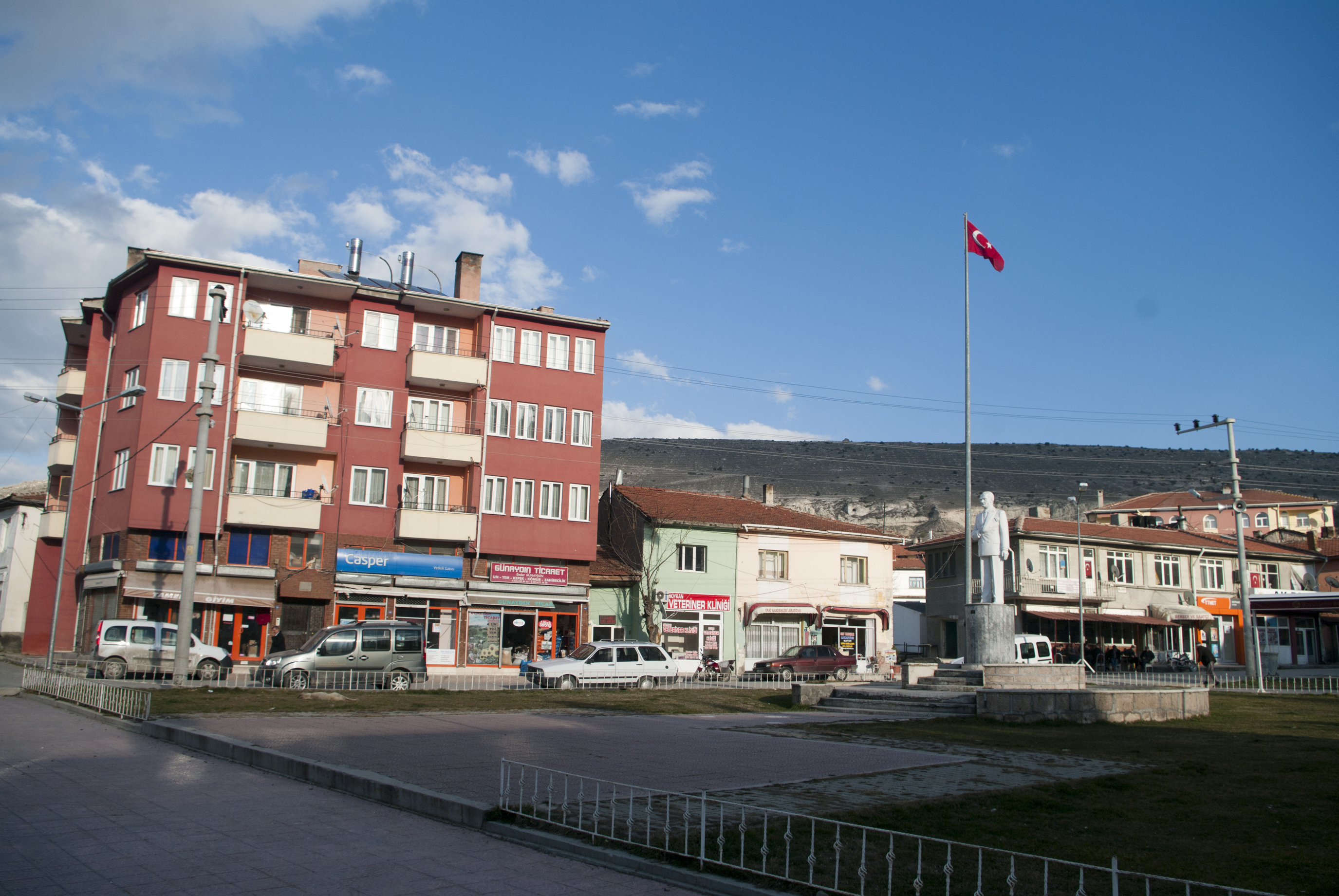

- Logo

- Map showing Seyitgazi District in Eskişehir Province

- Location within Turkey Location within Turkey Central Anatolia
- Coordinates: 39°26′44″N 30°41′38″E
- Country: Turkey
- Province: Eskişehir

Government
  - Mayor: Uğur Tepe (CHP)
- Area: 1,578 km^{2} (609 sq mi)
- Elevation: 990 m (3,250 ft)
- Population (2022): 12,587
  - Density: 7.977/km^{2} (20.66/sq mi)
- Time zone: UTC+3 (TRT)
- Postal code: 26950
- Area code: 0222
- Website: www.seyitgazi.bel.tr

Seyitgazi is a municipality and district of Eskişehir Province, Turkey. Its area is 1,578 km^{2}, and its population is 12,587 (2022). The central town of Seyitgazi lies at a distance of 43 km (27 mi) towards the south from the province capital of Eskişehir. The town was known formerly as Nakoleia.

== History ==
The town occupies the site of the Byzantine city of Nakoleia which is attested from Roman times.

After the town was conquered by the Seljuk Turks, it was known as Kala'-i-Mashihya, the Christian Castle. During that time the old monastic centre dedicated to the archangel Michael was converted into a shrine to the 8th-century Muslim saint (seyyid) and warrior Battal Gazi, who allegedly fell in a battle nearby in 740. The town was eventually renamed after Battal Gazi.

From 1867 until 1922, Seyitgazi was part of Hüdavendigâr vilayet.

== Places of interest ==
A complex (Turkish: külliye) dedicated to Battal Gazi and containing his tomb, a mosque, a medrese, cells and ceremonial rooms for dervishes as well as charitable services for the community such as kitchens and a bakery were built in 1208 on a hill overlooking the town by Ümmühan Hatun, wife of the Seljuk sultan Gıyaseddin Keyhüsrev I and further extended in 1511 by the Ottoman sultan Bayezid II. The shrine and the adjoining complex remain popular with local as well as foreign visitors.

== Archaeological discoveries ==
In August 2019, researchers headed by Prof. Murat Türkteki announced the discovery of two skeletons dating back about 5,000 years in the same sarcophagus in Early Bronze Age settlement Küllüoba. Excavators assumed that one of the skeletons was a 13-year-old girl and other was a man in his late 30s.

In August 2020, archaeologists headed by Prof. Murat Türktaki revealed a 5,000-year-old paint palette made of stone in the Seyitgazi district at the Küllüoba site. According to Türktaki, this palette was used for painting dishes.

In March 2021, construction workers found a marble sarcophagus which is 1.5 meters long and 33 centimetres wide in the Seyitgazi district at the Küllüoba site.

== Composition ==
There are 51 neighbourhoods in Seyitgazi District:

- Akin
- Aksaklı
- Aşağısöğüt
- Aslanbeyli
- Ayvalı
- Bardakçı
- Beşsaray
- Beykışla
- Büyükdere
- Büyükyayla
- Çatören
- Cevizli
- Çukurağıl
- Çukurca
- Çürüttüm
- Değişören
- Derebenek
- Doğançayır
- Fethiye
- Gemiç
- Göcenoluk
- Gökbahçe
- Gökçegüney
- Göknebi
- Gümüşbel
- İdrisyayla
- İkiçeşme
- İkizoluk
- Karacalık
- Karaören
- Kesenler
- Kırka
- Kümbet
- Numanoluk
- Örencik
- Oynaş
- Salihler
- Sancar
- Sandıközü
- Sarayören
- Sarıcailyas
- Şükranlı
- Taşlıkköy
- Üçsaray
- Yapıldak
- Yarbasan
- Yazıdere
- Yenikent
- Yeşiltepe
- Yukarısöğüt
- Yunus
