= Eskişehir Province =

Province of Turkey

Coordinates: 39°39′31″N 31°02′13″E

Eskişehir Province Eskişehir ili
- Province and metropolitan municipality
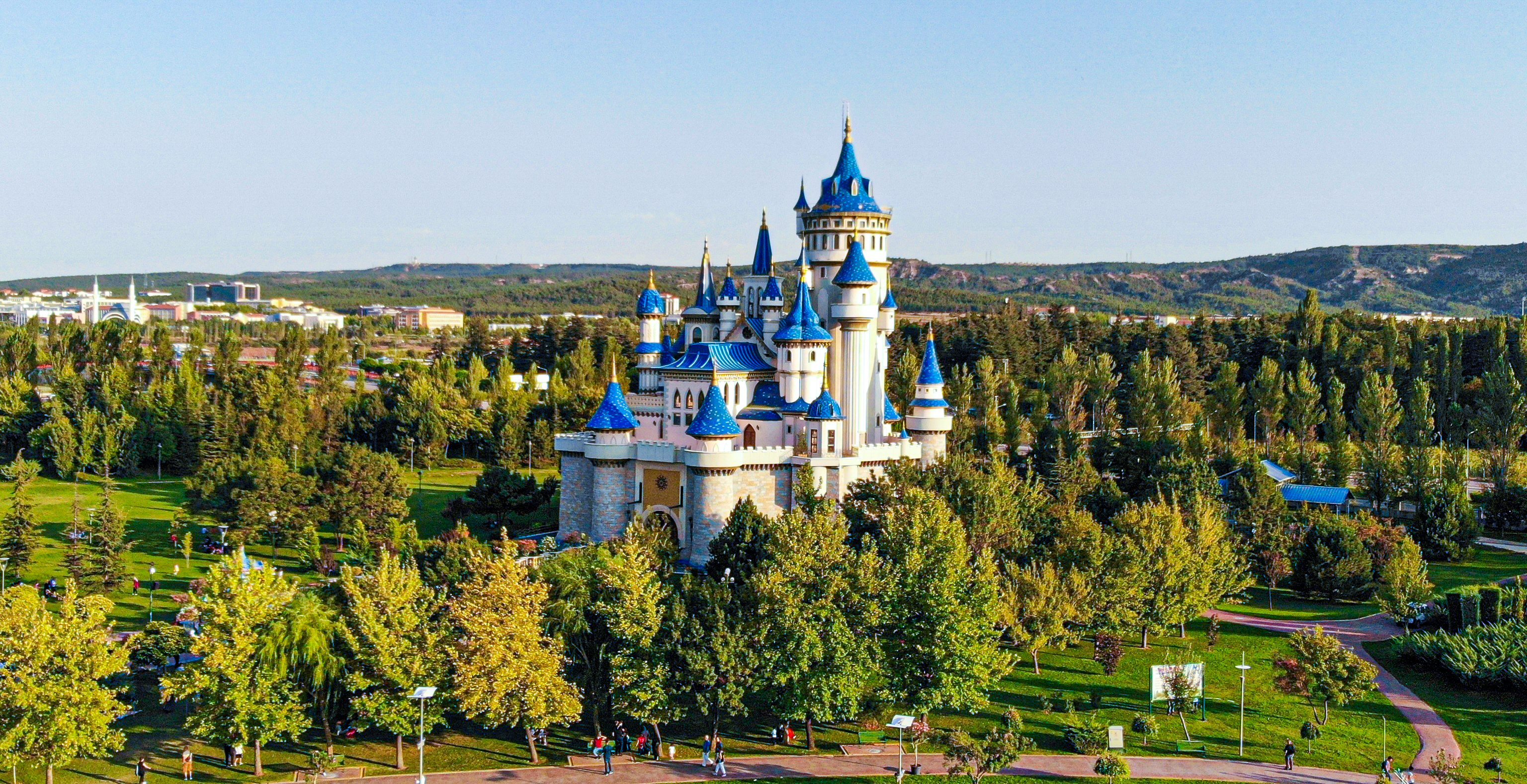
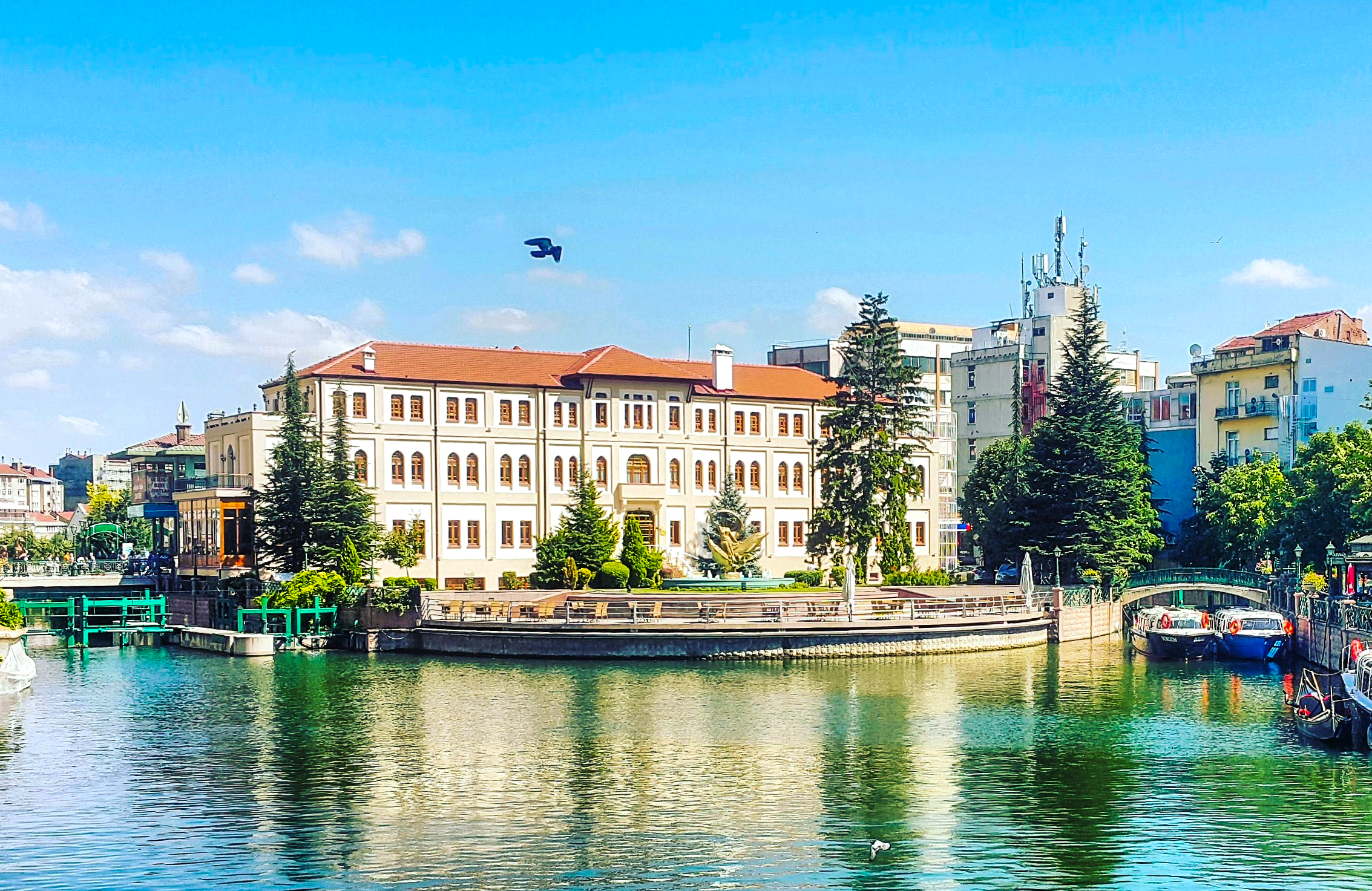
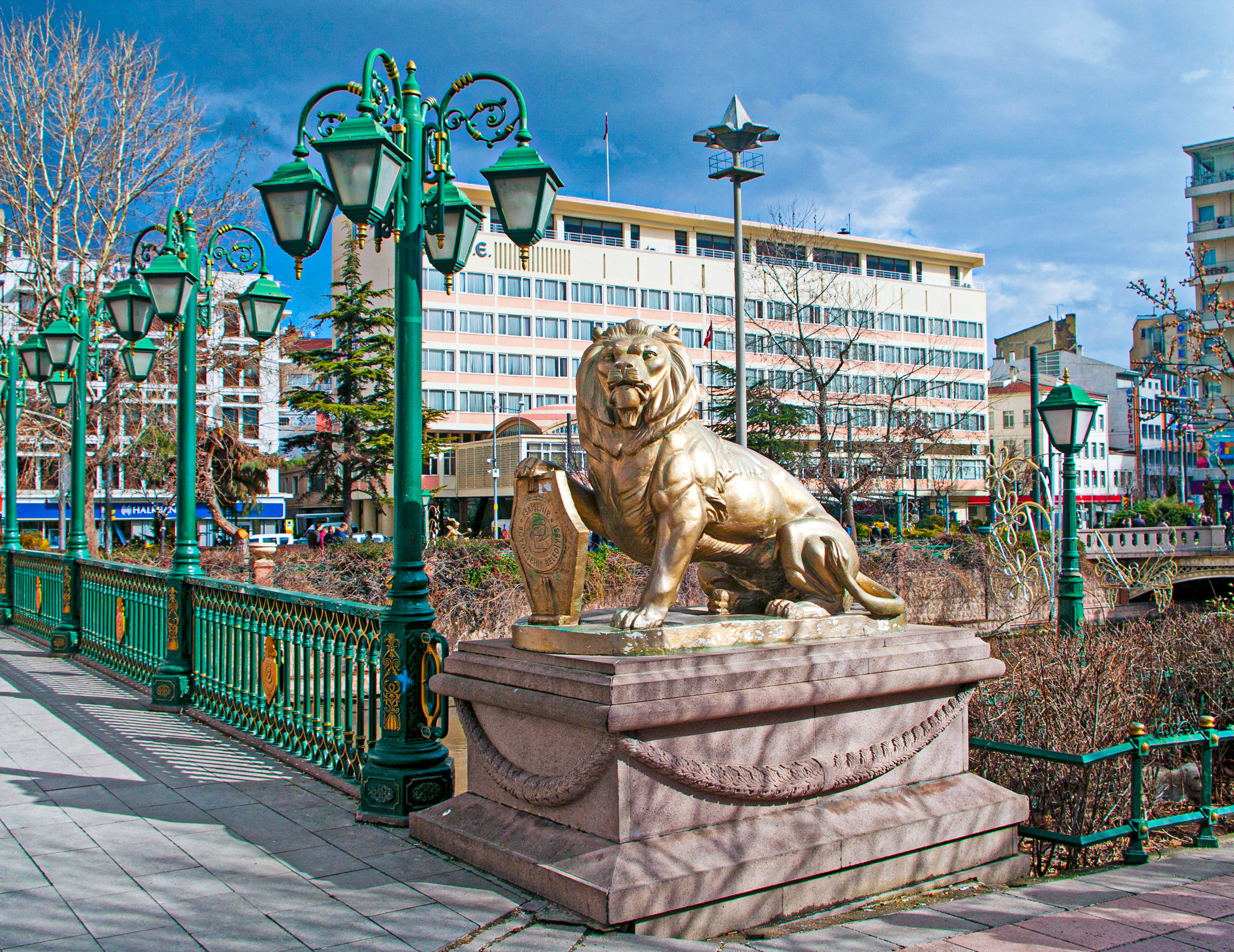
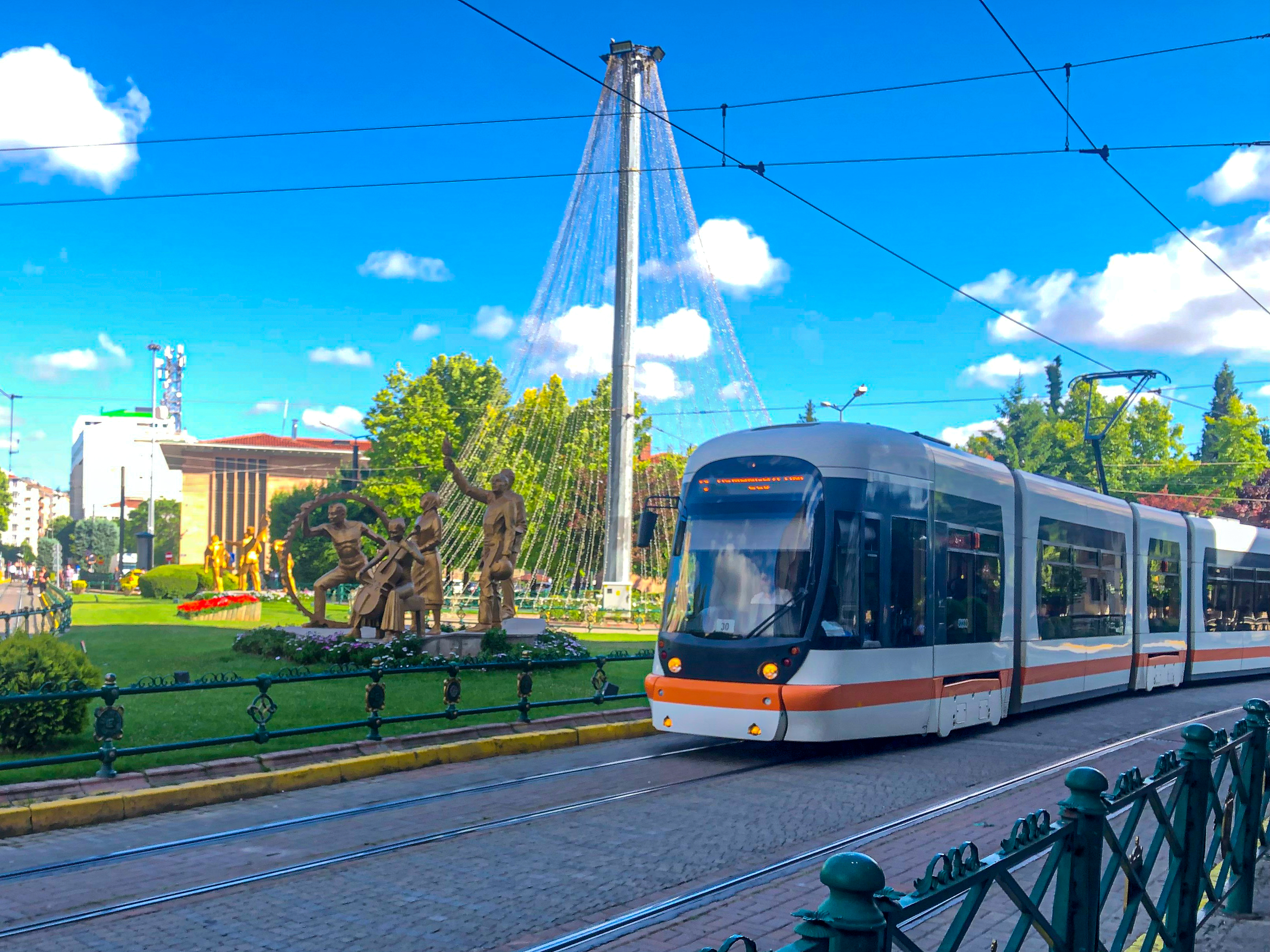
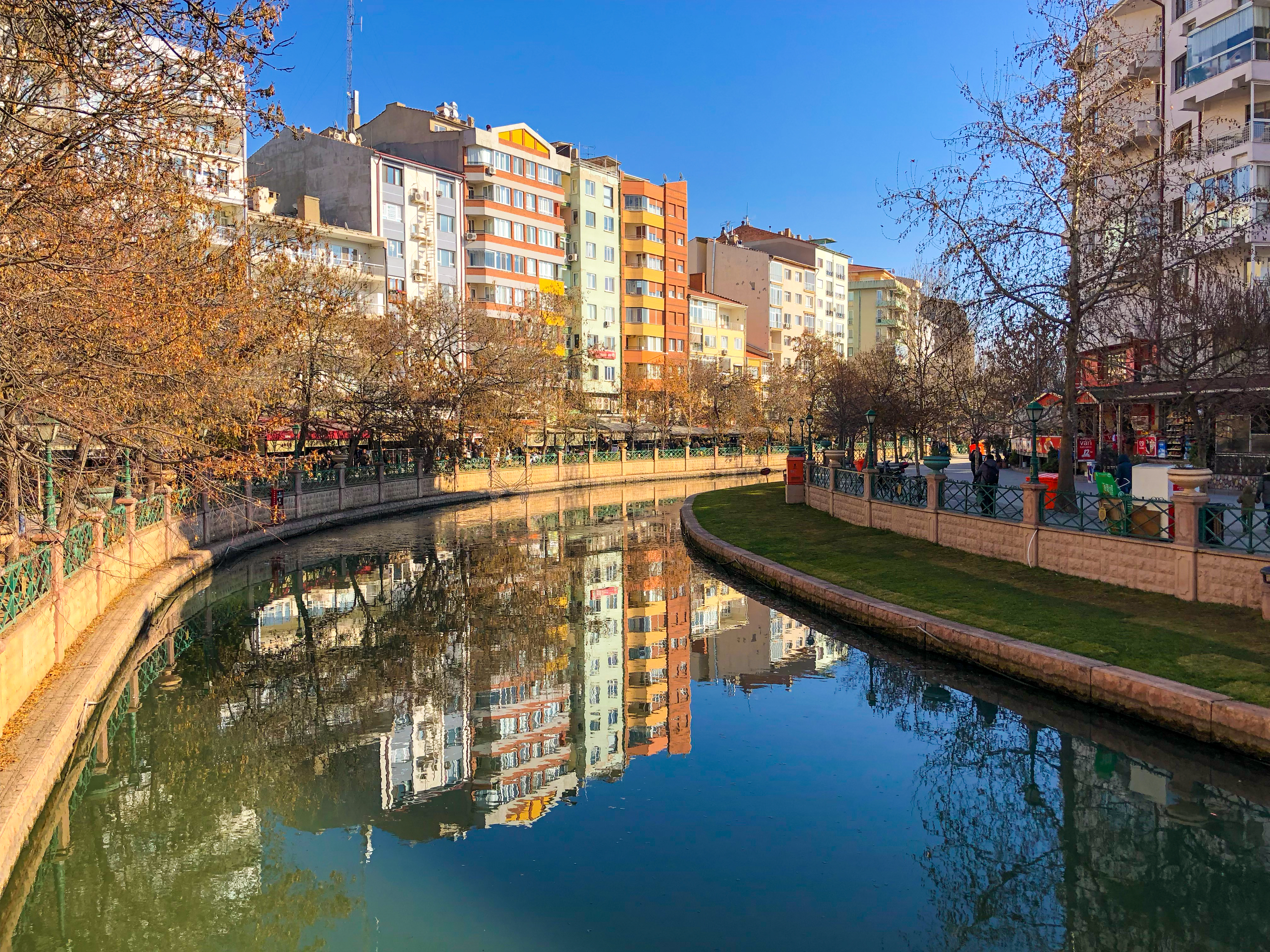
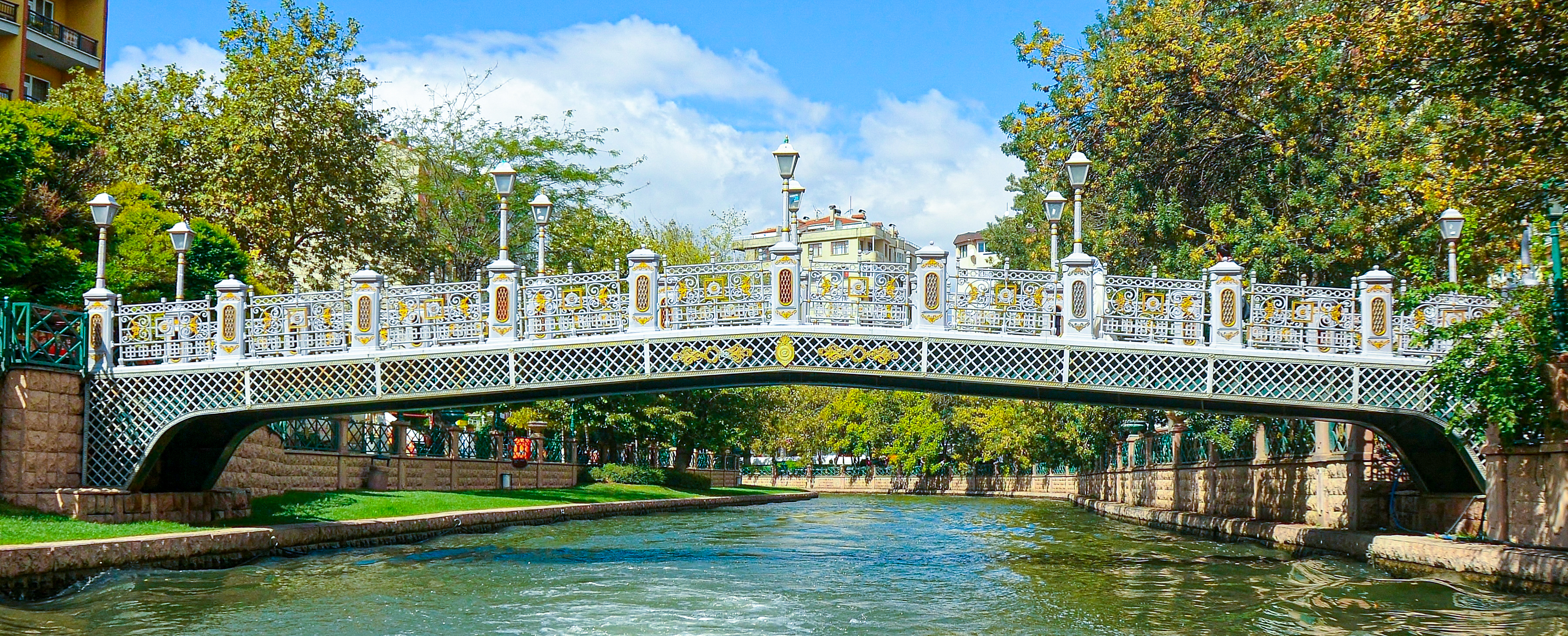

- Location of the province within Turkey
- Country: Turkey
- Seat: Eskişehir

Government
  - Mayor: Ayşe Ünlüce (CHP)
  - Vali: Erdinç Yılmaz
- Area: 13,960 km^{2} (5,390 sq mi)
- Population (2022): 906,617
  - Density: 64.94/km^{2} (168.2/sq mi)
- Time zone: UTC+3 (TRT)
- Area code: 0222
- Website: www.eskisehir.bel.tr www.eskisehir.gov.tr

Eskişehir Province (Turkish: Eskişehir ili) is a province and metropolitan municipality in northwestern Turkey. Its area is 13,960 km^{2}, and its population is 906,617 (2022). Its adjacent provinces are Bilecik to the northwest, Kütahya to the west, Afyon to the southwest, Konya to the south, Ankara to the east, and Bolu to the north. The provincial capital is Eskişehir. Most of the province is laid down in Central Anatolia Region. Northern parts of Mihalıççık district and ones of Mihalgazi and Sarıcakaya are located in the Black Sea Region and one of them belong to the Aegean Region.

Eskişehir is an old and culturally developed province of Turkey. Eskişehir has 3 universities, Eskişehir Osmangazi University, Eskişehir Technical University and Anadolu University, which is the largest university in Turkey and which has some branch offices in Europe.

== Geography ==
Köppen map of Eskişehir Province and surrounding regions:
- BSk
- Dsb

Eskişehir has a cold semi-arid steppe climate (BSk) according to Köppen climate classification. It features warm to hot dry summers and cold to freezing winters.

== Districts ==
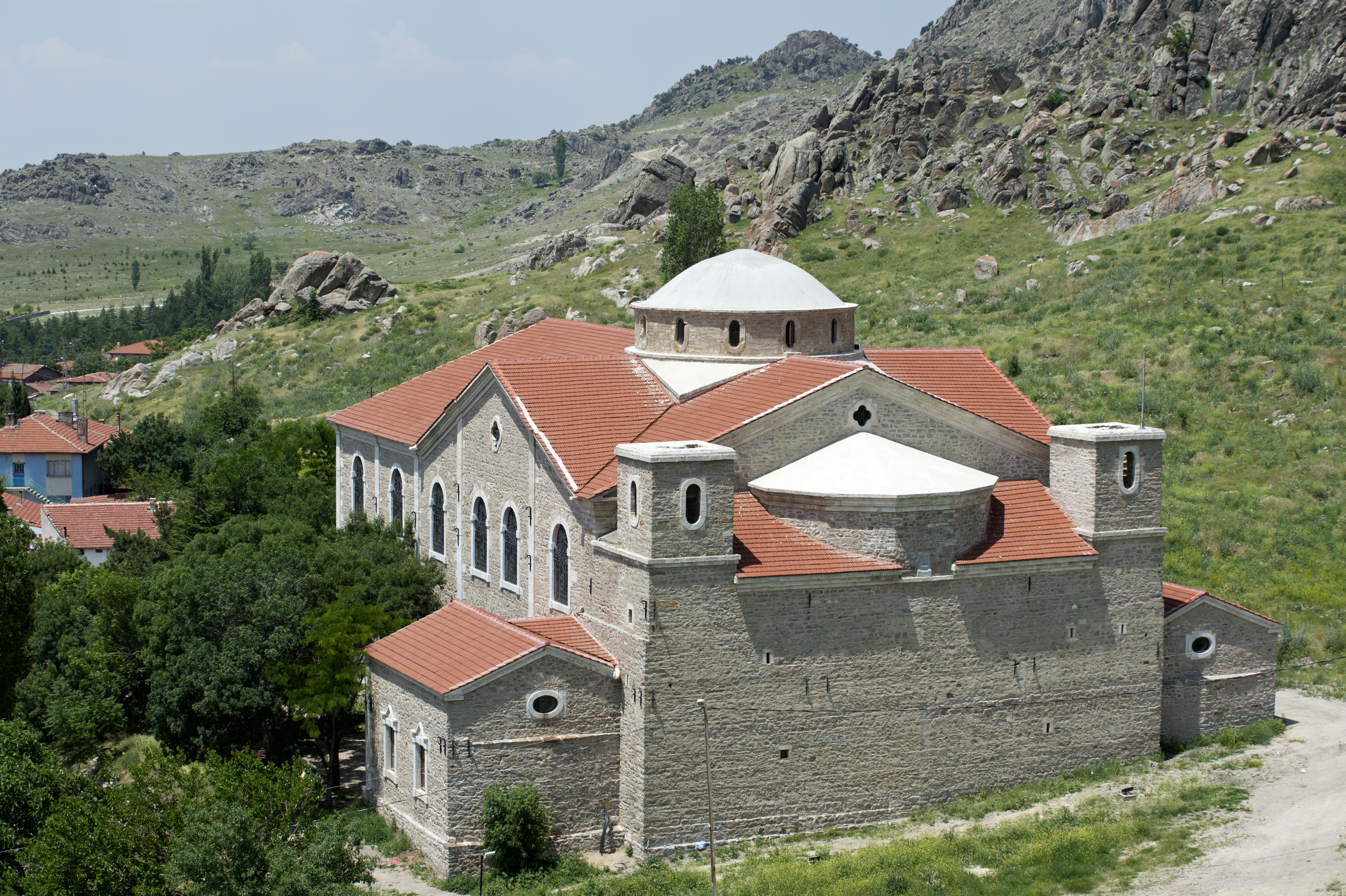
Sivrihisar Holy Trinity Church in Sivrihisar.

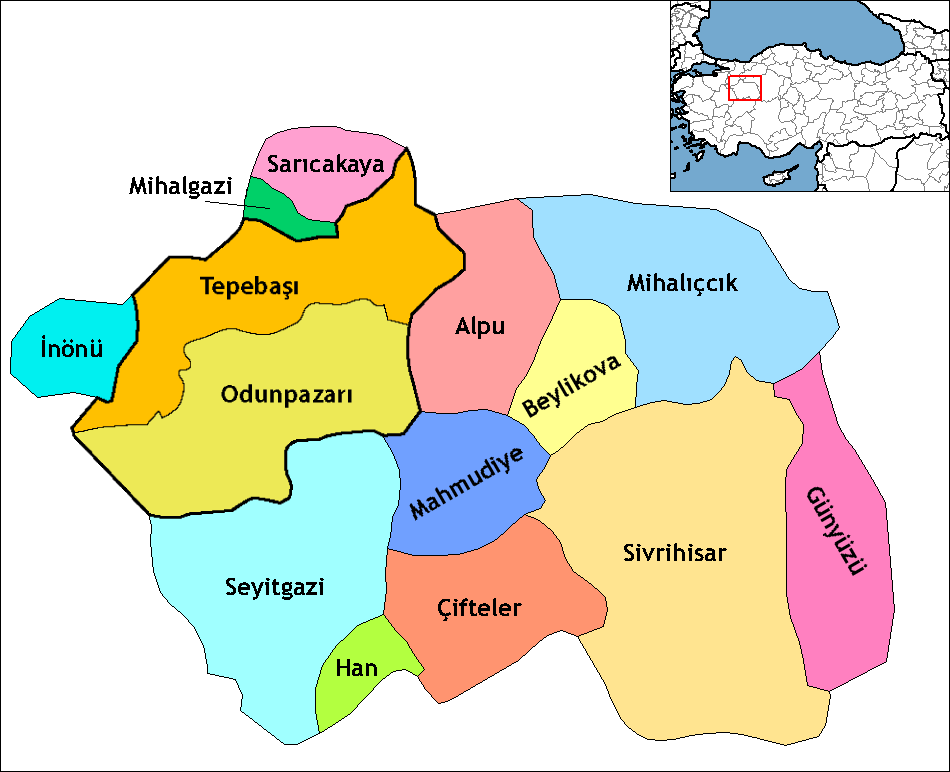
Districts of the Eskişehir Province

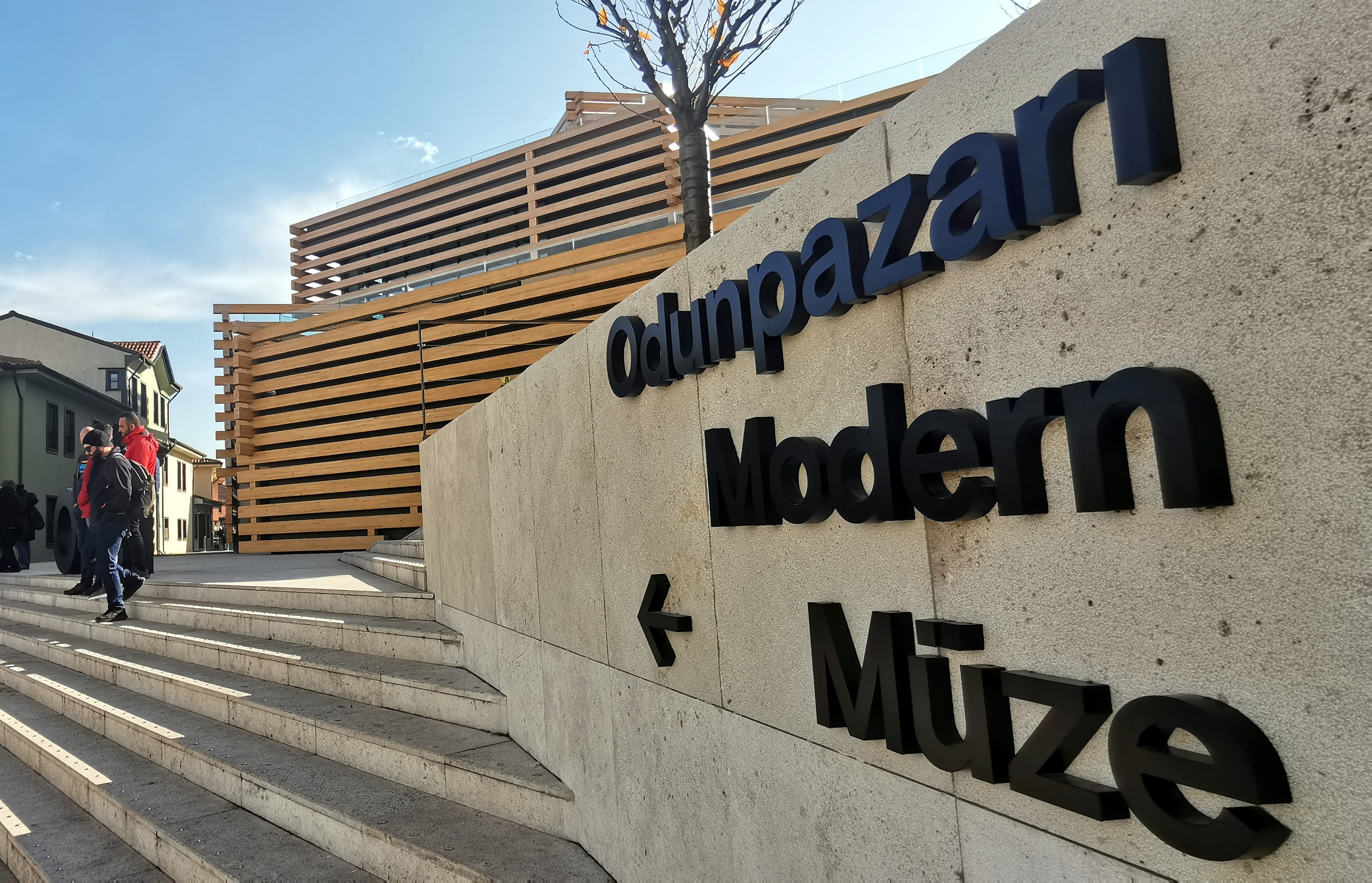
Eskişehir is the capital of the province.

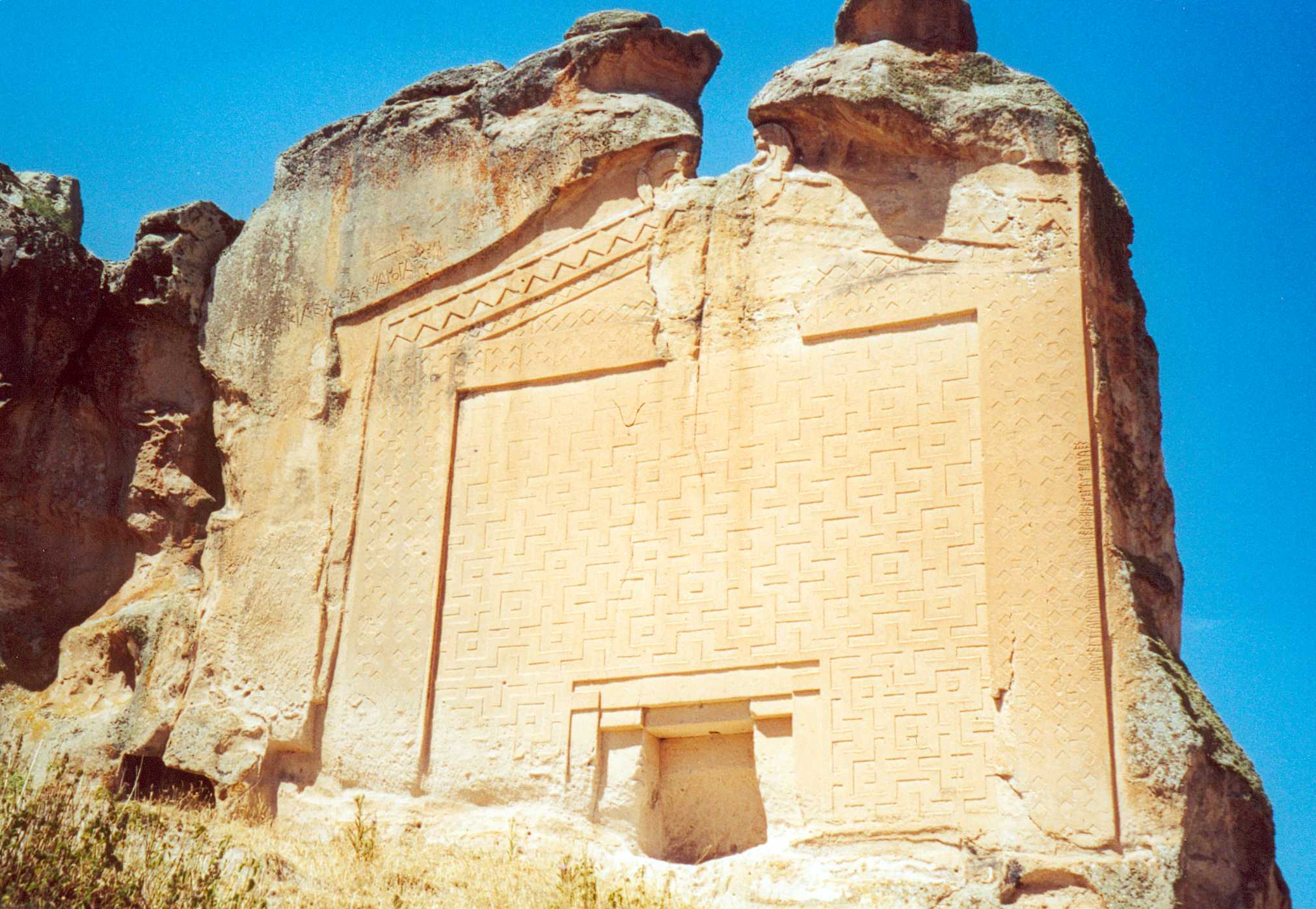
Midas Tomb in Yazılıkaya, Eskişehir

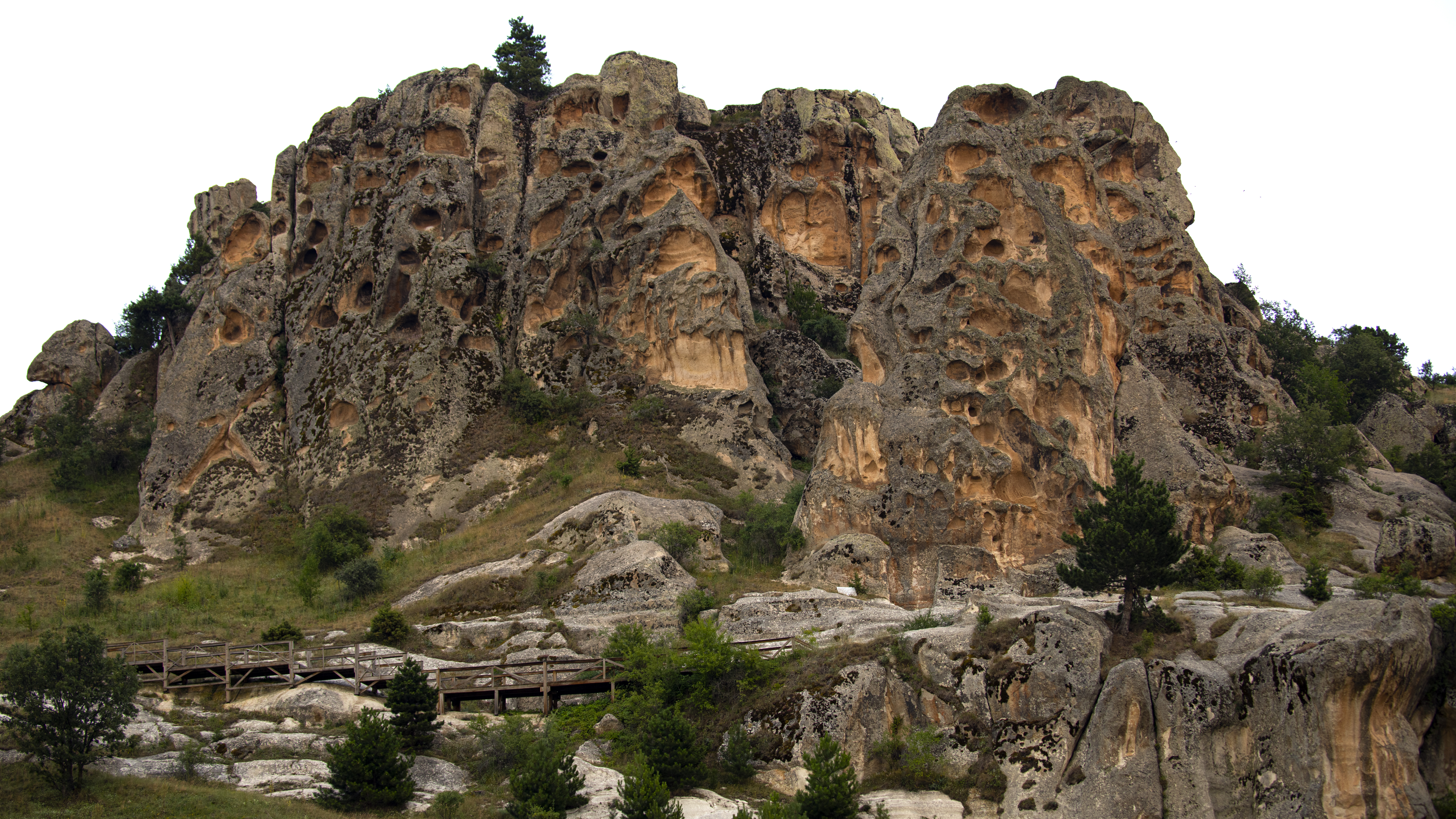
Fairy chimney like rock formations in Yazılıkaya, Eskişehir.

Eskişehir Province is divided into 14 districts:

- Alpu
- Beylikova
- Çifteler
- Günyüzü
- Han
- İnönü
- Mahmudiye
- Mihalgazi
- Mihalıççık
- Odunpazarı
- Sarıcakaya
- Seyitgazi
- Sivrihisar
- Tepebaşı

== Demographics ==
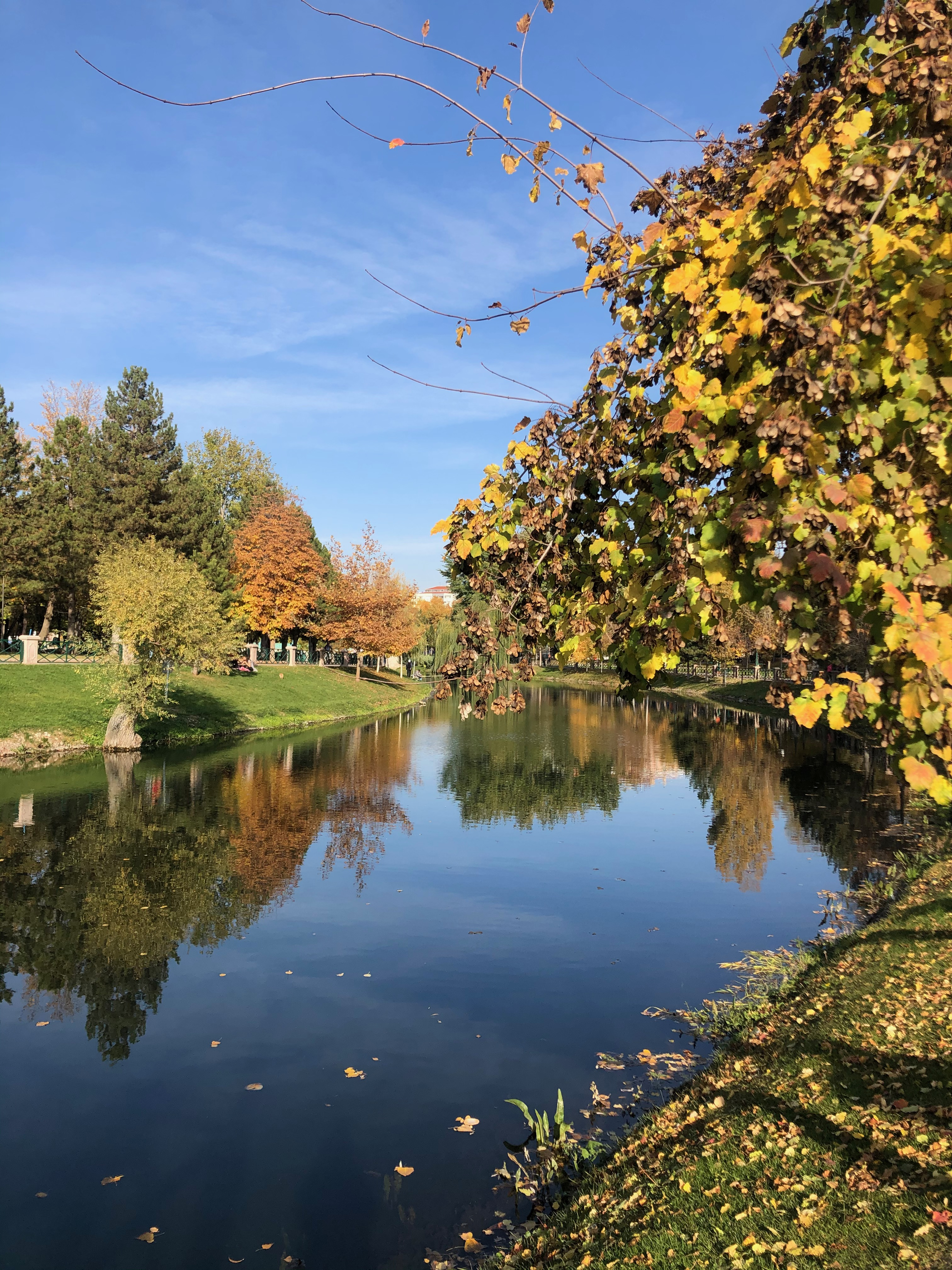
Porsuk River in Kanlikavak Park.

Eskişehir's population has a high literacy level of 99%. Many universities and military installations are located in and around the city. Turkish technical students are concentrated in the Eskişehir universities. Infrastructural problems have been partially solved in 2004 with the construction of a tram system.

Eskisehir, and neighboring cities were the major settlement area for the descendants of the founders of the Ottoman Empire, about 1000 years ago. Many villages in the province carry the names of the Turkish tribes/clans from those times. Some people in the city of Eskişehir trace their family origin back to Crimea and the Caucasus. There are also descendants of Turkish immigrants from the Balkans fleeing war and persecution.

Historical population
Year	Pop.	±% p.a.
1927	154,195	—
1940	206,794	+2.28%
1950	276,164	+2.93%
1960	368,827	+2.94%
1970	459,367	+2.22%
1980	543,802	+1.70%
1990	641,057	+1.66%
2000	706,009	+0.97%
2010	764,584	+0.80%
2018	871,187	+1.64%

== Meerschaum ==
Eskişehir is internationally known as the source of Meerschaum, a white foamy stone which is used for making smoking pipes with detailed carvings. The stone is called lületaşı in Turkish.

== Archaeological discoveries ==
In August 2019, researchers head by Prof. Murat Türkteki announced the discovery of two skeletons dating back about 5,000 years in the same sarcophagus in Early Bronze Age settlement Küllüoba. Excavators assumed that one of the skeletons was a 13-year-old girl and other was a man in his late 30s.

In August 2020, archaeologists head by Prof. Murat Türktaki revealed a 5,000-year-old paint palette made of stone in the Seyitgazi district at the Küllüoba site. According to Türktaki, this palette was used for painting dishes.

In March 2021, the discovery of the marble sarcophagus which is 1.5 metres (4 ft 11 in) tall and 33 centimetres (13 in) wide in the Seyitgazi district at the Küllüoba site was announced by the municipal workers while construction work.

== See also ==
- List of populated places in Eskişehir Province
- Monument of Sivrihisar Airplane
