= List of municipalities in Kütahya Province =

This is the list of municipalities in Kütahya Province, Turkey, as of March 2023.

| District | Municipality |
|---|---|
| Altıntaş | Altıntaş |
| Aslanapa | Aslanapa |
| Çavdarhisar | Çavdarhisar |
| Domaniç | Çukurca |
| Domaniç | Domaniç |
| Dumlupınar | Dumlupınar |
| Emet | Emet |
| Gediz | Eskigediz |
| Gediz | Gediz |
| Gediz | Gökler |
| Gediz | Yenikent |
| Hisarcık | Hisarcık |
| Kütahya | Kütahya |
| Kütahya | Seyitömer |
| Pazarlar | Pazarlar |
| Şaphane | Şaphane |
| Simav | Akdağ |
| Simav | Çitgöl |
| Simav | Demirci |
| Simav | Güney |
| Simav | Kuşu |
| Simav | Naşa |
| Simav | Simav |
| Tavşanlı | Balıköy |
| Tavşanlı | Kuruçay |
| Tavşanlı | Tavşanlı |
| Tavşanlı | Tepecik |
| Tavşanlı | Tunçbilek |
