= Simav (disambiguation) =

Simav may refer to:

- Simav, a town in Kütahya Province, Aegean region, Turkey
- Simav District, a district of the Kütahya Province, Turkey
- Simav Graben, a graben around the town of Simav
- Simav River, a river in Anatolia, Turkey
