= Ömerler =

Ömerler may refer to the following places in Turkey:

== Communities ==
- Ömerler, Bolu, a village in Bolu Province
- Ömerler, Karpuzlu, a neighbourhood in Aydın Province
- Ömerler, Kurucaşile, a village in Bartın Province
- Ömerler, Polatlı, a neighbourhood in Ankara Province

== Other ==
- Ömerler coal mine, in Kütahya Province
