= Simav District =

District of Kütahya Province, Turkey

- District
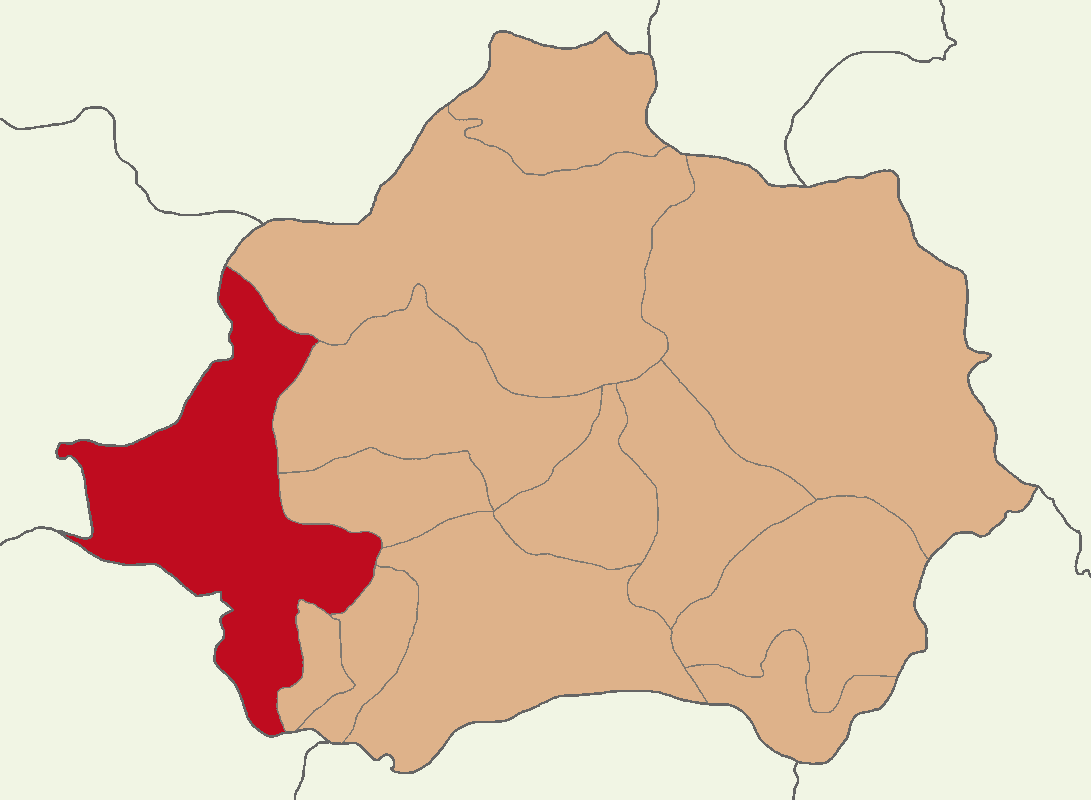
- Map showing Simav District in Kütahya Province

- Location in Turkey Simav District (Turkey Aegean)
- Coordinates: 39°05′N 28°59′E
- Country: Turkey
- Province: Kütahya
- Seat: Simav

Government
  - Kaymakam: Bünyamin Karaloğlu
- Area: 1,515 km^{2} (585 sq mi)
- Population (2022): 61,265
  - Density: 40/km^{2} (100/sq mi)
- Time zone: UTC+3 (TRT)
- Website: www.simav.gov.tr

Simav District is a district of the Kütahya Province of Turkey. Its seat is the town of Simav. Its area is 1,515 km^{2}, and its population is 61,265 (2022).

== Composition ==
There are 7 municipalities in Simav District:

- Akdağ
- Çitgöl
- Demirci
- Güney
- Kuşu
- Naşa
- Simav

There are 83 villages in Simav District:

- Ahlatlıçeşme
- Ahmetli
- Akpınar
- Aksaz
- Aşağıdolaylar
- Bademli
- Bahtıllı
- Başkonak
- Beciler
- Bedirler
- Beyce
- Boğazköy
- Çakırlar
- Çamlık
- Çınarlıdere
- Çulhalar
- Dereköy
- Dereyüzüdere
- Efir
- Eğdemir
- Eğirler
- Esenbağ
- Evciler
- Gılmanlar
- Gökçeler
- Gölköy
- Gümüşsu
- Güzelyurt
- Hacıhüseyinefendi
- Hasanören
- Hıdırdivanı
- Hisarbey
- Ihlamur
- İmranlar
- İnkaya
- İnlice
- Kalkan
- Kapıkaya
- Karacahisar
- Karacaören
- Karakoca
- Karapınar
- Kayaışık
- Kayalıdere
- Kestel
- Kiçir
- Kızılcık
- Köseler
- Koyunoba
- Külcü
- Küplüce
- Kurduman
- Kusumlar
- Maden
- Mamak
- Örencik
- Örenli
- Ortacı
- Pulluca
- Samat
- Sarıçam
- Sarıkaya
- Sarkatlar
- Şenköy
- Söğüt
- Sudöşeği
- Sünnetçiler
- Taşköy
- Taşlık
- Toklar
- Yağıllar
- Yağmurlar
- Yassıeynihan
- Yavu
- Yaykın
- Yemişli
- Yeniköy
- Yeniler
- Yeşilçam
- Yeşildere
- Yeşilköy
- Yeşilyayla
- Yukarıdolaylar

== Geography ==
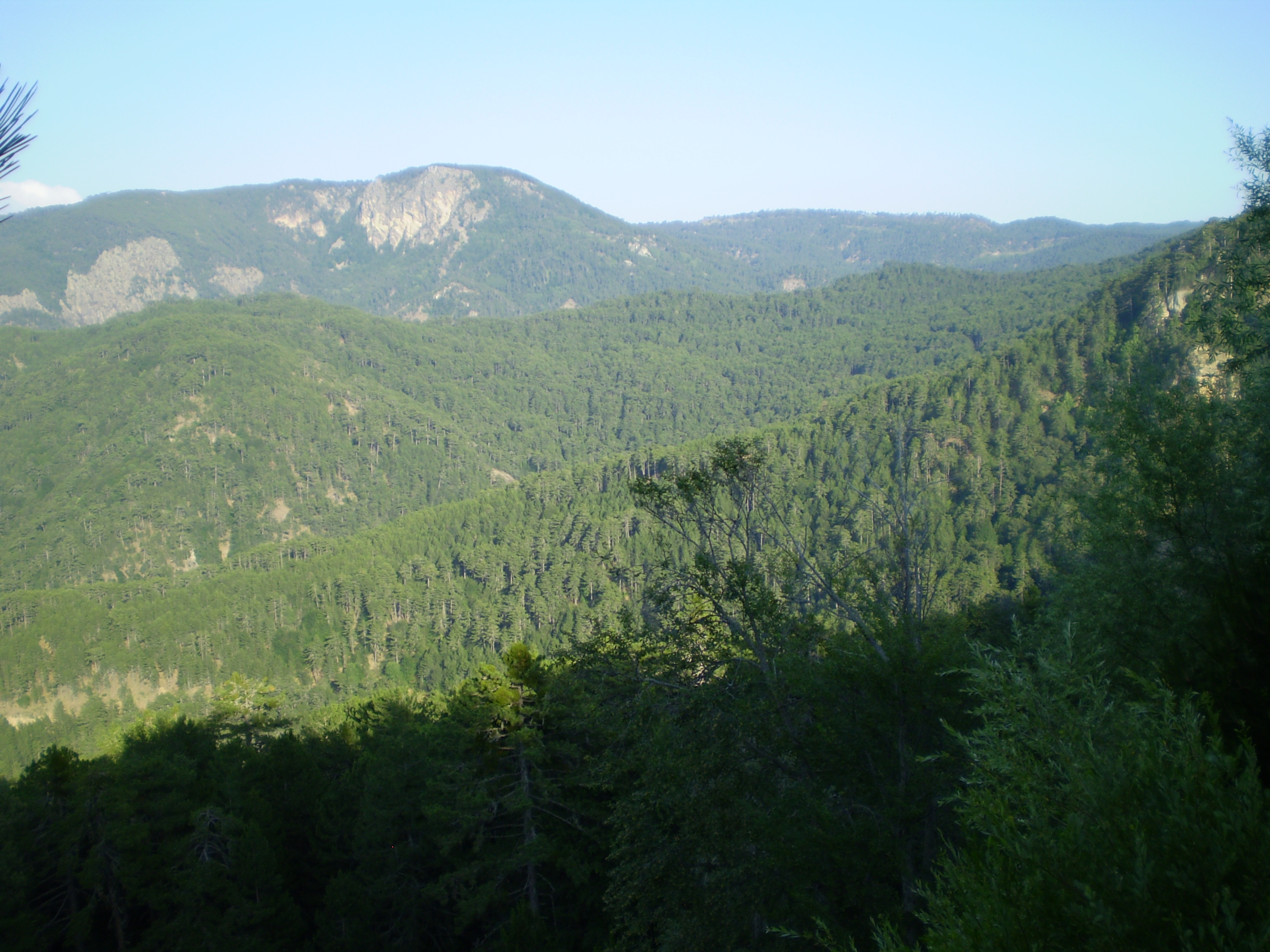
Simav mountains, viewed from the Simav-Demirci road

The Simav plain covers an area of 70 km². To the south of the plain is Simav Mountain, which reaches a height of 1,780 m. A steep escarpment marks the transition from the plain to the mountain. To the north of the plain is the Akdağ mountain, which is not as tall as Simav Mountain.

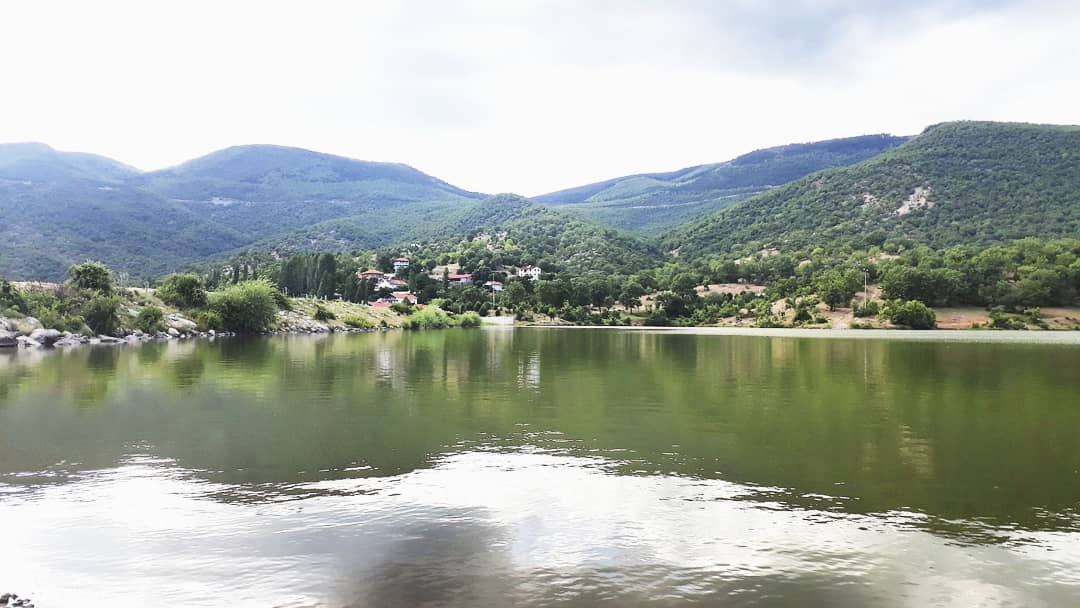
Akdağ mountain, viewed from the village of Efir

The Simav River runs along the north side of the plain. Lake Simav also used to be in the plain, but it was drained in 1959.

The Simav geothermal field is located in the northeastern part of the Simav plain, about 4 km north of Simav. There are 14 major hot springs in this region: 10 in the area around Çitgöl and Naşa and 4 in the Eynal area. (There are also many minor hot springs; the overall total is 89: 34 in the Eynal area and 55 in the Çitgöl-Naşa area.) The waters in these springs are carbonated and, like most geothermal water in Anatolia, have sodium bicarbonate as the predominant dissolved compound. The hot springs in the Simav area are also fairly rich in sulfate, which is mostly derived from alunite in the area around Şaphane, 20 km to the east; hot springs in that area leach the sulfate out of the rocks and introduce them into the water system.

=== Geology ===
Geologically speaking, the Simav plain forms a graben relative to the Simav Mountain and Akdağ horsts. The lowest rock strata consist of Paleozoic metamorphic rocks, which are exposed in many outcrops in the mountains. In the graben, these metamorphic rocks are overlain by younger sedimentary rocks. At least in the mountains, the metamorphic rocks are overlain by lower Mesozoic rocks, including Jurassic carbonates. Above this is a layer of "volcanic rocks and lake sediments" from the Miocene era. This layer is exposed in the mountains both north and south of the plain; it was also deposited in the graben as well. Several younger formations are above these rocks. Extensional tectonics after the Miocene – probably during the Pliocene – produced the current graben-and-horst structure, with the graben (today's plain) being formed as a pull-apart basin. Finally, today's plain is covered by a thick layer of alluvium, several hundred meters deep.

The escarpment between the plain and Simav Mountain follows the Simav fault, which runs for about 80 km from east to west from Düvertepe to Şaphane. The Simav fault is very deep – it has a slip of over 1,000 m – and this allows heat to rise from deeper in the earth's crust, which forms the hot springs in the area. While the Simav fault marks the southern edge of the graben, there are also a couple of extensional faults in the northern part of the graben, such as the Eynal and Naşa faults.

== Economy ==
The economy of Simav district includes geothermal tourism around the springs at Simav, Çitgöl, and Naşa; greenhouse cultivation; animal husbandry; lumbering; and mining. The manufacturing and service sectors are not as robust.

=== Agriculture ===
Overall, agriculture and animal husbandry employ more people than any other sector in Simav district.

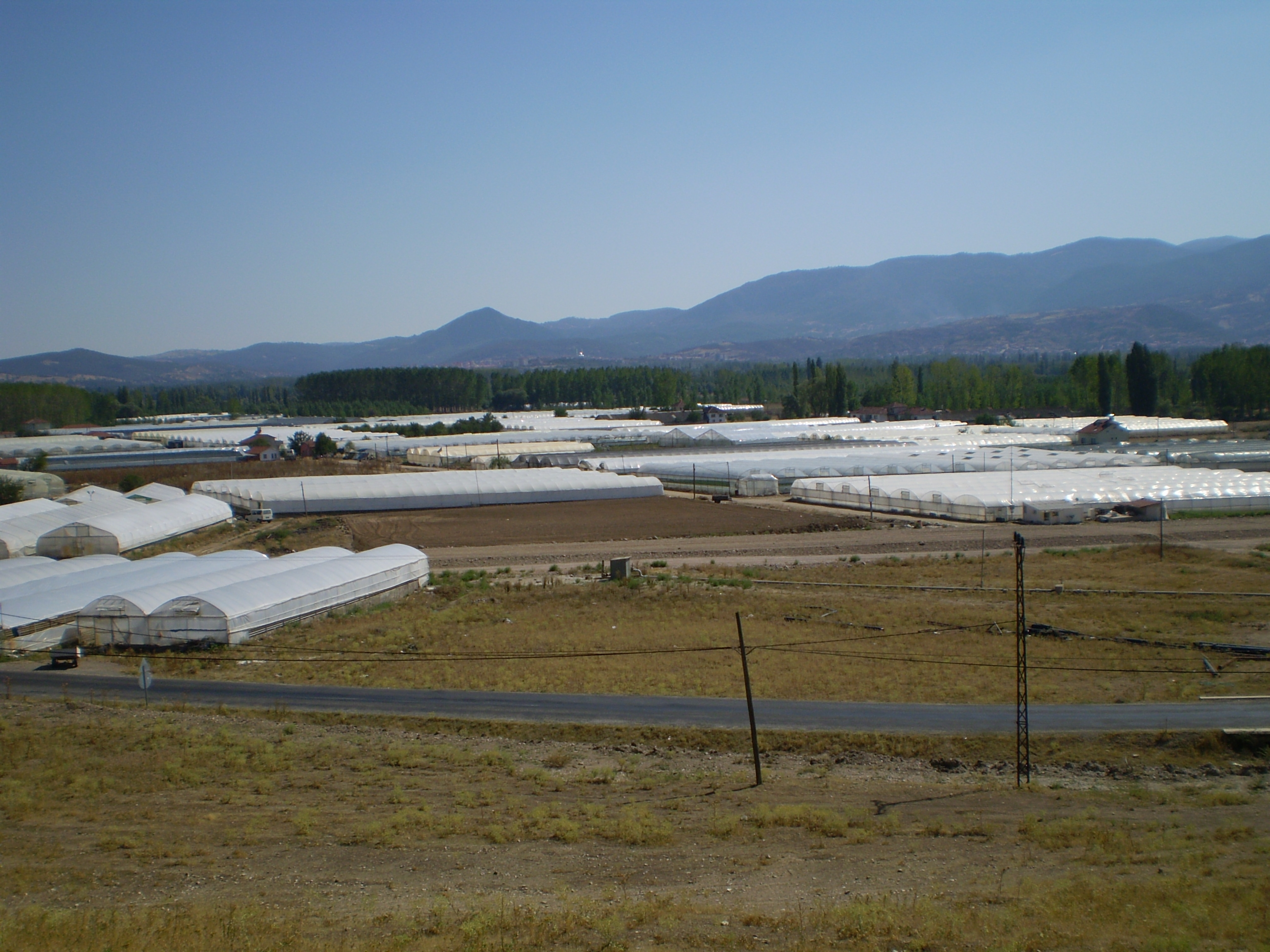
Greenhouse agriculture near the Eynal hot springs

Greenhouse-based agriculture takes place over about 510 decares in Simav district, of which about 360 are heated (using geothermal energy) and 150 are unheated. They produce annually 12,000 to 15,000 tons of tomatoes, 200 tons of cucumbers, 50 tons of strawberries and 30 tons of peppers. Tomatoes grown here are exported to places like Bursa, Eskişehir, and Istanbul.

Cherries and sour cherries are produced in some 15 villages in Simav District. The villages of Pulluca, Yağmurlar and Çakırtı are the biggest producers in the district. The district's average annual production is 10,000 tons of cherries and 5,000 tons of sour cherries.

The Simav chestnut is designated as a geographical indication within Turkey. Chestnut cultivation takes place over a large forested area on the northern foothills of Mt. Simav. This area (which is also south of the Simav-Balıkesir-İzmir highway) is about 25 to 30 km long, from east to west, and about 3 to 4 km deep. It extends from Nadarçam, in the district center, to the village of Yeniköy. Chestnut trees grow naturally in this area. A project of grafting the naturally growing chestnut trees began in the 1960s and, as of 2019, about 95% of the trees have been grafted. There are about 1,500 tons of chestnuts produced annually in the district, although the amount varies from year to year based on rainfall and climate conditions.

=== Animal husbandry ===
Animal husbandry is an important source of income for villagers in the district. As of 2019 there are about 38,000 cattle in the district, or about 20% of the province total; and about 80,000 small ruminants (55,000 sheep and 25,000 goats), or about 17% of the province total. Simav district also has one of the largest livestock markets in the region; it is held on Tuesdays and draws business from various provinces such as Bursa, Istanbul, Balıkesir, Afyon, Uşak, and Manisa.

=== Timber and mining ===
There are 20 sawmills in the district as of 2019. There are also 38 mines in the district, which include clay, sand, and gravel extractions.

=== Manufacturing ===
Although the manufacturing sector is not as prominent in Simav district, there are several large factories in the district. One of the largest is Kazcıoğlu Otomotiv, which employs 208 people as of 2019 and produces 100,000 kg of pressure-resistant pipes of various sizes, 30,000 kg of pressure-resistant hose, and 615 kg of zinc electroplating annually for use in the automotive sector. Another important factory is Küpeliler Endustri's oriented strand board factory in Simav town, which employs 95 people as of 2019. This is sold under the brand Westboard OSB and is mainly used to supply the construction and packaging sectors. As of 2022, there were plans to expand the plant with a new press, making it the first of its kind in Turkey to use continuous pressing.

Many textile factories were also established in the district in the 1980s.

=== Food processing ===
Food processing in Simav district includes production of halva and herbal tea.

=== Carpet manufacturing, mat weaving, and village handicrafts ===
Carpet manufacturing was also historically important in Simav district. It is traced back to the 1850s, when one Kozanoğlu Abdurrahman Hoca brought instructors to Simav from Gördes; as a result, the carpets made at Simav were made in the Gördes style. As of 1913, some 1,120 people were employed in carpet manufacturing in Simav. By the 1920s, carpet weaving had begun to spread from Simav town into the surrounding villages, and in the 1930s Persian-style carpets began to be manufactured in Simav as well. Around the 1950s, there were about 900 plain looms and 100 Persian looms in the district, both in Simav town and in villages like Çavdır, Değirmenciler, Hüsüm, and Yeşilova (Semerköy).

Mat weaving, made from reeds harvested on the shores of Lake Simav, was also historically an important source of income for some of the villages around the lake. Çitgöl was the center of this activity. Historically, the mats were exported to places like Aydın, Denizli, Manisa, İzmir, and Balıkesir. However, mat weaving went into a serious decline after Lake Simav was dried up in the 1960s, and the craft is almost extinct locally as of 2019. It is primarily done by women.

In the village of Bahtıllı, some 20 km from Simav town, women also contribute to the family economy by hand-weaving and embroidering things like aprons, when not involved in agriculture or animal husbandry. The aprons are decorated with various floral or geometric designs, with common motifs including carnations and the tree of life. Historically, local women spun the thread themselves from raw wool fibers, but today they buy factory-spun thread instead. Local women also make fabric waist ties for commercial purposes.
