= Gümüşsu, Simav =

Gümüşsu
- Village
- Location within Turkey Location within Turkey Aegean
- Coordinates: 39°8′25″N 28°53′6″E
- Country: Turkey
- Province: Kütahya
- District: Simav
- Elevation: 790 m (2,590 ft)
- Population (2022): 560
- Time zone: UTC+3 (TRT)
- Postal code: 43500
- Area code: 0274

Gümüşsu (formerly: Kelem Yenice) is a village in the Simav District of Kütahya Province, Turkey. Its population is 560 (2022). Before the 2013 reorganisation, it was a town (belde). Gümüşsu is located 12 kilometres away from Simav.
