= Bahtıllı =

Village in Simav district, Kütahya province, Turkey

- Village
- Location within Turkey Location within Turkey Aegean
- Coordinates: 39°9′20″N 28°48′1″E
- Country: Turkey
- Province: Kütahya
- District: Simav
- Population (2022): 383
- Time zone: UTC+3 (TRT)

Bahtıllı is a village in the Simav District of Kütahya Province, Turkey. As of 2022, its population is 383. Before the 2013 reorganisation, it was a town (belde).

Bahtıllı is located on the upper edge of the Simav Çayı's plain, and is separated by a low range of hills from the Simav Gölü. It is 20 km from the town of Simav, 106 km west-southwest of the city of Kütahya, and 118 km south of Bursa.

About 1 km west of the village are the ruins of a square fortress, with walls about 70 m long on each side. The walls are partly overgrown with brush, but they are easily visible on all sides. The north wall is the best preserved, and at the northeast corner a 7 m-tall section is still standing. The walls are made of broken rubbly stone ("bruchstein") embedded in a white mortar matrix; in the past, they would have been clad with large stone blocks. Some of these larger blocks are still visible, embedded in the mortar. The whole complex dates from sometime between the 600s and the 1200s and probably follows an earlier Roman fortress. Numerous spolia present in the modern village of Bahtıllı likely came from an earlier settlement near the fortress. The spolia mainly consists of Roman-era fragments, but some early Byzantine column capitals are also present.

An ancient Greek inscription found at Bahtıllı refers to it as "Goloinon gerousia" (Γολοινῶν γερουσία), indicating that the place's ancient name may have been Goloē or Goloia. A couple of other inscriptions, dating from the early 4th century, appear to have originally come from the nearby ancient city of Ankyra.

Women in Bahtıllı, in addition to working in agriculture or animal husbandry, also contribute to the family economy by hand-weaving and embroidering things like aprons. The aprons are decorated with various floral or geometric designs, with common motifs including carnations and the tree of life. Historically, local women spun the thread themselves from raw wool fibers, but today they buy factory-spun thread instead. Local women also make fabric waist ties for commercial purposes.
