= Gördesli Makbule =

Turkish woman guerrilla, hero of the National Liberation War

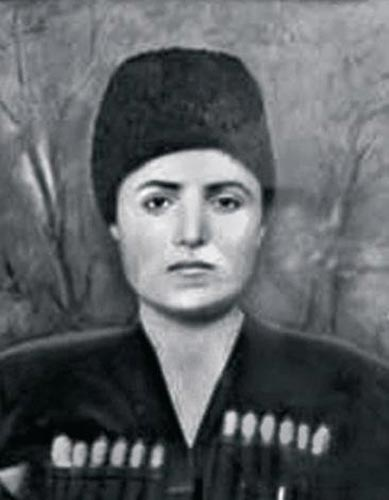
- Born: 1902; Gördes
- Died: March 17, 1922 (aged 19–20); Akkocalı

Gördesli Makbule (1902–1922), also known as Makbule Efe, was a woman guerrilla from Turkey, one of the heroes of the National Liberation War. She fought as a member of Kuva-yı Milliye against the Greek invasion.

== Early life ==
Makbule was born in Gördes, Manisa. She had a large family who owned a farm and some land. She learned horse-riding and shooting at an early age like many other women in her town.

== Military experience ==
She participated in military resistance in 1922, and fought in and around Demirci, Gördes, Simav, Bigadiç ve Sındırgı.

She was shot aged 20.

== Commemoration ==
Her grave was discovered by Zekeriya Özdemir in Gördes in 2000. Commemoration events were organised in Gördes to mark the 100th year of her death.
