= Simav Graben =

The Simav Graben is a graben around the town of Simav, in Kütahya Province of Turkey. It is a roughly east–west structure between two mountain ranges on the north and south. The graben formed sometime after the Miocene period, possibly during the Pliocene or Quaternary periods, and has since been filled in with a thick layer of sediment during the Quaternary period.

== Description ==
The Simav Graben is about 50 km long, from east to west, and about 10 km wide. It is bordered by normal faults on both the north and south. The southern boundary is the Simav Fault, while the northern boundary is, according to Karasözen et al., either "several discontinuous fault segments" or a single fault in the Akdağ region. (Palabiyik and Serpen characterize the northern boundary as "a few extensional faults".) The Simav Fault is the more pronounced of the two. It runs east–west for about 80 km, with one end near Düvertepe and the other near Şaphane. Its footwall is the Demircidağ mountain range, also called Simav Mountain, and the north face of the mountains has a steep escarpment separating it from the plains below. These mountains form a horst relative to the Simav graben. The Akdağ mountains to the north are another horst structure, which is lower in elevation.

The graben itself "tilts northward", and the Simav River runs along its north side. The former Lake Simav used to be in the graben, but it was drained in 1959. There is also a significant geothermal field, caused by activity of the Simav Fault, located in the northeastern part of the graben.

== Stratigraphy ==
The lowest rock strata in the area consist of Paleozoic metamorphic rocks, which are exposed in many outcrops in the surrounding mountains. In the graben, these metamorphic rocks are overlain by younger sedimentary rocks. Above this is a layer of "volcanic rocks and lake sediments" from the Miocene era. Above this are several younger formations, and at the very top is a thick layer of alluvium, several hundred meters deep, dating to the Quaternary period.

== Formation ==
The Simav Graben was formed as a pull-apart basin caused by extensional tectonics sometime after the Miocene period. According to Gürol Seyitoğlu, the graben is a recent formation, dating to the Quaternary and possibly as early as the Pliocene.

== Holocene palaeoclimatology ==
Based on a drill core sample taken from the middle of what used to be the lake, it seems that the there was an "arid phase" around 14,000 years ago, which was before the Late Glacial Warming. After this, there seems to have been a steady "wet phase", with the lake and marsh existing throughout the Holocene.

Based on radiocarbon dating of sediment samples, there seem to have been significant and rapid lake level falls, indicating likely dry periods and drought, at 8,000 years ago (during the 8.2-kiloyear event), 3,900 years ago, 2,900 years ago, and 2,000 years ago. A couple of these correlate fairly well to what archaeologists have identified as likely times of upheaval at the end of the Early Bronze Age III, around 4,200 years ago, and during the Early Iron Age, around 3,200 years ago (the Bronze Age Collapse). At the same time, the lake's high points, indicating ample rainfall, include the Late Chalcolithic-Early Bronze Age I transition as well as the Hellenistic and Roman periods, which are both considered "times of economic stability and growth in the region".
