= Isparta Museum =

Archaeological museum in Turkey

- Isparta Müzesi
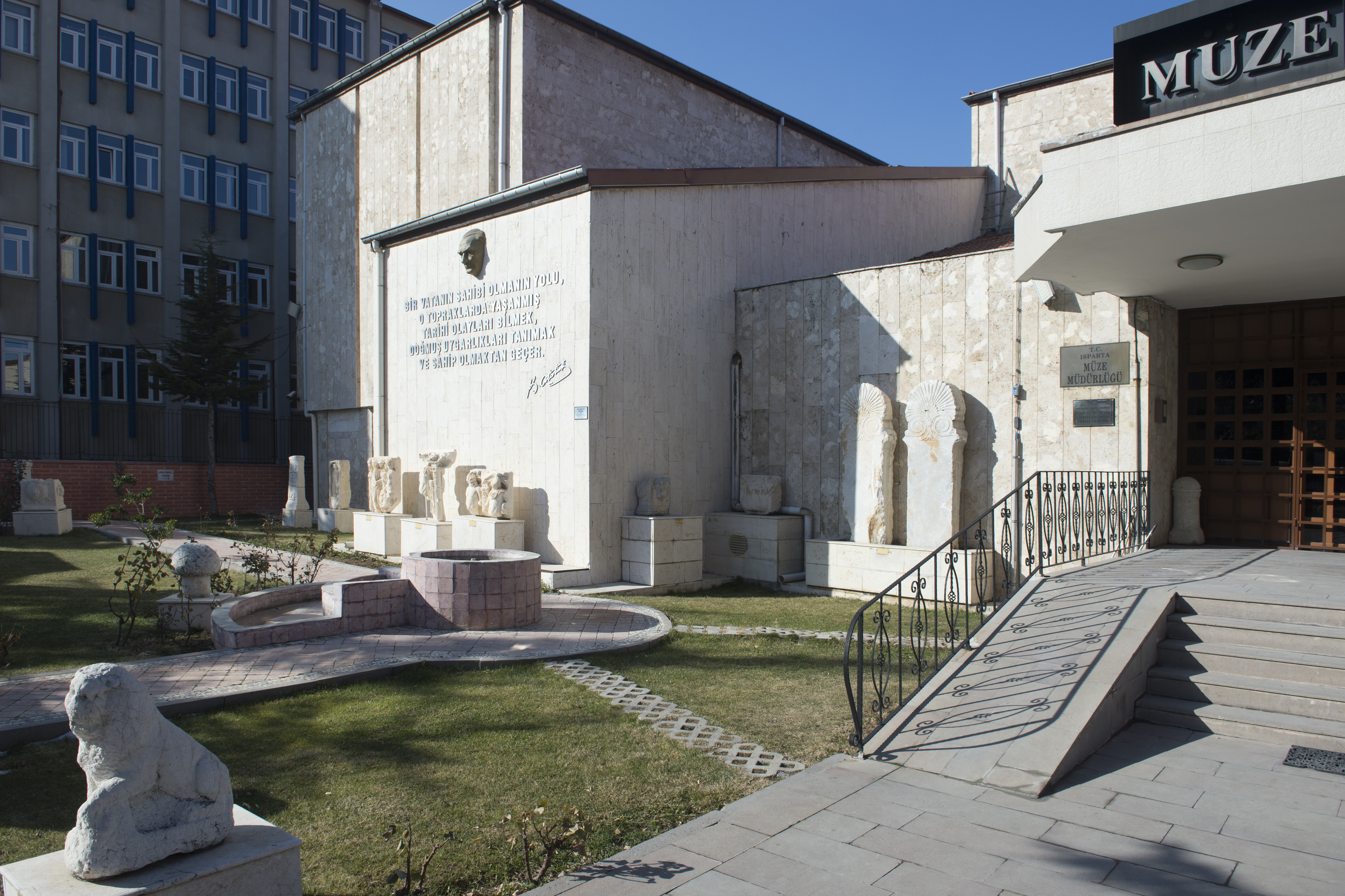
- Isparta Museum front view

- Isparta Museum
- Established: 1985; 41 years ago
- Location: Millet street Isparta, Turkey
- Coordinates: 37°46′15″N 30°33′30″E
- Type: Archaeology, Ethnography
- Collections: Hellenistic Pisidia, Roman Empire, Byzantine Empire, Seljuk Empire, Ottoman Empire
- Collection size: 16911
- Owner: Ministry of Culture and Tourism

Isparta Museum is a museum in Isparta, Turkey. It is on Millet street in Isparta at 37°46′15″N 30°33′30″E.

The museum was opened on 6 March 1985. Following a restoration it was reopened in 2003.

The Isparta Museum was closed to visitors in 2014 for renovation and strengthening works; although a decision was later made to demolish and rebuild the building, no construction has been initiated for years.

== Items ==
There are four main halls; archaeology, ethnography, treasure and carpet. Also in the passage to archaeology hall a typical Isparta house is displayed.

In the archaeology hall, sculptures, iconas and steles are displayed. Most important item is a Eurymedon sculpture from Aksu Zindan cave. In treasury hall, coins of Hellenistic Pisidia, Roman Empire, Byzantine Empire, Seljukid, Ottoman Empire and other Islamic age coins are exhibited. Ottoman medals are also exhibited in this section. There are illumination gadgets, clothes, accessories, weapons, firmans (decrees), weighting instruments, coffee accessories are in the ethnographic hall. Carpet hall especially notable for Isparta is known as one of the carpet and rose producing cities of Turkey. In this hall in addition to Isparta carpets, carpets from Uşak, Gördes, Çanakkale, Bergama, Antalya, Nevşehir, Kırşehir, Kayseri, East Anatolia and Konya are exhibited. Instruments for distillation of attar of roses are also displayed in the carpet hall. Finally in the yard of the museum, rock carved items such as tombstones are displayed. There are 16911 items (including coins) in the museum.

== Gallery ==
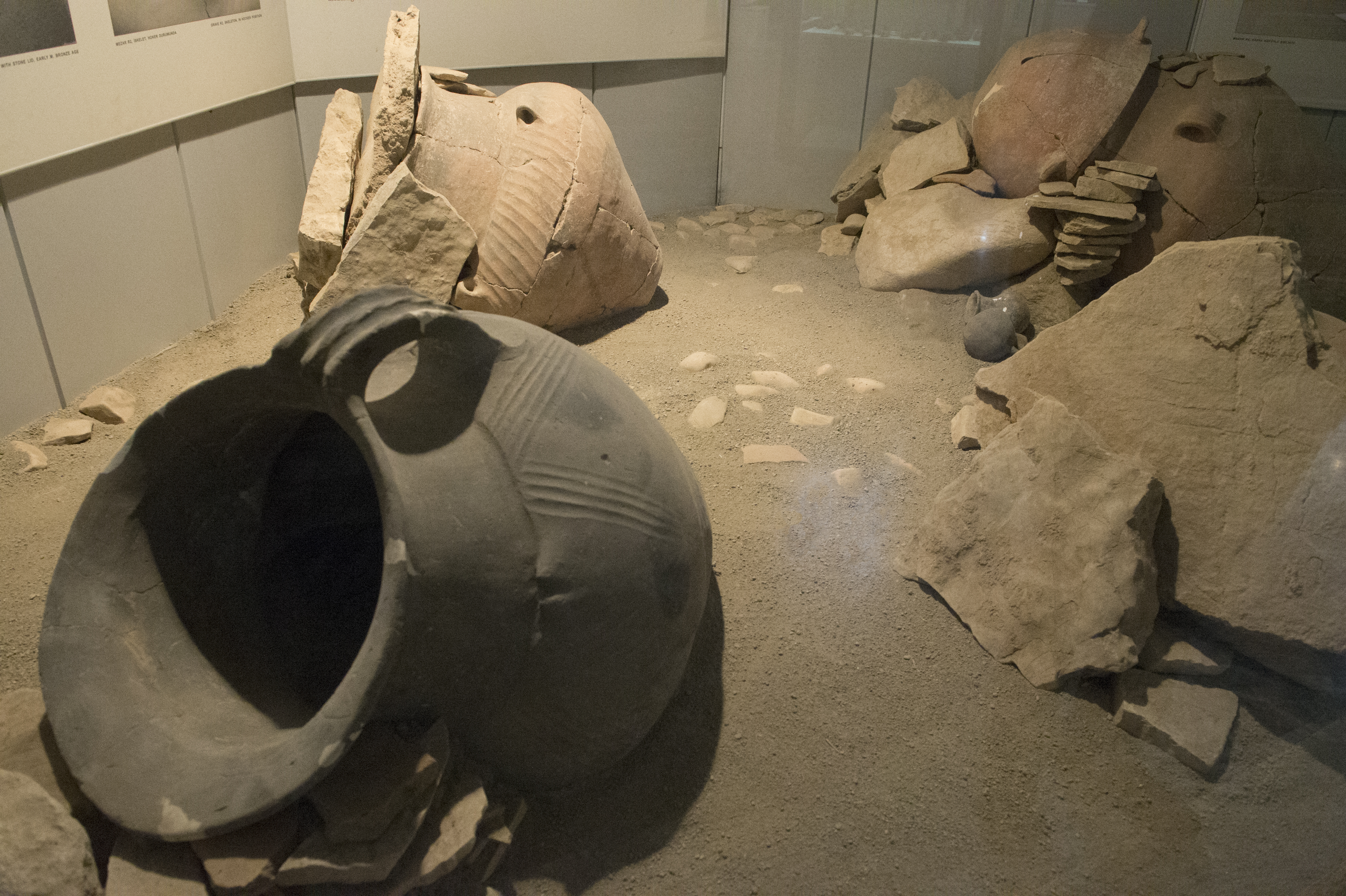
Isparta museum Göndürle Höyük burial vessels 4942

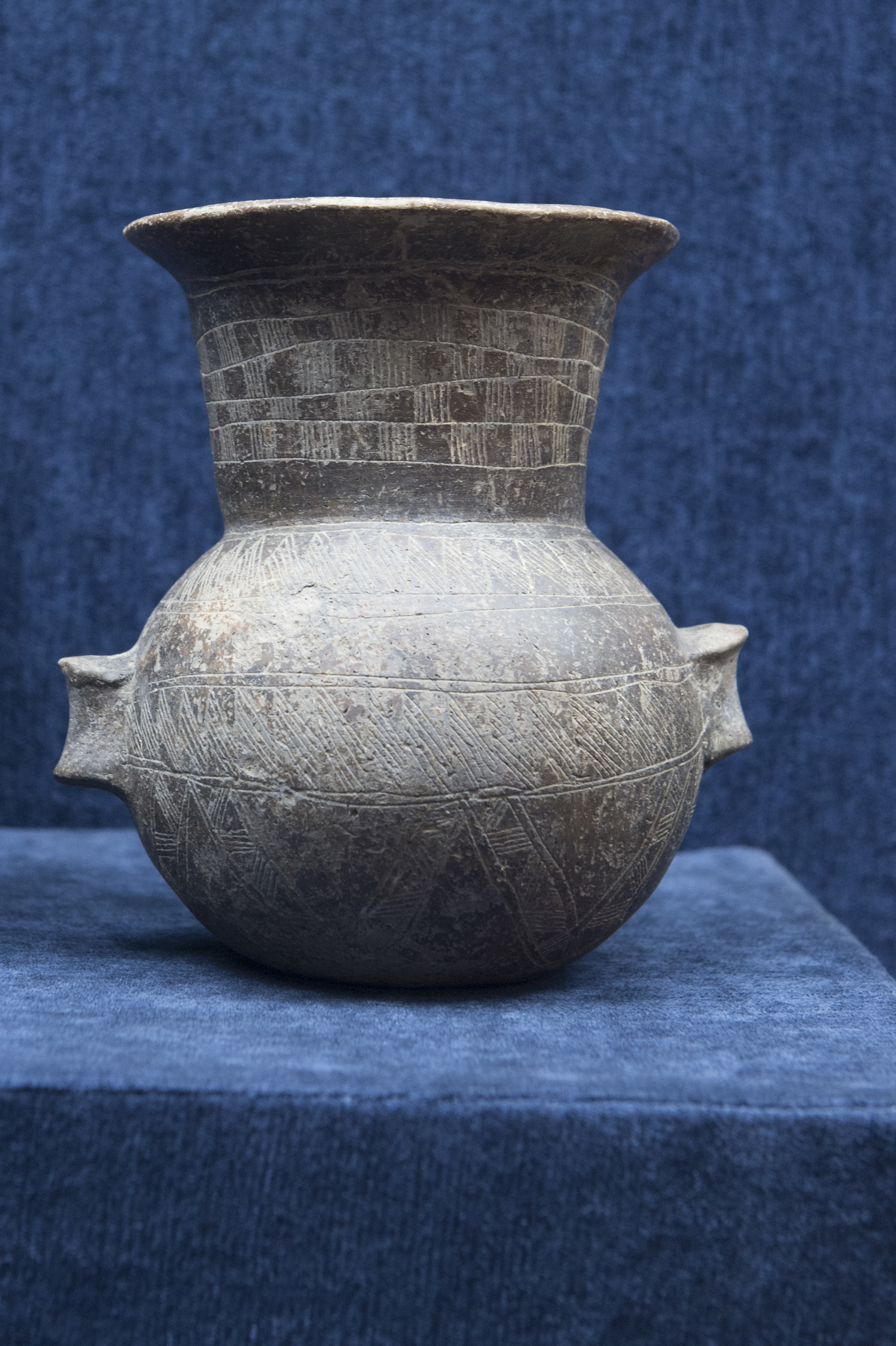
Isparta museum Early Bronze Age vessel 2791

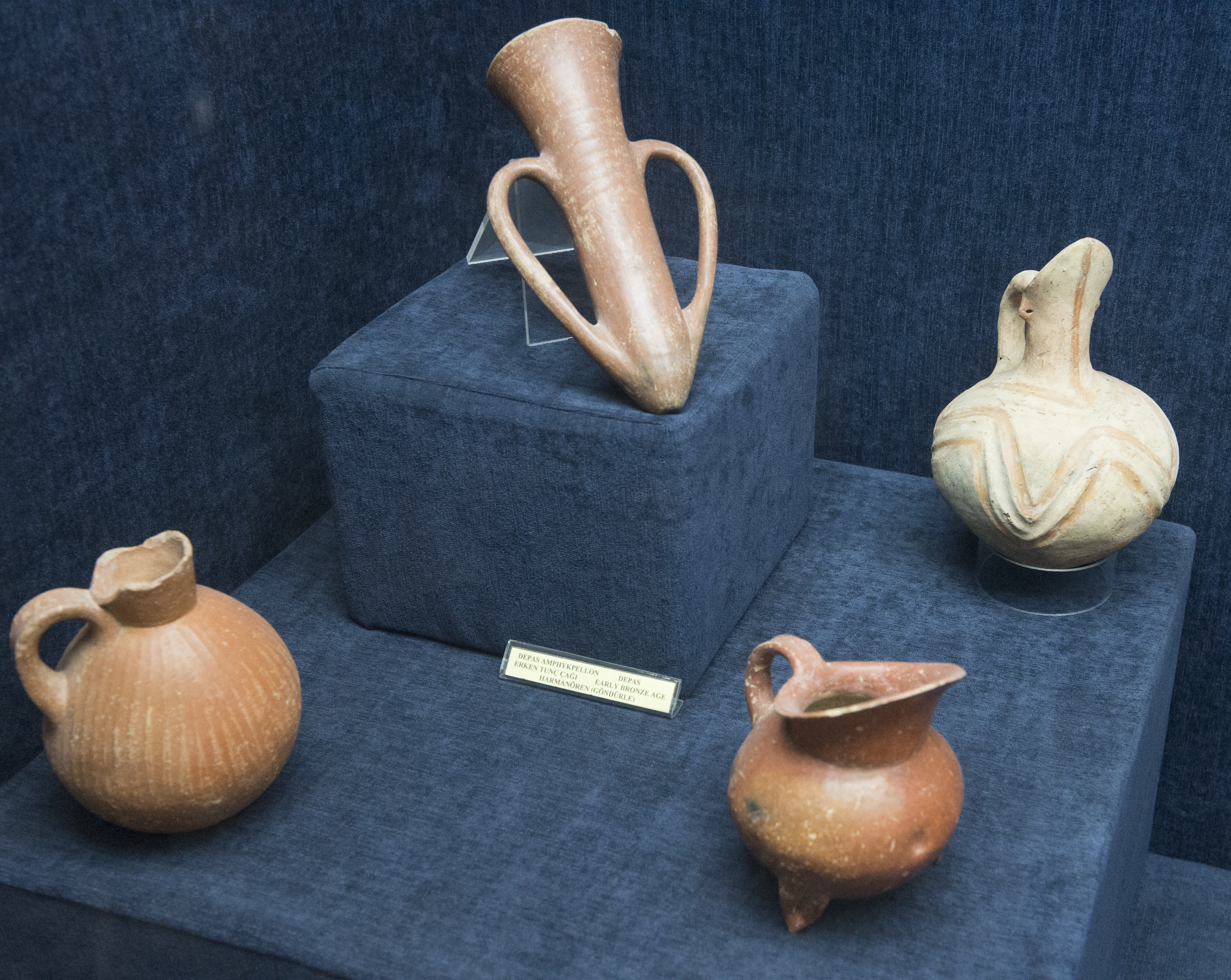
Isparta museum Early Bronze Age vessels 4945

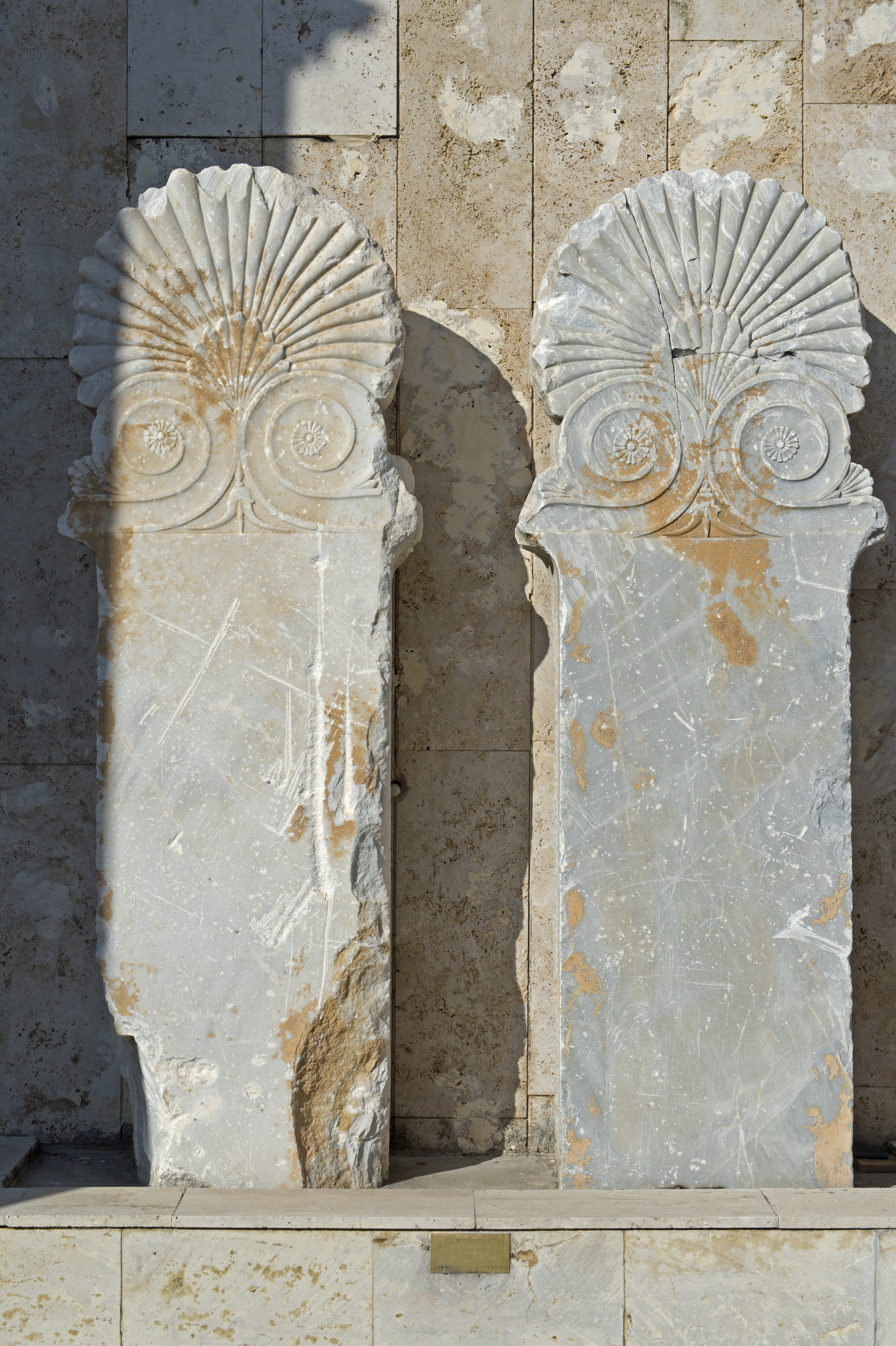
Isparta museum Late Archaic steles 4990

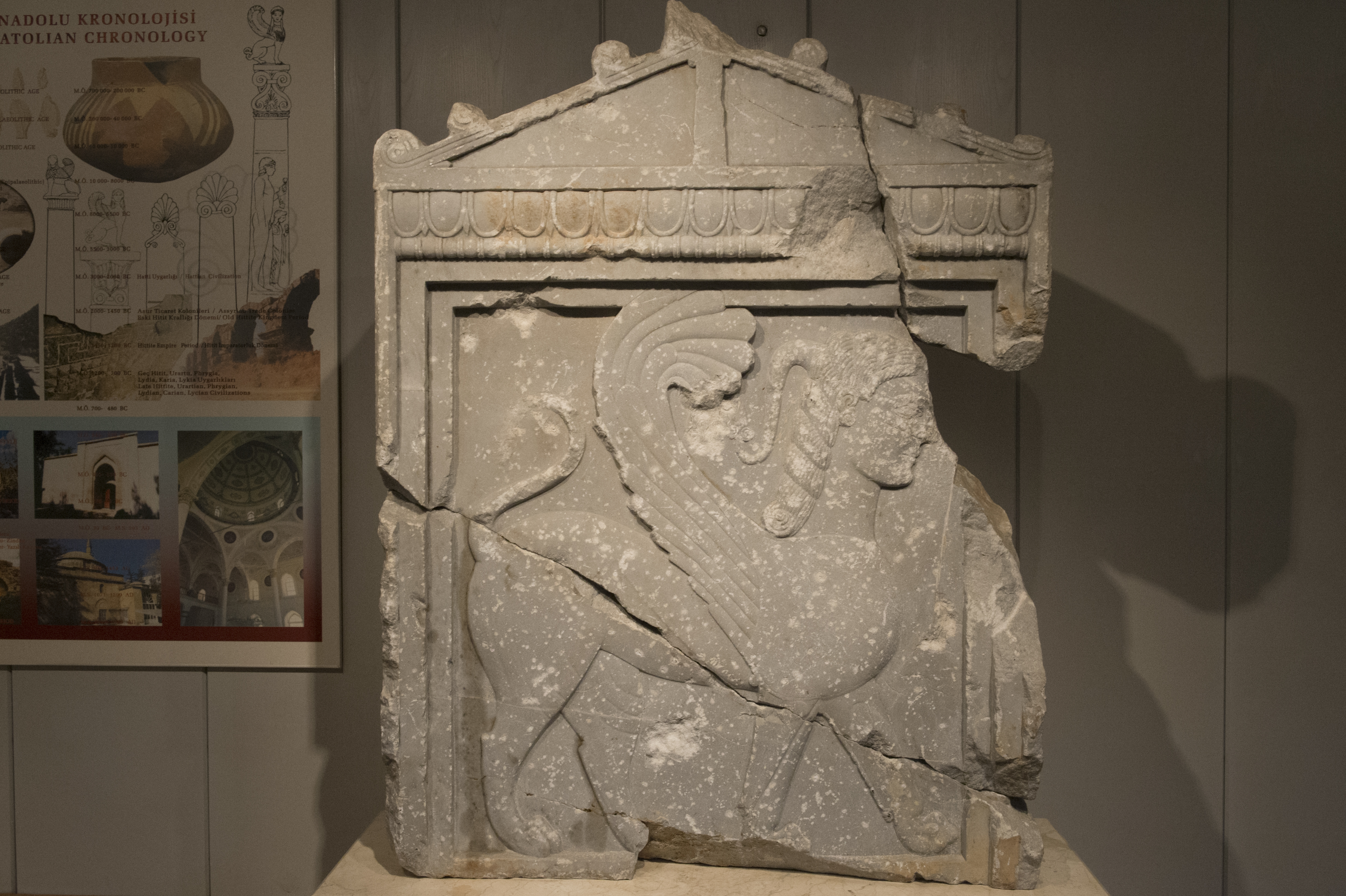
Isparta museum Late Archaic stele 2796

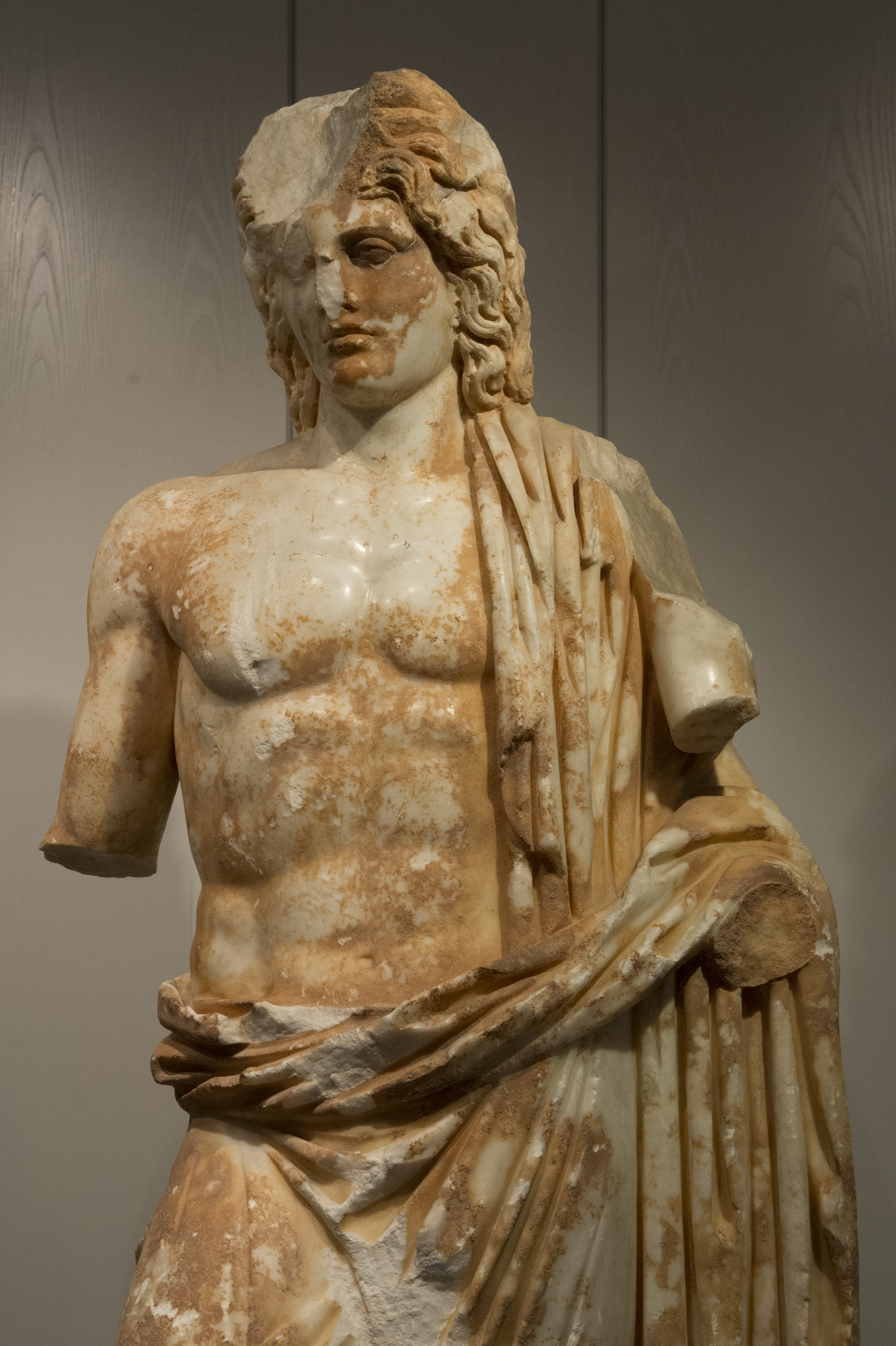
Isparta museum Men a local god 2810

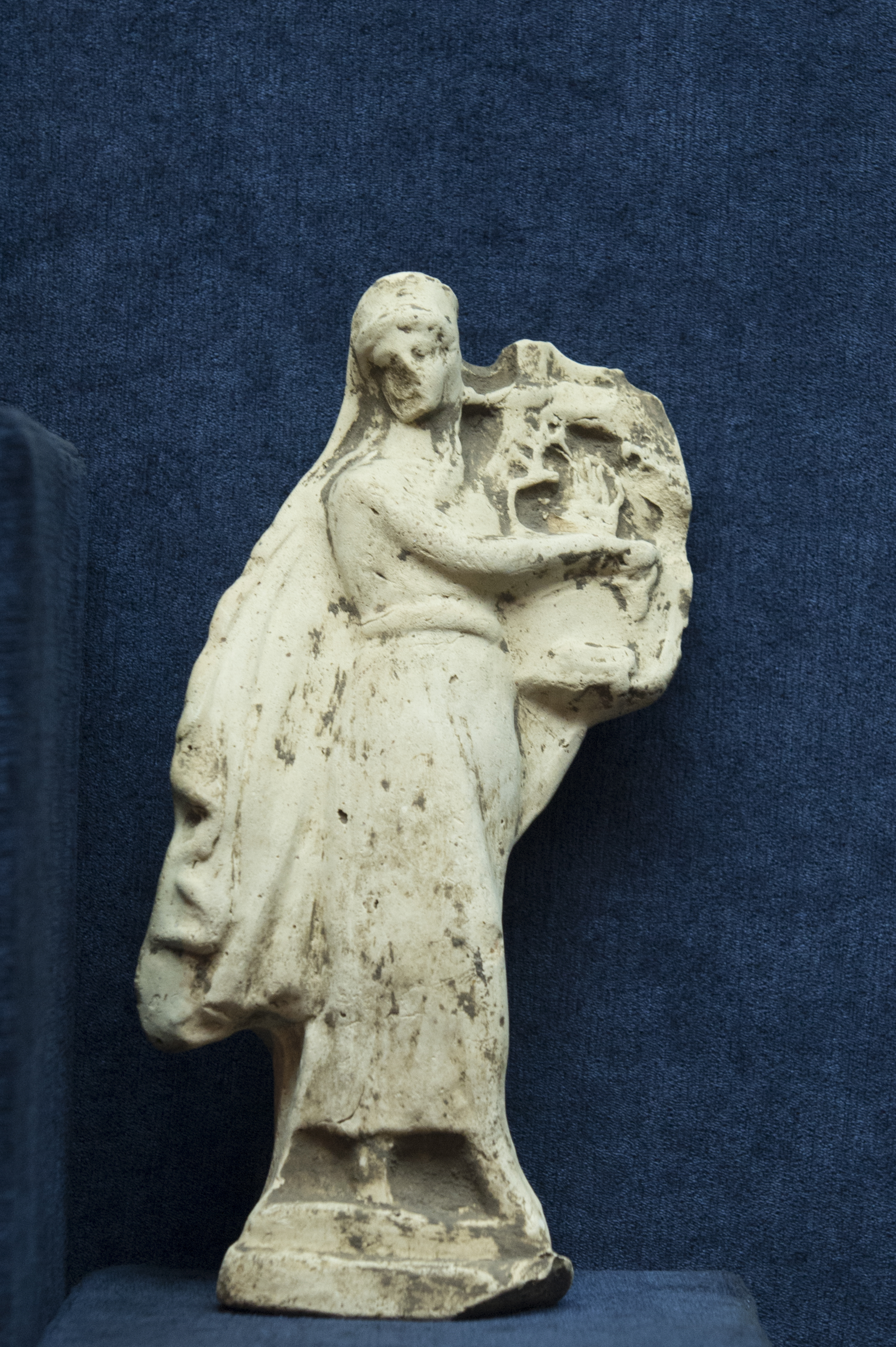
Isparta museum Roman figurine 2802

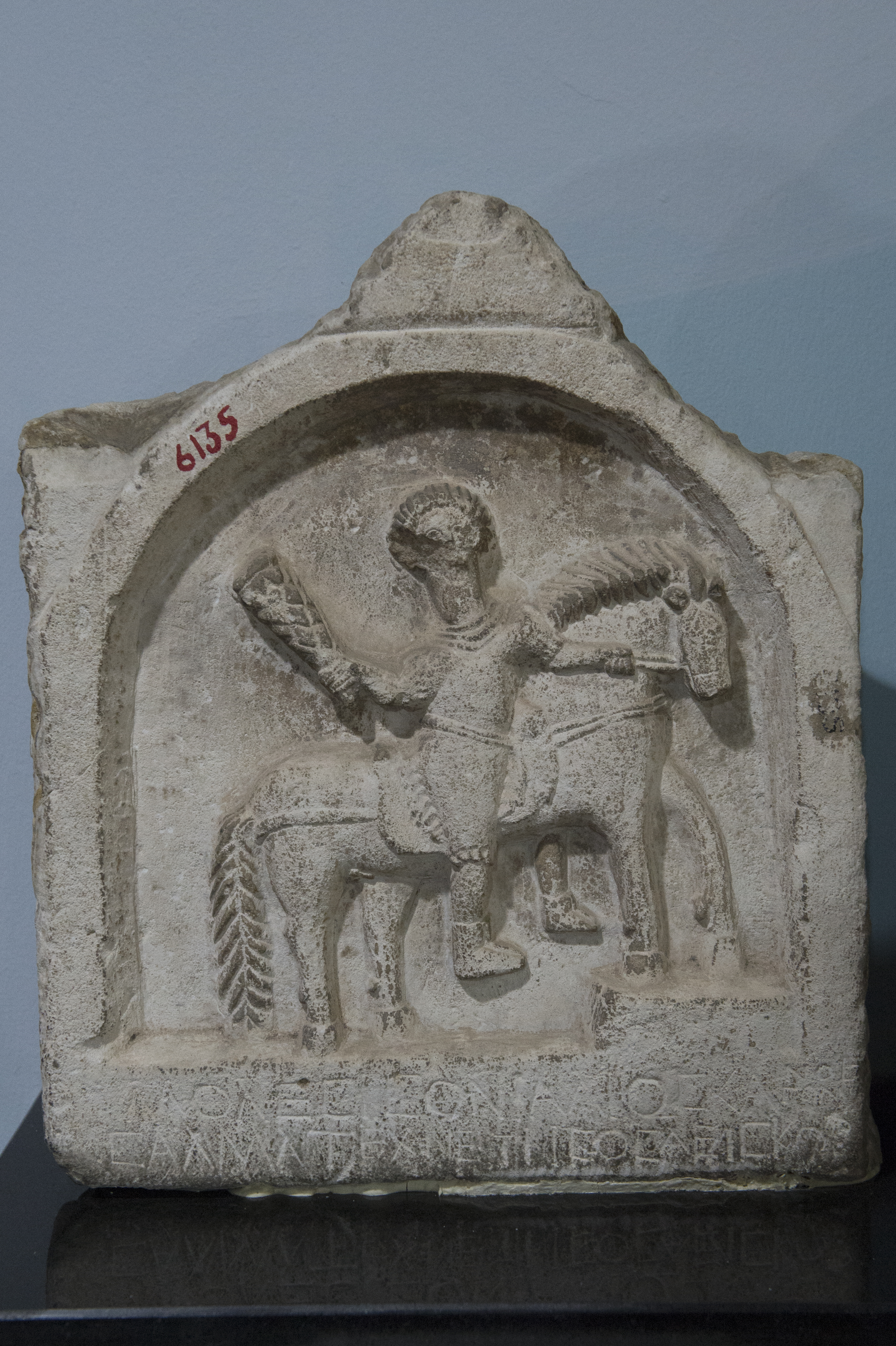
Isparta museum rider god 2778

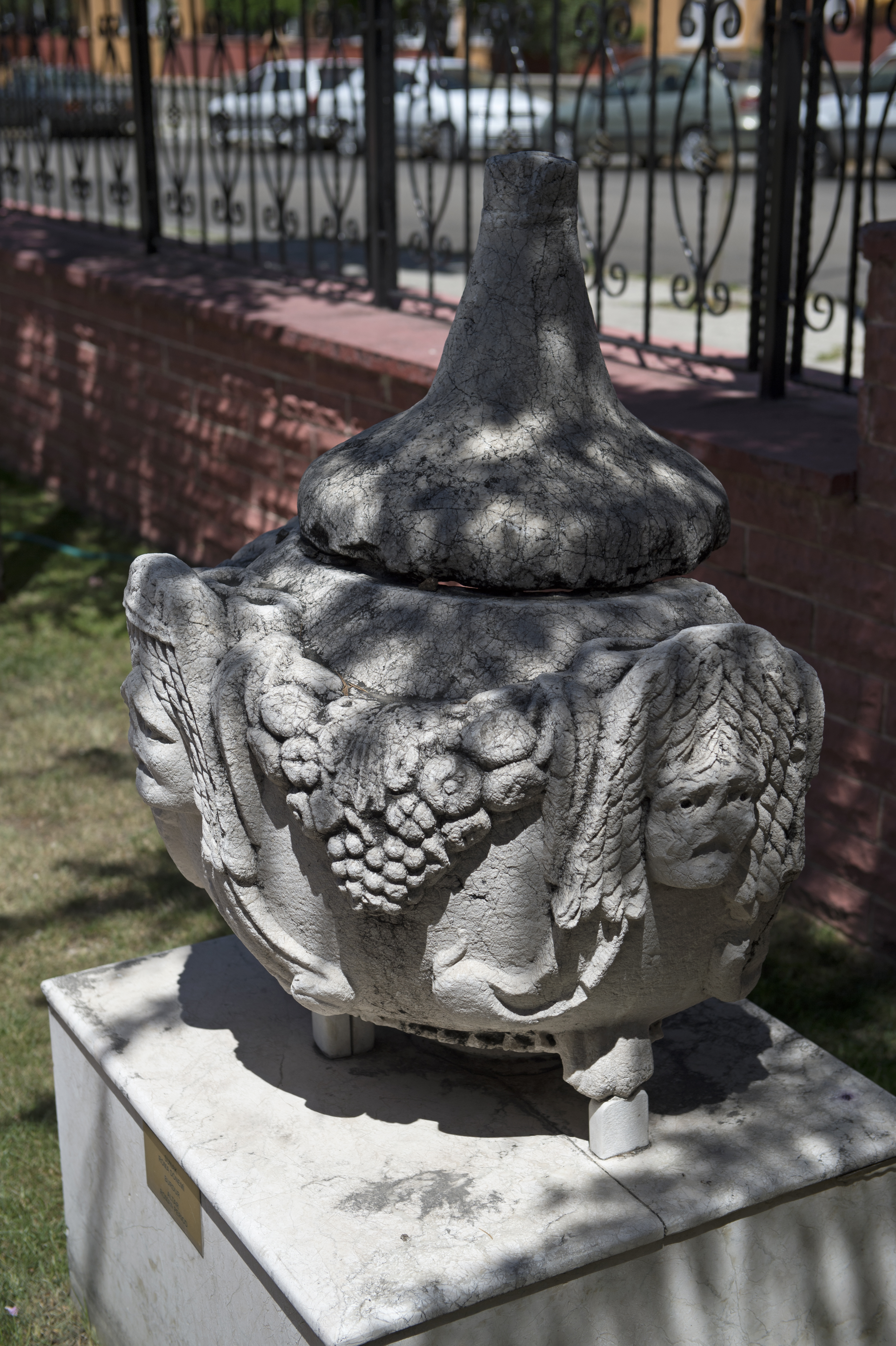
Isparta museum Roman altar 2815

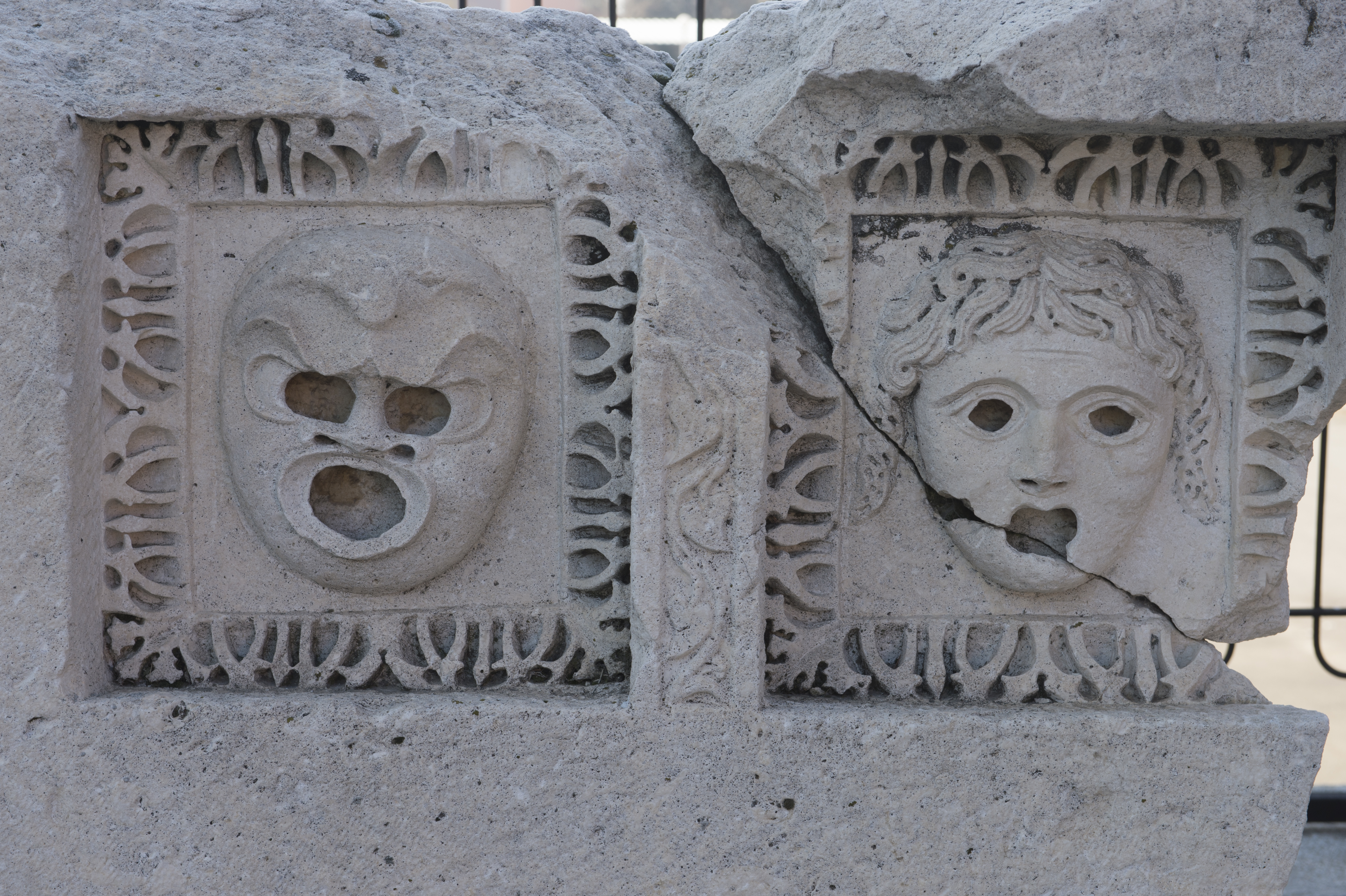
Isparta museum theater mask in garden 4991

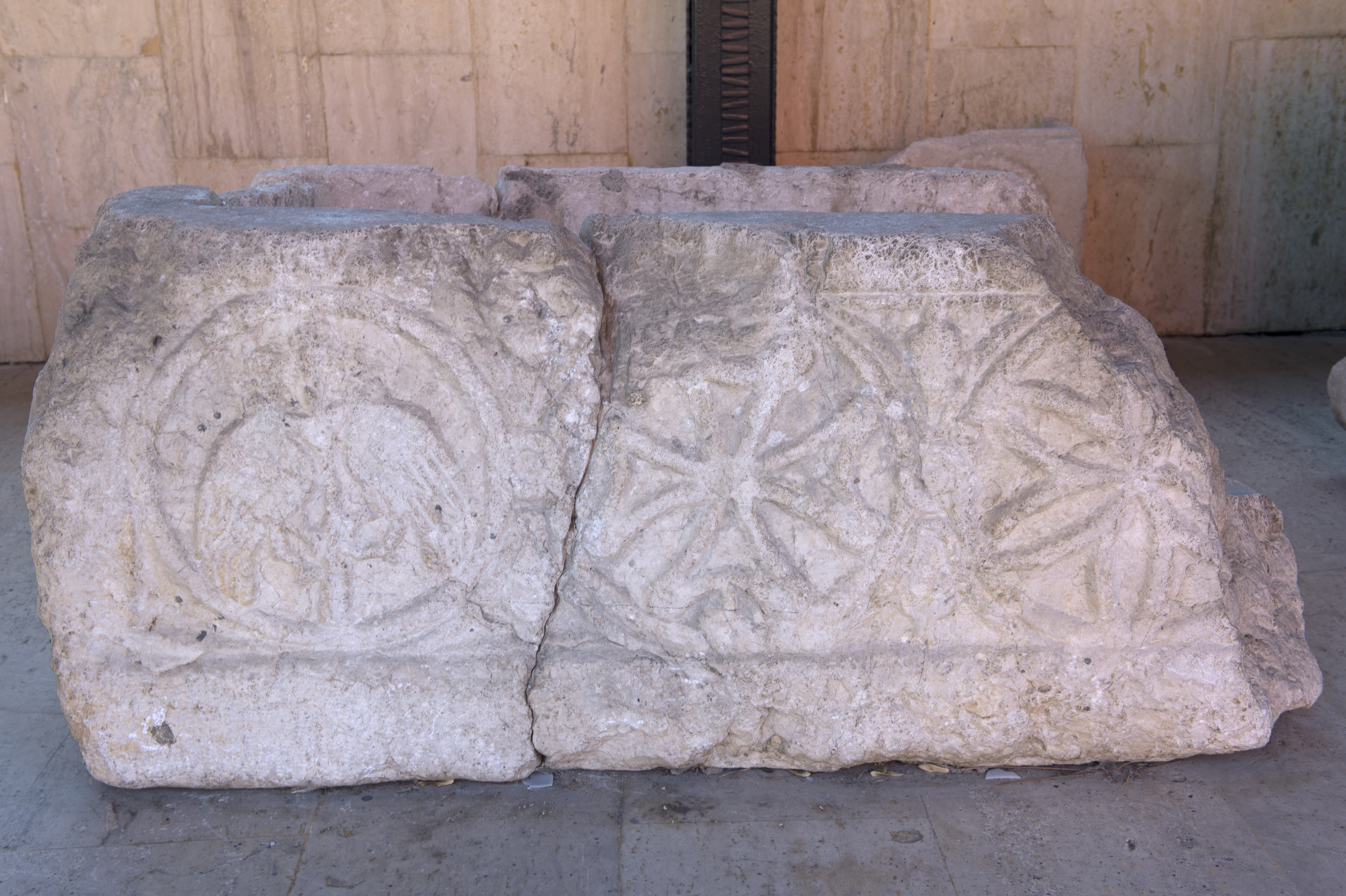
Isparta church fragement

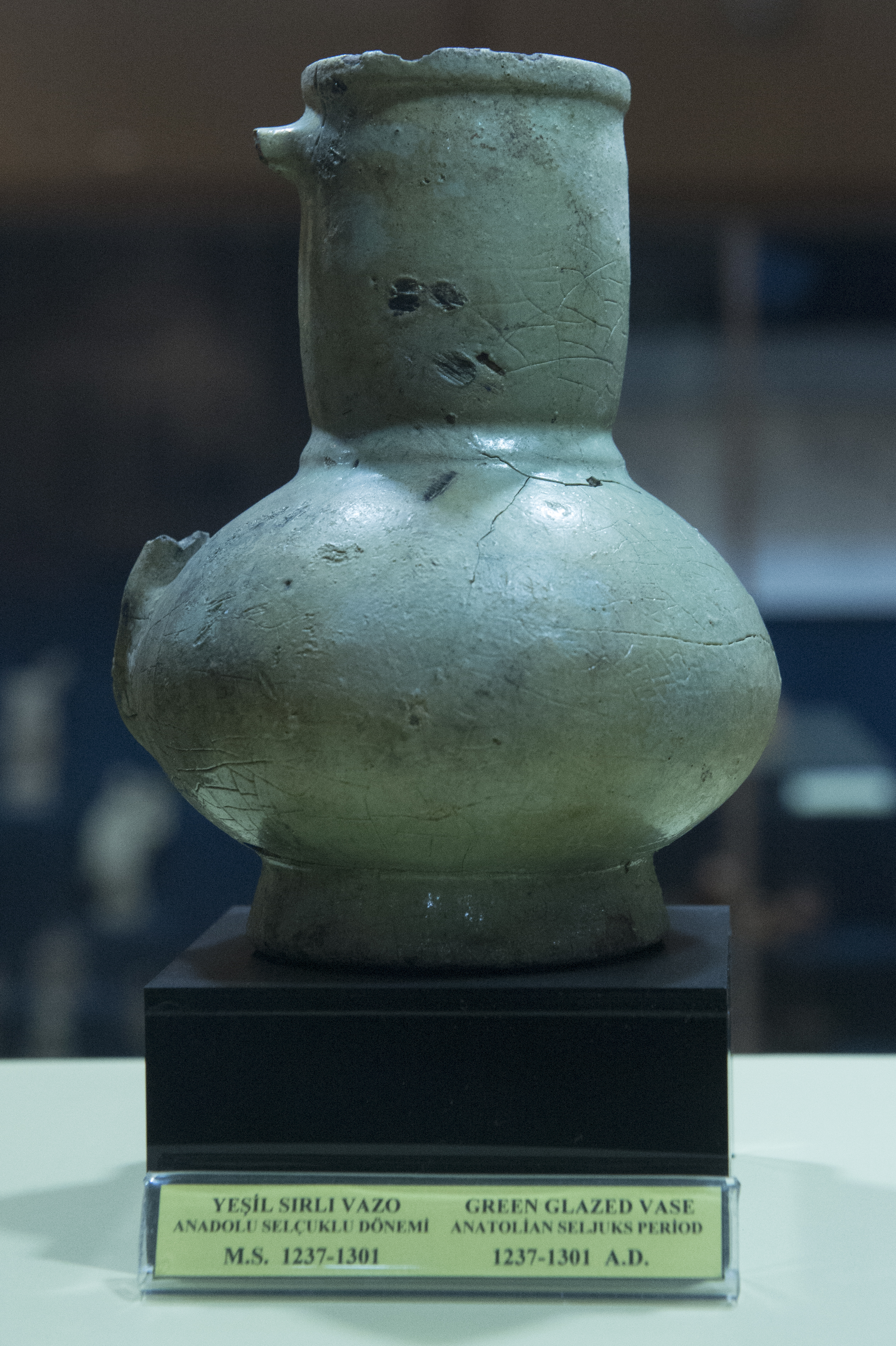
Isparta museum green glazed Seljuk ceramic 4955

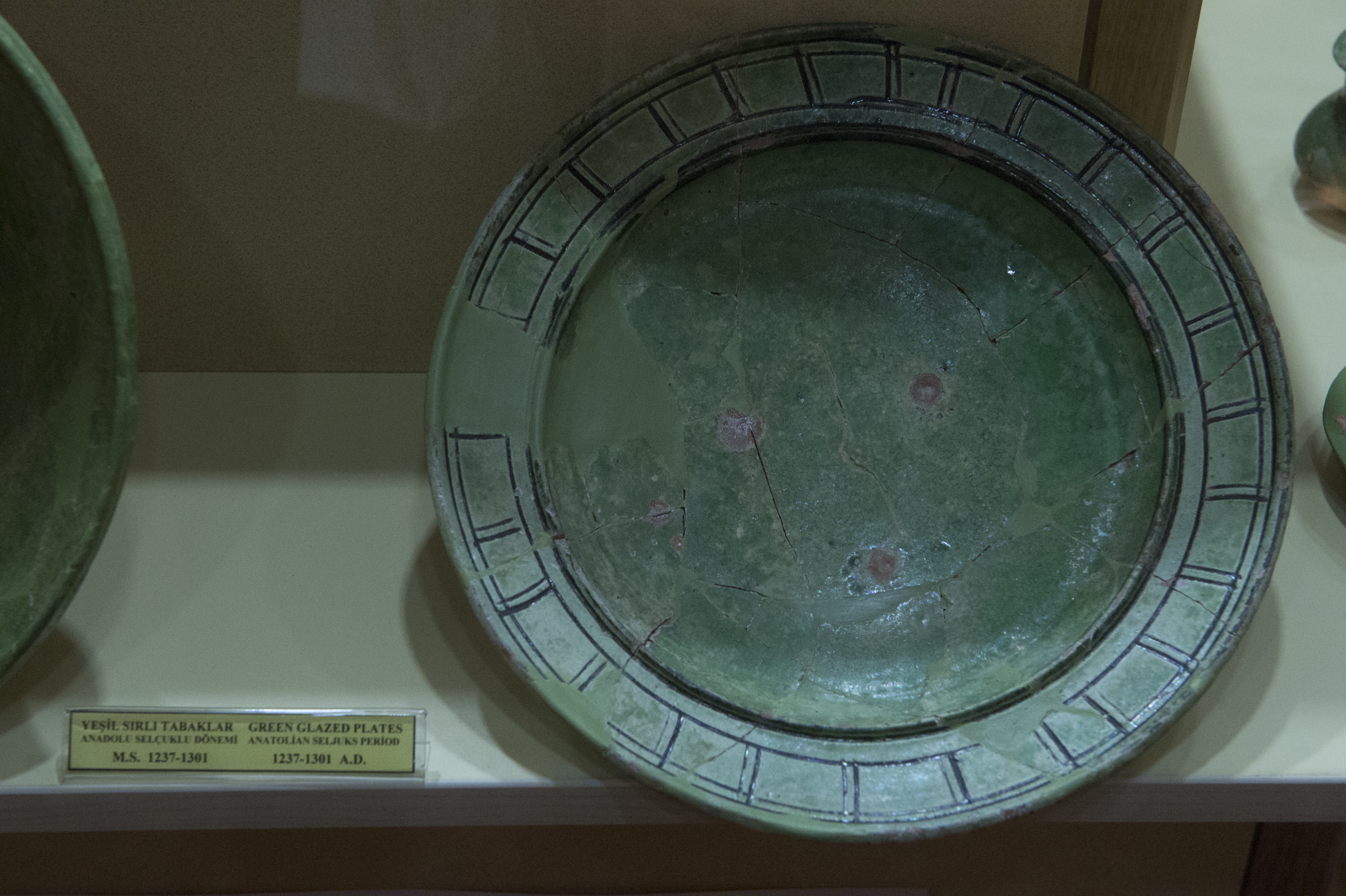
Isparta museum green glazed Seljuk ceramic 4956

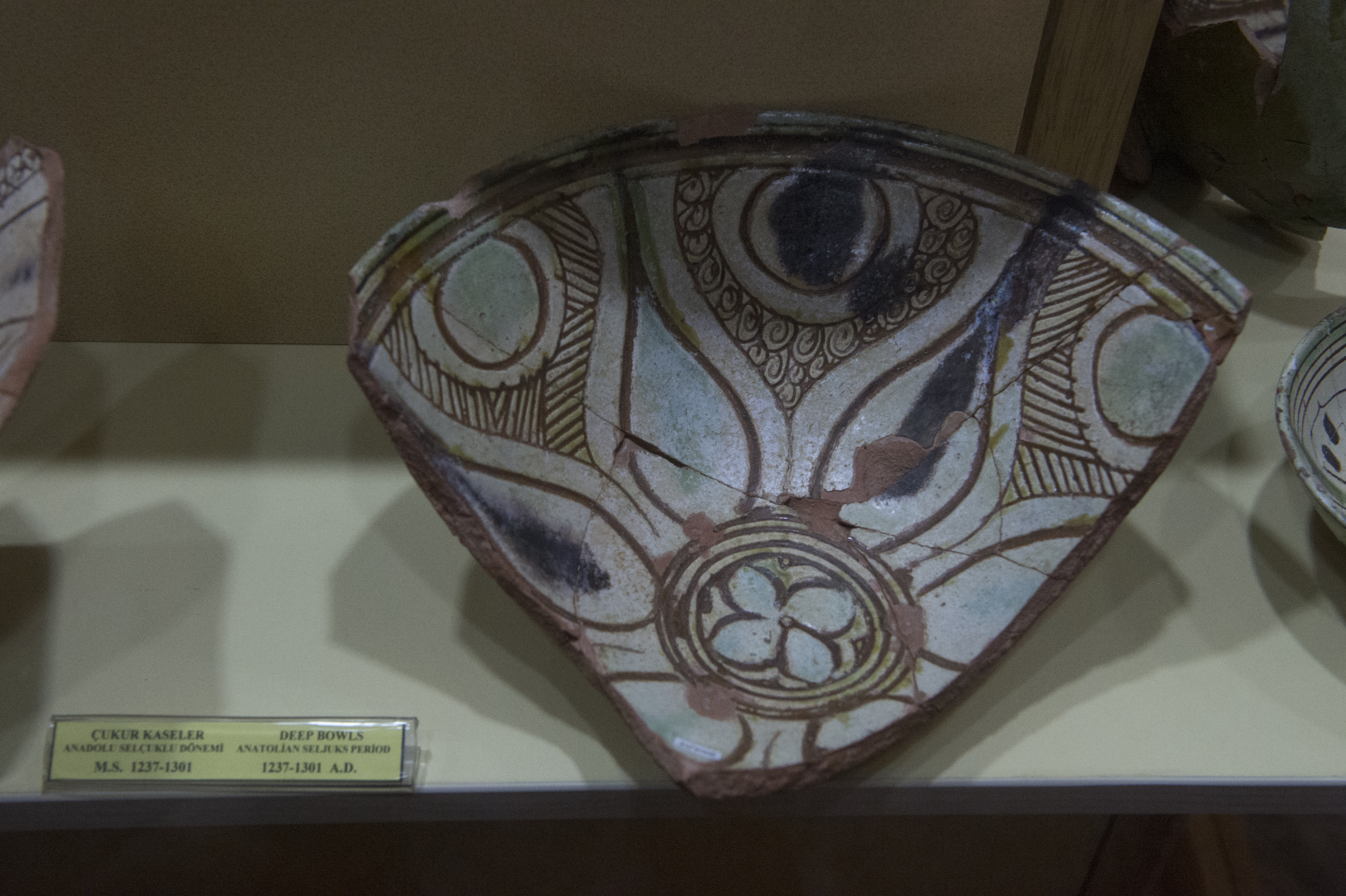
Isparta museum Anatolian Seljuk ceramic 4961

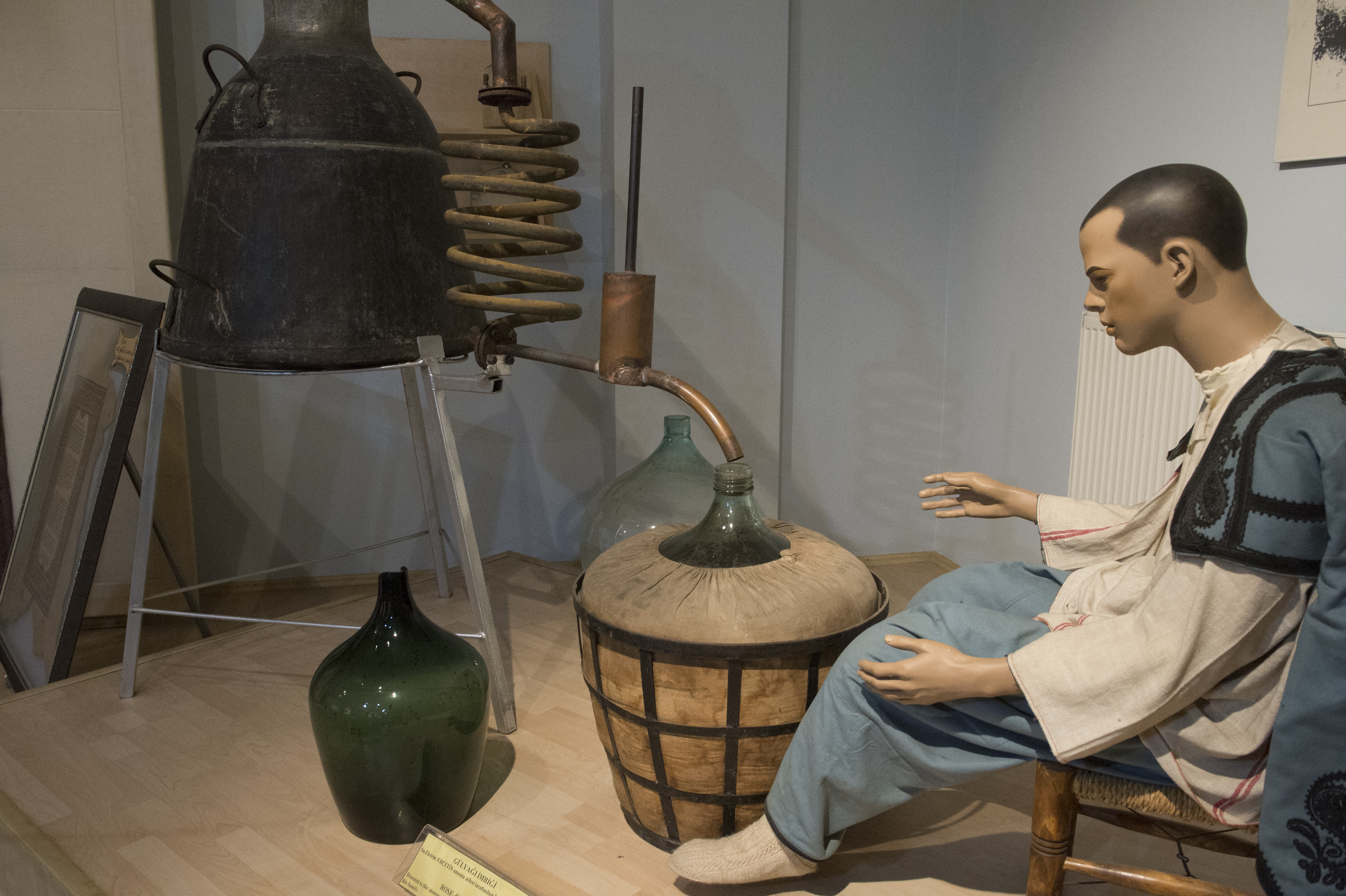
Isparta museum rose oil production 4987

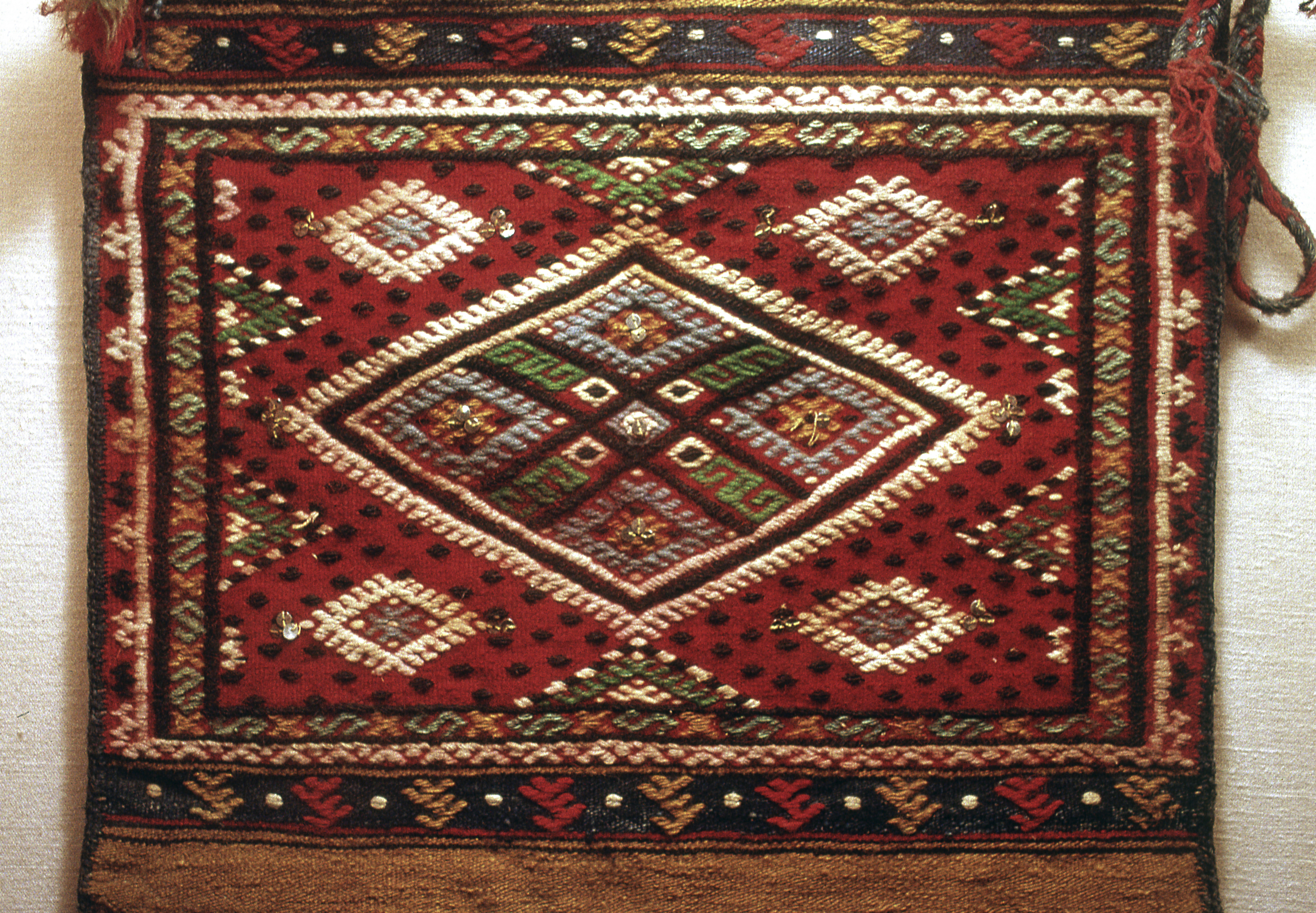
Isparta museum saddle bag part 025

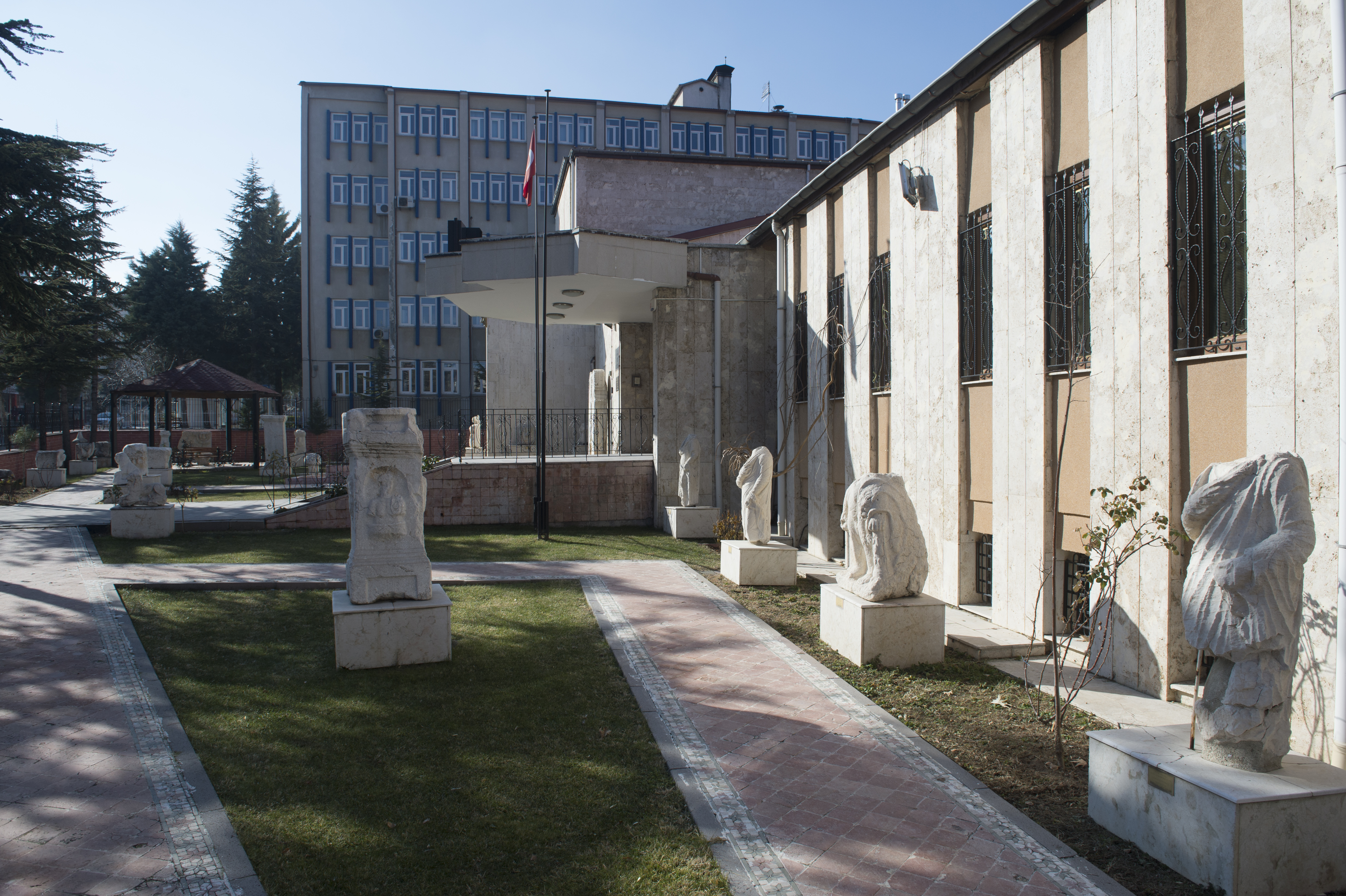
Isparta museum side 5004
