= Şaphane District =

District of Kütahya Province, Turkey

- District
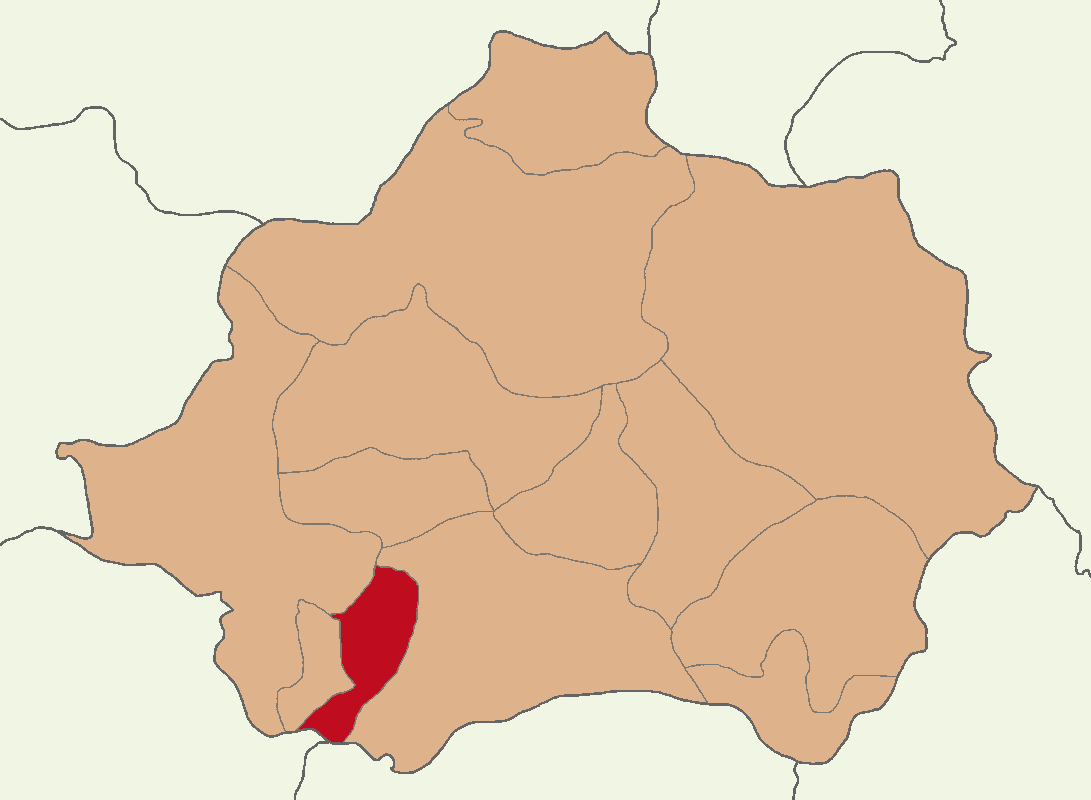
- Map showing Şaphane District in Kütahya Province

- Location in Turkey Şaphane District (Turkey Aegean)
- Coordinates: 39°02′N 29°13′E
- Country: Turkey
- Province: Kütahya
- Seat: Şaphane

Government
  - Kaymakam: Burhanettin Yavaşi
- Area: 229 km^{2} (88 sq mi)
- Population (2022): 5,695
  - Density: 24.9/km^{2} (64.4/sq mi)
- Time zone: UTC+3 (TRT)
- Website: www.saphane.gov.tr

Şaphane District is a district of the Kütahya Province of Turkey. Its seat is the town of Şaphane. Its area is 229 km^{2}, and its population is 5,695 (2022).

== Composition ==
There is one municipality in Şaphane District:

- Şaphane

There are 12 villages in Şaphane District:

- Ayvacık
- Çamköy
- Değirmendere
- Gaipler
- Gürkuyu
- İnceğiz
- Karakür
- Karamanca
- Karamustafalar
- Kızılkoltuk
- Üçbaş
- Uğurlugüme
