= Tunçbilek =

- Municipality
- Location in Turkey Tunçbilek (Turkey Aegean)
- Coordinates: 39°37′30″N 29°27′57″E
- Country: Turkey
- Province: Kütahya
- District: Tavşanlı
- Population (2022): 4,525
- Time zone: UTC+3 (TRT)

Tunçbilek is a town (belde) in the Tavşanlı District, Kütahya Province, Turkey. Its population is 4,525 (2022). Ömerler coal mine is nearby.
