= Uğurlugüme =

Village in Kütahya Province, Turkey

Coordinates: 38°58′11″N 29°11′09″E

Uğurlugüme is a village (officially a neighborhood) in Şaphane District, Kütahya Province, Turkey. Its population is 89 (2025).

== Background ==
The name of the village means literally "fortunate guardhouse" or "fortunate hunter's hut" (Turkish: uğurlu + güme).

East of the village is a one-arched Roman bridge, possibly part of the Roman Aezani-Sebaste road.
