= Tavşanlı District =

District of Kütahya Province, Turkey

- District
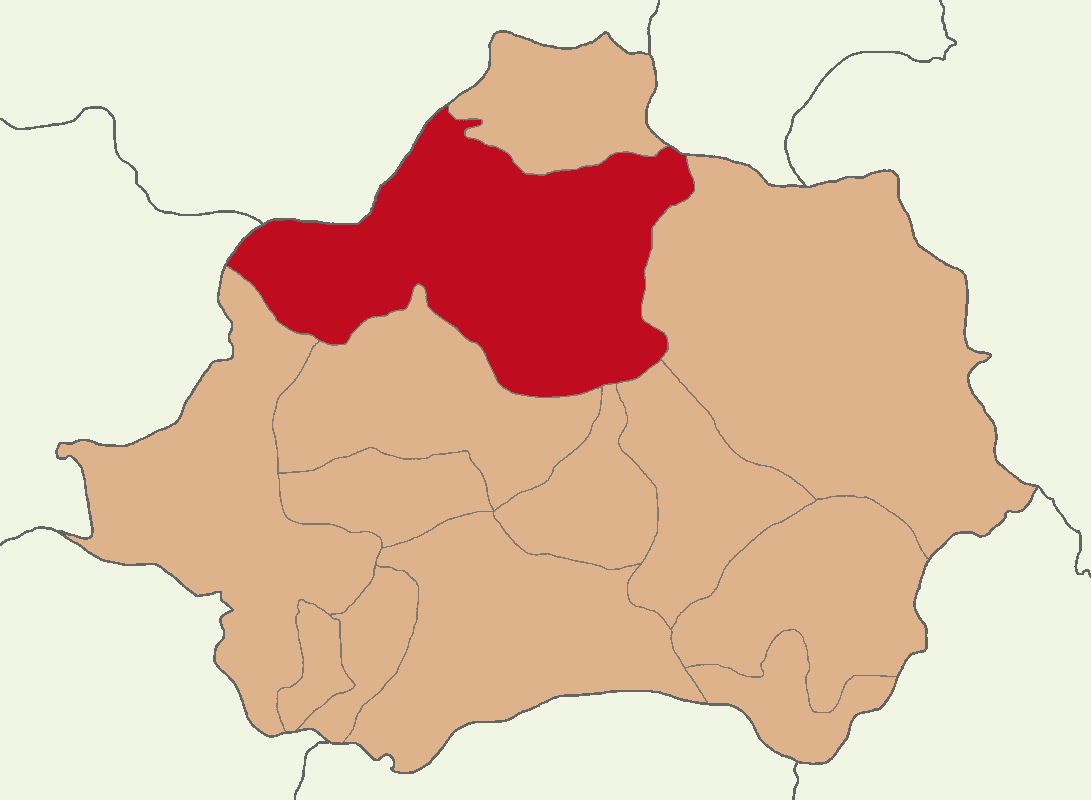
- Map showing Tavşanlı District in Kütahya Province

- Location in Turkey Tavşanlı District (Turkey Aegean)
- Coordinates: 39°32′N 29°29′E
- Country: Turkey
- Province: Kütahya
- Seat: Tavşanlı

Government
  - Kaymakam: Hayrettin Baskın
- Area: 1,899 km^{2} (733 sq mi)
- Population (2022): 100,568
  - Density: 53/km^{2} (140/sq mi)
- Time zone: UTC+3 (TRT)
- Website: www.tavsanli.gov.tr

Tavşanlı District is a district of the Kütahya Province of Turkey. Its seat is the city of Tavşanlı. Its area is 1,899 km^{2}, and its population is 100,568 (2022).

== Composition ==
There are five municipalities in Tavşanlı District:

- Balıköy
- Kuruçay
- Tavşanlı
- Tepecik
- Tunçbilek

There are 87 villages in Tavşanlı District:

- Ağaköy
- Akçaköy
- Akçaşehir
- Aliköy
- Altınova
- Arifler
- Artıranlar
- Avcılar
- Aydınlar
- Ayvalı
- Başköy
- Bozbelen
- Burhan
- Çakıllı
- Çaldibi
- Çaltılı
- Çamalan
- Çayırköy
- Çayıroluk
- Çıkrıcak
- Çınarcık
- Çobanköy
- Çobanlar
- Dağdemirli
- Değirmisaz
- Derbent
- Derecik
- Devekayası
- Doğanlar
- Dudaş
- Dümrekhüseyinpaşa
- Dümrekorta
- Dümrekuluköy
- Dutlar
- Eğriöz
- Elmaağacı
- Elmalı
- Emirler
- Erikli
- Eşen
- Gazelyakup
- Gevrekler
- Göbel
- Gökçeyurt
- Gölcük
- Gümüşgölcük
- Gümüşyeniköy
- İsaköy
- Karacakaş
- Karakaya
- Karakişi
- Karaköy
- Karapelit
- Karcık
- Kargılı
- Karlı
- Kavaklı
- Kayaarası
- Kayı
- Kırkkavak
- Kışlademirli
- Kızılbük
- Kızılçukur
- Kocayeri
- Köprücek
- Köreken
- Köseler
- Kozluca
- Madanlar
- Nusretler
- Öksüzler
- Opanözü
- Ören
- Ovacık
- Şahin
- Şahmelek
- Şapçı
- Şapçıdede
- Sekbandemirli
- Şenlik
- Uluçam
- Üyücek
- Vakıf
- Yağmurlu
- Yataklı
- Yeniköy
- Yörgüç
