= Kemal Zeytinoğlu =

Turkish engineer and politician (1911–1959)

Minister of Public Works
- In office 22 December 1950 – 1955
- Prime Minister: Adnan Menderes

Personal details
- Born: 1911 Kütahya, Ottoman Empire
- Died: 17 February 1959 (aged 47–48) Jordan's Wood, Newdigate, Surrey, England
- Resting place: Eskişehir, Turkey
- Party: Democrat Party (1946–1960)
- Children: 2

Kemal Zeytinoğlu (1911–1959) was a Turkish engineer and politician being a member of the Democrat Party (DP). He assumed various cabinet posts in the 1950s under Prime Minister Adnan Menderes. He died in a plane crash in the United Kingdom.

== Early life and education ==
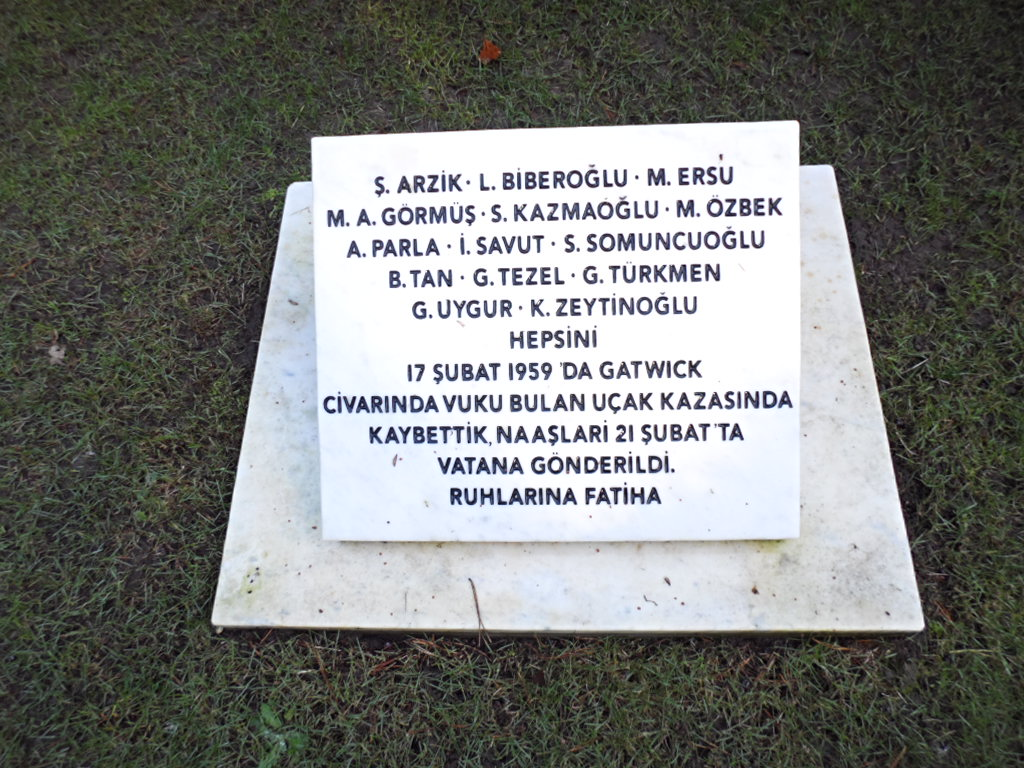
The memorial to the victims in the Turkish Airforce plot at Brookwood Cemetery

Zeytinoğlu was born in Kütahya in 1911. His father was a businessman, Mesut Zeytinoğlu. The family hailed from Tavşanlı, Kütahya. His brother, Aziz, was also a politician and served as a deputy between 1961 and 1969. His younger brother was Mümtaz Zeytinoğlu, a businessman who died in a road accident in February 1979.

He graduated from Istanbul Engineering School and received a PhD in civil engineering in Vienna.

== Career ==
Following his graduation Zeytinoğlu worked as a civil engineer in Eskişehir. In 1946 he joined the newly founded Democrat Party and took part in the establishment of its Eskişehir organization. He was first elected as a deputy for Eskişehir in 1946 election and served at the Parliament during the 8th legislature. He also served at the Parliament in the 9th and 10th legislatures.

Zeytinoğlu was first appointed minister of public works on 22 December 1950 and remained in office in the three successive cabinets led by Adnan Menderes (19th cabinet, 20th cabinet and 21st cabinet).

== Personal life and death ==
He was married and had two children.

Zeytinoğlu was accompanying Prime Minister Adnan Menderes in a state visit on the Cyprus issue to be held in London on 17 February 1959. The plane crashed in Jordan's Wood, Newdigate, Surrey, near London Gatwick Airport, and killed Zeytinoğlu and thirteen other Turkish officials, including crew members. Menderes survived the accident. Zeytinoğlu's body was brought to Ankara by the British Air Force plane and then, to Eskişehir by train for burial which took place on 24 February.

== Legacy ==
There are many streets named after him in Tavşanlı, Kütahya, and Eskişehir.
