= Kuruçay, Tavşanlı =

Kuruçay
- Municipality
- Location in Turkey Kuruçay (Turkey Aegean)
- Coordinates: 39°30′14″N 29°30′53″E
- Country: Turkey
- Province: Kütahya
- District: Tavşanlı
- Population (2022): 1,793
- Time zone: UTC+3 (TRT)

Kuruçay is a town (belde) in the Tavşanlı District, Kütahya Province, Turkey. Its population is 1,793 (2022).
