= Tepecik, Tavşanlı =

Tepecik
- Municipality
- Location in Turkey Tepecik (Turkey Aegean)
- Coordinates: 39°31′28″N 29°27′42″E
- Country: Turkey
- Province: Kütahya
- District: Tavşanlı
- Population (2022): 2,647
- Time zone: UTC+3 (TRT)

Tepecik is a town (belde) in the Tavşanlı District, Kütahya Province, Turkey. Its population is 2,647 (2022).
