= Güney, Simav =

Güney
- Municipality
- Location in Turkey Güney (Turkey Aegean)
- Coordinates: 39°10′58″N 28°55′01″E
- Country: Turkey
- Province: Kütahya
- District: Simav
- Population (2022): 1,555
- Time zone: UTC+3 (TRT)

Güney is a town (belde) in the Simav District, Kütahya Province, Turkey. Its population is 1,555 (2022).
