= Demirci, Simav =

Demirci
- Municipality
- Location in Turkey Demirci (Turkey Aegean)
- Coordinates: 39°06′06″N 28°55′04″E
- Country: Turkey
- Province: Kütahya
- District: Simav
- Population (2022): 2,383
- Time zone: UTC+3 (TRT)

Demirci is a town (belde) in the Simav District, Kütahya Province, Turkey. Its population is 2,383 (2022).
