= Akdağ, Simav =

Akdağ
- Municipality
- Location in Turkey Akdağ (Turkey Aegean)
- Coordinates: 39°11′23″N 28°52′32″E
- Country: Turkey
- Province: Kütahya
- District: Simav
- Population (2022): 1,885
- Time zone: UTC+3 (TRT)

Akdağ is a town (belde) in the Simav District, Kütahya Province, Turkey. Its population is 1,885 (2022).
