= Tavşanlı =

- Municipality
- Location in Turkey Tavşanlı (Turkey Aegean)
- Coordinates: 39°32′N 29°29′E
- Country: Turkey
- Province: Kütahya
- District: Tavşanlı

Government
  - Mayor: Ali Kemal Derin (YRP)
- Population (2022): 73,306
- Time zone: UTC+3 (TRT)
- Postal code: 43300
- Area code: 0274
- Website: www.tavsanli.bel.tr

Tavşanlı is a city in Kütahya Province in the Aegean region of Turkey. It is the seat of Tavşanlı District. Its population is 73,306 (2022).

Tavşanlı is a typical Aegean town where a government-owned coal mine company attracted thousands of settlers from surrounding cities and villages.

The town is known for its notable number of jewellery shops, and for a popular snack called "leblebi" (roasted chickpeas).

== Name ==
Tavşanlı is said to be named after a hunting party held by the Ottoman prince Bayezid I, in which he is said to have hunted seven rabbits. Thus the name Tavşanlı, meaning "the place with rabbits", was given to the area.

== Places of interest ==
50 km (31 mi) west of Kütahya lies the ancient town of Tavşanlı with a notable 12th-century Seljuq mosque called Ulucami. 18 km (11 mi) to the north in a side valley of the Adronos stream stands a Phrygian rock monument Dikilitaş, a huge volcanic partly smoothed rock with geometric designs.

== Archaeology ==
Tavşanlı Höyük is a massive mound of more than 40 hectares, located in the centre of the Tavşanlı Plain. It is the largest mound in this region, located near the Orhaneli river (de:Orhaneli Çayı). The settlement started during the Neolithic Period, but most of the remains belong to the Bronze Age.

The excavations here started in 2017, as part of the “Prehistoric Periods Survey of Eskişehir and Kütahya Provinces (EKAR)” project. They revealed that most of the mound occupation belongs to the Early Bronze Age II (2700-2400 BC), after which there was a great fire outbreak during the Early Bronze Age III period.

The mound contains remains from the Middle Bronze Age, Late Bronze Age, and Early Iron Age. Early Bronze Age pottery is mostly concentrated on the eastern and north-eastern parts of the mound.

Tavşanlı Höyük city building layout is somewhere in between the “Anatolian Settlement Plan”, as defined by M. Korfmann, and the layout that was common in the coastal zone of Western Anatolia and in the Aegean Islands. But Tavsanli is actually somewhat closer to Inland Western Anatolia in this regard.

The “Anatolian Settlement Plan” also known as the “Inland Western Anatolian Settlement Model” represents "an enclosed system where the houses open to a common courtyard facing each other, or where the backsides of the houses function as an enclosure wall." On the other hand, the Aegean-coastal settlements were in the form of "clusters of houses (insulae) around the streets and alleys".

4,200-year-old hazelnuts, as well as the marble figurines were found by the excavators in 2022.

Mycenaean type seal and a dagger were also discovered here in 2022.

== Climate ==
Tavşanlı has a hot-summer Mediterranean climate (Köppen: Csa), with hot, dry summers, and cold winters.

Climate data for Tavşanlı (1991–2020)
Month	Jan	Feb	Mar	Apr	May	Jun	Jul	Aug	Sep	Oct	Nov	Dec	Year
Mean daily maximum °C (°F)	6.7 (44.1)	9.0 (48.2)	13.0 (55.4)	17.9 (64.2)	23.5 (74.3)	27.8 (82.0)	31.5 (88.7)	31.9 (89.4)	27.4 (81.3)	21.5 (70.7)	14.8 (58.6)	8.5 (47.3)	19.5 (67.1)
Daily mean °C (°F)	1.3 (34.3)	2.8 (37.0)	6.0 (42.8)	10.4 (50.7)	15.4 (59.7)	19.3 (66.7)	22.4 (72.3)	22.3 (72.1)	18.0 (64.4)	12.9 (55.2)	7.3 (45.1)	3.1 (37.6)	11.8 (53.2)
Mean daily minimum °C (°F)	−2.9 (26.8)	−2.2 (28.0)	0.0 (32.0)	3.5 (38.3)	7.8 (46.0)	11.0 (51.8)	13.2 (55.8)	13.3 (55.9)	9.4 (48.9)	5.8 (42.4)	1.3 (34.3)	−1.2 (29.8)	5.0 (41.0)
Average precipitation mm (inches)	49.92 (1.97)	45.55 (1.79)	49.06 (1.93)	51.06 (2.01)	53.25 (2.10)	46.73 (1.84)	18.66 (0.73)	25.4 (1.00)	24.91 (0.98)	43.23 (1.70)	41.03 (1.62)	52.77 (2.08)	501.57 (19.75)
Average precipitation days (≥ 1.0 mm)	7.6	7.4	8.1	7.5	7.7	5.6	2.6	3.0	3.8	6.0	6.5	8.3	74.1
Average relative humidity (%)	77.7	73.4	68.1	65.3	65.1	63.4	58.2	59.5	62.4	68.9	71.7	77.9	67.6
Source: NOAA

== Notable people ==
- Mustafa Kalemli, physician and politician
- Kemal Zeytinoğlu, engineer and politician
