= Kuşu =

- Municipality
- Location in Turkey Kuşu (Turkey Aegean)
- Coordinates: 38°57′50″N 29°01′45″E
- Country: Turkey
- Province: Kütahya
- District: Simav
- Population (2022): 1,952
- Time zone: UTC+3 (TRT)

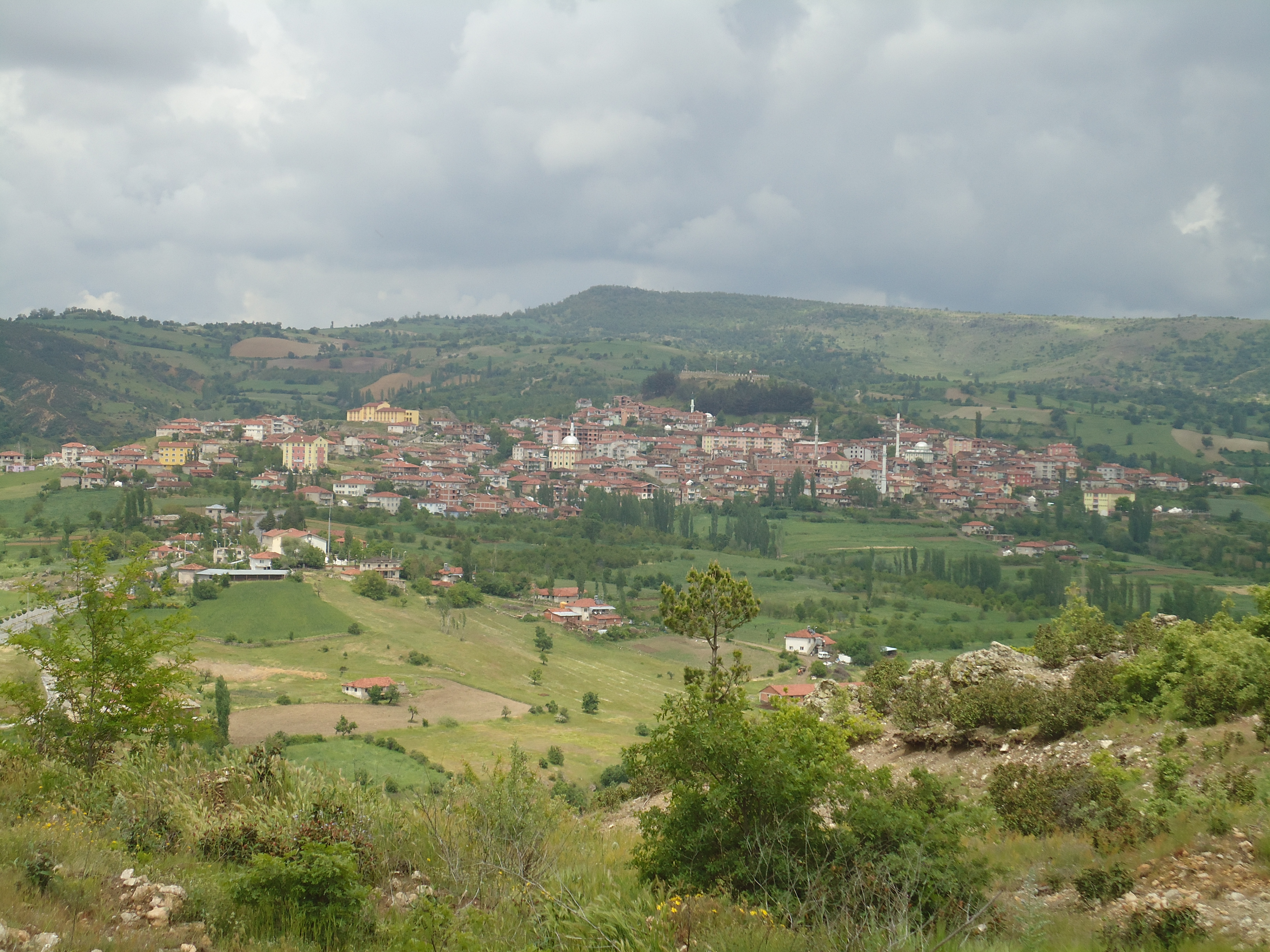
Panoramic photograph of the community.

Kuşu is a town (belde) in the Simav District, Kütahya Province, Turkey. Its population is 1,952 (2022).
