= Balıköy =

- Municipality
- Location in Turkey Balıköy (Turkey Aegean)
- Coordinates: 39°31′22″N 29°05′44″E
- Country: Turkey
- Province: Kütahya
- District: Tavşanlı
- Population (2022): 1,497
- Time zone: UTC+3 (TRT)

Balıköy is a town (belde) in the Tavşanlı District, Kütahya Province, Turkey. Its population is 1,497 (2022).
