= Çitgöl =

- Municipality
- Location in Turkey Çitgöl (Turkey Aegean)
- Coordinates: 39°07′22″N 28°57′04″E
- Country: Turkey
- Province: Kütahya
- District: Simav
- Population (2022): 3,515
- Time zone: UTC+3 (TRT)

Çitgöl is a town (belde) in the Simav District, Kütahya Province, Turkey. Its population is 3,515 (2022).
