= Gördes =

- District and municipality
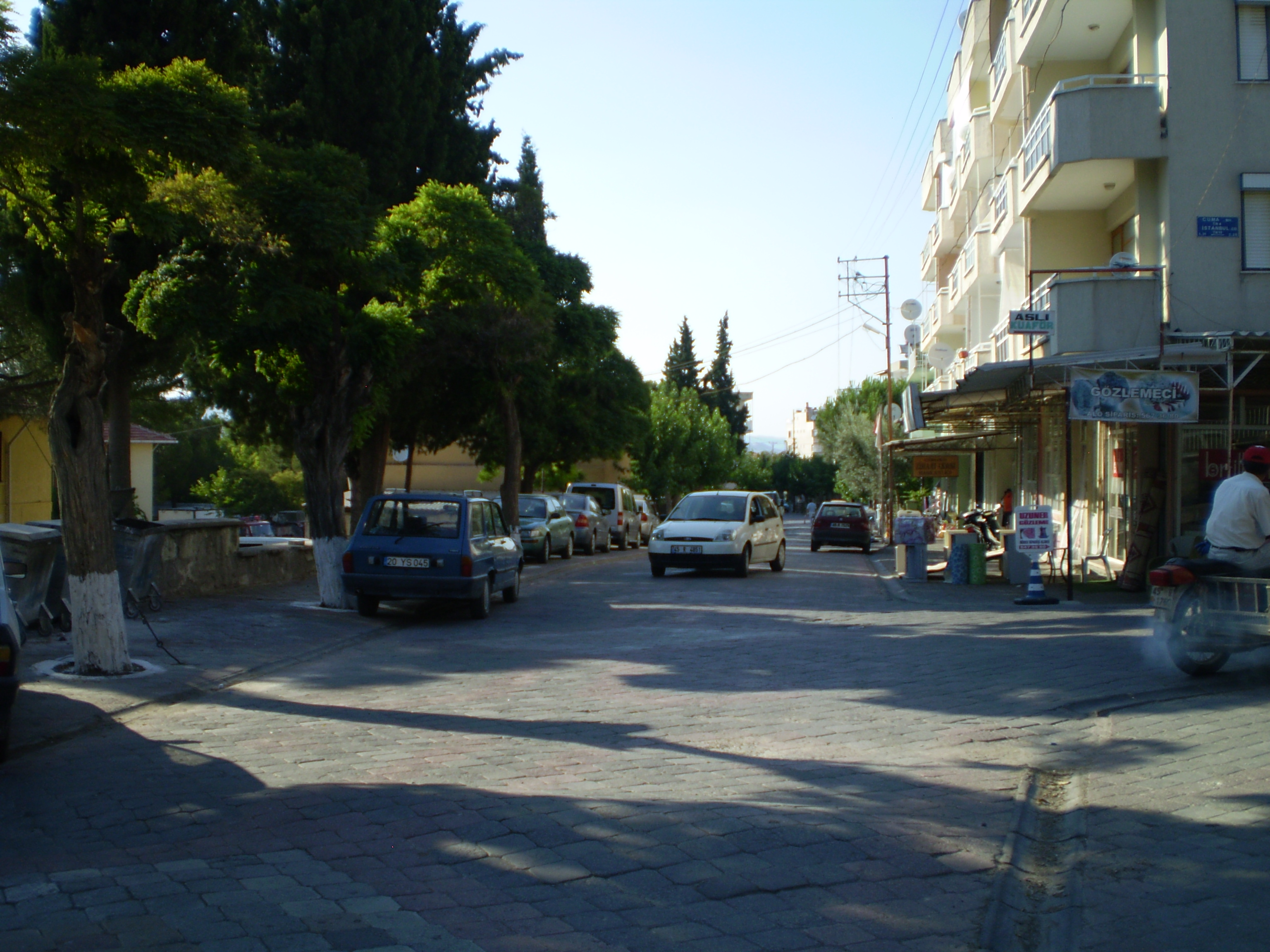

- Map showing Gördes District in Manisa Province

- Location within Turkey Location within Turkey Aegean
- Coordinates: 38°55′58″N 28°17′25″E
- Country: Turkey
- Province: Manisa

Government
  - Mayor: İbrahim Büke (CHP)
- Area: 902 km^{2} (348 sq mi)
- Elevation: 670 m (2,200 ft)
- Population (2022): 26,458
  - Density: 29.3/km^{2} (76.0/sq mi)
- Time zone: UTC+3 (TRT)
- Postal code: 45750
- Area code: 0236
- Climate: Csa
- Website: www.gordes.bel.tr

Gördes is a municipality and district of Manisa Province, Turkey. Its area is 902 km^{2}, and its population is 26,458 (2022). The town lies at an elevation of 670 m (2,198 ft).

== History ==
Gördes has been held by the Persians, Macedonians, Roman and Byzantine empires, and in 1071AD passed to the Turks. From 1867 until 1922, Gördes was part of the Aidin Vilayet of the Ottoman Empire.

== Composition ==
There are 64 neighbourhoods in Gördes District:

- Adnan Menderes
- Akpınar
- Atatürk
- Balıklı
- Bayat
- Beğel
- Beğenler
- Benlieli
- Beşeylül
- Börez
- Boyalı
- Çağlayan
- Çatalarmut
- Çiçekli
- Çiğiller
- Cuma
- Dalkara
- Dargıl
- Deliçoban
- Dereçiftlik
- Dikilitaş
- Divan
- Doğanpınar
- Dutluca
- Efendili
- Evciler
- Fundacık
- Gülpınar
- Güneşli
- Hüseynibaba
- Kabakoz
- Kalemoğlu
- Karaağaç
- Karakeçili
- Karayağcı
- Karayakup
- Kaşıkçı
- Kayacık
- Kılcanlar
- Kıranköy
- Kıymık
- Kızıldam
- Kobaklar
- Korubaşı
- Köseler
- Kürekçi
- Kuşlukköy
- Kuyucakkarapınar
- Malaz
- Malkoca
- Nakıpağa
- Oğulduruk
- Pınarbaşı
- Şahinkaya
- Salur
- Sarıaliler
- Şeyhyayla
- Tepeköy
- Tüpüler
- Ulgar
- Uzunçam
- Yakaköy
- Yeniköy
- Yeşilyurt

== Economy ==
Gördes is one of the handmade Turkish carpet production centers in Manisa. Gördes carpets have different pattern and styles. See: Ghiordes knot.

The main source of income is tobacco and poppy production and wheat, barley is grown. In recent years production of cherries, strawberries has begun production. Other crops include potatoes, peas, tomatoes and cucumbers and wine.

In addition, olive, quince and persimmon cultivation are also carried out in Gördes.

The area has mining with Coal and Zeolite being the main deposits but kaolin, nickel-iron, titanium beds are also available. In addition, feldspar, marble, kyanite, chalcedony, Chromium, quartz and boron are among the minerals mined in the region.

== Notable Natives ==
- Gördesli Makbule (1902-1922), guerilla fighter
