= Naşa =

- Municipality
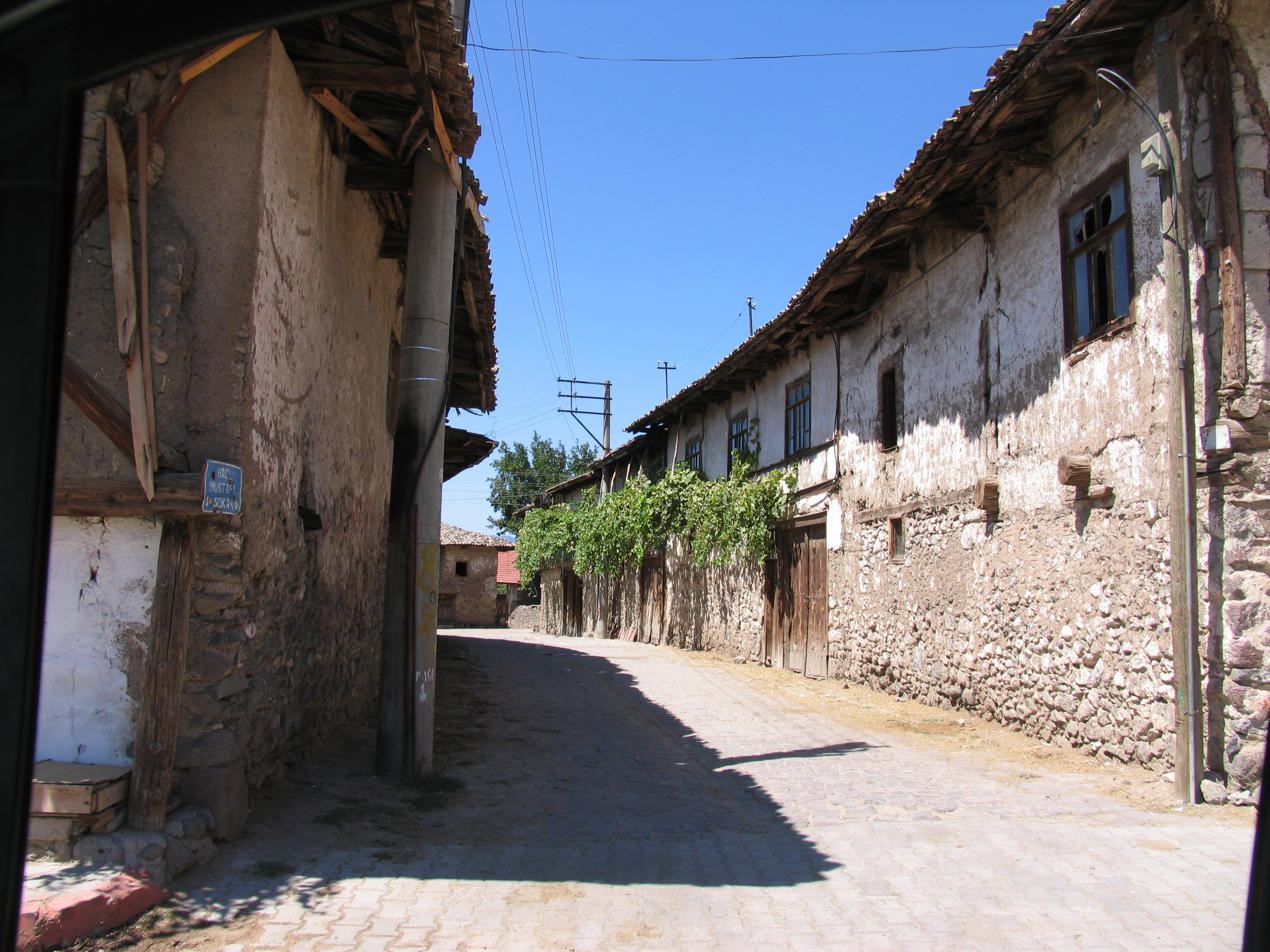
- Old houses in Naşa

- Location within Turkey Location within Turkey Aegean
- Coordinates: 39°09′35″N 28°58′04″E
- Country: Turkey
- Province: Kütahya
- District: Simav
- Population (2022): 1,864
- Time zone: UTC+3 (TRT)

Naşa is a town (belde) in the Simav District, Kütahya Province, Turkey. Its population is 1,864 (2022).
