= Ömerler coal mine =

Coal mine in Turkey

Ömerler coal mine is an underground coal mine in Kütahya Province, Turkey.
