= Şaphane =

- Municipality
- Location in Turkey Şaphane (Turkey Aegean)
- Coordinates: 39°01′40″N 29°13′22″E
- Country: Turkey
- Province: Kütahya
- District: Şaphane

Government
  - Mayor: Lütfi Mutlu (CHP)
- Elevation: 1,128 m (3,701 ft)
- Population (2022): 2,853
- Time zone: UTC+3 (TRT)
- Area code: 0274
- Website: www.saphane.bel.tr

Şaphane, formerly Abşeker, is a town in Kütahya Province in the Aegean region of Turkey. It is the seat of Şaphane District. Its population is 2,853 (2022). Its elevation is 1,128 m (3,701 ft).

== Tourism ==
Mt. Şaphane (Akdağ) is open for the mountain tourism with its plateaus that are rich for their oxygen levels. It is 2,121 meters (6,959 ft) high and on a 100,000-hectare (250,000-acre) area with 20,000 hectares (49,000 acres) of new planting parts. Paragliding and trekking are some of the activities you can do on Mt. Şaphane. Kocaseyfullah Mosque is one of our historical spots with its age dating back to 700 years. It is inherited from Anatolian Seljuks. We also have Agha Mansions on which some investments can be directed. We have profitable thermal water sources in Karacaderbent ward of Şaphane where some thermal villages, hotels and physical therapy clinic projects can be done.

== Medicinal herbs ==
On Mount Şaphane, there is a variety of medicinal herbs like thyme, sage, linden tree, Ayvadanası, Filistan herb, nigella sativa, urtica dioica, daisy, Papaver rhoeas, sand rose, etc., and many kinds of unexplored plant families.

== Cherry and sour cherry ==
In the district, cherry and sour cherry are cultivated using waterless agricultural methods. There is a quality policy over world standards with 2000 tons of cherry and 7000 tons of sour cherry exported. The district is open for investments for both industry ( fruit juice – concentrate – marmalade – jam) and export.

== Mines ==
=== Alum ===
There is alum mine in the district and the mine area is possessed by Dostel Inc. and it gives 50,000 tons of total production amount per year.

=== Aluminium sulphate ===
65000 tons of aluminium sulfate (Al_{2}SO_{4}) has been produced by Dostel Inc. in the district. This product is sold mainly to İSKİ and ASKİ. It is also purchased by metropolitan municipalities and standard municipalities’ water authority units and paper factories.

=== Gold ===
It was found out, after 15 drilling works made under 500 meters (1,600 ft) depth conducted by MTA with the provision of ETİBANK in 2000, that gold mine was encountered by the depth of 280 meters (920 ft). This research was carried out by Canadian research centers. The deposit is not developed.

=== Marble ===
There are great quantities of marble and calcite veins under Mt. Şaphane.

=== Wind energy ===
North, south and southwest areas of Mt. Şaphane are appropriate for energy production from wind. This energy potential would be enough for meeting the electric energy needs of the district and nearby districts.

=== Thermal water energy ===
a) 90 °C (194 °F) hot water (30lt/second) was found after drilling works made under 1,326 meters (4,350 ft) depth in Üçbaş sub-district by MTA in 2006. this thermal source has been opened for bid by MTA.

b) 97 °C (207 °F) hot water was found after drilling works made under 1,600 meters (5,200 ft) depth by MTA in 2007 in Karacaderbent Ward that is on Kütahya-Gediz-Simav-Balıkesir-Bursa highway.

MTA has planned activities in this area in its 2009 agenda that TPAO is going to carry out drilling projects by the depth of 4,000 meters (13,000 ft). This area is appealing for both tourism and energy investments because of its proximity to the highway.
