= Simav =

- Municipality
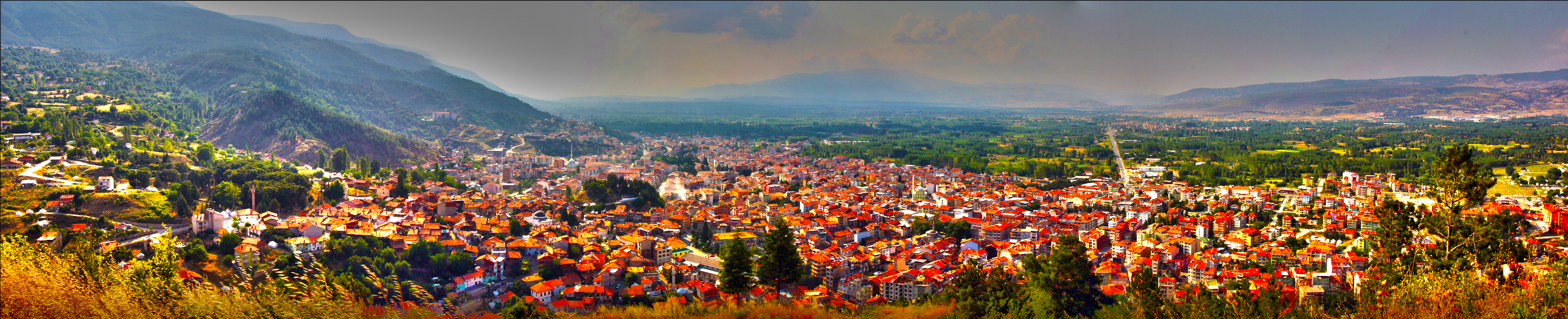
- Panoramic view of Simav

- Location within Turkey Location within Turkey Aegean
- Coordinates: 39°05′N 28°59′E
- Country: Turkey
- Province: Kütahya
- District: Simav

Government
  - Mayor: Kübra Tekel Aktulun (MHP)
- Population (2022): 26,872
- Time zone: UTC+3 (TRT)
- Area code: 0274
- Website: www.simav.bel.tr

Simav is a town in Kütahya Province in the Aegean region of Turkey. It is the seat of Simav District. Its population is 26,872 (2022). The town is located on the Simav River.

== Geography ==
Simav is located 93 km west-southwest of Kütahya, the province capital. It is located on the south side of the Simav valley. To the south, a steep escarpment separates the plain from Simav Mountain, which rises to 1,780 m above sea level. This escarpment follows the Simav Fault, which runs east and west for about 80 km.

About 4 km north of Simav, on the northeastern edge of the plain, is the Simav geothermal field. This field has hot springs at Eynal, Çitgöl, and Naşa. Geothermal energy from this field is used to heat some 6,000 residences in the district (as of 2008) as well as numerous greenhouses. The geothermal system is ultimately caused by the Simav Fault, which penetrates deep into the earth's crust and enables heat to rise up and heat the meteoric water in the area. This water is ultimately derived from a cold spring at Nadarçam, near Simav.

== History ==
Simav was historically called Synaus or Synaos (Ancient Greek: Σύναος), also spelled Synnaus or Synnaos (Σύνναος). In ancient times, it was the main town in Abbaitis, a district in Mysia, and a city in the Roman province of Phrygia Pacatiana. It was also listed as one of the cities in the 6th-century Synekdemos of Hierocles.

The 2013 edition of the Annuario Pontificio puts Synaus in the late Roman province of Phrygia Pacatiana Secumda whose civil capital and metropolitan see was Hierapolis. In the early 20th century, Sophrone Pétridès placed it in Phrygia Pacatiana Prima, whose capital and metropolitan see was Laodicea on the Lycus.

Little is known of the early history of this city, which Ptolemy locates in Great Phrygia, and 6th-century Hierocles, in Phrygia Pacatiana, whose capital was Laodicea. It has a few inscriptions but no ruins.

According to Pétridès, in 1394 the see of Synaus was united to that of Philadelphia (Roman province of Lydia); in the 7th century it was a suffragan of Laodicea on the Lycus (in Phrygia Pacatiana Prima); it seems also that at this time it was united to the see of Ancyra Ferrea (in Phrygia Pacatiana Secunda). In the 9th century it was attached to the metropolis of Hierapolis (capital of Phrygia Pacatiana Secunda) and remained so till its disappearance, as appears from the Greek Notitiae episcopatuum.

Synaos was historically the seat of a Christian bishop, which was subordinate to Laodikeia until sometime around the 9th century, when it was transferred to Hierapolis. A document from 1394 says that the diocese of Synaos was transferred from Hierapolis to the Exarchate of Philadelphia. The diocese of Synaos was almost always mentioned along with neighboring Ankyra, indicating that the two were closely connected.

In 1112, a Turkish force passed through Simav on its way to the west, but it was defeated by Byzantine forces under Konstantinos Gabras at Kelbianon.

The Babuk Bey Külliye was built in Simav in the first half of the 1300s by Babuk Bey, the vizier of the Germiyan beylik. It originally consisted of a mosque, hamam, and han, although only the mosque remains. As of 2019, a restoration project was planned for the hamam. The Dokuzgöz Köprü (Dokuzgöz Bridge) was also built in the 14th century under Germiyan rule. It still stands, although the location of the stream it originally crossed has shifted, so it is no longer functional.

In 1381, a marriage was conducted between the Germiyanid princess Devletşah Hatun and the Ottoman prince (and future sultan) Bayezid I. As part of Devletşah Hatun's dowry, her father, the bey Süleyman Şah, ceded several towns to the Ottomans; Simav was one of them.

The Tapu Defter #438, from the reign of Süleyman the Magnificent, listed Simav as a kazâ in the Sanjak of Kütahya.

From 1867 until 1922, Simav was part of Hüdavendigâr vilayet.

There are two main hills in Simav. The eastern hill is where the ancient acropolis was located, while on the western one are the ruins of a Byzantine-era castle. This castle, today known as Hisar Kalesi, was subsequently used in the Germiyan and Ottoman periods. In the mid-1800s, two towers were still visible along with parts of the walls, but by the turn of the 20th century only some of the walls remained. Today, only a short section of the walls, just over 1 m tall, are still visible on the east side of the hill. The castle may have been shaped like a trapezoid, with the south side about 45 m long and the other three sides about 60 m long. In 2017, an old abandoned tea garden on the site was renovated and turned into a restaurant.

The first school to open in Simav in republican Turkey was the Osmanbey Ilkokulu, which opened in 1926. It is now used as a museum.

On 19 May 2011, Simav was hit by a magnitude 5.9 earthquake. 2 people died, around 100 were injured, and about 2,000 households were either severely damaged or collapsed altogether.

=== Bishops ===
Le Quien mentions the following bishops:

- Arabius, represented by his metropolitan at Chalcedon (451);
- Pronimus, at Constantinople (553);
- Stephanus, at Nicæa (787);
- Constantine at Constantinople (869);
- Sisinnius and Eusebius, supporters respectively of St. Ignatius and Photius, at the Council of Constantinople (879-880);
- Isaac, at the Council of Constantinople (1351), which approved the doctrines of Palamas.

To these may be added Stephanus, whose name occurs in the inscription (8th century?) "Corp. inser. græc.", 8666 perhaps the Stephanus mentioned in 787.

== Climate ==
Simav has a hot-summer Mediterranean climate (Köppen: Csa), with hot, dry summers, and very cool, wet winters. The coldest month (-2, 6 degree) is january in Simav.

Climate data for Simav (1991–2020)
Month	Jan	Feb	Mar	Apr	May	Jun	Jul	Aug	Sep	Oct	Nov	Dec	Year
Mean daily maximum °C (°F)	7.5 (45.5)	9.1 (48.4)	12.7 (54.9)	17.4 (63.3)	22.8 (73.0)	27.2 (81.0)	30.6 (87.1)	30.9 (87.6)	26.6 (79.9)	21.1 (70.0)	15.0 (59.0)	9.3 (48.7)	19.2 (66.6)
Daily mean °C (°F)	2.7 (36.9)	3.9 (39.0)	6.8 (44.2)	10.9 (51.6)	15.6 (60.1)	19.6 (67.3)	22.5 (72.5)	22.4 (72.3)	18.1 (64.6)	13.3 (55.9)	8.1 (46.6)	4.4 (39.9)	12.4 (54.3)
Mean daily minimum °C (°F)	−1.2 (29.8)	−0.3 (31.5)	1.8 (35.2)	5.0 (41.0)	8.7 (47.7)	11.9 (53.4)	14.1 (57.4)	14.0 (57.2)	10.3 (50.5)	7.1 (44.8)	2.9 (37.2)	0.6 (33.1)	6.3 (43.3)
Average precipitation mm (inches)	96.16 (3.79)	92.91 (3.66)	76.52 (3.01)	63.93 (2.52)	49.87 (1.96)	31.05 (1.22)	12.31 (0.48)	14.13 (0.56)	23.65 (0.93)	54.46 (2.14)	78.8 (3.10)	103.6 (4.08)	697.39 (27.46)
Average precipitation days (≥ 1.0 mm)	9.4	8.4	8.5	7.9	7.3	4.9	2.2	2.4	3.4	5.7	6.8	9.5	76.4
Average relative humidity (%)	76.2	73.5	68.6	66.8	64.0	60.7	56.6	58.5	62.8	70.3	71.5	76.0	67.1
Source: NOAA
