= Kütahya =

City in Turkey

- Municipality
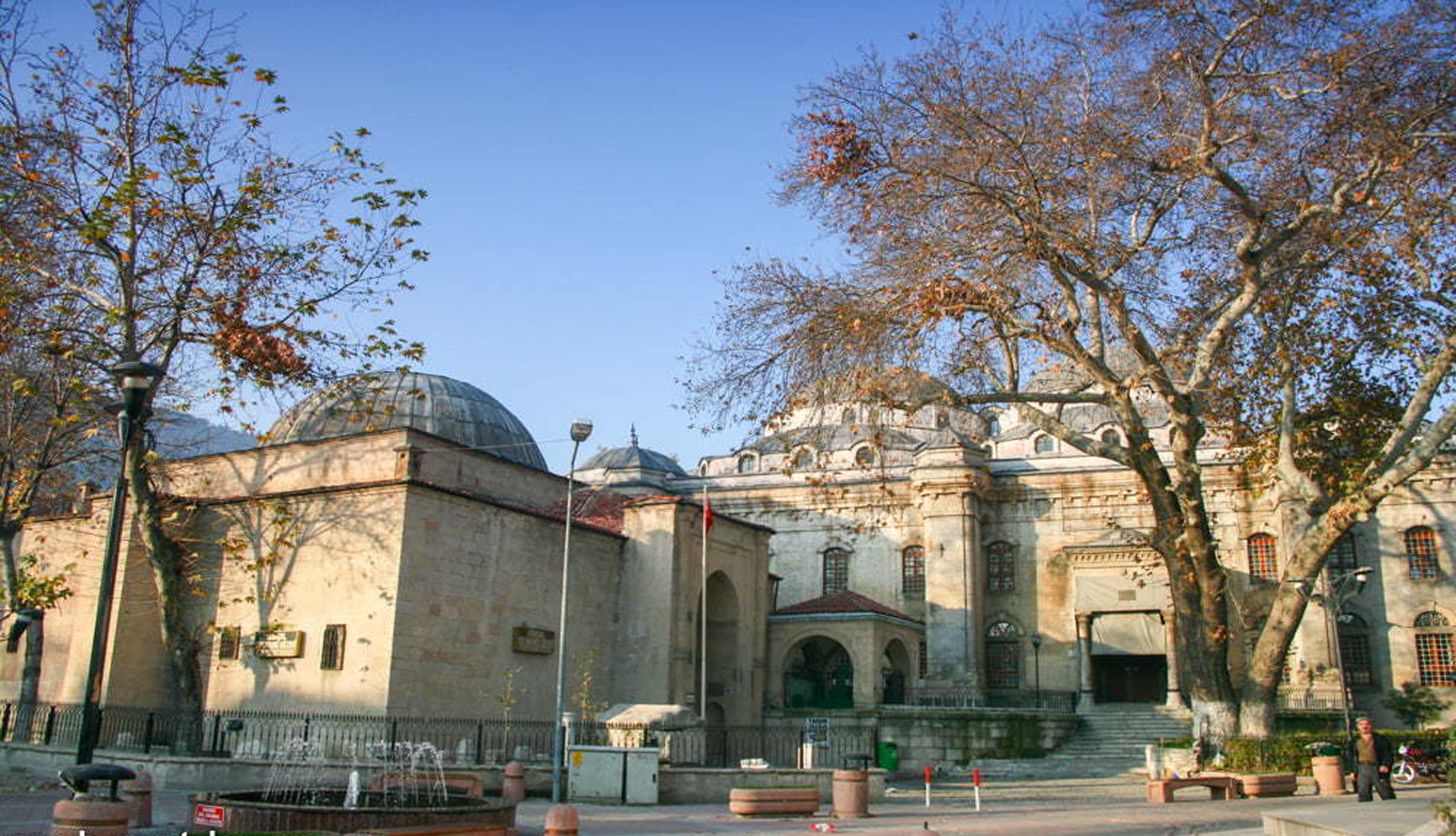
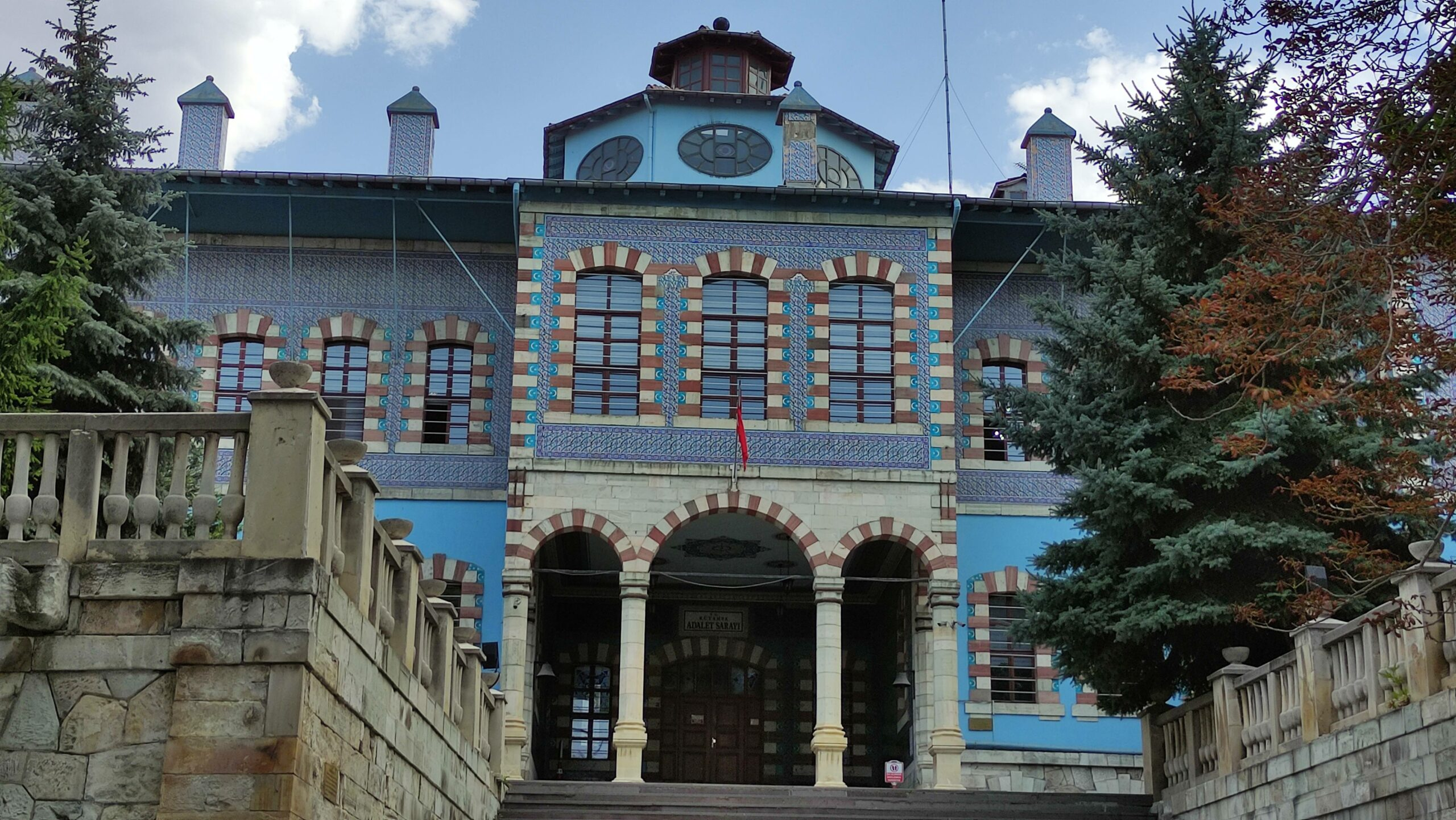
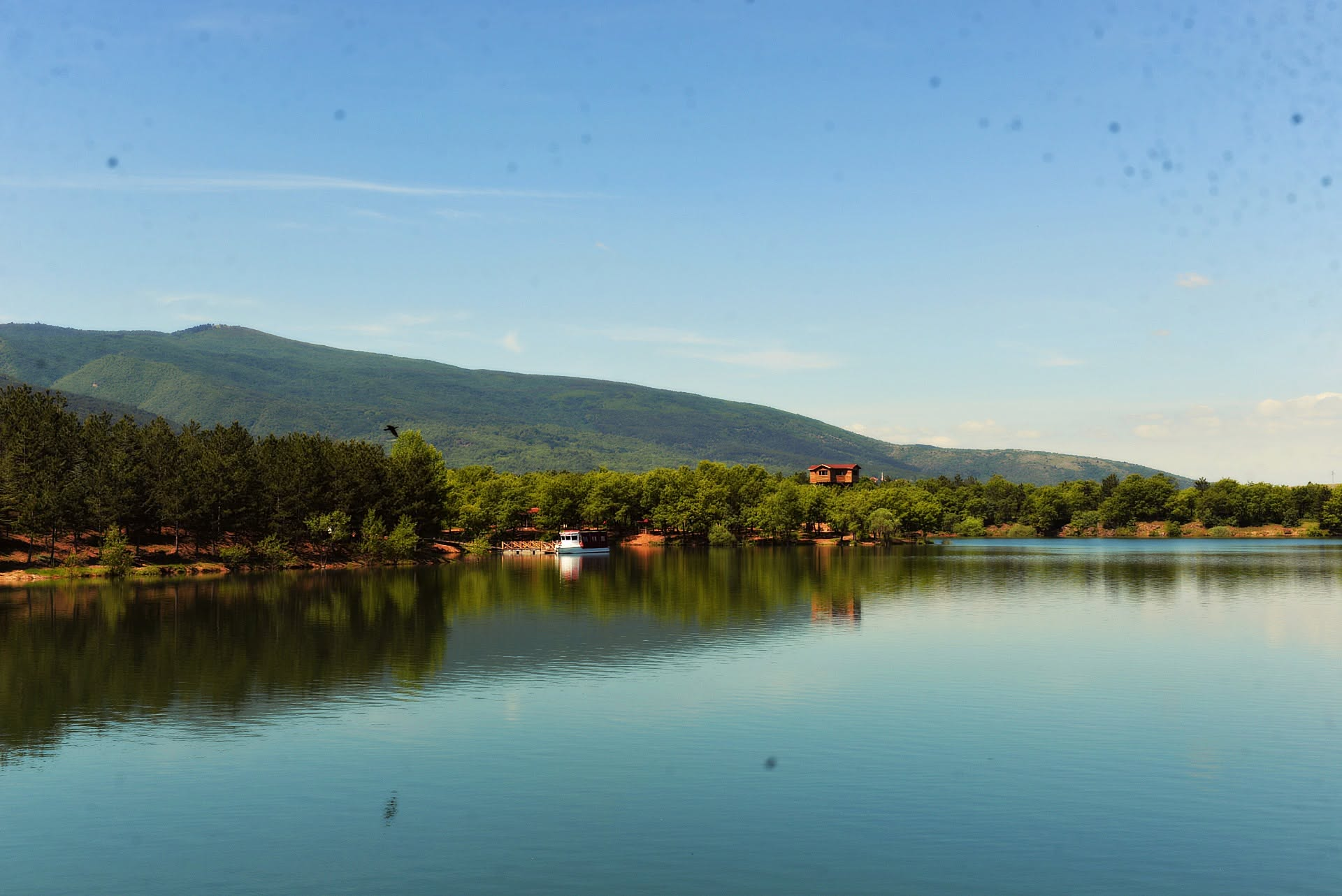
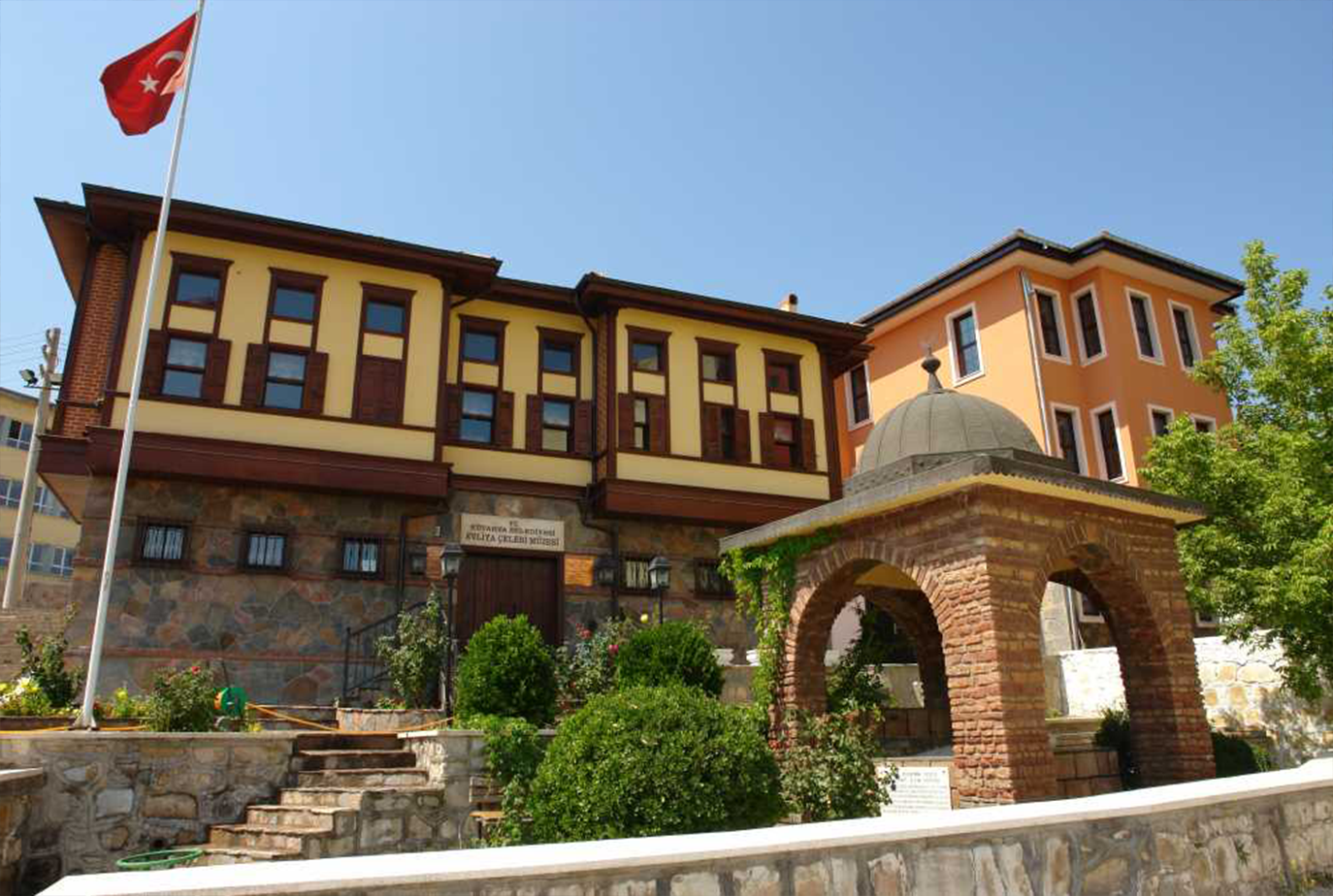
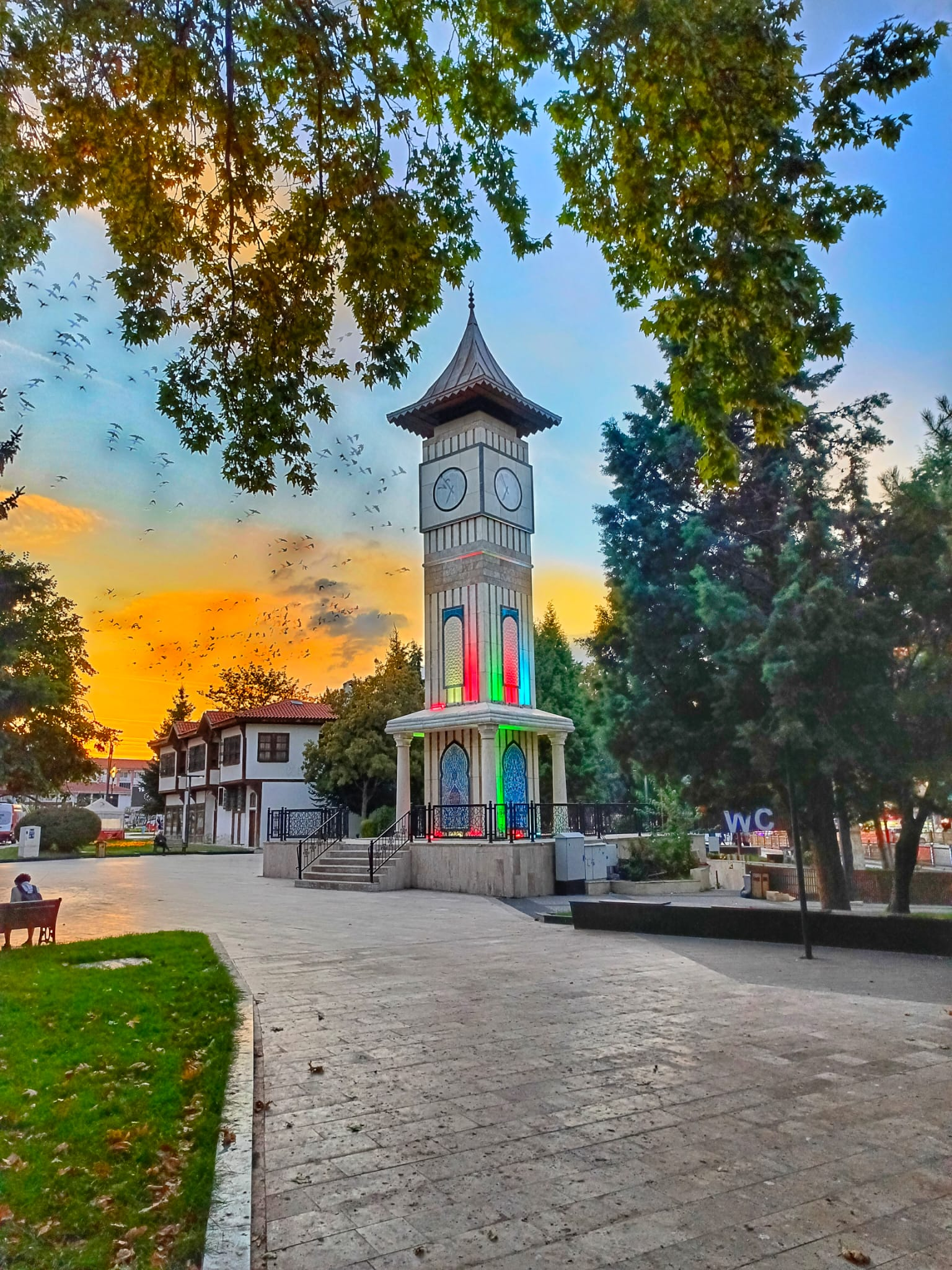
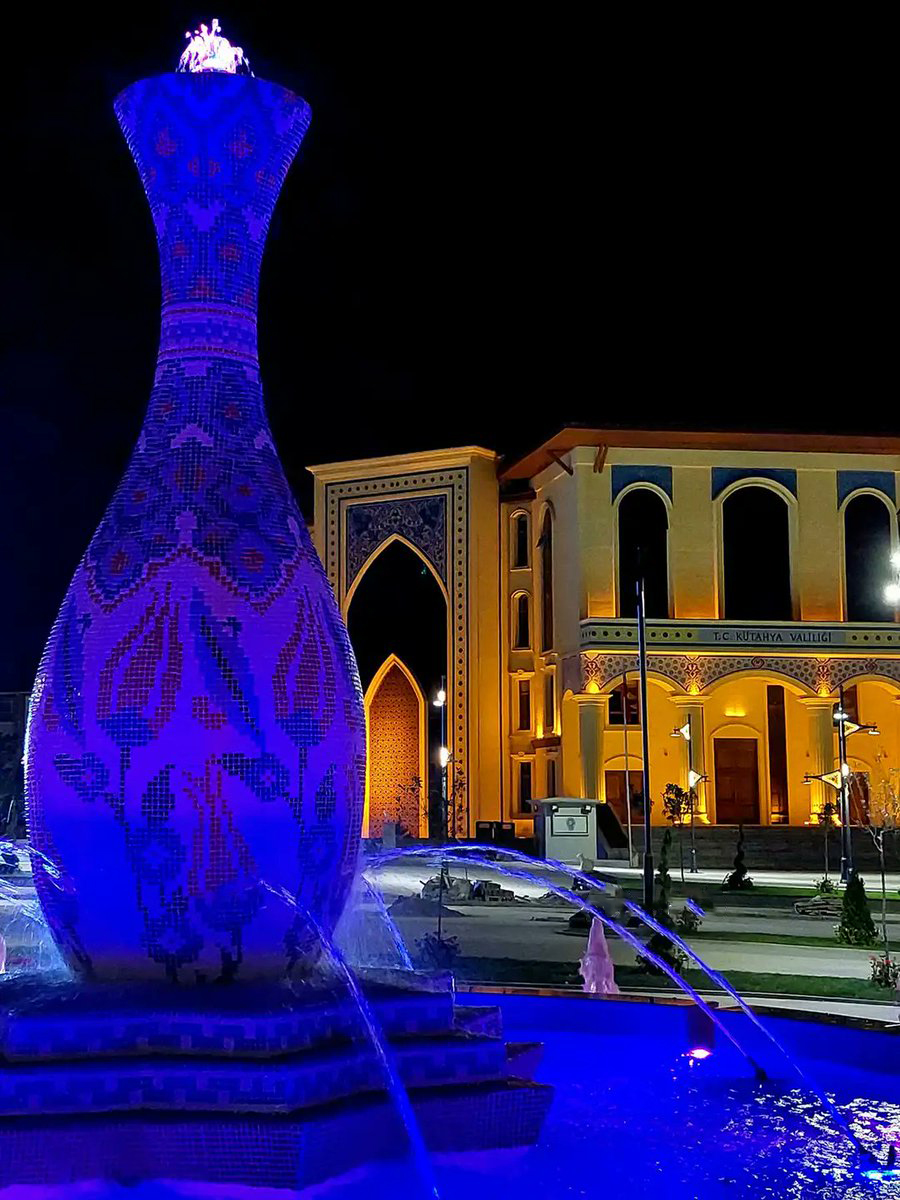
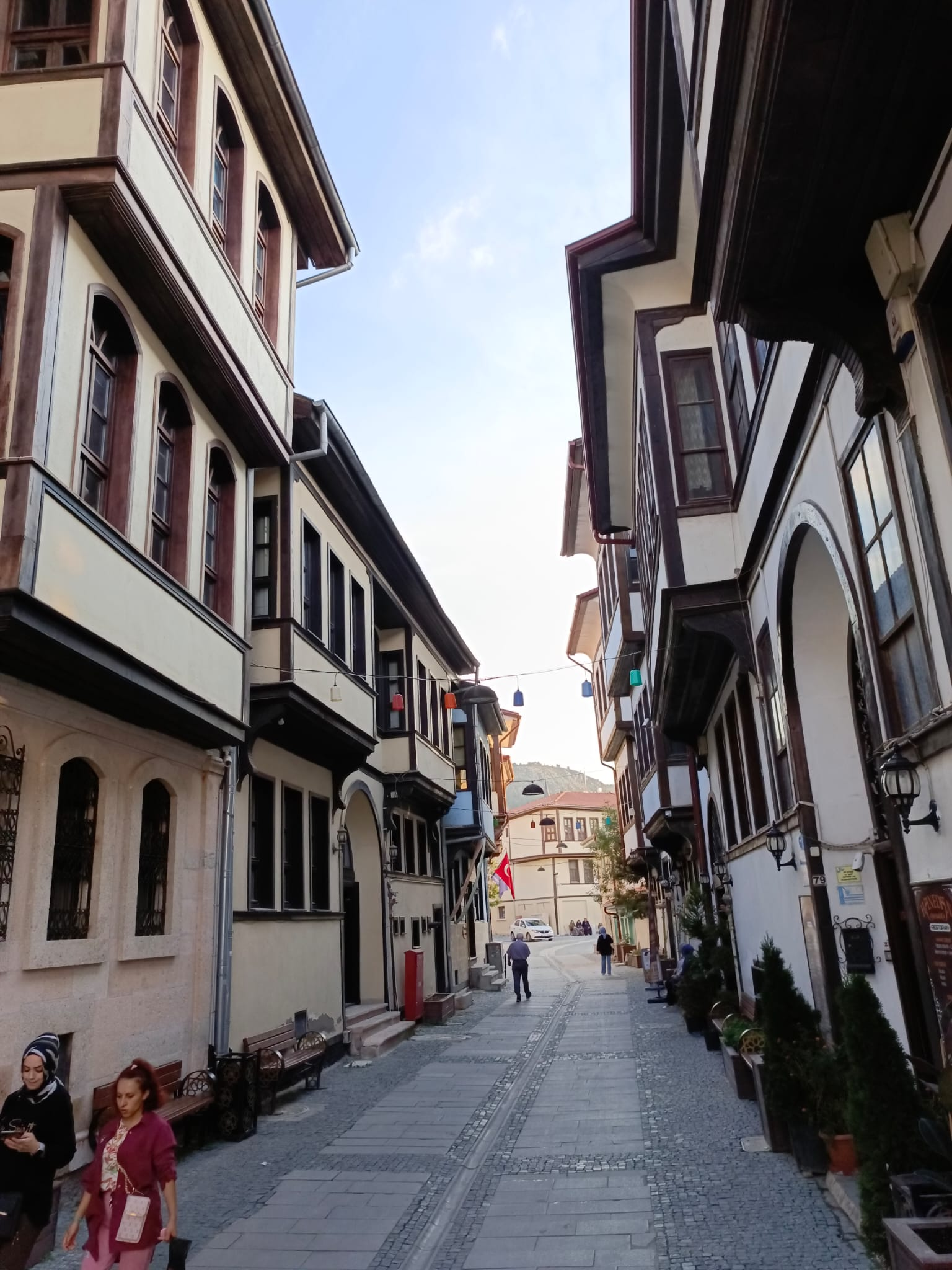
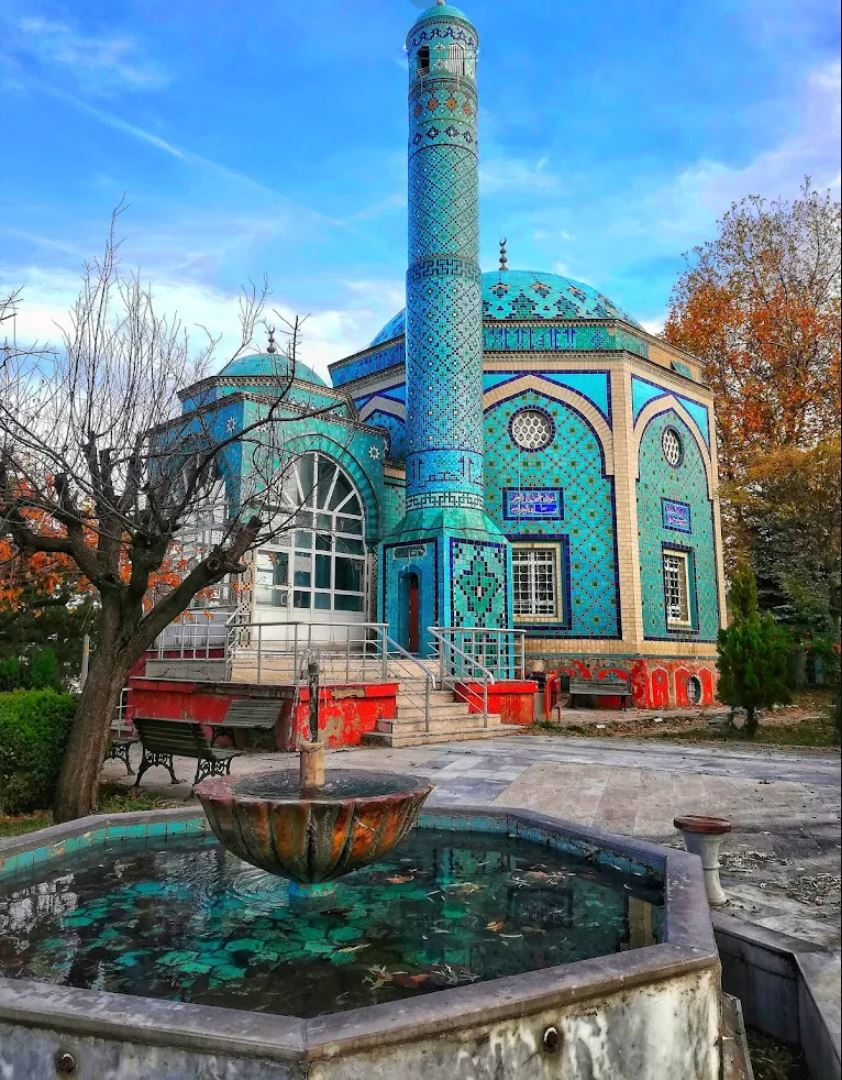
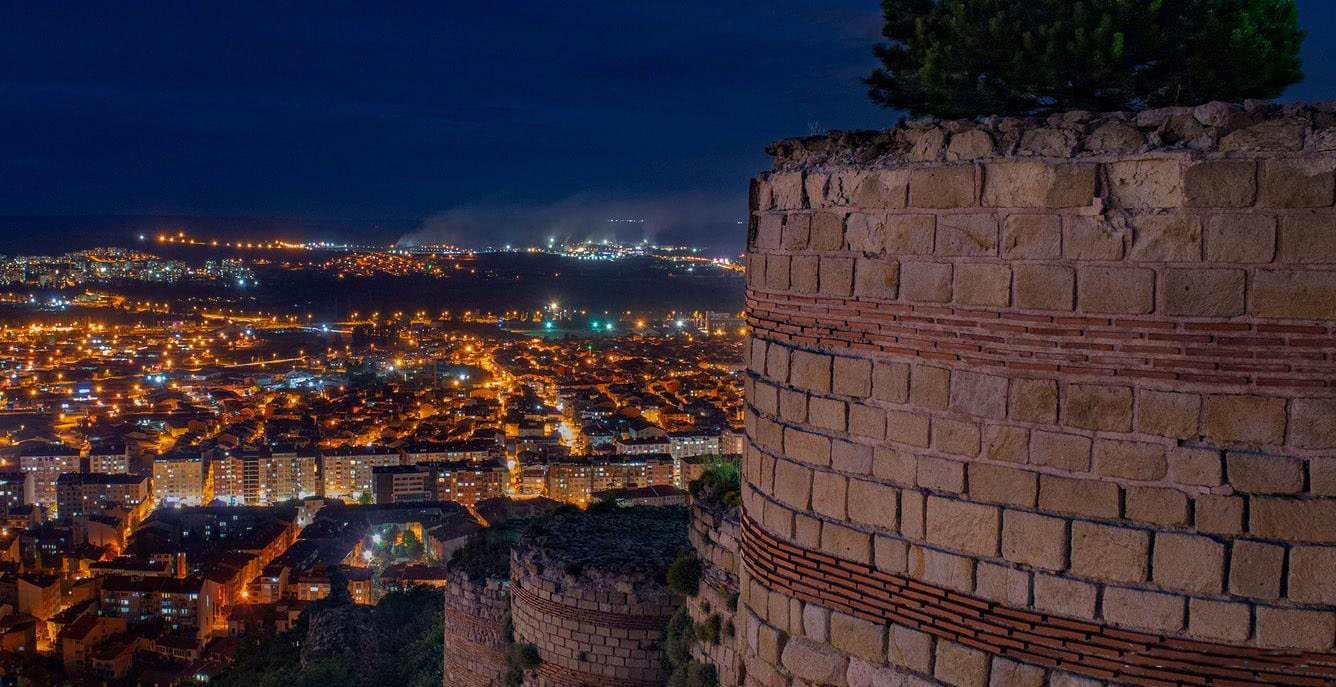
- Top to bottom, left to right: Kütahya Grand Mosque, Historical Government House, Enne Dam Nature Park, Evliya Çelebi Museum, clock tower, Kütahya vase, Germiyan mansions, tiled mosque and park, Kütahya Castle

- Logo

- Location of Kütahya in Turkey and Europe Kütahya (Turkey Aegean)
- Coordinates: 39°25′N 29°59′E
- Country: Turkey
- Province: Kütahya
- District: Kütahya

Government
  - Mayor: Eyüp Kahveci (CHP)
- Elevation: 970 m (3,180 ft)
- Population (2022): 263,863
- Time zone: UTC+3 (TRT)
- Postal code: 43000
- Area code: 0274
- Website: www.kutahya.bel.tr

Kütahya (Turkish pronunciation: [cyˈtahja]) is a city in western Turkey which lies on the Porsuk River, at 969 metres above sea level. It is the seat of Kütahya Province and Kütahya District. Its population is 263,863 (2022). The region of Kütahya has large areas of gentle slopes with agricultural land culminating in high mountain ridges to the north and west.

== History ==
=== Bronze Age ===
Although the exact date of its establishment cannot be determined, its history dates back to 3000 BC. According to old sources, the ancient names of Kütahya were Kotiaeon, Cotiaeum and Koti.

=== Iron Age ===
In the Iron Age the province was settled by the Phrygians. The Phrygians, who came to Anatolia in 1200 BC, entered the lands of the Hittite Empire and organized as a state. In 676 BC, the Cimmerians defeated the Phrygian King Midas III and dominated the area and its surroundings. During the time when Alyattes was the King of Lydia, the Cimmerian rule was replaced by the Lydian rule.

=== Classical Age ===
In 334 BC, Alexander the Great, who defeated the Persians near the Biga River, established dominance in the region. With the death of Alexander in 323 BC, the region passed to Antigonos I. In 133 BC, Cotyaion/Kotyaion (Greek: Κοτύαιον) came under Roman rule and was called Cotyaeum. Cotyaeum became part of the Roman province of Phrygia Salutaris, but in about 820 became the capital of the new province of Phrygia Salutaris III.

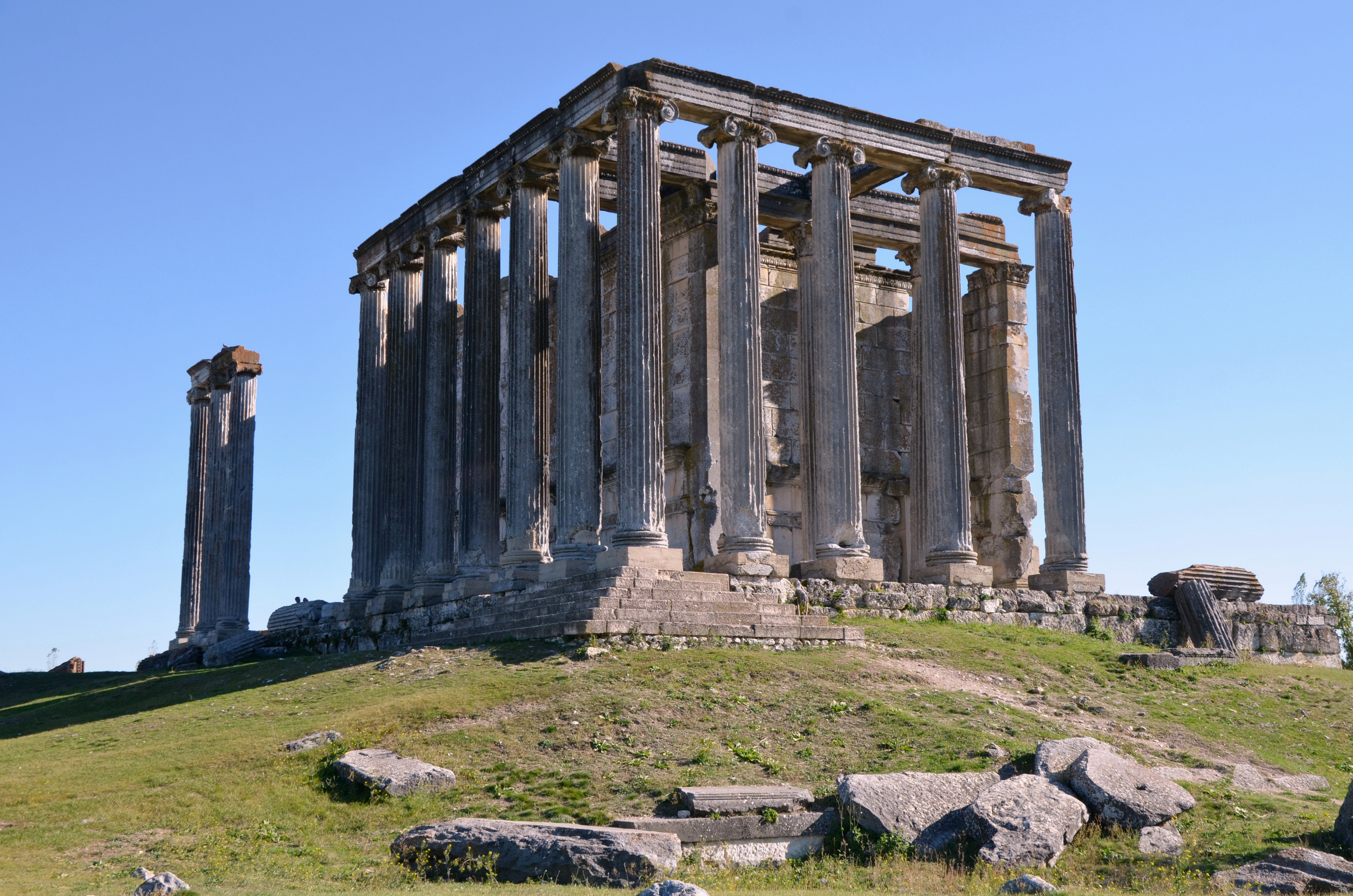
The ancient city of Aizanoi in Kütahya

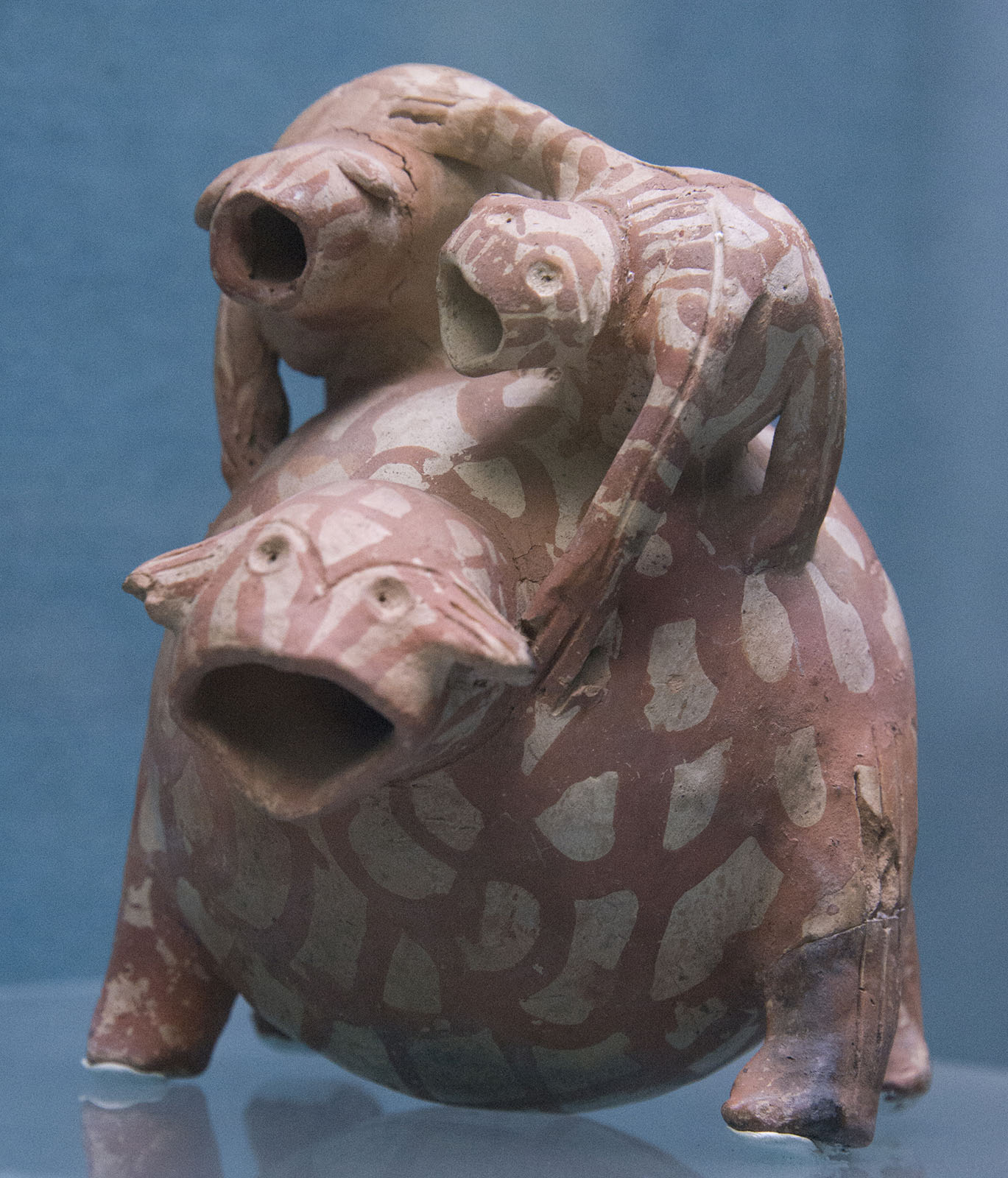
An artifact in Kütahya Archaeological Museum

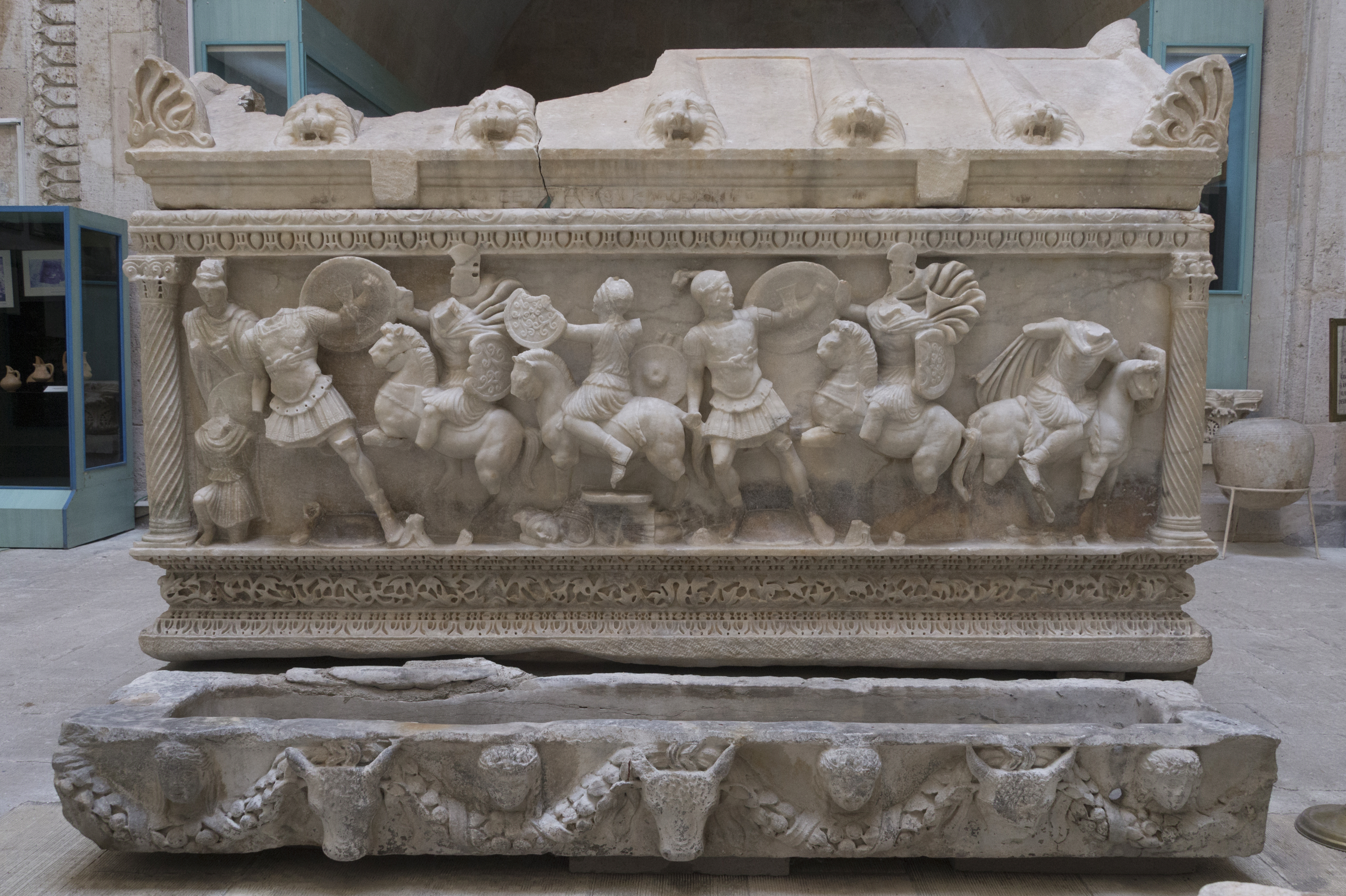
An Amazon sarcophagus in Kütahya Archaeological Museum

=== Byzantine Period ===
==== Church history ====
The most famous event of Christian Church history in Kütahya is the martyrdom of Menas the Great Martyr and Wonderworker. The future saint Menas was born in 285 AD into a Christian family in Niceous, Egypt. He became a professional soldier in the Roman Legion at age 15 and served in Phrygia during the reign of Emperor Diocletian (284–305 AD). In 298, the Roman emperor published an edict ordering everyone to worship and sacrifice the Roman gods and the Legions were ordered to capture and persecute Christians. As a Christian, Menas could not sacrifice to the Roman gods or persecute his fellow Christians, so he threw down his soldiers belt (a symbol of rank) and left the military after three years of service. Menas went to a deserted mountain as a hermit to devote his whole life to Christ. In 304 AD after five years of desert solitude, Menas came to Cotyaeum during a feast to Roman god and declared that he was Christian before Pyrrhus, the Prefect of Phrygia. The Prefect imprisoned Menas and ordered his torture and beheading on a rock outside the city that is still remembered in Kütahya today.

After becoming the capital of Phrygia Salutaris, the bishopric of Cotyaeum changed from being a suffragan of Synnada to a metropolitan see, although with only three suffragan sees according to the Notitia Episcopatuum of Byzantine Emperor Leo VI the Wise (886–912), which is dated to around 901–902. According to the 6th-century historian John Malalas, Cyrus of Panopolis, who had been prefect of the city of Constantinople, was sent there as bishop by Emperor Theodosius II (408–50), after four bishops of the city had been killed. (Two other sources make Cyrus bishop of Smyrna instead.) The bishopric of Cotyaeum was headed in 431 by Domnius, who attended the Council of Ephesus, and in 451 by Marcianus, who was at the Council of Chalcedon. A source cited by Le Quien says that a bishop of Kotyaion named Eusebius was at the Second Council of Constantinople in 553. Cosmas was at the Third Council of Constantinople in 680–681. Ioannes, a deacon, represented an unnamed bishop of Kotyaion at the Trullan Council in 692. Bishop Constantinus was at the Second Council of Nicaea in 692, and Bishop Anthimus at the Photian Council of Constantinople (879),

After the city had fallen to the Germiyanids, in 1370 the metropolitanate of Kotyaion assumed the churches of Hierapolis, Chonae and Synnada, while in 1384 Kotyaion was assumed by the metropolitanate of Laodicea and in 1386 by the metropolitanate of Prousa. No longer a residential bishopric, Kotyaion is today listed by the Catholic Church as a titular see.

==== Justinian's fortifications ====
Under the reign of Byzantine Emperor Justinian I the town was fortified with a double-line of walls and citadel.

==== Fall to the Seljuks, Germiyanids, Timurids and Ottomans ====
In 1071 Kotyaion briefly fell to the Seljuks, but was later recaptured by the Byzantines. The city was sacked by the Seljuks sometime after 1180, following the death of emperor Manuel I Komnenos. It was captured by the Germiyanids and later by Timur-Leng, until it was conquered by the Ottomans in 1428.

=== Ottoman Period ===
It was initially the center of Anatolia Eyalet until 1827, when the Hüdavendigâr Eyalet was formed. It was later center of the sancak within the borders of the Hüdavendigâr Vilayet in 1867. Troops of Ibrahim Pasha of Egypt briefly occupied it in 1833.

==== Armenian ceramics ====
During this time a large number of Christian Armenians settled in Kotyaion/Kütahya, where they came to dominate the tile-making and ceramic-ware production. Kütahya emerged as a renowned center for the Ottoman ceramic industry, producing tiles and faience for mosques, churches, and official buildings in places all over the Middle East. The craft industry of Armenian ceramics in Jerusalem was started by Armenian ceramicist David Ohannessian, master of a Kütahya workshop between 1907 and 1915, who was deported from Kütahya in early 1916, during the Armenian genocide, and rediscovered, living as a refugee in Aleppo in 1918, by Sir Mark Sykes, a former patron. Sykes connected him to the new military governor of Jerusalem, Sir Ronald Storrs, and arranged for Ohannessian to travel to Jerusalem to participate in a planned British restoration of the Dome of the Rock.

Today two families originating from Kutahya, the Balian and Karakashian families continue the tradition of Armenian Ceramics in East Jerusalem. The Balian studio is where the late Marie Balian transformed the art of ceramic tile murals.

==== Fortifications ====
The fortifications of the city and its environs, which were vital to the security and economic prosperity of the region, were built and rebuilt from antiquity through the Ottoman period. However, the dates assigned to the many periods of construction and the assessment of the military architecture are open to various interpretations.

==== Late 19th- and early 20th-century history ====
At the end of the nineteenth century, the population of the kaza of Kütahya numbered 120,333, of which 4,050 were Greeks, 2,533 Armenians, 754 Catholics, and the remainder Turks and other Muslim ethnicities. Kütahya and the district itself were spared the ravages of the Armenian genocide of 1915, when the Ottoman governor, Faruk Ali Bey, went to extreme lengths to protect the Armenian population from being uprooted and sent away on death marches. However, Faruk Ali Bey was removed from office in March 1916, and the city's Armenian community suffered in the aftermath under the rule of his successor, Ahmet Mufti Bey. Kütahya was occupied by the Greek Army on 17 July 1921 after Battle of Kütahya–Eskişehir during the Turkish War of Independence and was then captured in ruins by the Turkish Army after the Battle of Dumlupınar during the Great Offensive on 30 August 1922.

== Economy ==
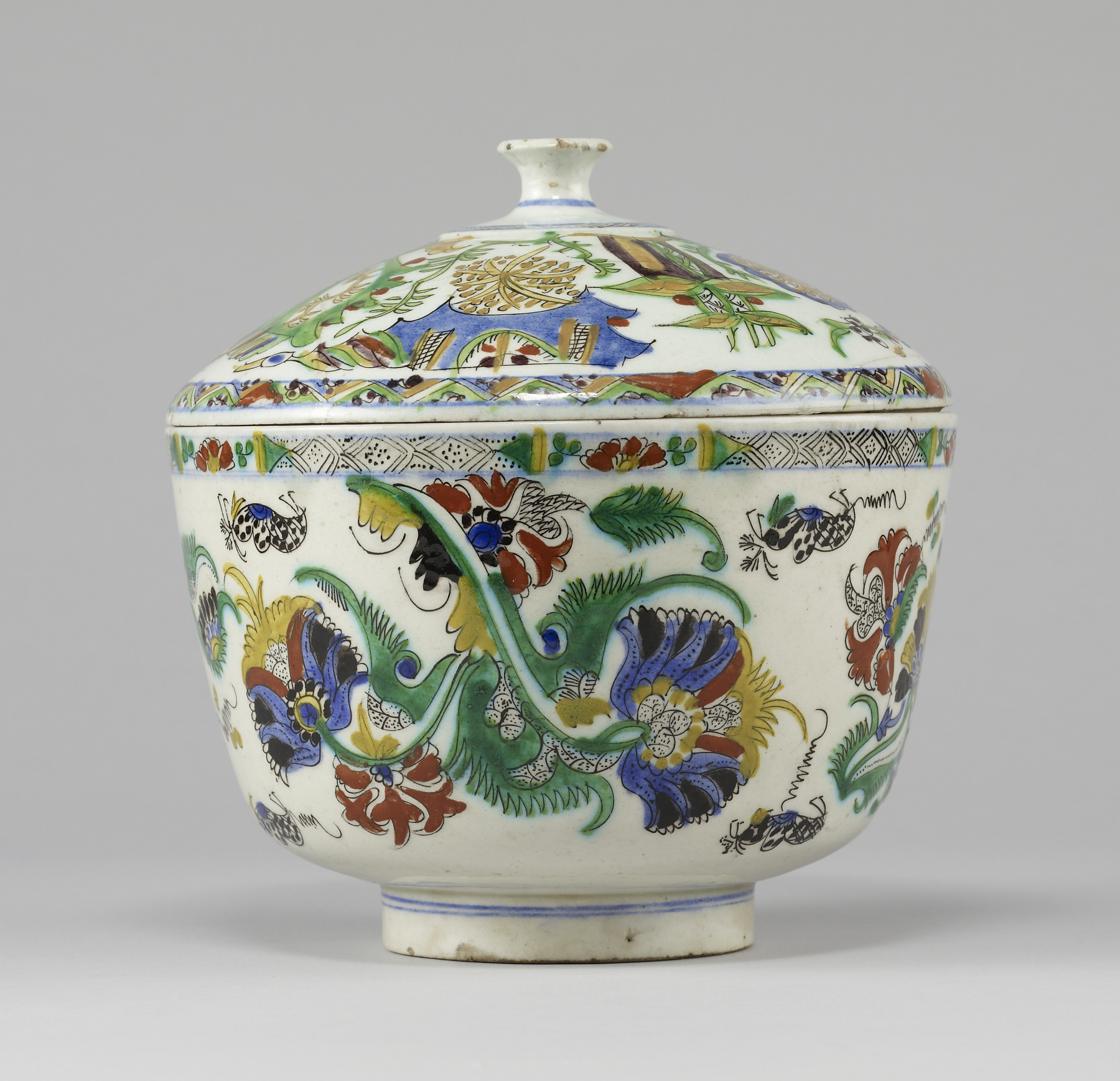
Kütahya ceramics, covered bowl, second half of the 18th century

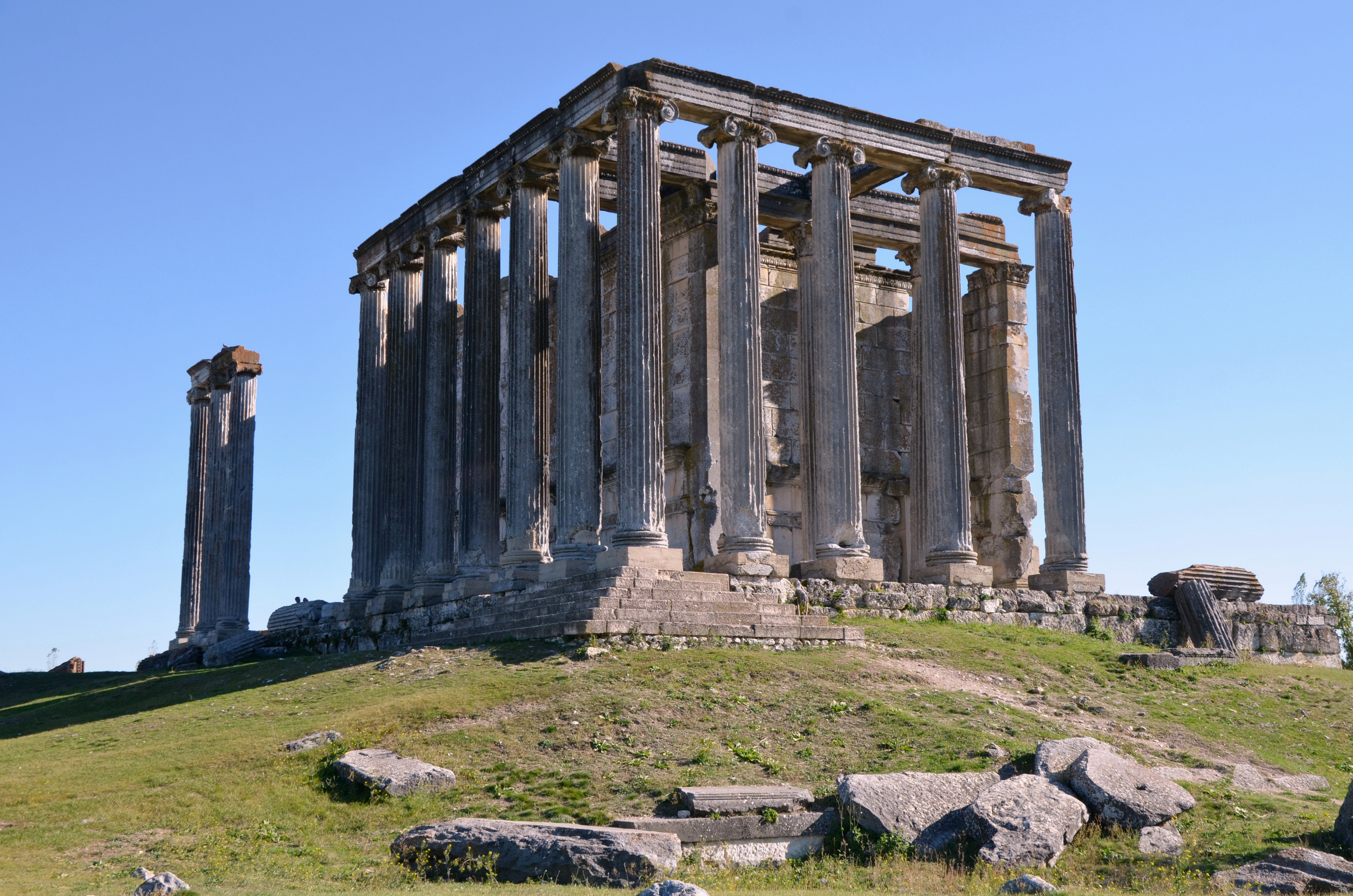
Temple of Zeus in ancient city of Aizanoi. Tourism is economically important to the city.

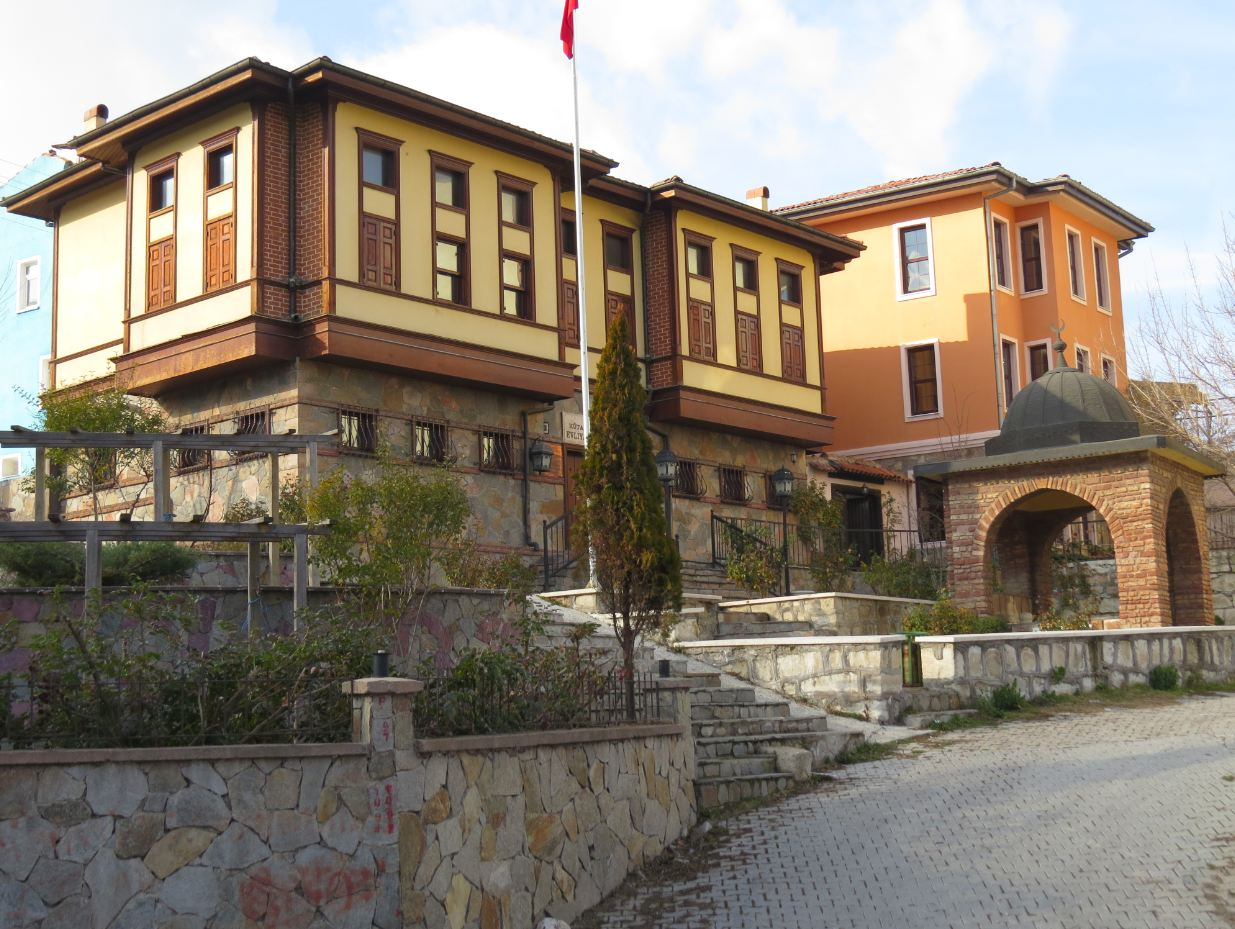
House of Evliya Çelebi

The industries of Kütahya have long traditions, going back to ancient times.

Kütahya is famous for its kiln products, such as tiles and pottery, which are glazed and multicoloured. Modern industries are sugar refining, tanning, nitrate processing and different products of meerschaum, which is extracted nearby.

In the Ottoman period, Kütahya was a major cotton production center of the empire. Modern local agricultural industry produces cereals, fruits and sugar beet. In addition stock raising is of much importance. Not far from Kütahya there are important mines extracting lignite.

Kütahya is linked by rail and road with Balıkesir 250 km (155 mi) to the west, İstanbul 360km to the northwest, Konya 450 km (280 mi) to the southeast, Eskişehir 70 km (43 mi) northeast and Ankara 300 km (186 mi) east.

=== Traditional ceramics ===
A small ewer, now in the British Museum, gave its name to a category of similar blue and white fritware pottery known as 'Abraham of Kütahya ware'. It has an inscription in Armenian script under the glaze on its base stating that it commemorated Abraham of Kütahya with a date of 1510. In 1957 Arthur Lane published an influential article in which he reviewed the history of pottery production in the region and proposed that 'Abraham of Kütahya' ware was produced from 1490 until around 1525, 'Damascus' and 'Golden Horn' ware were produced from 1525 until 1555 and 'Rhodian' ware from around 1555 until the demise of the İznik pottery industry at the beginning of the 18th century. This chronology has been generally accepted.

== Climate ==
Kütahya has a warm-summer Mediterranean climate (Köppen climate classification: Csb), or a temperate continental climate (Trewartha climate classification: Dc), with chilly, wet, often snowy winters and warm, dry summers. Precipitation occurs mostly during the winter and spring, but can be observed throughout the year.

The highest recorded temperature was 41.4 °C (106.5 °F) on 15 August 2023, while the lowest recorded temperature was −28.1 °C (−18.6 °F) on 29 December 1948.

Climate data for Kütahya (1991–2020, extremes 1929–2023)
Month	Jan	Feb	Mar	Apr	May	Jun	Jul	Aug	Sep	Oct	Nov	Dec	Year
Record high °C (°F)	19.1 (66.4)	24.2 (75.6)	27.0 (80.6)	30.2 (86.4)	34.3 (93.7)	36.2 (97.2)	39.5 (103.1)	41.4 (106.5)	38.4 (101.1)	31.9 (89.4)	26.0 (78.8)	21.7 (71.1)	41.4 (106.5)
Mean daily maximum °C (°F)	5.1 (41.2)	7.7 (45.9)	11.8 (53.2)	16.8 (62.2)	21.9 (71.4)	25.9 (78.6)	29.2 (84.6)	29.4 (84.9)	25.4 (77.7)	19.7 (67.5)	13.2 (55.8)	6.8 (44.2)	17.7 (63.9)
Daily mean °C (°F)	0.6 (33.1)	2.3 (36.1)	5.8 (42.4)	10.2 (50.4)	15.0 (59.0)	18.8 (65.8)	21.6 (70.9)	21.6 (70.9)	17.4 (63.3)	12.4 (54.3)	6.6 (43.9)	2.4 (36.3)	11.2 (52.2)
Mean daily minimum °C (°F)	−2.7 (27.1)	−1.8 (28.8)	0.8 (33.4)	4.4 (39.9)	8.6 (47.5)	12.0 (53.6)	14.5 (58.1)	14.7 (58.5)	10.4 (50.7)	6.7 (44.1)	2.0 (35.6)	−0.7 (30.7)	5.7 (42.3)
Record low °C (°F)	−26.3 (−15.3)	−27.4 (−17.3)	−16.6 (2.1)	−7.8 (18.0)	−2.8 (27.0)	0.5 (32.9)	2.6 (36.7)	−0.2 (31.6)	−3.9 (25.0)	−6.9 (19.6)	−11.0 (12.2)	−28.1 (−18.6)	−28.1 (−18.6)
Average precipitation mm (inches)	64.2 (2.53)	53.3 (2.10)	53.0 (2.09)	52.8 (2.08)	57.5 (2.26)	43.6 (1.72)	19.2 (0.76)	24.6 (0.97)	26.7 (1.05)	43.2 (1.70)	45.3 (1.78)	67.2 (2.65)	550.6 (21.68)
Average precipitation days	13.3	12.23	12.83	11.87	12.03	8.53	3.6	4.47	5.37	8.9	8.83	13.6	115.6
Average snowy days	8.2	5.6	4.1	0.9	0	0	0	0	0	0.1	1.3	4.2	24.4
Average relative humidity (%)	77.7	71.9	65.7	62.8	62.4	61.2	57.3	58.7	61.6	68.2	71.9	78.1	66.5
Mean monthly sunshine hours	68.2	98.9	145.7	189.0	229.4	273.0	319.3	297.6	225.0	161.2	114.0	65.1	2,186.4
Mean daily sunshine hours	2.2	3.5	4.7	6.3	7.4	9.1	10.3	9.6	7.5	5.2	3.8	2.1	6.0
Source 1: Turkish State Meteorological Service
Source 2: NOAA(humidity) Meteomanz(snow days 2003–2023)

== Culture ==
Kütahya's old neighbourhoods are dominated by traditional Ottoman houses made of wood and stucco, some of the best examples being found along Germiyan Caddesi. It has many historical mosques such as Ulu Camii, Cinili Camii, Balikli Camii and Donenler Camii. The Şengül Hamamı is a famous Turkish bathhouse located in the city.

The town preserves some ancient ruins, a Byzantine castle and church. During late centuries Kütahya has been renowned for its Turkish earthenware, of which fine specimens may be seen at the national capital. The Kütahya Museum has a fine collection of arts and cultural artifacts from the area, the house where Hungarian statesman Lajos Kossuth lived in exile between 1850 and 1851 is preserved as a museum.

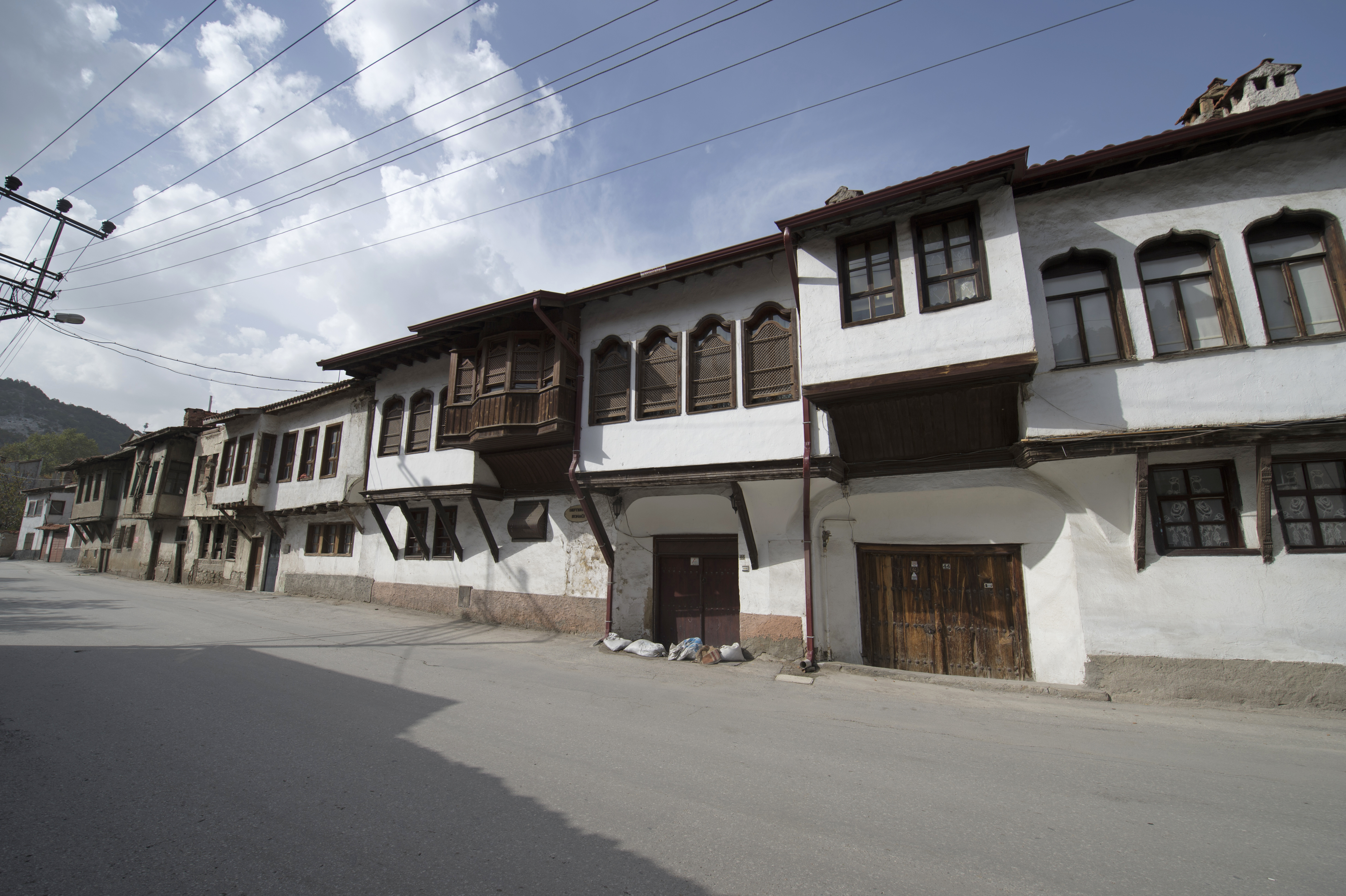
Kütahya Old houses in Sultanbağı region

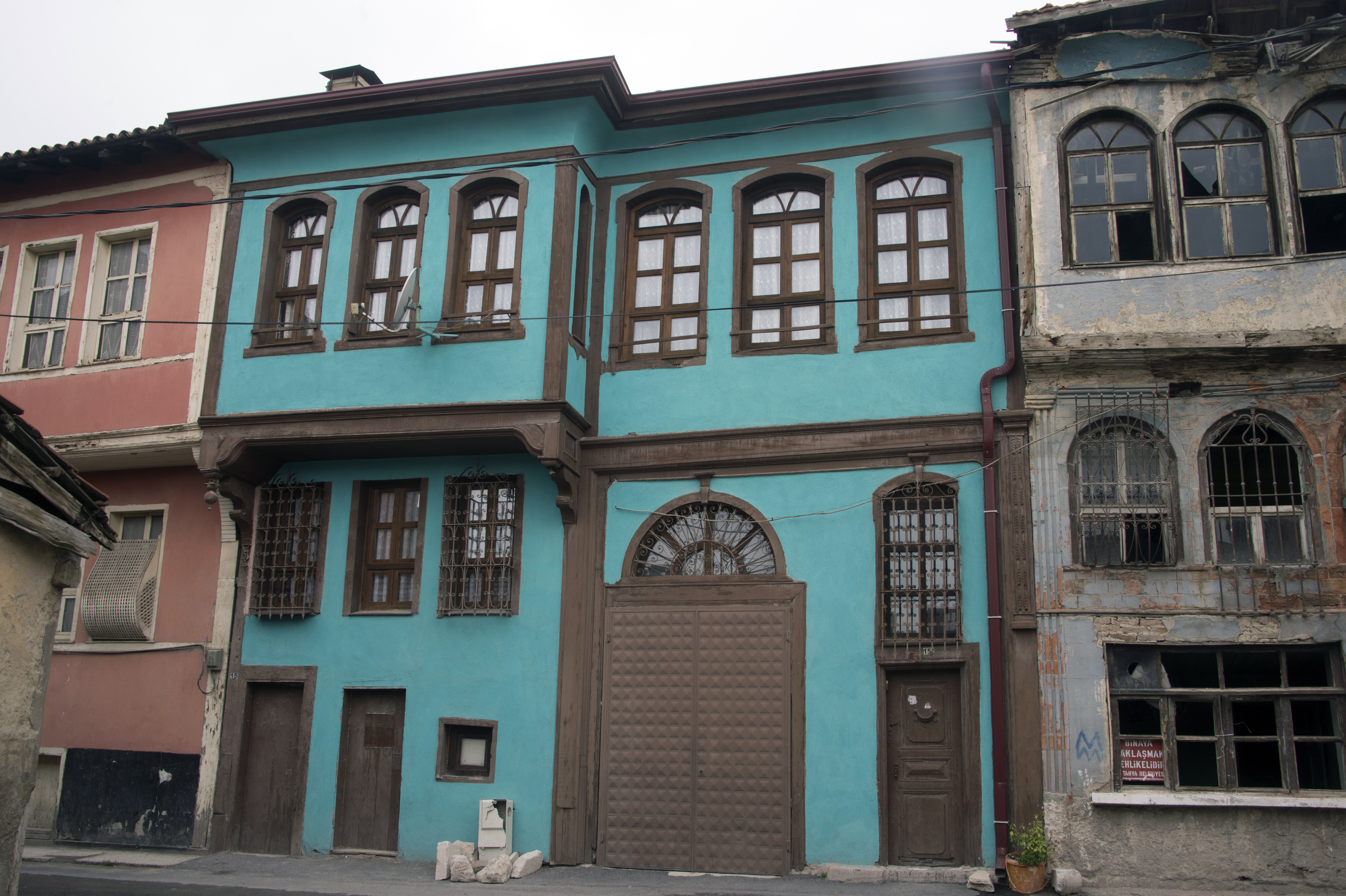
Kütahya Old houses in Sultanbağı region

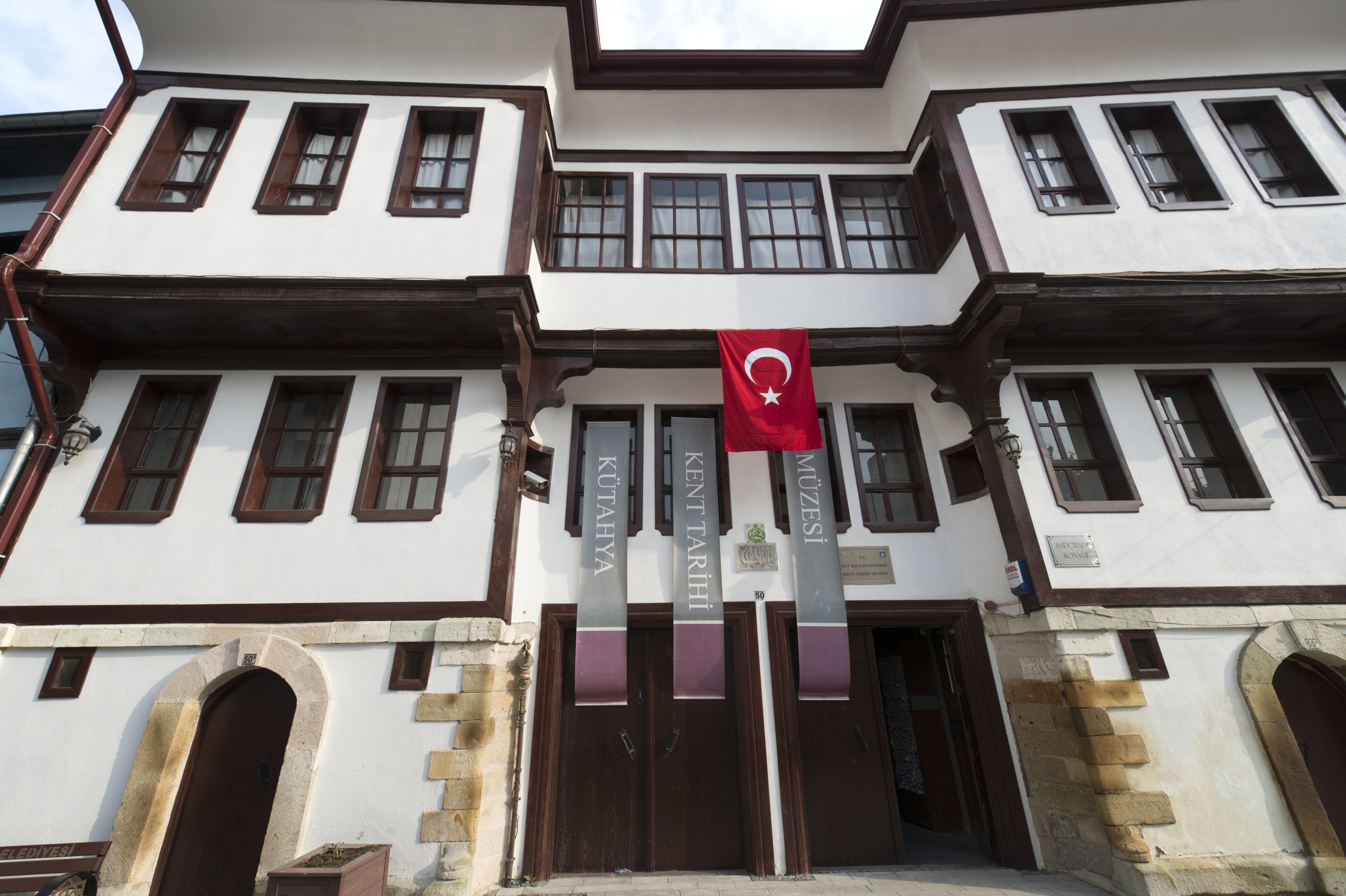
Kütahya City Museum

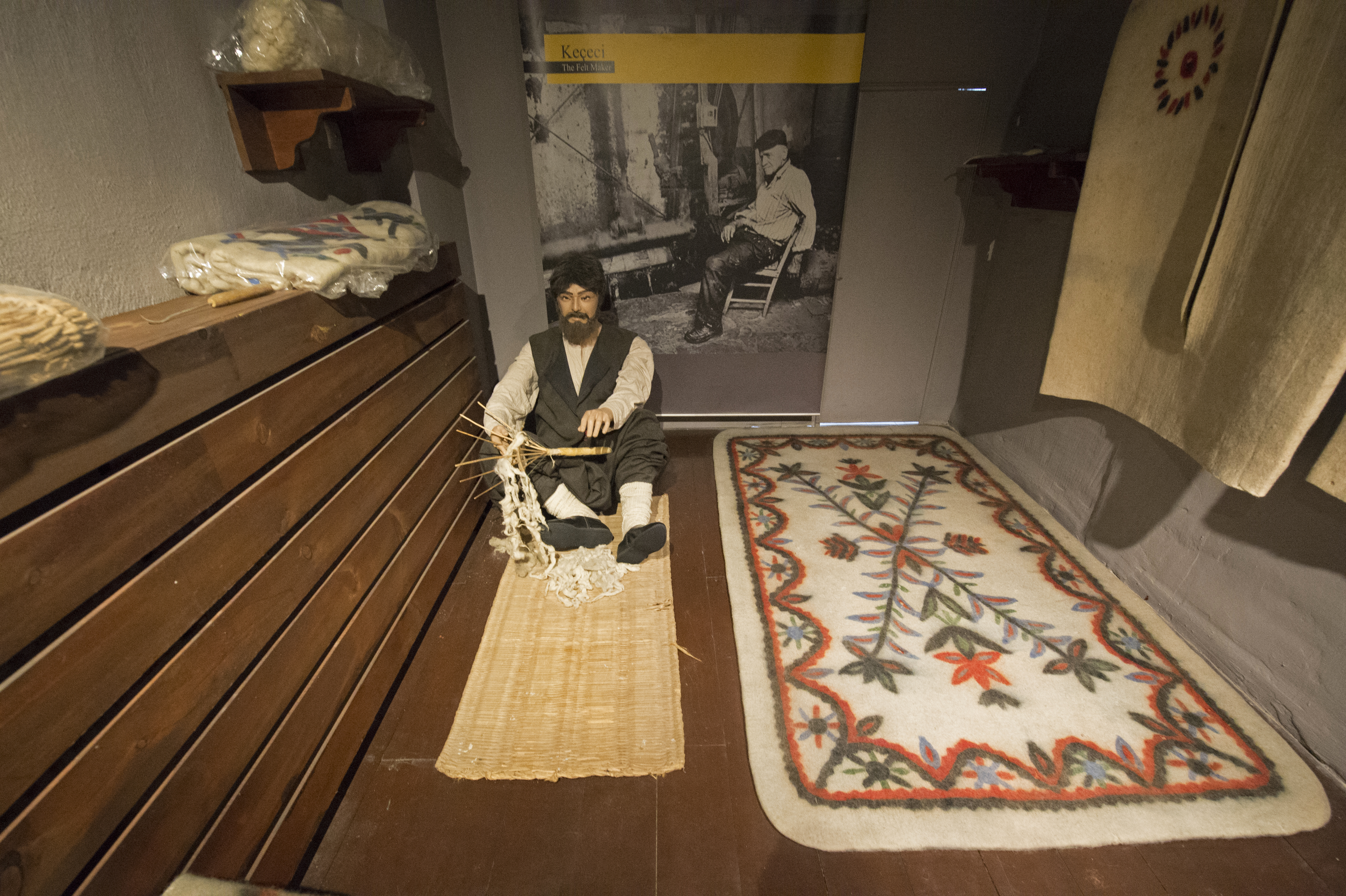
Kütahya City Museum felt maker

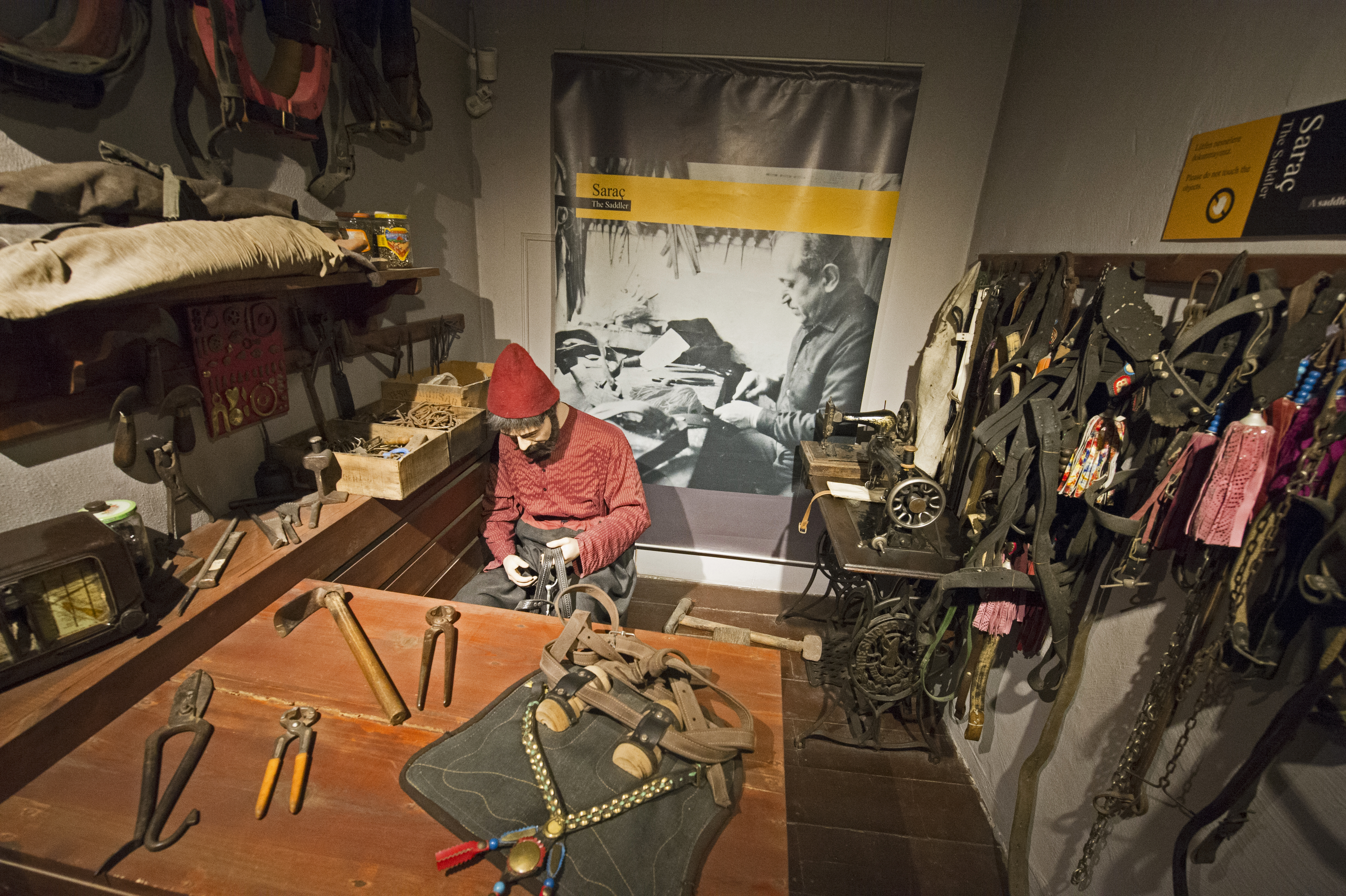
Kütahya City Museum saddle maker

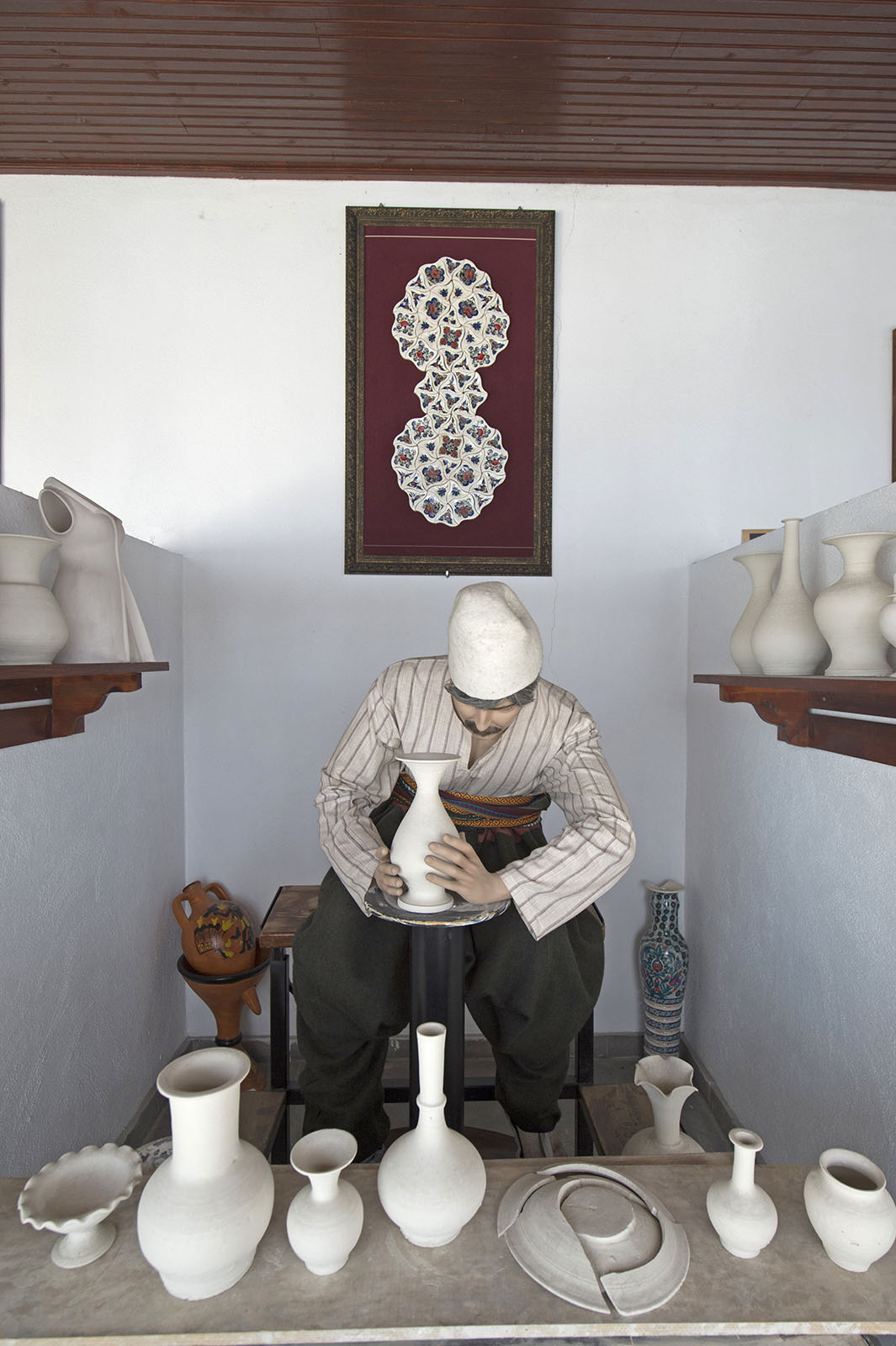
Kütahya City Museum biscuit maker

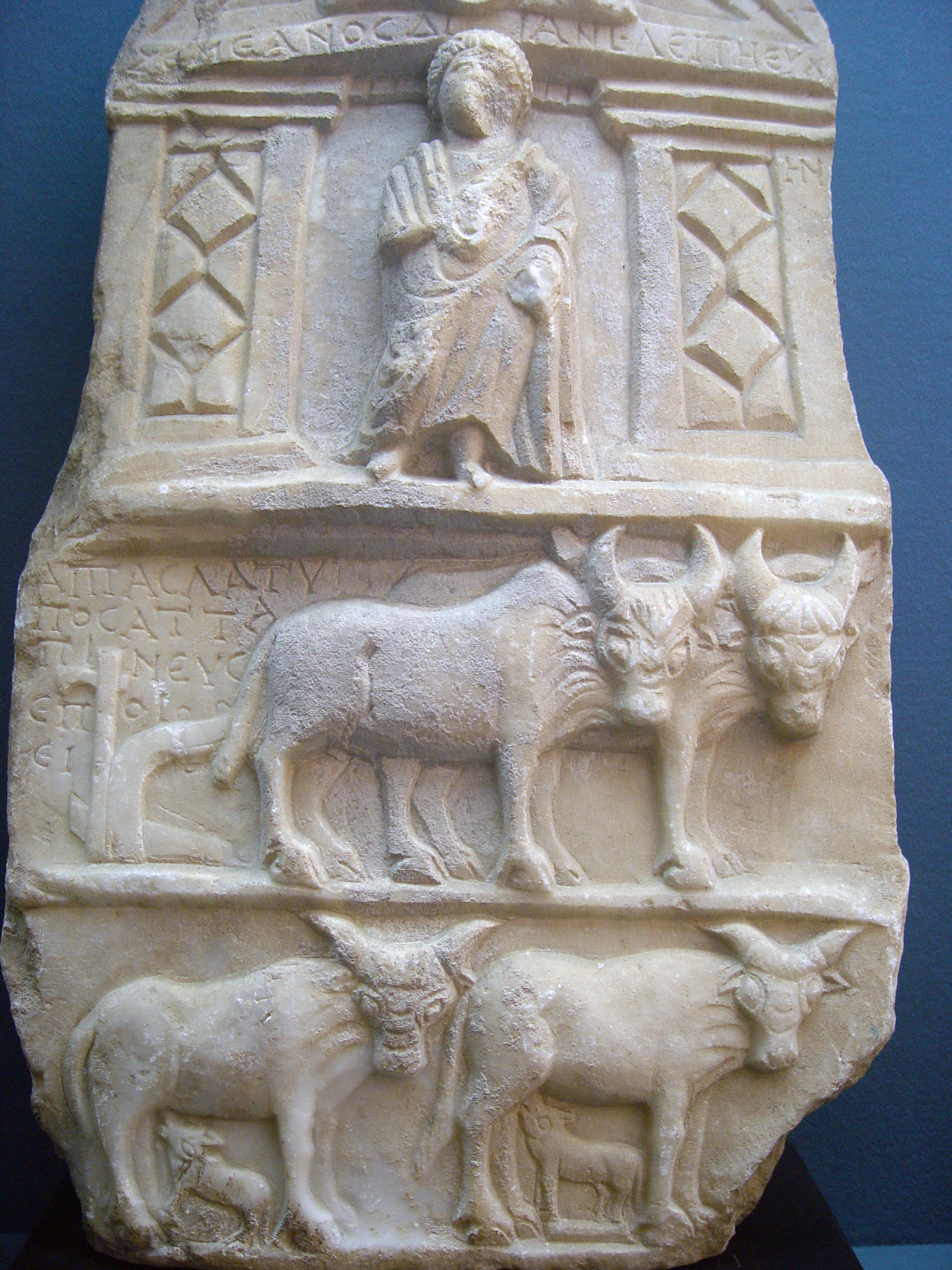
Kütahya archaeological museum stele

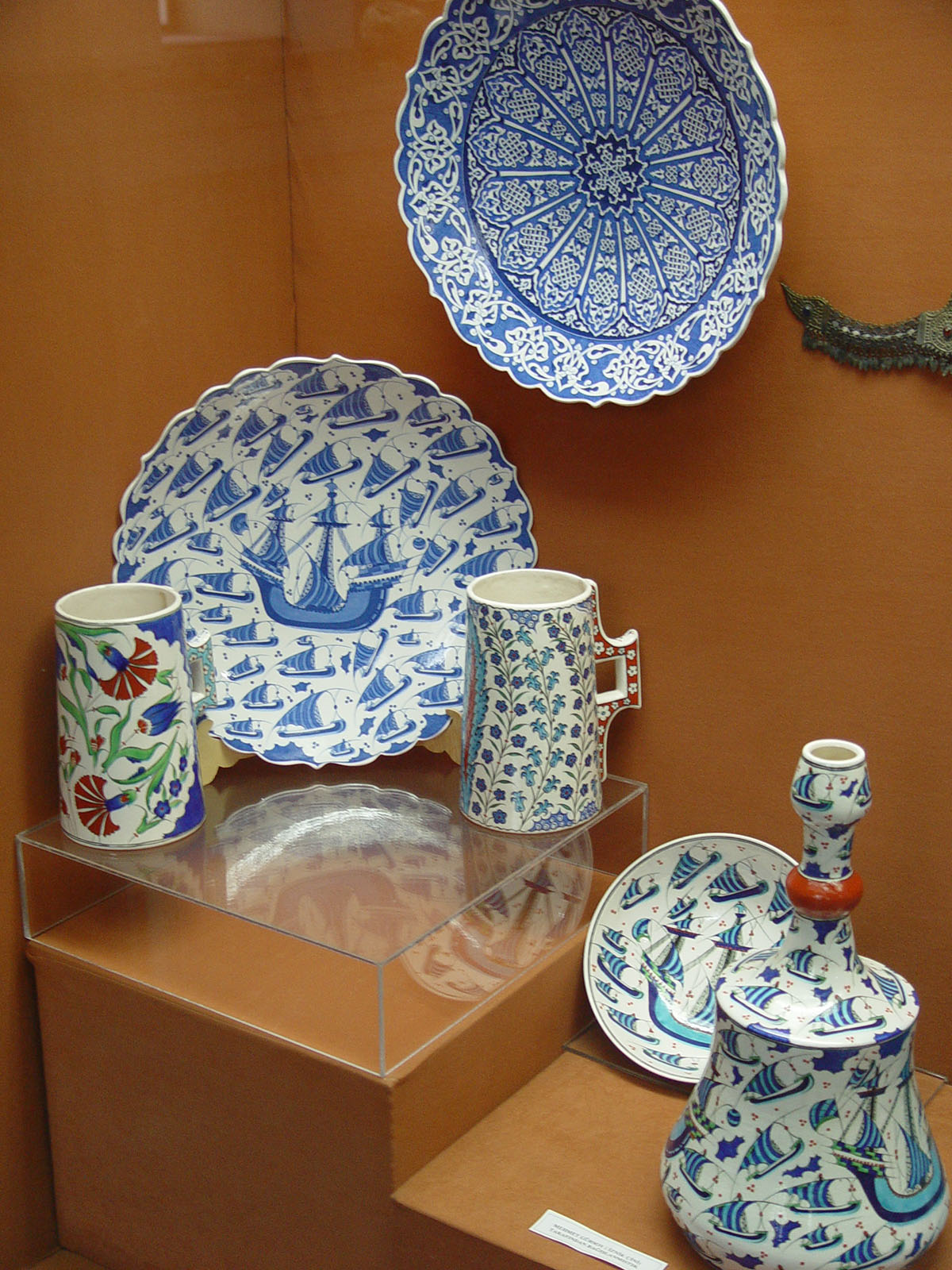
Kutahya Ceramics museum

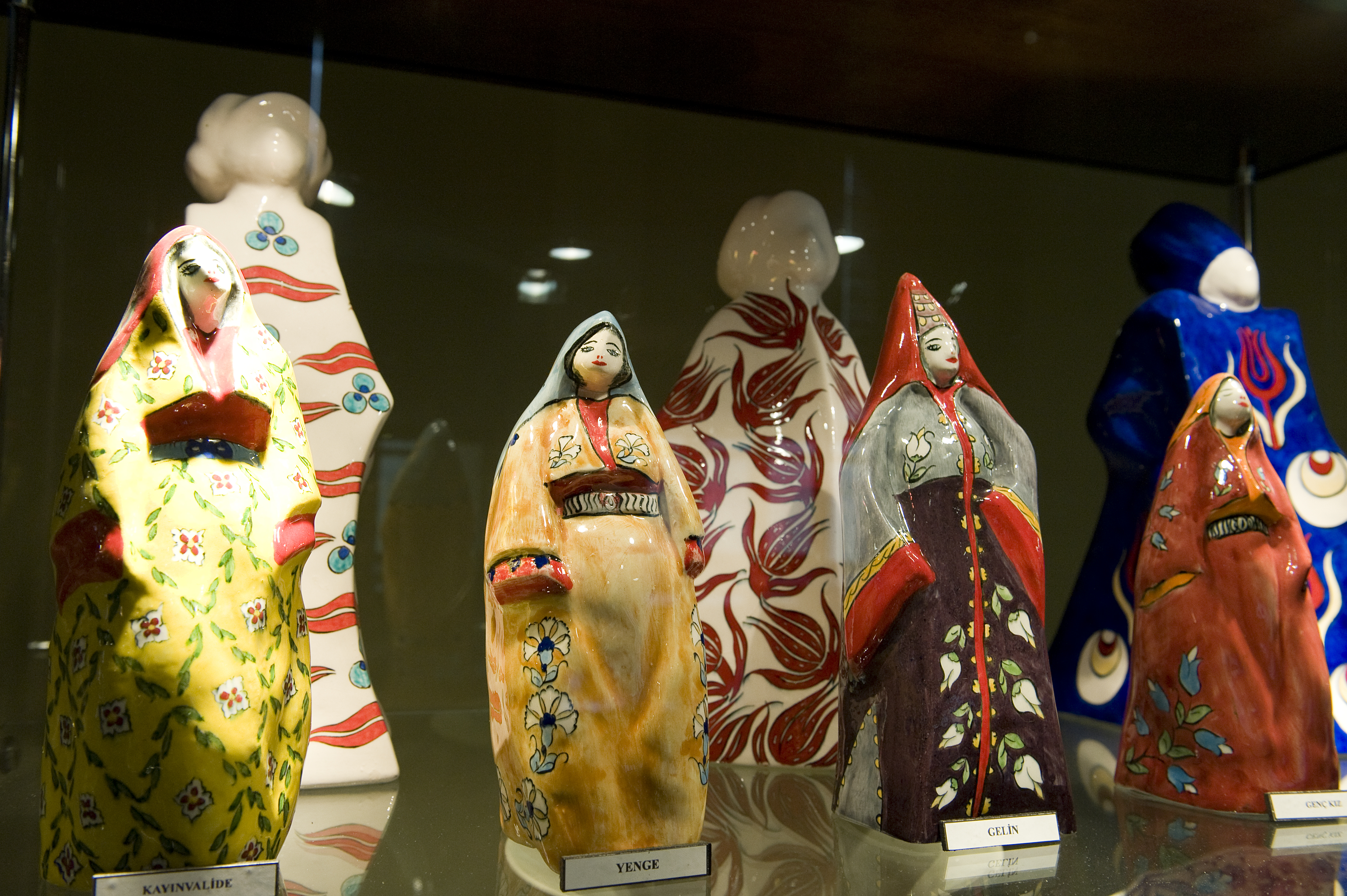
Kutahya Ceramics museum figurines

Kütahya Lajos Kossuth house

Kütahya Lajos Kossuth house

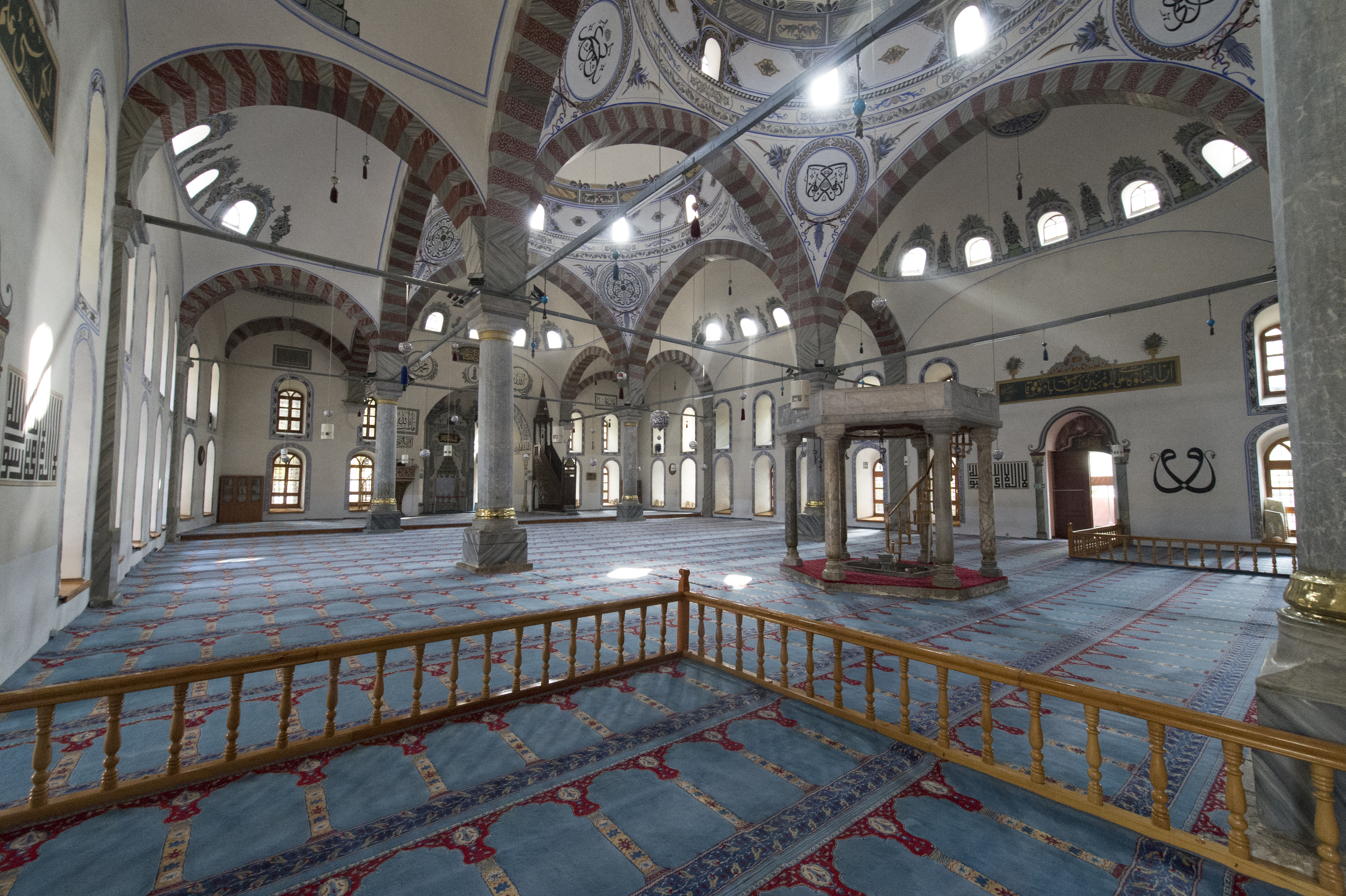
Kütahya Ulu Cami

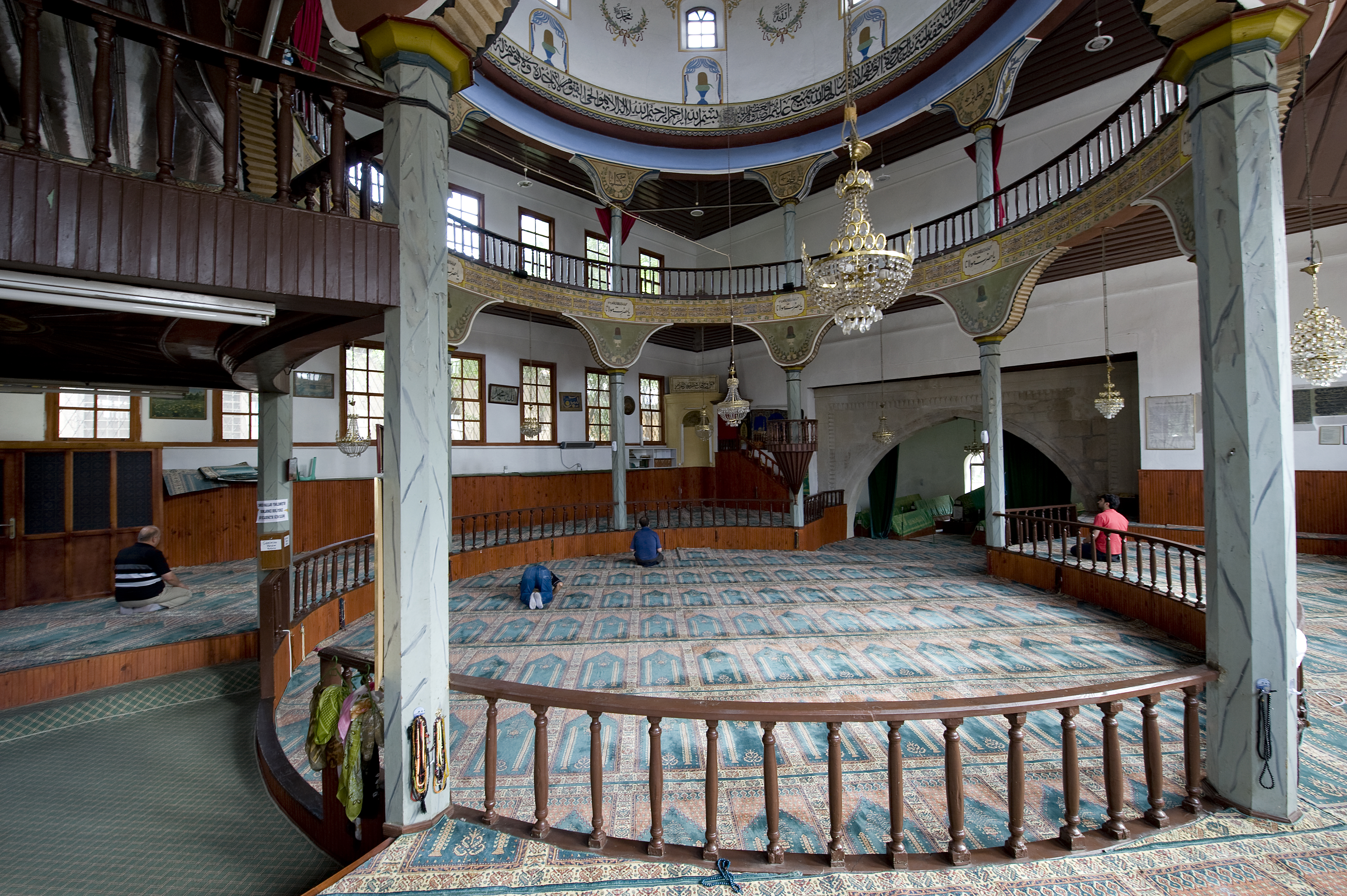
Kutahya Dönenler Mosque

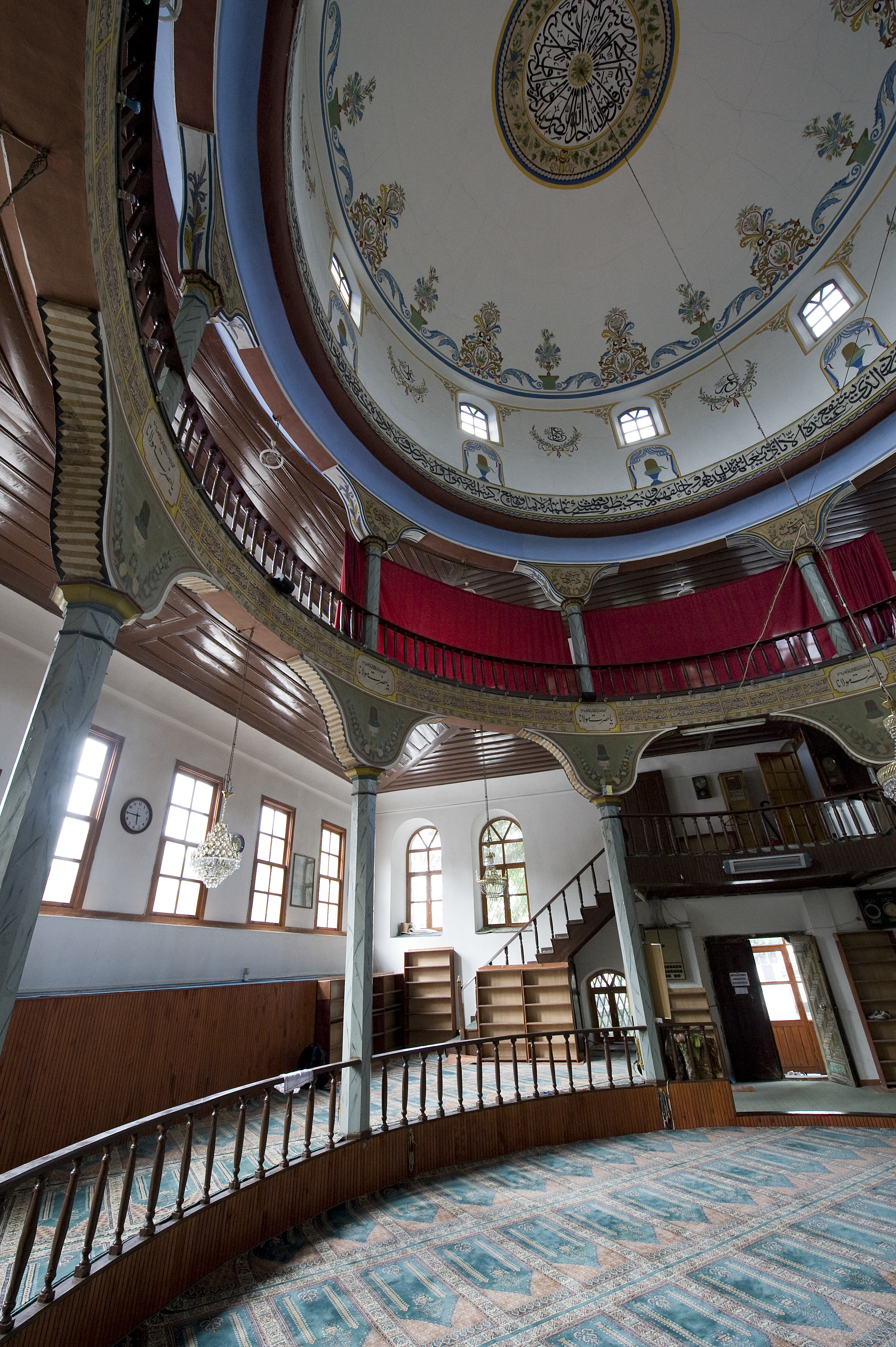
Kütahya Dönenler Mosque

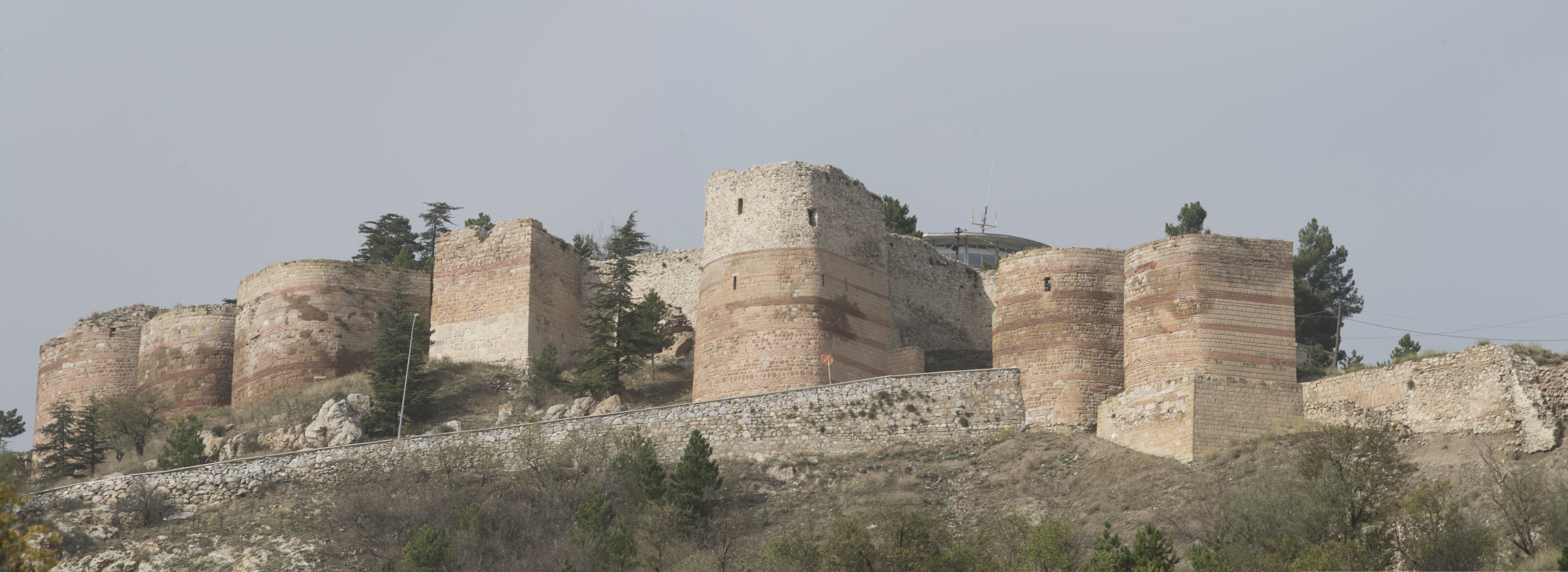
Kütahya Castle Hill

== Education ==
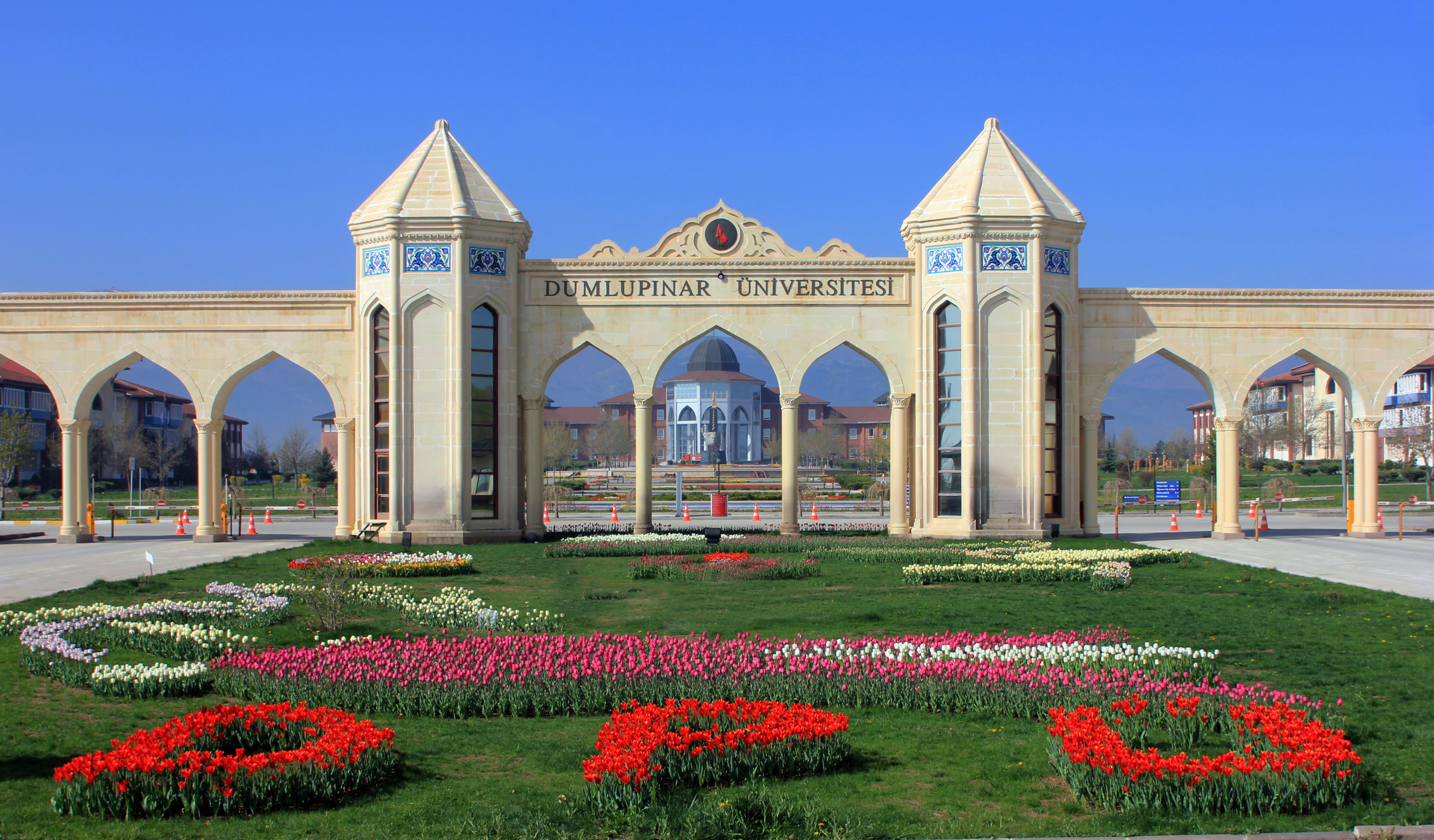
Kütahya Dumlupınar University

The Main Campus and the Germiyan Campus of the Kütahya Dumlupınar University are located in the city.

== Transport ==
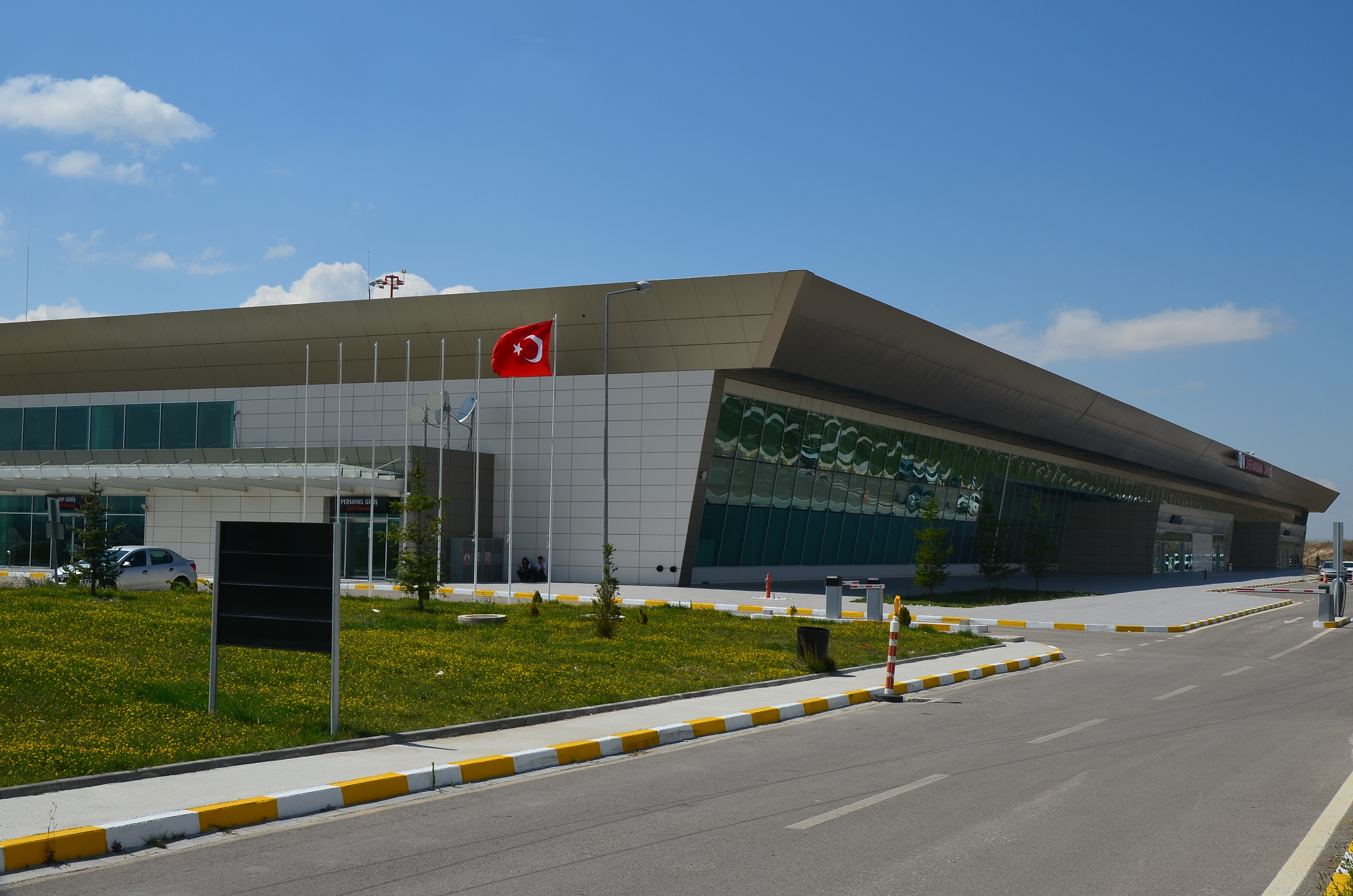
Zafer Airport

The main bus station has bus links to most major Turkish cities. Zafer Airport is active. Kütahya is also the main railroad endpoint for the Aegean region.

== International relations ==
Kütahya is twinned with:

- Bavly, Tatarstan, Russia
- Bikaner, India
- Pécs, Hungary
- Anqing, China
- Danniyeh, Lebanon

== Notable people ==
- Alexander of Cotiaeum (c.70-80CE – c.150CE), Greek grammarian
- Evliya Çelebi (1611–1682), traveler and author.
- Komitas (1869–1935), Armenian composer, musicologist
- Âsım Gündüz (1889–1970), military officer in Ottoman and Turkish armies
- Hisarlı Ahmet (1908–1984), ashik (folk poet-singer)
- Mustafa Kalemli (born 1943), politician
- Ayla Dikmen (1944–1990), singer
- Abdullah Aymaz (born 1949), writer, journalist
- Aydilge Sarp (born 1979), singer
- Halil Akkaş (born 1983), middle-distance runner
- Özge Kırdar (born 1985), volleyball player
- Veli Kızılkaya (born 1985), football player
- Danla Bilic (born 1994), internet personality
- Hande Baladın (born 1997), volleyball player

== See also ==
- Aizanoi, nearby ancient city
- Anatolian Tigers
- Evliya Çelebi Way
- Iznik pottery, ceramics style known from Iznik and Kütahya
- Kumari (Kutahya)

== Gallery ==
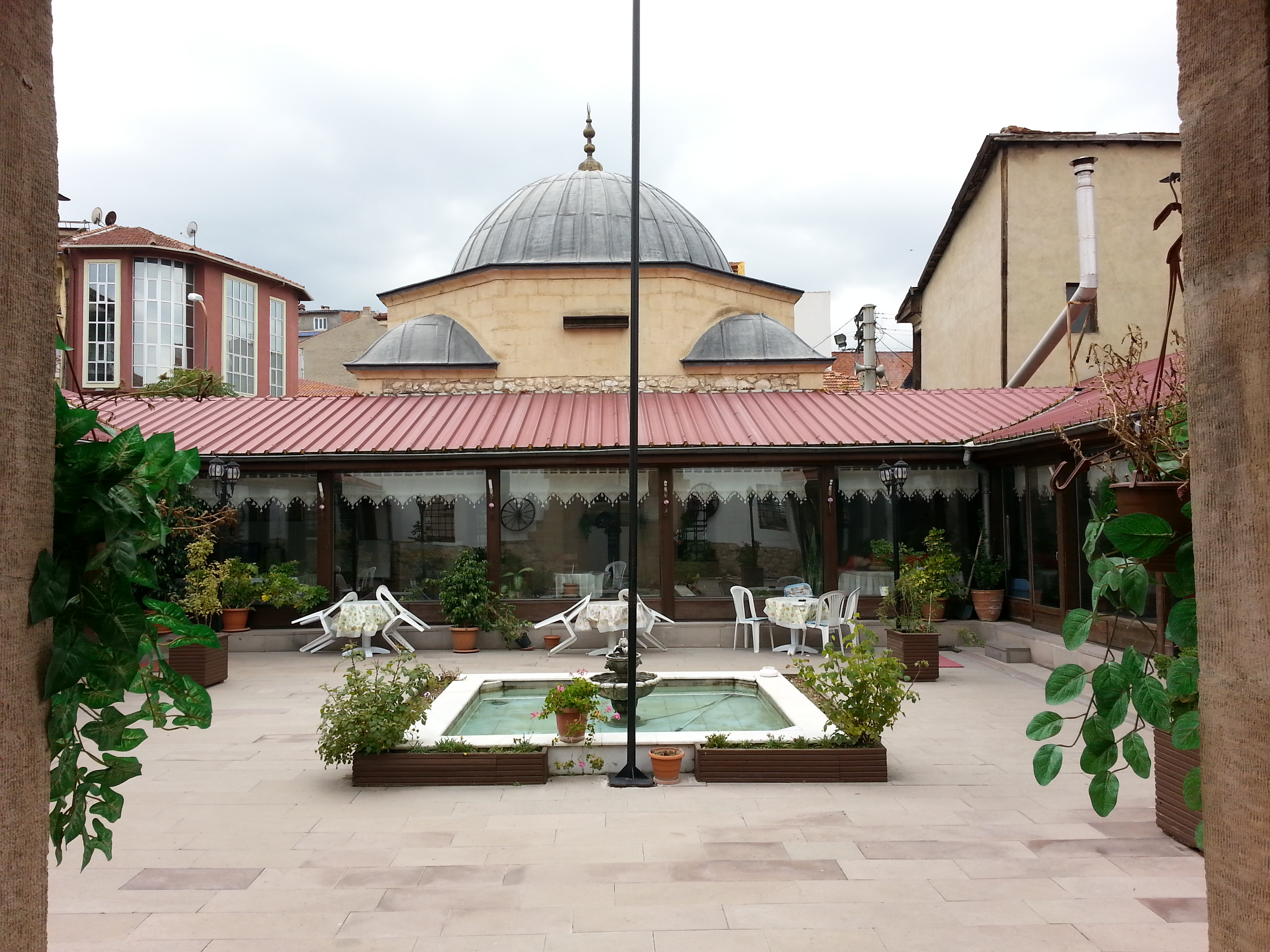
Rüstem Pasha Madrasa

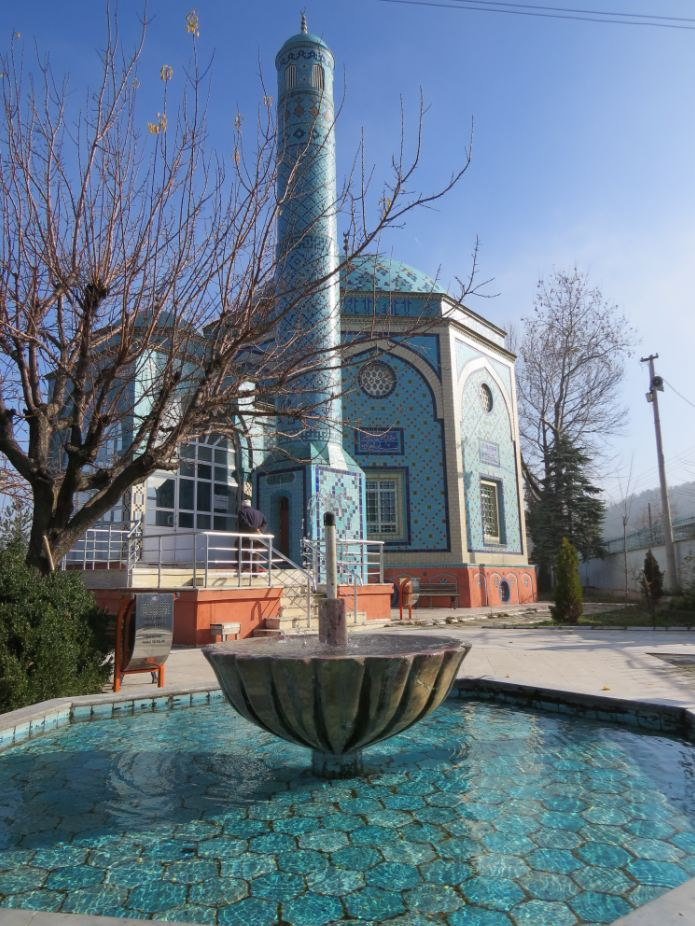
Tiled Mosque

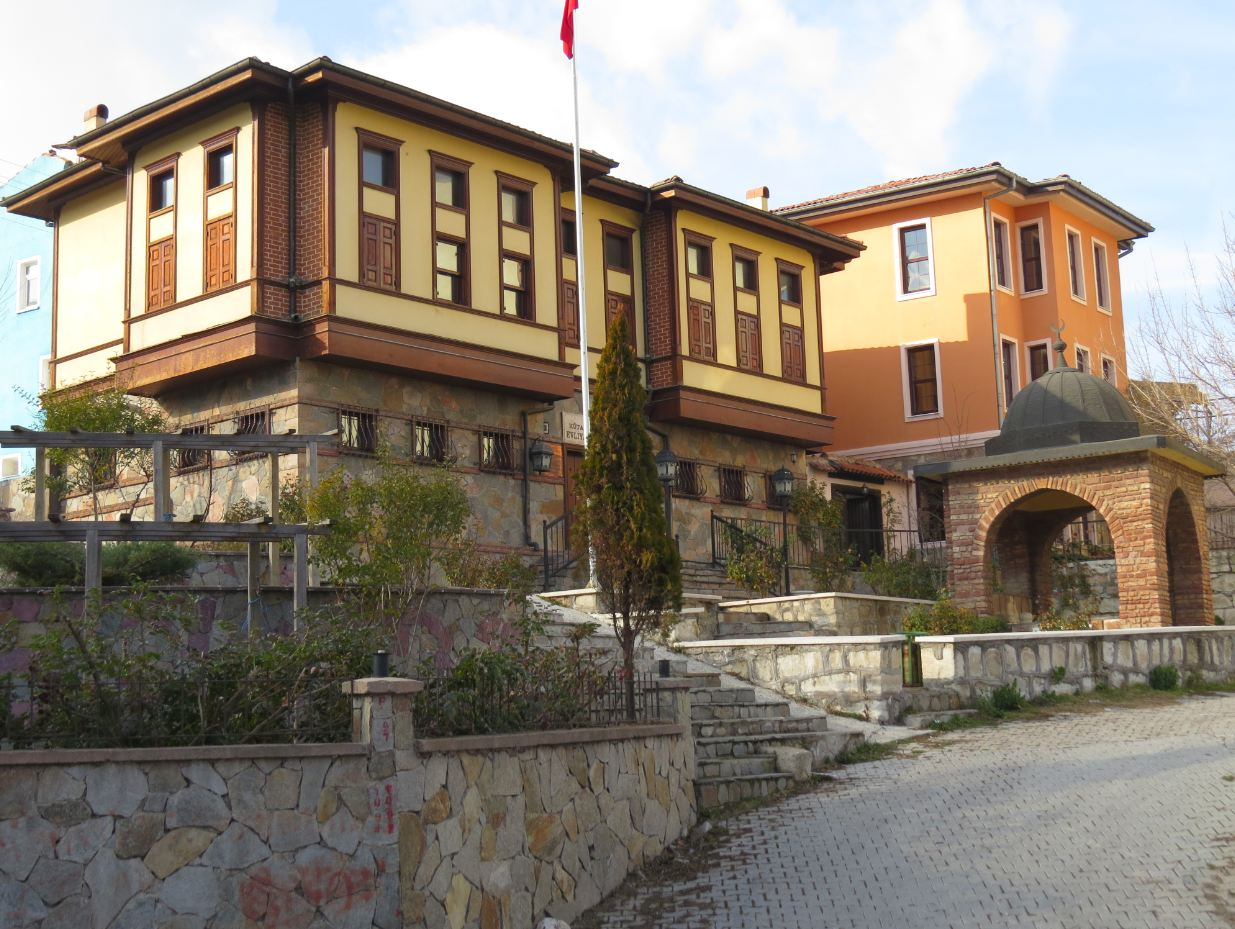
Evliya Çelebi Museum

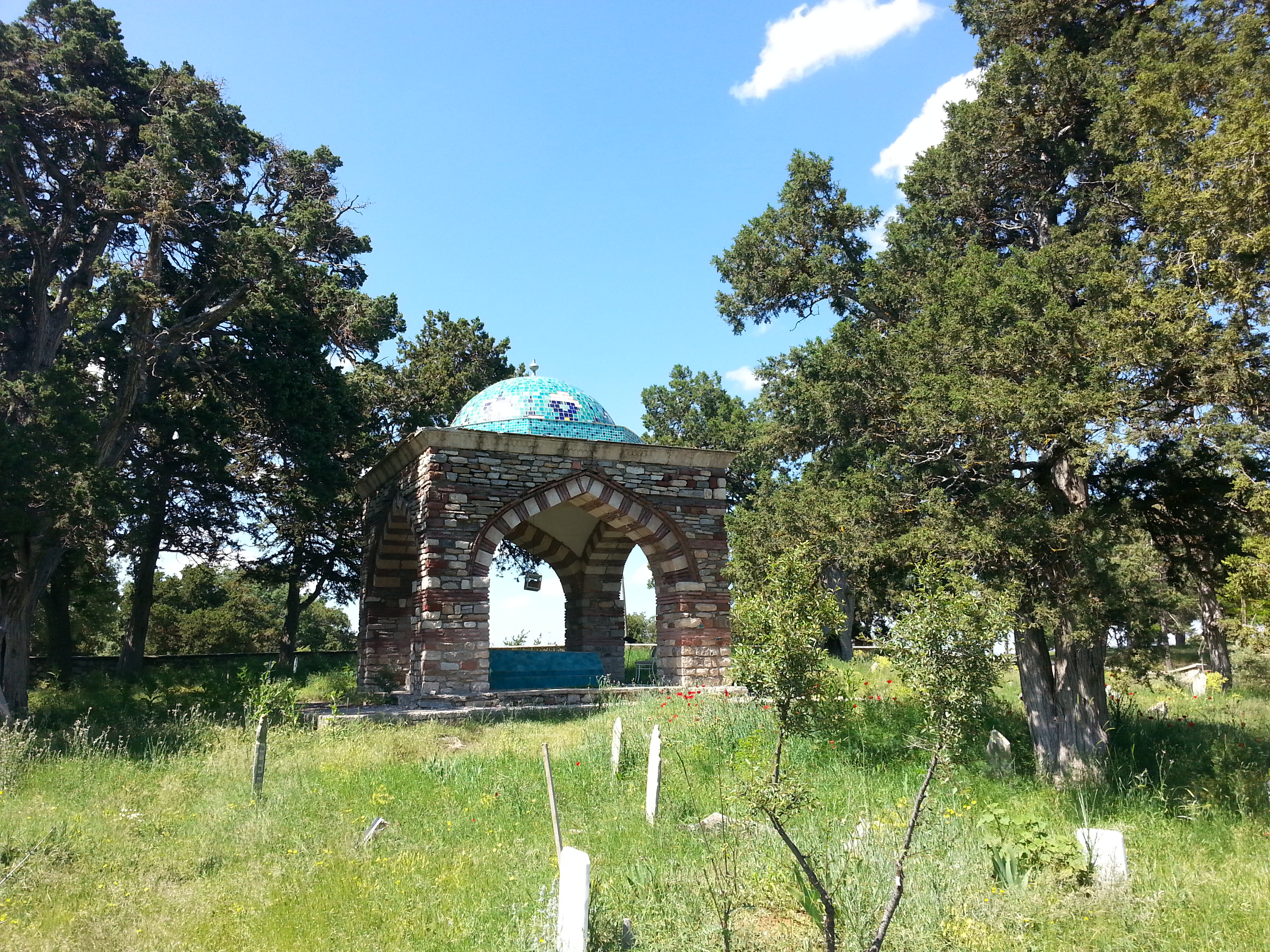
Mother Sultan

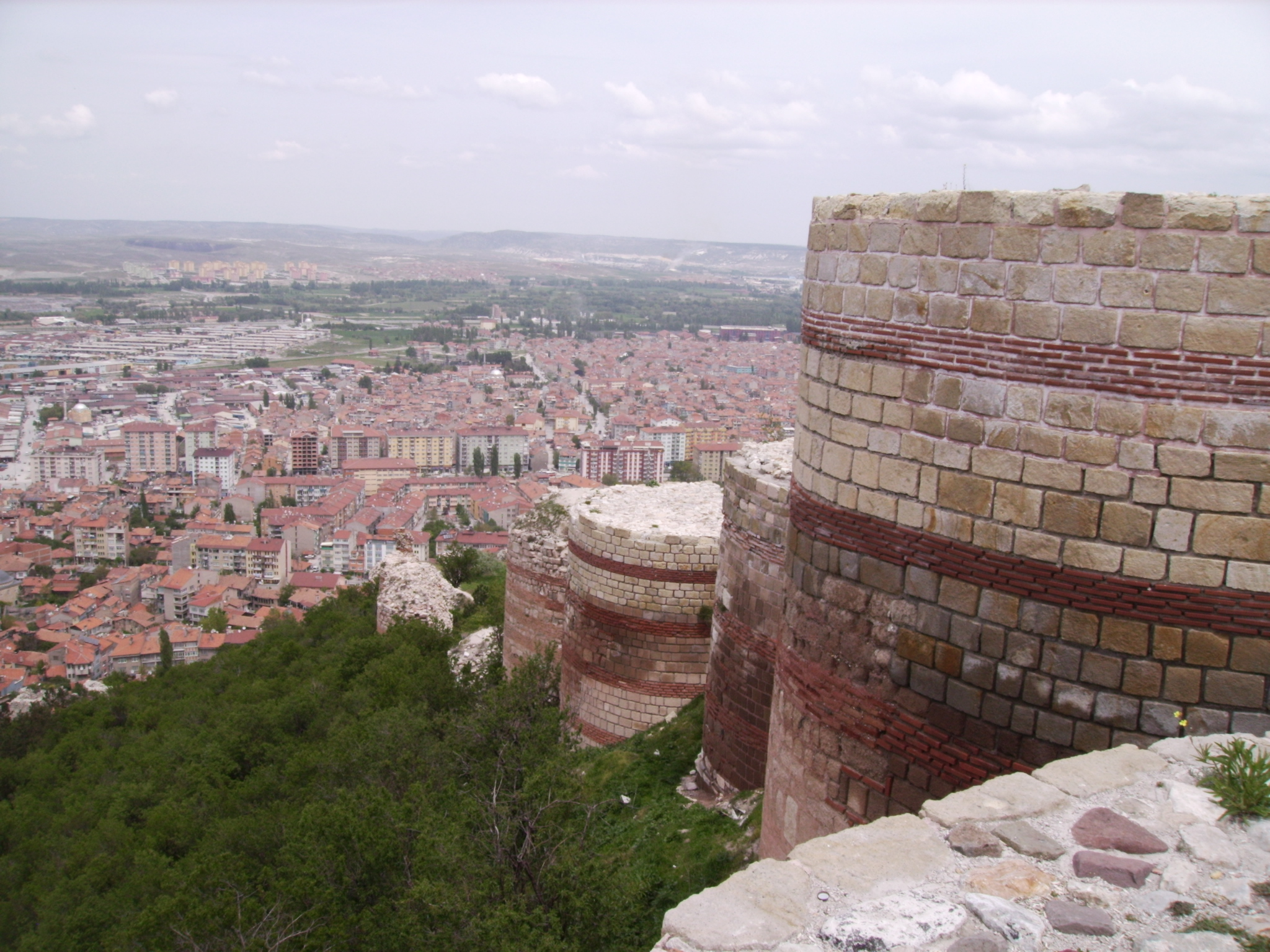
Kütahya Castle

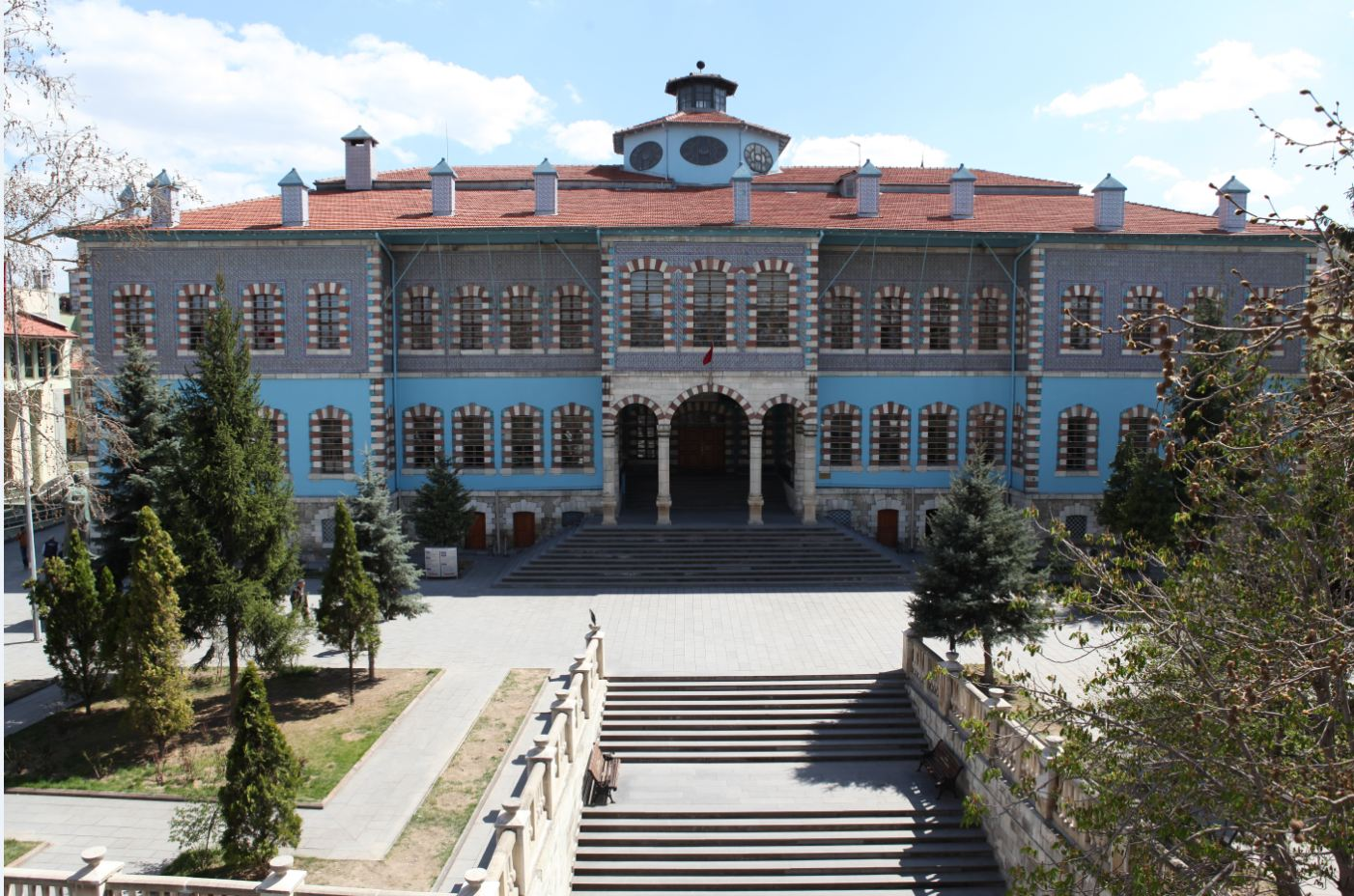
Government House

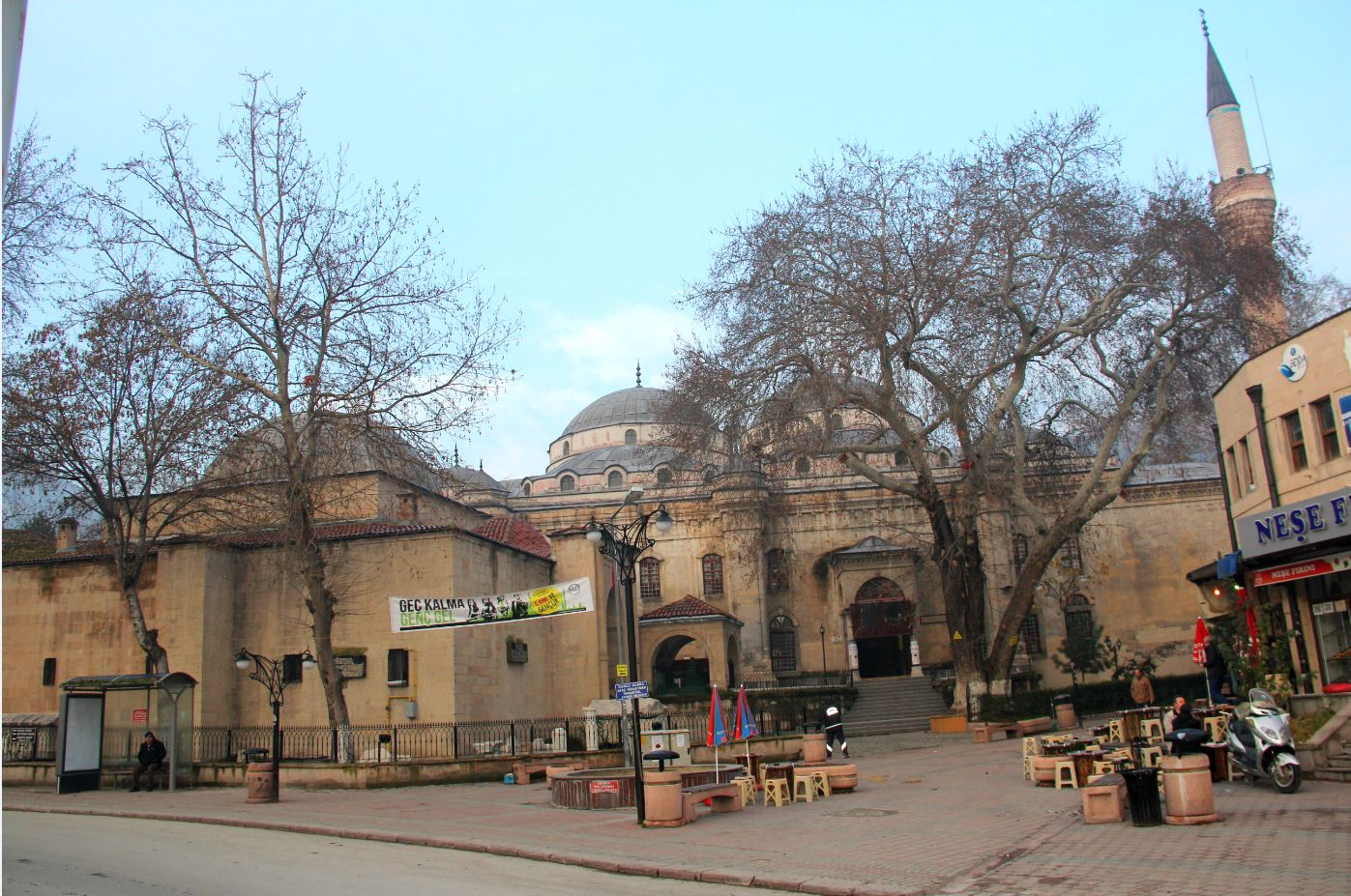
Grand Mosque
