= Kumarı, Kütahya =

Kumarı
- Neighbourhood
- Location in Turkey Kumarı (Turkey Aegean)
- Coordinates: 39°24′22″N 29°55′14″E
- Country: Turkey
- Province: Kütahya
- District: Kütahya
- Municipality: Kütahya
- Population (2022): 172
- Time zone: UTC+3 (TRT)

Kumarı is a neighbourhood of the city Kütahya, Kütahya District, Kütahya Province, Turkey. Its population is 172 (2022). Its elevation is 1,276 m (4,186 ft).
