= Phrygian Way =

Long-distance trail in Turkey

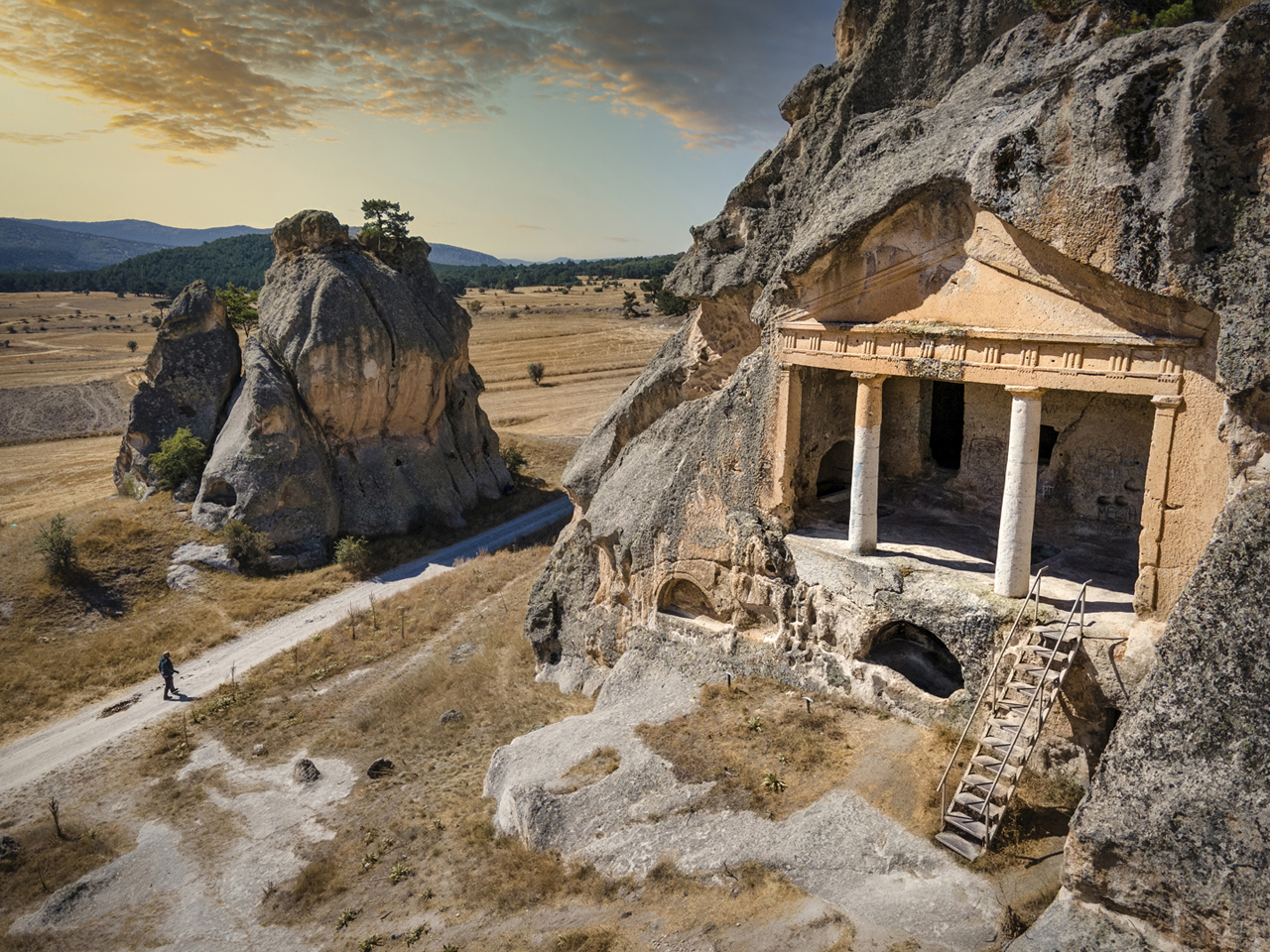
- Phrygian Valley
- Length: 506 km (314 mi)
- Location: western Turkey
- Established: 2013; 13 years ago
- Trailheads: Seydiler, Afyonkarahisar, Yenice Çiftliği, Kütahya; Gordion, Ankara
- Use: Hiking, Cycling
- Sights: Historic Phrygian ruins
- Website: www.frigyolu.com

The Phrygian Way (Turkish: Frig Yolu) is a marked long-distance hiking and bicycle trail in western Turkey, in part of the ancient Phrygia.

== History ==
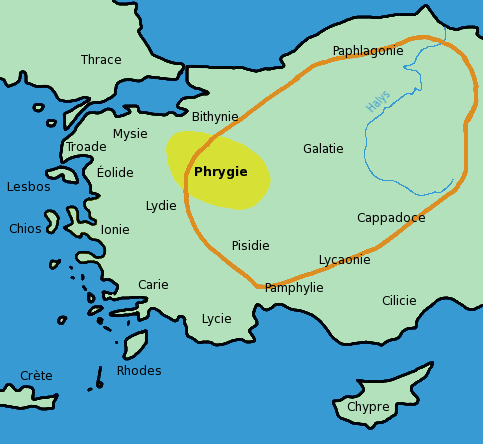
Map of Phrygia with traditional region (yellow) and its maximal expansion (red).

Phrygia was a kingdom in the classical antiquity, which existed between c. 1200–700 BC and situated in the west central part of Anatolia, in today's Turkey. The Phrygians, who came to that region from Thrace crossing the Straits, were engaged in agriculture and animal husbandry, in mining and weaving. They produced new musical instruments, developed a unique architecture and built temples and rock-cut tombs. They were one of the dominant powers in Anatolia in the Early Iron Age (9–7th century BC).

== Conception and opening ==
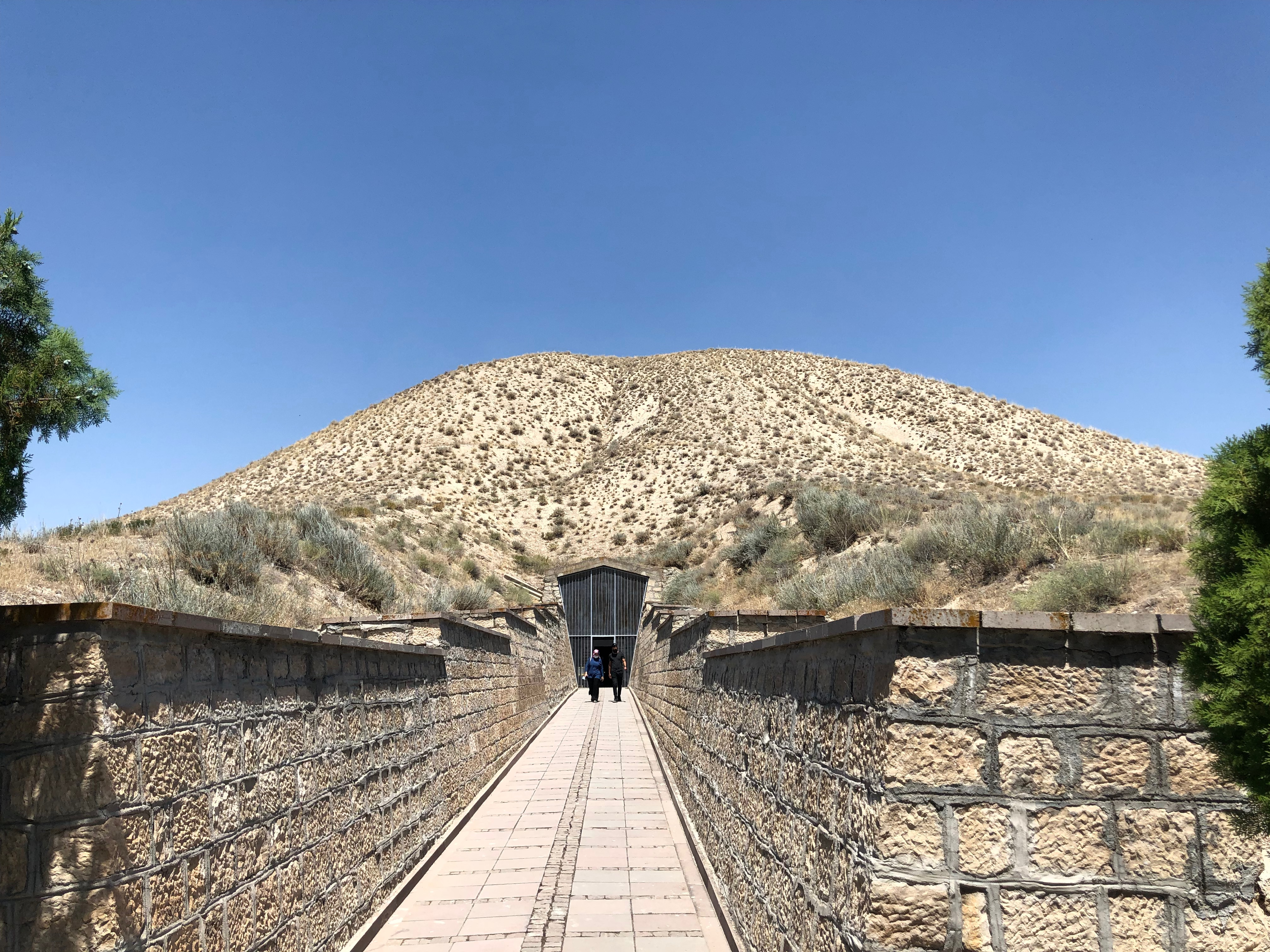
Entrance to the Tomb of Phrygian king Midas in Gordion.

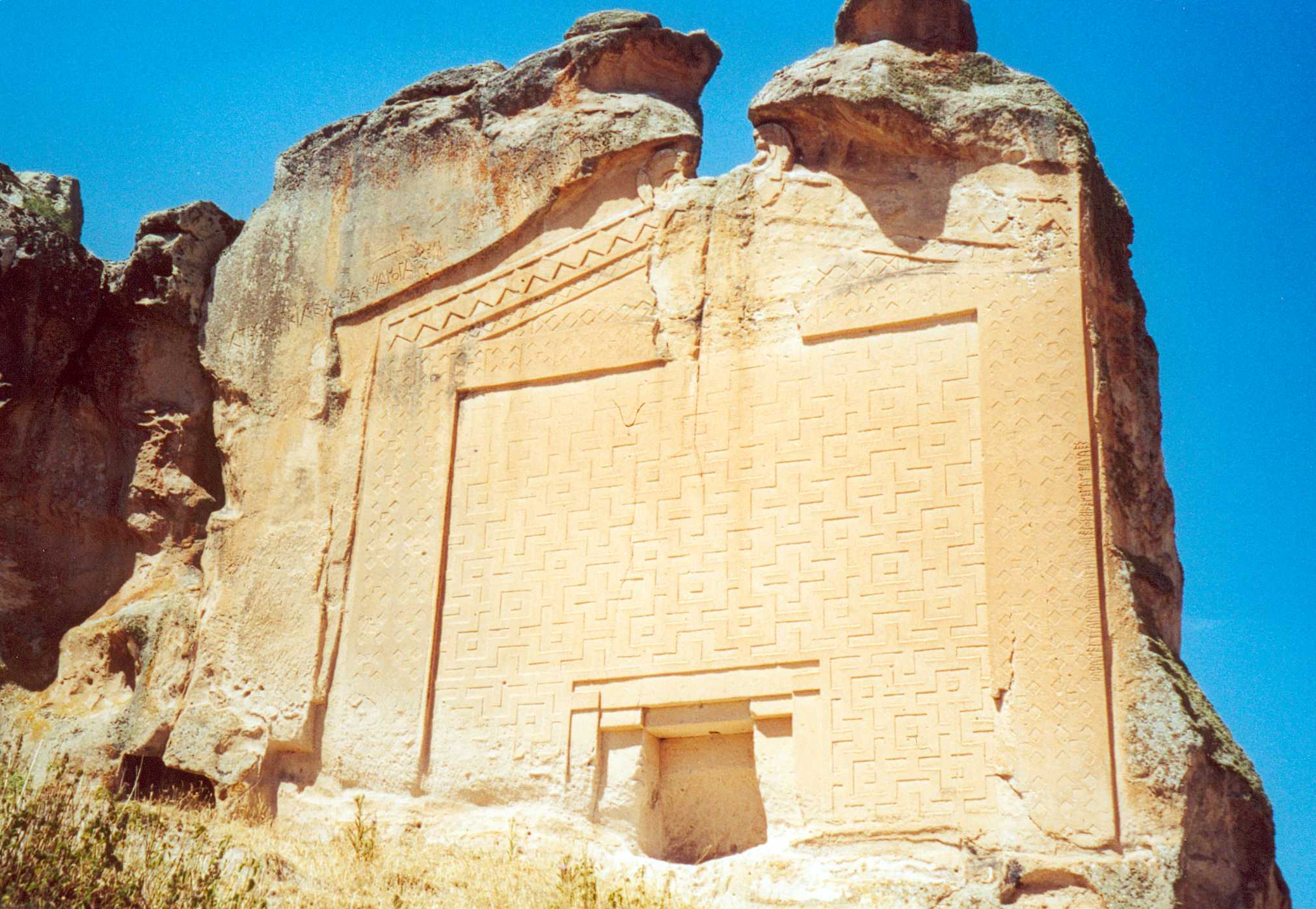
Tomb of King Midas in Midas City. The relief is 17 m (56 ft) high and dates from the 6th century BC.

The Phrygian Way is located in the valleys between the neighboring provinces of Ankara-Afyonkarahisar-Kütahya-Eskişehir-Uşak-Burdur, based on the roads used by the Phrygians.

Starting from three different places, from Seydiler, İscehisar in Afyonkarahisar, from Yenice Çiftliği in Kütahya, and from Gordion, the political capital of Phrygia in Polatlı district, Ankara, the routes converge in Phrygian Yazılıkaya or Midas City in Han district of Eskişehir, a Phrygian religious center. The total length of the Phrygian Way is 506 km (314 mi) making it the third longest hiking trail in Turkey. The Route 1 (in Afyonkarahisar) is 140 km (87 mi) long, the Route 2 (in Kütahya) is 147 km (91 mi) and the Route 3 (in Eskişehir) is 200 km (120 mi) and (in Ankara) 20 km (12 mi).

A project named "Phrygian Cultural Heritage Conservation and Development Union" (Turkish: Frigya Kültürel Mirasını Koruma ve Kalkınma Birliği, FRİGKÜM) was launched to establish the Frygian Way. The trail was completed in 2013 by a team of volunteers, who took part in the project, by combining the existing pathway, ancient ruins and forest roads in the region in an effort of about five years. The trail runs through 44 villages and five town in eight districts of four provinces in the Aegean and Central Anatolia regions of Turkey. The entire route is marked with red and white colors according to international standards. There are 109 poles and 217 direction signs. Informative signposts are placed at 73 places. The starting points of the three routes are indicated by a 2 m × 4 m (6 ft 7 in × 13 ft 1 in)-sized board.

== Trails ==
The trail is named after the Phrygian civilization that ruled around three thousand years ago partly in the region of western and central Anatolia. It consists of three trails, which start at a different place, run from different directions converging in one place situated in a center. The total length of the trails are 506 km (314 mi). The trails are located in the so-called "Phrygian Valleys" offering trekking and cycling opportunities. A guidebook written by the FRİGKÜM Project leader, Hüseyin Sarı, describes the routes with maps.

=== Route Seydiler – Yazılıkaya ===
The 140 km (87 mi)-long trail is located in north of Afyonkarahisar Province and partly in southern Eskişehir Province. Starting in Seydiler, it generally runs in northwards direction through Karakaya, Alanyurt, Selimiye in the İscehisar district, Eskieymir, Ayazini, Göynüş Valley, Demirli, Bayramaliler, Aslantaş-Yılantaş, Döğer, Urumkuş Rocks, Sarıcaova in İhsaniye district, Gökbahçe, Oynaş, Gökçegüney in Seyitgazi district and ends in Yazlıkaya (Midas City).

=== Route Yenice Çiftliği – Yazılıkaya ===
The 147 km (91 mi)-long trail is located in Kütahya Province and partly in southern Eskişehir Province. Starting in Yenice Çiftliği, it runs in southeastwards direction through Seydiköy, Sabuncupınar, Fındıkköy, Doğluşah, Sökmen, İnli, Yumaklı, Lütfiye villages in Kütahya and Sandiközü, Salihler, Kümbet, Çukurca in Seyitgazi district of Eskişehir Province and ends in Yazılıkaya (Midas City.

=== Route Yassıhöyük – Yazılıkaya ===
The approx. 220 km (140 mi)-long trail is located partly in west of Ankara Province and in southern Eskişehir Province. Starting in Yassıhöyük (Gordion), it runs southwestwards through Beylikköprü, Demirci villages in Polatlı district of Amkara Province and Mülk, Nasrettinhoca, Koçaş, İstiklalbağı, Ballıhisar (Pessinus), Ertuğrulköy, Ahiler, Balıkdamı, Kurtşeyh, Buzluca, Gülçayır, Çandır in Sivrihisar district, Ağaçköy, Doğanay, Beyören, Arslanlı in Çifteler district, Başara, Han, Ağlarca Han district of Eskişehir Province and ends in Yazılıkaya (Midas City).

== Points of interest ==
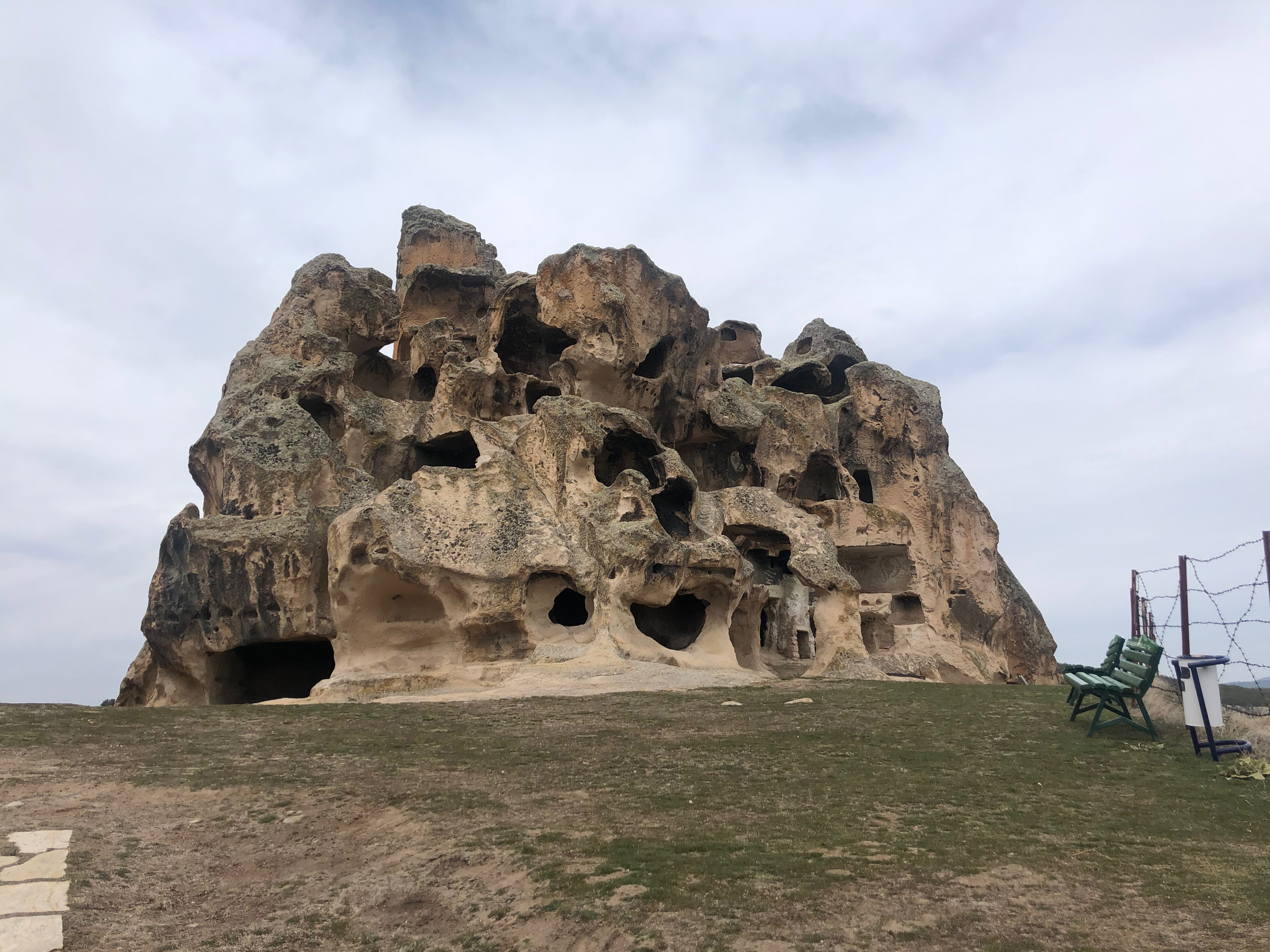
"Rock of the Forty Eyes" in Midas City.

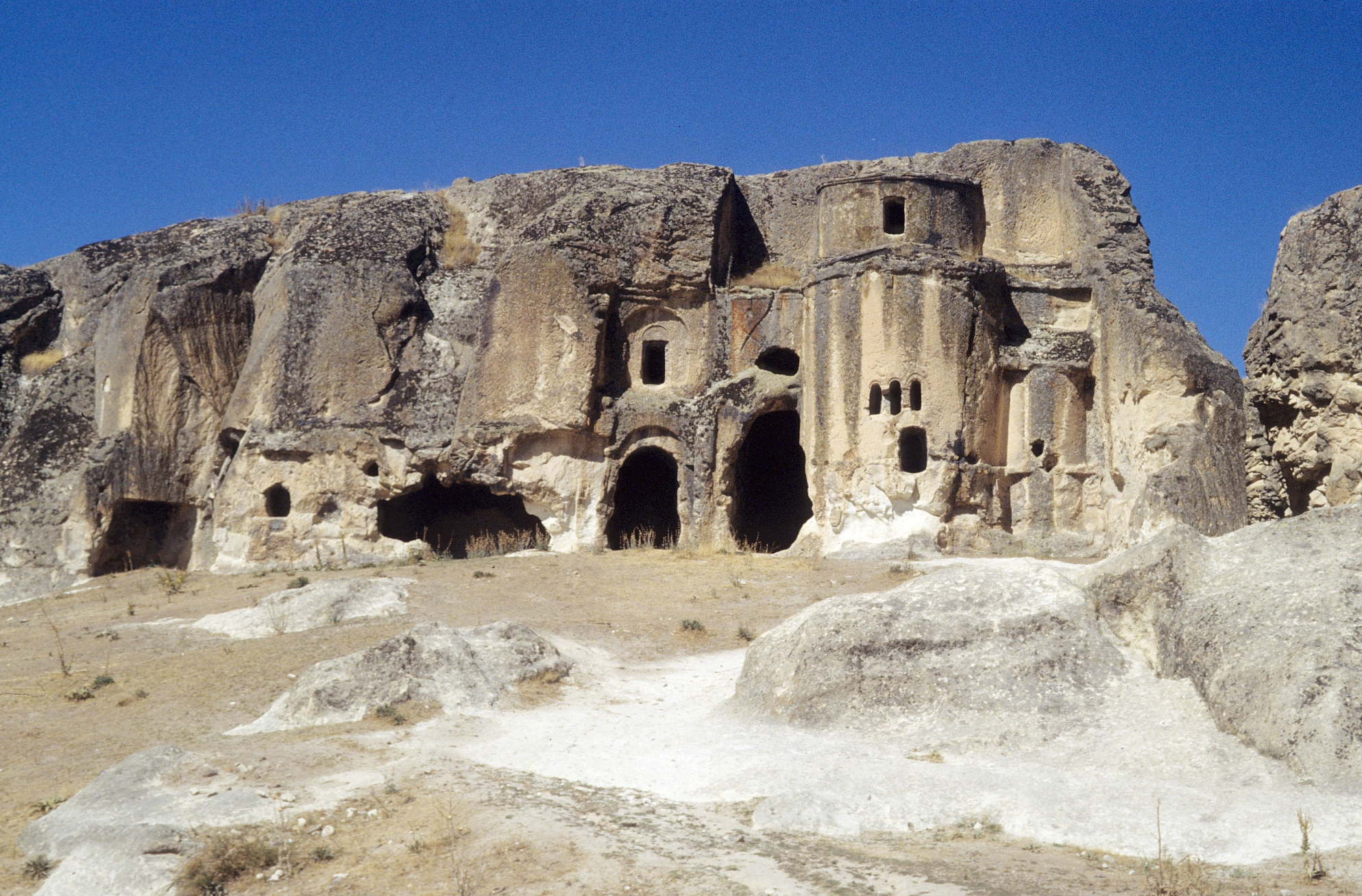
Rock-cut Byzantine church in Ayazini

The region offers geologically interesting formations like fairy chimneys in addition to historic sites with rock-cut dwellings, rock-cut tombs, temples, churches etc. from the eras of Phrygia, Roman Empire, Byzantine Empire, Seljuk Empire and Ottoman Empire.

- Seydiler town: Fairy chimneys, a Byzantine-era castle with a chapel and Phrygian-era Kırkinler rock,
- Selimiye Sarıçayır) village: Byzantine-era rock-cut tomb chambers with reliefs,
- Ayazini village: Byzantine-era rock dwellings, rock-cut tomb chambers and rock-cut church,

== See also ==
- List of long-distance trails

== Books ==
- Sarı, Hüseyin (2013). Phrygian Way – Official Guidebook. FRİGKÜM. p. 228. ISBN 978-605-86778-3-8.
