= Emet mine =

Boron mine in Turkey

- Location: Emet, Kütahya, Turkey
- Products: Boron

The Emet mine is a large boron ore mine located at Kütahya Province in western Turkey. Emet represents one of the largest boron reserves in Turkey having an estimated reserve of 1.68 billion tonnes of ore grading 28% boron. Most of this comes in the form of colemanite. The Emet mines together account for 40% of the world's known colemanite reserves.

The Emet mines consist of two open-pit mines at Espey and Hisarcık. Together, they produce 1.5 megatonnes of colemanite ore per year. About 240,000 tonnes per year of this production goes to the two boric acid refineries on site at Emet. Much of the rest is sent to Bandırma, which is the main logistics hub for Turkey's boron industry.

The Emet mining operation is managed by the state-run company Eti Maden. The Emet mining operation was established in 1958. The first boric acid refinery opened in 2005, and the second opened in 2011. Additionally, in 2015, a facility for producing specialized boric acid products was opened. Overall, the Emet mining and refining operation employs about 1,500 people.
