= Yenice Çiftliği =

- Hamlet
- Location in Turkey
- Coordinates: 39.53416°N 30.06450°E
- Country: Turkey
- Province: Kütahya
- District: Kütahya
- Time zone: UTC+3 (TRT)
- Postal code: 43270
- Area code: 0274
- Licence plate: 43

Yenice Çiftliği is a hamlet (bağlı) of the Ahmetoluğu village in the Kütahya District of Kütahya Province, Turkey. In September 2022, it was registered as a "Qualified Natural Protection Area" (Turkish: Nitelikli Doğal Koruma Alan) One of the routes of the Phrygian Way, a marked long-distance hiking and bicycle trail, starts at this place.
