= Pazarlar =

- Municipality
- Location in Turkey Pazarlar (Turkey Aegean)
- Coordinates: 39°00′N 29°08′E
- Country: Turkey
- Province: Kütahya
- District: Pazarlar
- Elevation: 950 m (3,120 ft)
- Population (2022): 3,012
- Time zone: UTC+3 (TRT)
- Area code: 0274

Pazarlar is a town in Kütahya Province in the Aegean region of Turkey. It is the seat of Pazarlar District. Its population is 3,012 (2022).
