= Iskome =

Town of ancient Phrygia

Coordinates: 39°03′26″N 30°01′40″E

Iskome was a town of ancient Phrygia, inhabited in Roman and Byzantine times.

Its site is tentatively located near Akçaköy in Kütahya Province, Asiatic Turkey.
