= Aslantaş =

'Aslantaş, meaning "Lionstone", is a Turkish compound word. It may refer to:

- Aslantaş Dam, a dam on Seyhan River in Osmaniye Provinceü Turkey
- Aslantaş-Yılantaş, two Phrygian monumental rock-cut tombs in Afyonkarahisar Province, Turkey
- Karatepe-Aslantaş National Park, a national park in Osmaniye Province, Turkey
- Arslan Taş, ancient Hadātu, an archaeological site in northern Syria
