= Seyitömer =

- Municipality
- Location in Turkey Seyitömer (Turkey Aegean)
- Coordinates: 39°36′55″N 29°53′24″E
- Country: Turkey
- Province: Kütahya
- District: Kütahya
- Population (2022): 1,978
- Time zone: UTC+3 (TRT)

Seyitömer is a town (belde) in the Kütahya District, Kütahya Province, Turkey. Its population is 1,978 (2022).
