= Meiros Megale =

Town of ancient Phrygia

Coordinates: 39°17′31″N 30°18′34″E

Meiros Megale was a town of ancient Phrygia, inhabited during Roman and Byzantine times.

Its site is located near Avdan-Teşvikiye in Asiatic Turkey.
