= Çalköy =

Çalköy may refer to:

- Çalköy, Alaca
- Çalköy, Aslanapa, Kütahya Province, Turkey
- Çalköy, Gümüşhacıköy, Amasya Province, Turkey
- Çalköy, Kargı
- Çalköy, Vezirköprü, Samsun Province, Turkey
- Çalköy, Yenice
