= Emet =

- Municipality
- Location within Turkey Location within Turkey Aegean
- Coordinates: 39°20′N 29°16′E
- Country: Turkey
- Province: Kütahya
- District: Emet

Government
  - Mayor: Mustafa Koca (MHP)
- Population (2022): 11,431
- Time zone: UTC+3 (TRT)
- Area code: 0274
- Website: www.emet.bel.tr

Emet is a town in Kütahya Province in the Aegean region of Turkey. It is the seat of Emet District. Its population is 11,431 (2022).

Emet mine, a large boron mine, is located a few miles north of the city. The mine is owned by Eti Boron Inc. (a.ş).

Emet is located in the valley of the Emet Çayı stream, 62 km west of the city of Kütahya. There is a hot spring in the lower part of the town.

Various ruin fragments and inscriptions in Emet, and especially in the cemetery on the east side of town, indicate that there was a decently large settlement here in ancient times. For example, by the hot springs there are the ruins of an old bathhouse attributed to the Byzantine period. Emet may represent the site of the ancient and medieval town of Tiberiopolis, although other candidates have also been proposed.
