= Bayat, Kütahya =

Village in Kütahya district, Kütahya province, Turkey

Bayat
- Village
- Location in Turkey Bayat (Turkey Aegean)
- Coordinates: 39°20′43″N 29°48′58″E
- Country: Turkey
- Province: Kütahya
- District: Kütahya
- Population (2022): 112
- Time zone: UTC+3 (TRT)

Bayat is a village in Kütahya District of Kütahya Province, Turkey. As of 2022, its population is 112.

Bayat is located about 16 km southwest of Kütahya, in the highland region between the Porsuk Çayı and the Koca Dere (an upper part of the Mustafakemalpaşa River). Several architecture fragments dated to the Byzantine period indicate that there was an old settlement on or near the site. About 2 km away, in a valley near the place called Eski Köy, there are also some poorly preserved stone remains which indicate the site of what was probably a medieval Turkic settlement.
