= Altıntaş =

- Municipality
- Location in Turkey Altıntaş (Turkey Aegean)
- Coordinates: 39°03′41″N 30°06′35″E
- Country: Turkey
- Province: Kütahya
- District: Altıntaş

Government
  - Mayor: Hikmet Tunç (MHP)
- Population (2022): 5,258
- Time zone: UTC+3 (TRT)
- Area code: 0274
- Website: www.altintas.bel.tr

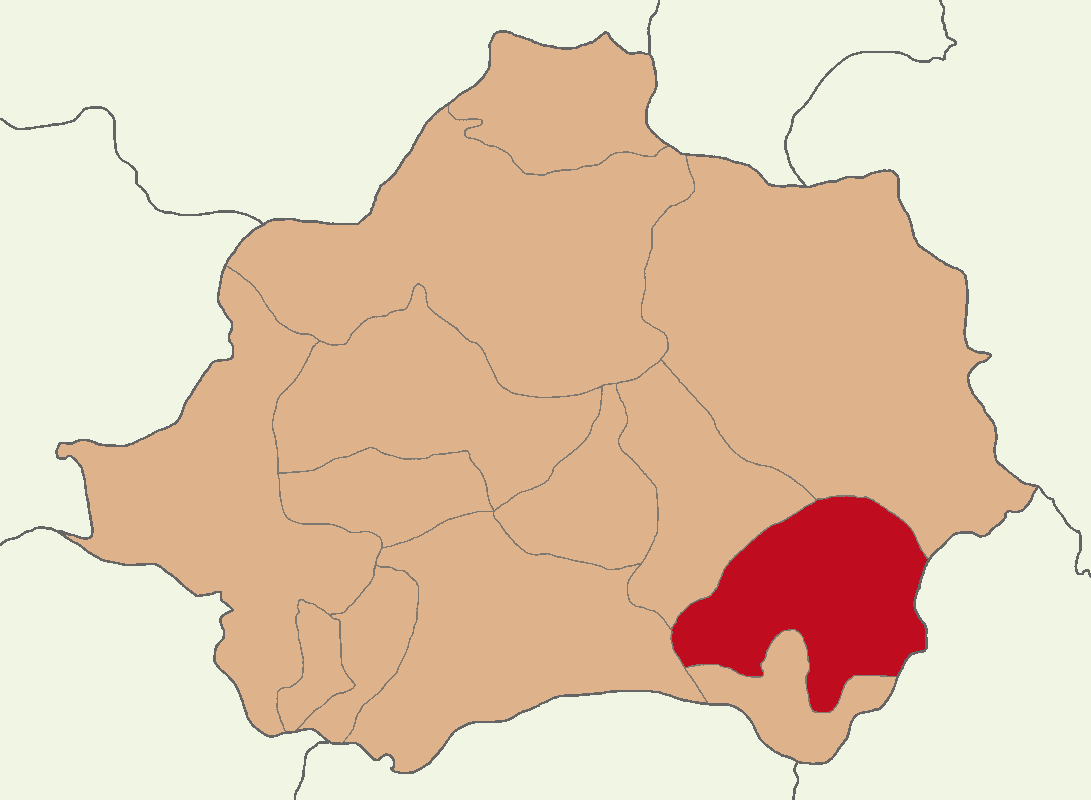
Location in the province

Altıntaş is a town in Kütahya Province in the Aegean region of Turkey. It is the seat of Altıntaş District. Its population is 5,258 (2022).

== History ==
Altıntaş was previously known as "Kurtköy". The district's name means "goldstone" in Turkish and was given due to the large stone deposits, especially marble deposits in the area.

Chalcolithic artifacts have been found in the Altıntaş area. The Roman city of Soa is located within the district boundaries. The marble in the area was mined in antiquity, having been used in the construction of the ancient city of Aizanoi nearby. Near today's Pınarcık village, a Roman city called "Abya" produced its own coins. In the Osmaniye village, a mausoleum from the 2nd or 3rd century AD was excavated. In the district center of Altıntaş, a tomb called the Seydisül Tomb, built in the late 19th or early 20th century, contains an arch from the Byzantine era, depicting Deesis.

During the reign of the Ottoman sultan Bayezid II, a rebellion was suppressed at a battle in Altıntaş.

Early in the Greco-Turkish War during the Turkish War of Independence, the area was occupied by the Greek forces. Parts of the Battle of Dumlupınar took place within the district boundaries; these areas were later declared a national park. Altıntaş became a district in 1947.
