= Doğluşah, Kütahya =

Doğluşah
- Village
- Location within Turkey Location within Turkey Aegean
- Coordinates: 39.5217°N 30.1884°E
- Country: Turkey
- Province: Kütahya
- District: Kütahya
- Population (2022): 233
- Time zone: UTC+3 (TRT)
- Postal code: 43270
- Area code: 0274

Doğluşah is a village in the Kütahya District of Kütahya Province, Turkey. Its population is 233 (2022).

Agriculture and animal husbandry are the mean economy of the village. Extraction of feldspar, which is used in the glassmaking, ceramic and paint industry, is also an important business section in the area.

Doğluşah is on the Phrygian Way, a marked long-distance hiking and bicycle trail.

== Population ==
Historical population
Year	Pop.	±% p.a.
2007	206	—
2012	169	−3.88%
2017	158	−1.34%
2022	233	+8.08%
Source: TÜIK (2007-2022)
