= Eğrigöz =

Village in Emet district, Kütahya province, Turkey

- Village
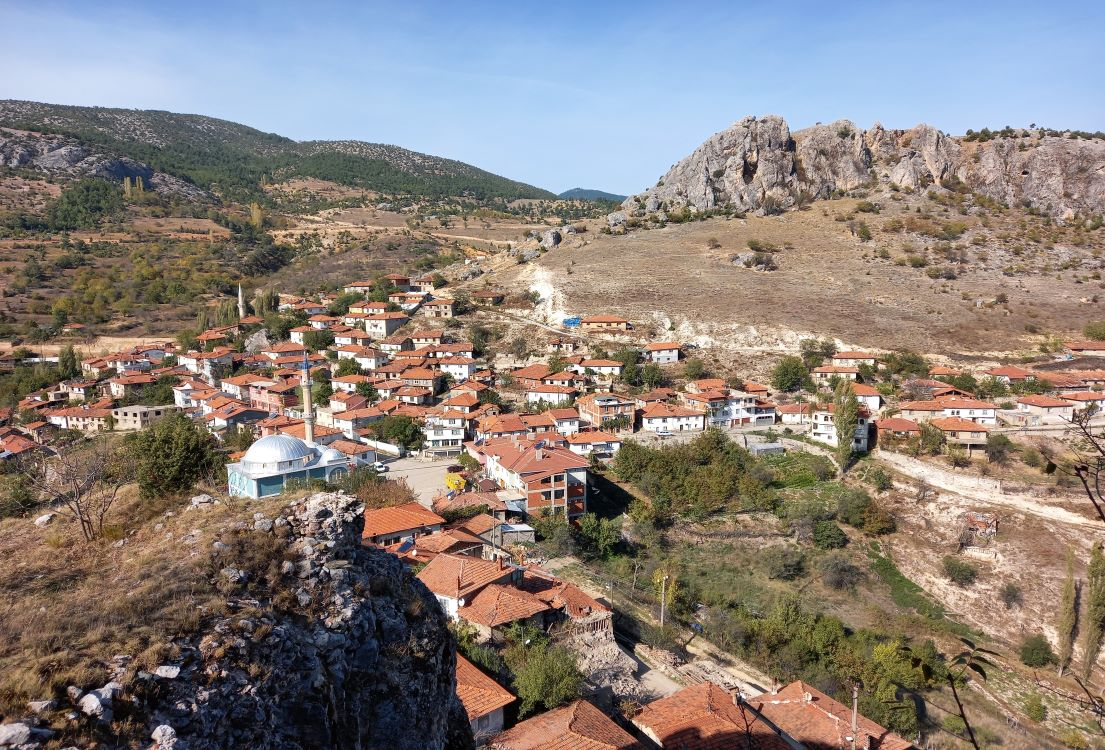

- Location within Turkey Location within Turkey Aegean
- Coordinates: 39°24′32″N 29°13′51″E
- Country: Turkey
- Province: Kütahya
- District: Emet
- Population (2022): 172
- Time zone: UTC+3 (TRT)

Eğrigöz is a village in Emet District of Kütahya Province, Turkey. As of 2022, its population is 172. Eğrigöz is known for its old fortress, which is on a hill just east of the village. It was also a district capital under Ottoman rule in the early modern period.

== Geography ==
The village of Eğrigöz is located just west of the Emet Çayı stream, on a saddle-like landform connecting two rocky hills. The western hill is a cone-shaped rocky outcrop, while immediately above the village on the east is a steep rocky hill topped by a small plateau. On this plateau is the old fortress. Below the plateau is a rocky shelf that drops off sharply on the north, south, and east sides, making the fortress only accessible from the west side. The Emet Çayı flows below the east side of this hill.

Eğrigöz is 64 km west of Kütahya, the province capital.

== Fortress ==
The fortress of Eğrigöz consists of a series of walls enclosing the eastern hill's lower shelf on the west, south, and east sides. There is no wall on the north side, but the drop-off here is extremely steep and the lower shelf is extremely narrow. There are three towers: one on the west side, and then ones at the northeast and southeast corners. There may have also been another watchtower on top of the plateau. On the hill's east side, on the slope below the lower shelf, there are remains of a short section of wall along with a square tower; these were probably part of a lower ring of walls. On the north side, there are three cisterns, variously made of brick or carved directly into the rock. The fortress could only be accessed from the west side, and access was controlled by two gates on the steep western slope leading up to the lower shelf.

== History ==
Eğrigöz may possibly be identical to the medieval Byzantine place called Akrokos (Greek: Άκροκός), which was mentioned in the 9th century as a bandon in the theme of Opsikion. (The bandon of Akrokos also included a town called Tiberiopolis, whose location is also unknown.) It was later mentioned in 1113 in connection with the campaigns of the emperor Alexios I Komnenos. However, contemporary references to Akrokos are vague about its location, and they seem to contradict each other, so the identification of it with Eğrigöz is highly uncertain.

In 1381, Eğrigöz was one of several towns ceded from Germiyanid control to the early Ottoman Empire, as part of the wedding dowry of Devletşah Hatun, who was married to the Ottoman prince (and future sultan) Bayezid I.

In 1442, Vlad the Impaler and his brother Radu the Handsome were kept for four years in the fortress of Eğrigöz as hostages of the Ottoman sultan Murad II.

The Tapu Defter #438, from the reign of Süleyman the Magnificent, listed Eğrigöz as a kazâ in the Sanjak of Kütahya.
