= Göçeri =

Göçeri (literally "nomadic" in Turkish) may refer to:

- Göçeri, Hamamözü, a village in the district of Hamamözü, Amasya Province, Turkey
- Göçeri, Kahta, a village in the district of Kahta, Adıyaman Province, Turkey
- Göçeri, Kütahya, a village in Kütahya district of Kütahya province, Turkey
- Pileri, a village in district of Kyrenia (Girne), Cyprus, also known as Göçeri in Turkish
