= Fındıkköy =

Fındıkköy is a Turkish word. It may refer to:

- Fındıkköy, Kütahya, a village in the Merkez (Central) district of Kütahya Province, Turkey
- Fındıkköy, Osmancık, a village in the Osmancık district of Çorum Province, Turkey
