= Aslanapa =

Town in Kütahya Province, Turkey

- Municipality
- Location in Turkey Aslanapa (Turkey Aegean)
- Coordinates: 39°13′N 29°52′E
- Country: Turkey
- Province: Kütahya
- District: Aslanapa
- Population (2022): 1,793
- Time zone: UTC+3 (TRT)
- Area code: 0274

Aslanapa is a town in Kütahya Province in the Aegean region of Turkey. It is the seat of Aslanapa District. Its population is 1,793 (2022).

== Name ==
According to art historian Oktay Aslanapa, the name Aslanapa comes from an Ildeniz Turkmen group of the lineage of Arslan Apa who migrated after the Battle of Malazgirt from the Nakhchivan region to where Aslanapa is now. According to literary scholar Cevdet Dadaş, the name Arslan Apa was a title of respect for a legendary hero, “Older Brother Lion” (Turkish: arslan + apa).

== History ==
Settlements in the Aslanapa area date back to the Early Bronze Age. The area was ruled by the Byzantines, the Germiyans, and then in 1429 the Ottomans. The Ottomans called the area Gireği. In 1675-76, Aslanapa included 42 reaya households and 1 imam.

In 1921, during the Turkish War of Independence, the area was occupied by the Greeks, who were expelled a year later.

== Handicrafts ==
Local handicrafts include Kütahya-style tilemaking, lace making, and weaving.
