= Çalköy, Aslanapa =

Village in Aslanapa district, Kütahya province, Turkey

Çalköy
- Village
- Location in Turkey Çalköy (Turkey Aegean)
- Coordinates: 39°9′40″N 29°54′26″E
- Country: Turkey
- Province: Kütahya
- District: Aslanapa
- Population (2022): 533
- Time zone: UTC+3 (TRT)

Çalköy is a village in Aslanapa District of Kütahya Province, Turkey. As of 2022, its population is 533.

Çalköy is located on the upper reaches of the Avşar Deresi, which is a tributary of the Porsuk Çayı. It is 56 km south of Kütahya, the province capital, and 44 km northwest of Afyonkarahisar. About 2 km east of the village is a ruin site called Ahmet Bey Mevkii, with finds including an architrave dated to the middle Byzantine period. Some ancient spolia reused as building material has also been found in the village of Çalköy itself.
