= Hisarcık District =

District of Kütahya Province, Turkey

- District
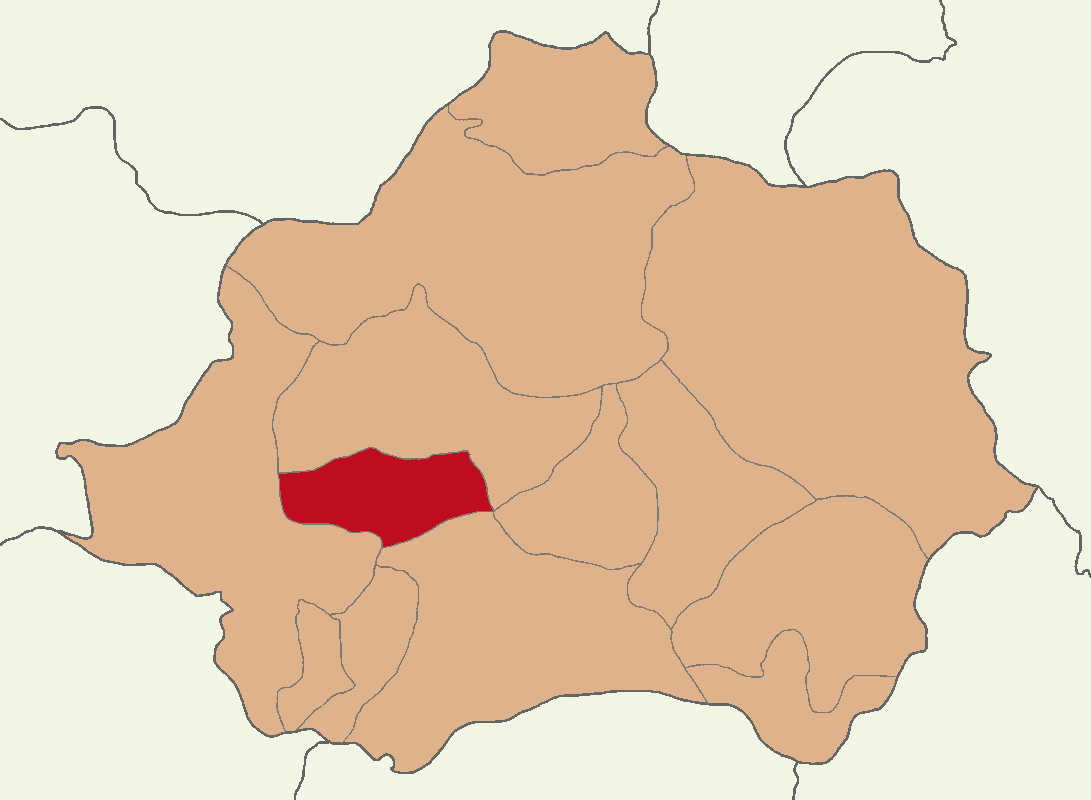
- Map showing Hisarcık District in Kütahya Province

- Location in Turkey Hisarcık District (Turkey Aegean)
- Coordinates: 39°15′N 29°14′E
- Country: Turkey
- Province: Kütahya
- Seat: Hisarcık

Government
  - Kaymakam: İsmail Tosun
- Area: 370 km^{2} (140 sq mi)
- Population (2022): 11,115
  - Density: 30/km^{2} (78/sq mi)
- Time zone: UTC+3 (TRT)
- Website: www.hisarcik.gov.tr

Hisarcık District is a district of the Kütahya Province of Turkey. Its seat is the town of Hisarcık. Its area is 370 km^{2}, and its population is 11,115 (2022).

== Composition ==
There is one municipality in Hisarcık District:

- Hisarcık

There are 25 villages in Hisarcık District:

- Alınören
- Aşağıyoncaağaç
- Beyköy
- Çatak
- Dereköy
- Güldüren
- Halifeler
- Hamamköy
- Hasanlar
- Hocalar
- Karaağıl
- Karbasan
- Kızılçukur
- Kurtdere
- Kutlubeyler
- Kutluhallar
- Ören
- Saklar
- Sefaköy
- Şeyhçakır
- Şeyhler
- Tokat
- Ulaşlar
- Yenipınar
- Yukarıyoncaağaç
