= Sökmen, Kütahya =

Sökmen
- Village
- Location within Turkey Location within Turkey Aegean
- Coordinates: 39.50457°N 30.19061°E
- Country: Turkey
- Province: Kütahya
- District: Kütahya
- Population (2022): 67
- Time zone: UTC+3 (TRT)
- Postal code: 43270
- Area code: 0274

Sökmen is a village in the Kütahya District of Kütahya Province, Turkey. Its population is 67 (2022).

== Population ==
Historical population
Year	Pop.	±% p.a.
2007	66	—
2012	55	−3.58%
2017	48	−2.69%
2022	67	+6.90%
Source: TÜIK (2007-2022)
