= Emet District =

District of Kütahya Province, Turkey

- District
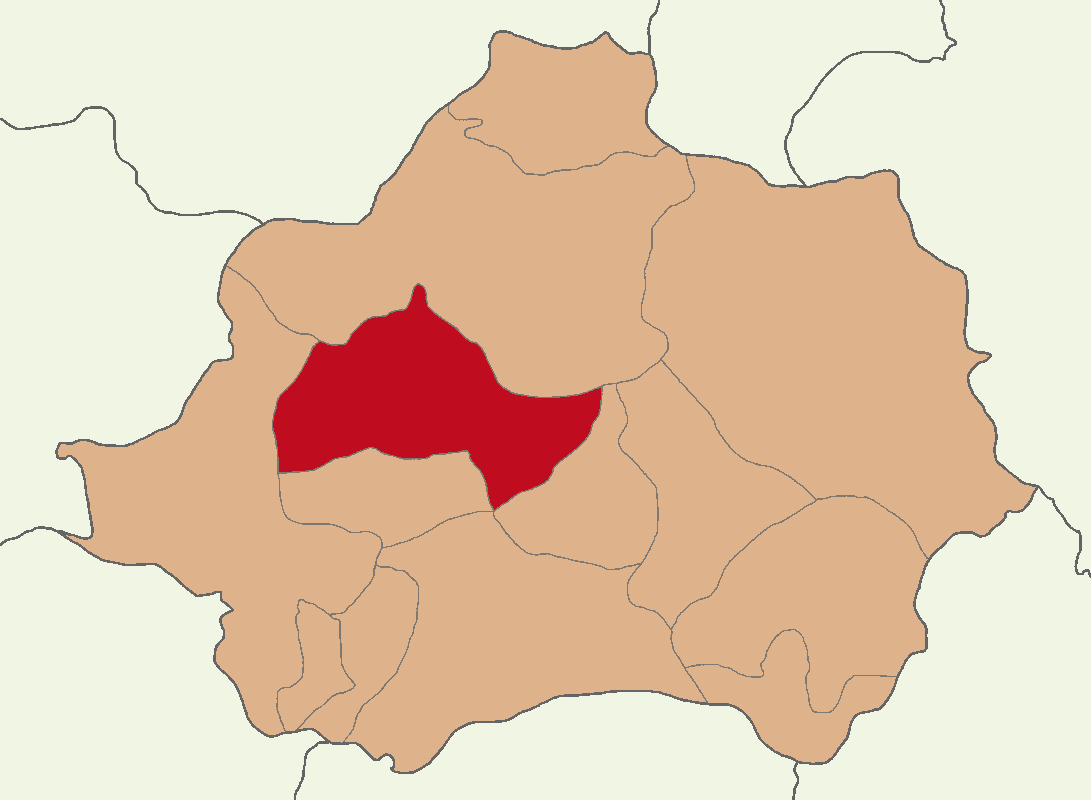
- Map showing Emet District in Kütahya Province

- Location in Turkey Emet District (Turkey Aegean)
- Coordinates: 39°20′N 29°16′E
- Country: Turkey
- Province: Kütahya
- Seat: Emet

Government
  - Kaymakam: Hasan Çiçek
- Area: 951 km^{2} (367 sq mi)
- Population (2022): 18,843
  - Density: 19.8/km^{2} (51.3/sq mi)
- Time zone: UTC+3 (TRT)
- Website: www.emet.gov.tr

Emet District is a district of the Kütahya Province of Turkey. Its seat is the town of Emet. Its area is 951 km^{2}, and its population is 18,843 (2022).

== Composition ==
There is one municipality in Emet District:

- Emet

There are 37 villages in Emet District:

- Abaş
- Aydıncık
- Bahatlar
- Çerte
- Dereli
- Doğanlar
- Düşecek
- Eğrigöz
- Esatlar
- Eseler
- Göncek
- Günlüce
- Gürpınar
- İğdeköy
- İkibaşlı
- Işıklı
- Kabaklar
- Kalfalar
- Katrandağı
- Kayı
- Kırgıl
- Konuş
- Köprücek
- Küreci
- Musalar
- Ömerfakı
- Örencik
- Samrık
- Sarıayak
- Subak
- Umutlu
- Uzunçam
- Yağcık
- Yarış
- Yaylayolu
- Yenice
- Yeniköy
