= Hisarcık =

- Municipality
- Location in Turkey Hisarcık (Turkey Aegean)
- Coordinates: 39°14′59″N 29°13′53″E
- Country: Turkey
- Province: Kütahya
- District: Hisarcık

Government
  - Mayor: Mustafa Demirtaş (MHP)
- Population (2022): 4,767
- Time zone: UTC+3 (TRT)
- Area code: 0274
- Website: www.hisarcik.bel.tr

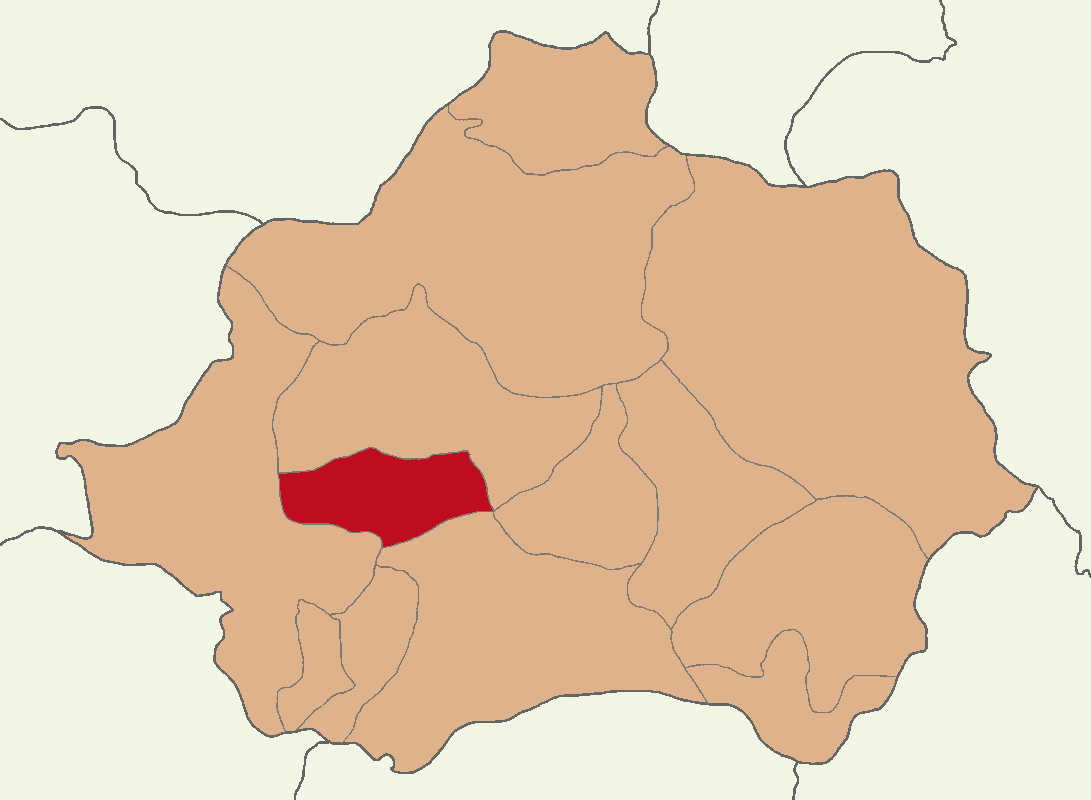
Shows location

Hisarcık is a town in Kütahya Province in the Aegean region of Turkey. It is the seat of Hisarcık District. Its population is 4,767 (2022).
