= Pazarlar District =

District of Kütahya Province, Turkey

- District
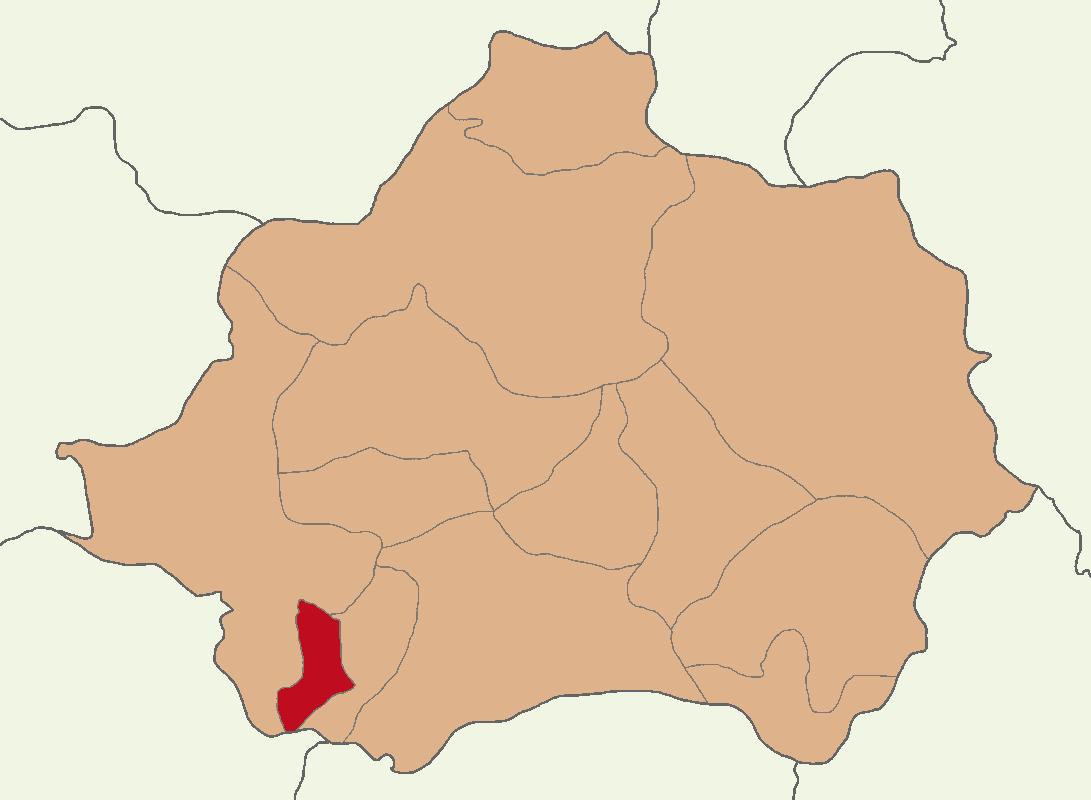
- Map showing Pazarlar District in Kütahya Province

- Location in Turkey Pazarlar District (Turkey Aegean)
- Coordinates: 39°00′N 29°08′E
- Country: Turkey
- Province: Kütahya
- Seat: Pazarlar

Government
  - Kaymakam: Özlem Doğan
- Area: 115 km^{2} (44 sq mi)
- Population (2022): 4,840
  - Density: 42/km^{2} (110/sq mi)
- Time zone: UTC+3 (TRT)
- Website: www.pazarlar.gov.tr

Pazarlar District is a district of the Kütahya Province of Turkey. Its seat is the town of Pazarlar. Its area is 115 km^{2}, and its population is 4,840 (2022).

== Composition ==
There is one municipality in Pazarlar District:

- Pazarlar

There are 7 villages in Pazarlar District:

- Akşinik
- Örey
- Orhanlar
- Sarayköy
- Sofular
- Tepeköy
- Yenice
