= Yumaklı, Kütahya =

Yumaklı
- Village
- Location within Turkey Location within Turkey Aegean
- Coordinates: 39.4156°N 30.2891°E
- Country: Turkey
- Province: Kütahya
- District: Kütahya
- Population (2022): 24
- Time zone: UTC+3 (TRT)
- Postal code: 43270
- Area code: 0274

Yumaklı is a village in the Kütahya District of Kütahya Province, Turkey. Its population is 24 (2022).

== Population ==
Historical population
Year	Pop.	±% p.a.
2007	25	—
2012	20	−4.36%
2017	27	+6.19%
2022	24	−2.33%
Source: TÜIK (2007-2022)
