= Teşvikiye, Kütahya =

Village in Kütahya district, Kütahya province, Turkey

Teşvikiye
- Village
- Location in Turkey Teşvikiye (Turkey Aegean)
- Coordinates: 39°17′8″N 30°18′49″E
- Country: Turkey
- Province: Kütahya
- District: Kütahya
- Population (2022): 17
- Time zone: UTC+3 (TRT)

Teşvikiye is a village in Kütahya District of Kütahya Province, Turkey. As of 2022, its population is 17.

Formerly known as Avdan, Teşvikiye is located in a highland area 35 km east-southeast of Kütahya. The present-day village was only established as a permanent settlement at the beginning of the 20th century, but it was built directly on the site of an earlier settlement. Some of the old ruins were demolished in the process. To the northeast of the village is an ancient Roman burial site, while on the south side of the village are the foundations of two buildings that were probably Christian churches. In the meadow east of the village is a structure known as the Hamam Yeri, which is now almost completely buried and has only been exposed in a few places. From what is visible, it seems to have been a vaulted structure made of bricks and flat stone slabs. Whether it represents another church or an Ottoman-era bathhouse is unclear.
