= Aslanapa District =

District of Kütahya Province, Turkey

- District
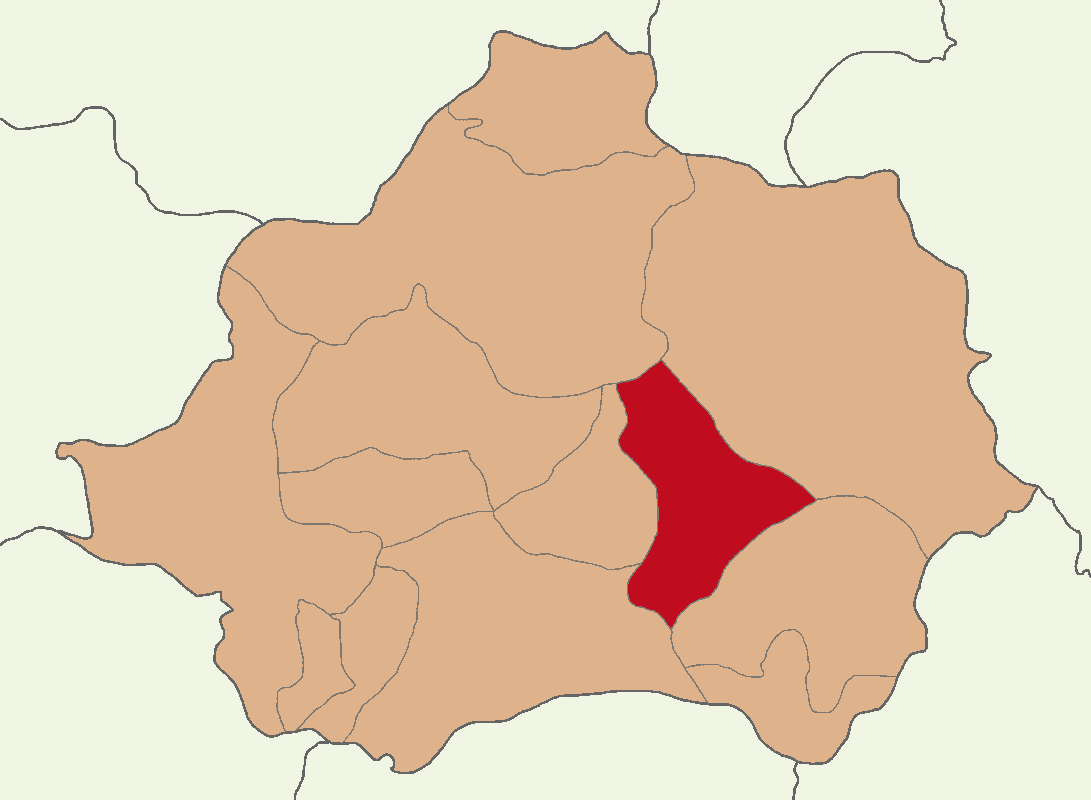
- Map showing Aslanapa District in Kütahya Province

- Location in Turkey Aslanapa District (Turkey Aegean)
- Coordinates: 39°13′N 29°52′E
- Country: Turkey
- Province: Kütahya
- Seat: Aslanapa

Government
  - Kaymakam: Mehmet Sevban Gökbunar
- Area: 731 km^{2} (282 sq mi)
- Population (2022): 8,164
  - Density: 11/km^{2} (29/sq mi)
- Time zone: UTC+3 (TRT)
- Website: www.aslanapa.gov.tr

Aslanapa District is a district of the Kütahya Province of Turkey. Its seat is the town of Aslanapa. Its area is 731 km^{2}, and its population is 8,164 (2022).

== Composition ==
There is one municipality in Aslanapa District:

- Aslanapa

There are 31 villages in Aslanapa District:

- Abaş
- Adaköy
- Aslıhanlar
- Ballıbaba
- Bayat
- Bayramşah
- Bezirgan
- Çakmak
- Çalköy
- Çamdibi
- Çamırdık
- Çömlekçi
- Çukurca
- Dereköy
- Emrez
- Esenköy
- Gölbaşı
- Göynükören
- Haydarlar
- Karadiğin
- Kureyşler
- Musaköy
- Nuhören
- Ören
- Ortaca
- Pazarcık
- Sarayköy
- Şenişler
- Terziler
- Tokul
- Yağcılar
