= Sabuncupınar, Kütahya =

Sabuncupınar
- Village
- Location within Turkey Location within Turkey Aegean
- Coordinates: 39.5620°N 30.1895°E
- Country: Turkey
- Province: Kütahya
- District: Kütahya
- Population (2022): 214
- Time zone: UTC+3 (TRT)
- Postal code: 43270
- Area code: 0274

Sabuncupınar is a village in the Kütahya District of Kütahya Province, Turkey. In 1928, its name was changed from Armudeli, or Armuteli, to Sabuncu Pınarı. Its population is 214 (2022).

Sabuncupınar is served by the Regional Railway line Eskişehir - Afyonkarahisar.

== Population ==
Historical population
Year	Pop.	±% p.a.
2007	260	—
2012	214	−3.82%
2017	219	+0.46%
2022	214	−0.46%
Source: TÜIK (2007-2022)
