= Seydiköy, Kütahya =

Seydiköy
- Village
- Location within Turkey Location within Turkey Aegean
- Coordinates: 39.5399°N 30.1261°E
- Country: Turkey
- Province: Kütahya
- District: Kütahya
- Population (2022): 123
- Time zone: UTC+3 (TRT)
- Postal code: 43270
- Area code: 0274

Seydiköy is a village in the Kütahya District of Kütahya Province, Turkey. Its population is 123 (2022).

In May 2017, a project for the establishment of a privately owned solar power plant (SPP) near the village was approved by the Ministry of Environment, Urbanisation and Climate Change. The SPP has an installed power of 9,975 kWp.

== Population ==
Historical population
Year	Pop.	±% p.a.
2007	165	—
2012	147	−2.28%
2017	131	−2.28%
2022	123	−1.25%
Source: TÜIK (2007-2022)
