= Soa (Phrygia) =

Town of ancient Phrygia

Coordinates: 39°04′36″N 30°13′01″E

Soa was a town of ancient Phrygia, inhabited in Roman and Byzantine times. Its name does not occur in ancient authors, but is inferred from epigraphic and other evidence.

Its site is located near Altıntaş in Asiatic Turkey.
