= İnli, Kütahya =

İnli
- Village
- Location within Turkey Location within Turkey Aegean
- Coordinates: 39.4761°N 30.2149°E
- Country: Turkey
- Province: Kütahya
- District: Kütahya
- Population (2022): 96
- Time zone: UTC+3 (TRT)
- Postal code: 43270
- Area code: 0274

İnli is a village in the Kütahya District of Kütahya Province, Turkey. Its population is 96 (2022).

== Population ==
Historical population
Year	Pop.	±% p.a.
2007	100	—
2012	104	+0.79%
2017	92	−2.42%
2022	96	+0.85%
Source: TÜIK (2007-2022)
