= Lütfiye, Kütahya =

Lütfiye
- Village
- Location within Turkey Location within Turkey Aegean
- Coordinates: 39.4051°N 30.3461°E
- Country: Turkey
- Province: Kütahya
- District: Kütahya
- Population (2022): 51
- Time zone: UTC+3 (TRT)
- Postal code: 43270
- Area code: 0274

Lütfiye is a village in the Kütahya District of Kütahya Province, Turkey. Its population is 51 (2022).

== Population ==
Historical population
Year	Pop.	±% p.a.
2007	47	—
2012	26	−11.17%
2017	37	+7.31%
2022	51	+6.63%
Source: TÜIK (2007-2022)
