= Göçeri, Kütahya =

Village in Kütahya district, Kütahya province, Turkey

Göçeri
- Village
- Location in Turkey Göçeri (Turkey Aegean)
- Coordinates: 39°16′15″N 30°16′44″E
- Country: Turkey
- Province: Kütahya
- District: Kütahya
- Population (2022): 105
- Time zone: UTC+3 (TRT)

Göçeri is a village in Kütahya District of Kütahya Province, Turkey. As of 2022, its population is 105.

About 200 m northwest of the village is an isolated rocky outcrop known as Göçeri Kale. It seems to have been inhabited as early as the Phrygian period. There are remains of a rectangular cistern on the edge of the rocky plateau on top of the outcrop, and there are also several old cave dwellings on the outcrop's side. The biggest of these was decorated with geometric and plant reliefs and was connected to the plateau area by a staircase.
