= Altıntaş District =

District of Kütahya Province, Turkey

- District
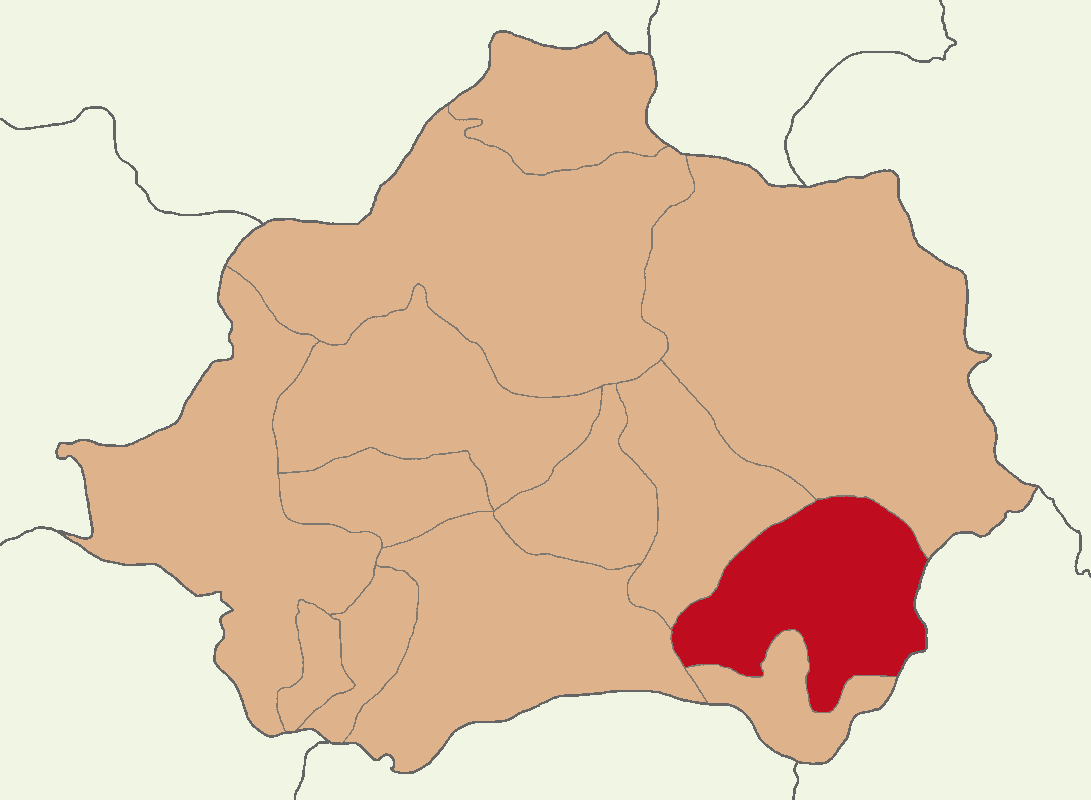
- Map showing Altıntaş District in Kütahya Province

- Location in Turkey Altıntaş District (Turkey Aegean)
- Coordinates: 39°04′N 30°07′E
- Country: Turkey
- Province: Kütahya
- Seat: Altıntaş

Government
  - Kaymakam: Hüseyin Bozoğlan
- Area: 941 km^{2} (363 sq mi)
- Population (2022): 15,018
  - Density: 16/km^{2} (41/sq mi)
- Time zone: UTC+3 (TRT)
- Website: www.altintas.gov.tr

Altıntaş District is a district of the Kütahya Province of Turkey. Its seat is the town of Altıntaş. Its area is 941 km^{2}, and its population is 15,018 (2022).

== Composition ==
There is one municipality in Altıntaş District:

- Altıntaş

There are 35 villages in Altıntaş District:

- Akçaköy
- Alibey
- Alıncık
- Altıntaş
- Aydınlar
- Aykırıkçı
- Beşkarış
- Çakırsaz
- Çayırbaşı
- Erenköy
- Eymir
- Gecek
- Genişler
- Gökçeler
- Işıklar
- Karaağaç
- Kuyucak
- Mecidiye
- Murathanlar
- Osmaniye
- Oysu
- Pınarcık
- Pusan
- Sadıkkırı
- Şanlıyurt
- Saraycık
- Sevdiğin
- Üçhüyük
- Yalnızsaray
- Yapılcan
- Yayla
- Yenikaraağaç
- Yeşilyurt
- Yolçatı
- Zafertepeçalköy
