= Döğer, İhsaniye =

Döğer
- Municipality
- Location in Turkey Döğer (Turkey Aegean)
- Coordinates: 39.1283°N 30.3942°E
- Country: Turkey
- Province: Afyonkarahisar
- District: İhsaniye
- Population (2021): 5,559
- Time zone: UTC+3 (TRT)

Döğer is a town (belde) and municipality in the İhsaniye District, Afyonkarahisar Province, Turkey. Its population is 5,559 (2021).

About 5.5 km (3.4 mi) northeast of the town, there are Urumkuş Rocks (Turkish: Urumkuş Kayalıkları), which were used as rock-cut dwellings and sacred places during the Phrygian and Byzantine period.
