= Kütahya District =

District of Kütahya Province, Turkey

- District
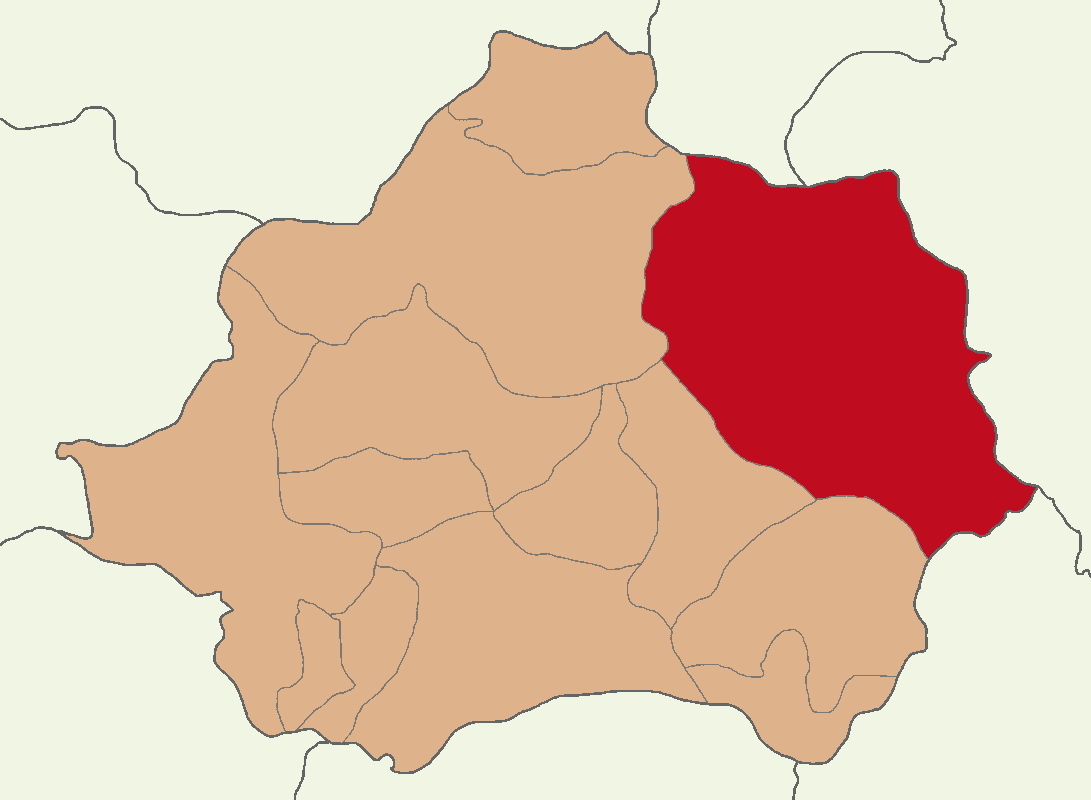
- Map showing Kütahya District in Kütahya Province

- Location in Turkey Kütahya District (Turkey Aegean)
- Coordinates: 39°25′N 29°59′E
- Country: Turkey
- Province: Kütahya
- Seat: Kütahya
- Area: 2,470 km^{2} (950 sq mi)
- Population (2022): 282,243
  - Density: 110/km^{2} (300/sq mi)
- Time zone: UTC+3 (TRT)

Kütahya District (also: Merkez, meaning "central" in Turkish) is a district of the Kütahya Province of Turkey. Its seat is the city of Kütahya. Its area is 2,470 km^{2}, and its population is 282,243 (2022).

== Composition ==
There are two municipalities in Kütahya District:

- Kütahya
- Seyitömer

There are 109 villages in Kütahya District:

- Ağaçköy
- Ağızören
- Ahiler
- Ahmetoluğu
- Akçamescit
- Akoluk
- Akpınar
- Aloğlu
- Anasultan
- Arslanlı
- Ayvalı
- Başören
- Bayat
- Bayramşah
- Belkavak
- Büyüksaka
- Çavuşçiftliği
- Çayca
- Çifteoluklar
- Çobanlar
- Çöğürler
- Çubukiçi
- Damlalıkaraağaç
- Darıca
- Dedik
- Demirciören
- Demirözü
- Dereköy
- Doğa
- Doğalar
- Doğarslan
- Doğluşah
- Elmacık
- Elmalı
- Eskiyüreğil
- Eynegazi
- Fındıkköy
- Fincanburnu
- Gedikoğluçiftliği
- Gelinkaya
- Göçeri
- Göynükören
- Güllüdere
- Gümüşköy
- Güvem
- Hamidiyekızılcaören
- Haymana
- İhsaniye
- İncik
- İnli
- İshakçılar
- Işıkkara
- Karaağaç
- Karacaören
- Karaöz
- Karsak
- Kaynarca
- Kepez
- Kınık
- Kıranşeyh
- Kirazlıyaylası
- Kireççiftliği
- Kızık
- Kızılcakaya
- Kızılcaören
- Koçak
- Köprüören
- Körpe
- Körs
- Kozluca
- Kumluyurt
- Kuyusinir
- Kükürt
- Lütfiye
- Mahmudiye
- Makasalanı
- Muhatboğazı
- Mustafalar
- Nusretköy
- Ortaca
- Ovacık
- Pullar
- Sabuncupınar
- Sağırlar
- Sakaçiftliği
- Sekiören
- Seydiköy
- Sırören
- Sobran
- Sofca
- Soğukçeşme
- Söğüt
- Söğütyaylası
- Sökmen
- Sulu
- Sünnetyenice
- Tepeköy
- Teşvikiye
- Turgutlar
- Uluköy
- Ürünlüçiftliği
- Yakaca
- Yaylababa
- Yazlıca
- Yenice
- Yenikaracaören
- Yenikızılcaören
- Yeşilbayır
- Yumaklı
