= Urumkuş Rocks =

Natural tuff rock formation in Turkey

Urumkyş Rocks
- Urumkuş Kayalıkları
- Location of Urumkuş Rocks in Turkey
- 39.29286°N 30.48762°E
- Type: Tuff rock-cut dwellings and sacred places
- Cultures: Phrygşan and Byzantine period
- Location: Döğer, İhsaniye, Afyonkarahisar
- Region: Aegean

Site notes
- Material: Tuff rock

Urumkuş Rocks (Turkish: Urumkuş Kayalıkları) are natural tuff rock formations located in Afyonkarahisar Province, western Turkey, which were used historically as dwelling and sanctuary.

Urumkuş Rocks are situdated in the Alanlı area, 5.5 km (3.4 mi) northeast at Döğer town in İhsaniye District of Afyonkarahisar Province.

The rock formation has quite steep sides. There are rock-cut dwellings and a chapel on one of the two large cliffs. On the other rock, there are only burial chambers. At the entrances of the burial chambers, reliefs as well as figures made with madder are found that belong to the Byzantine period. There are traces of foundations carved into the rock, niches, sacrificial pools, rock altars and cairns on the top and sides of the rock. This shows that the rock was used as a sanctuary and perhaps a residential area during the Phrygian period.
