= Seydiler, İscehisar =

Seydiler
- Municipality
- Location in Turkey Seydiler (Turkey Aegean)
- Coordinates: 38.8828°N 30.8331°E
- Country: Turkey
- Province: Afyonkarahisar
- District: İhsaniye
- Population (2021): 2,135
- Time zone: UTC+3 (TRT)

Seydiler is a town (belde) and municipality in the İscehisar District, Afyonkarahisar Province, Turkey. Its population is 2,135 (2021).
