= Fındıkköy, Kütahya =

Fındıkköy Fındık
- Village
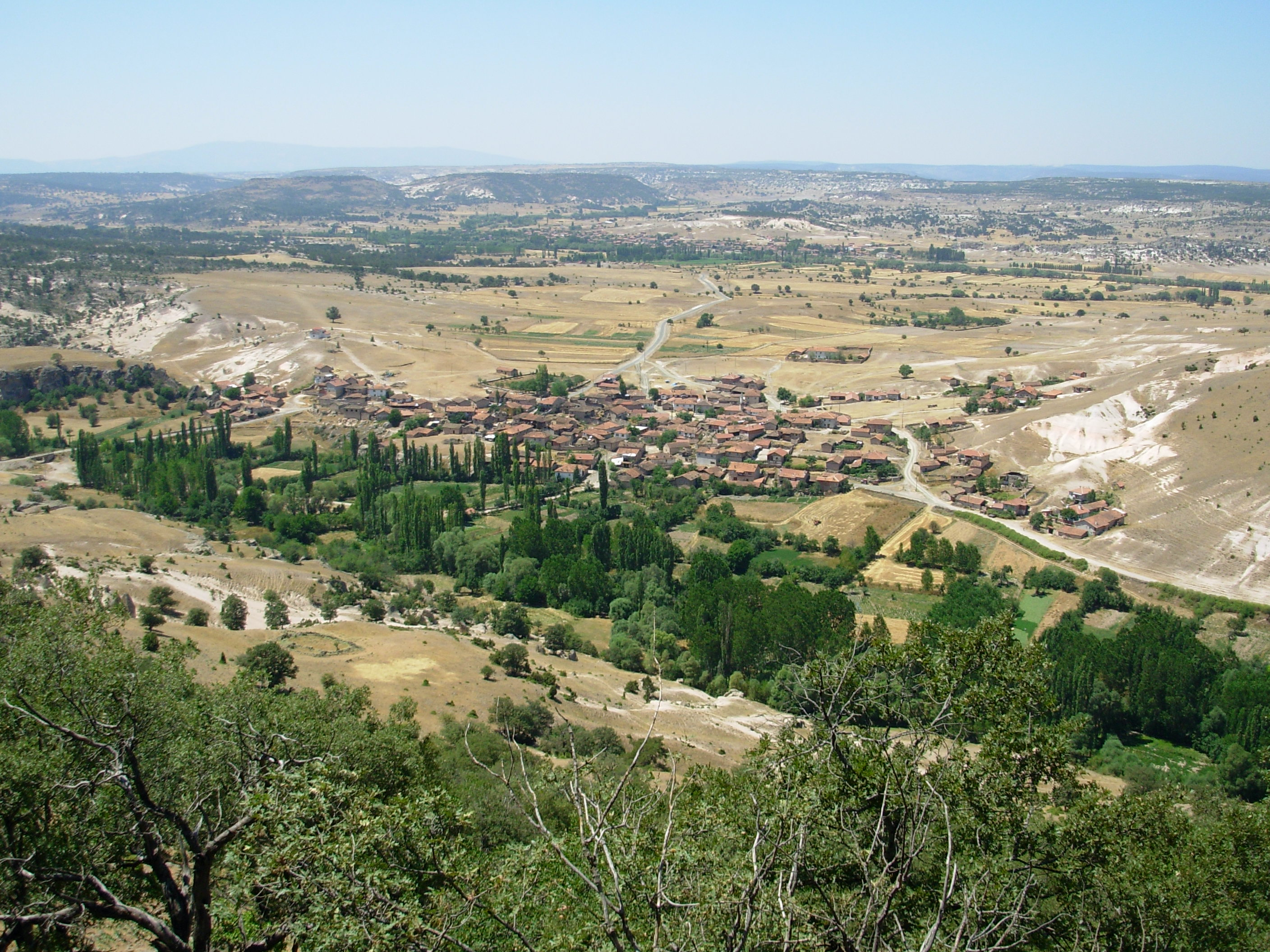

- Location within Turkey Location within Turkey Aegean
- Coordinates: 39.5645°N 30.2118°E
- Country: Turkey
- Province: Kütahya
- District: Kütahya
- Elevation: 940 m (3,080 ft)
- Population (2022): 132
- Time zone: UTC+3 (TRT)
- Postal code: 43270
- Area code: 0274

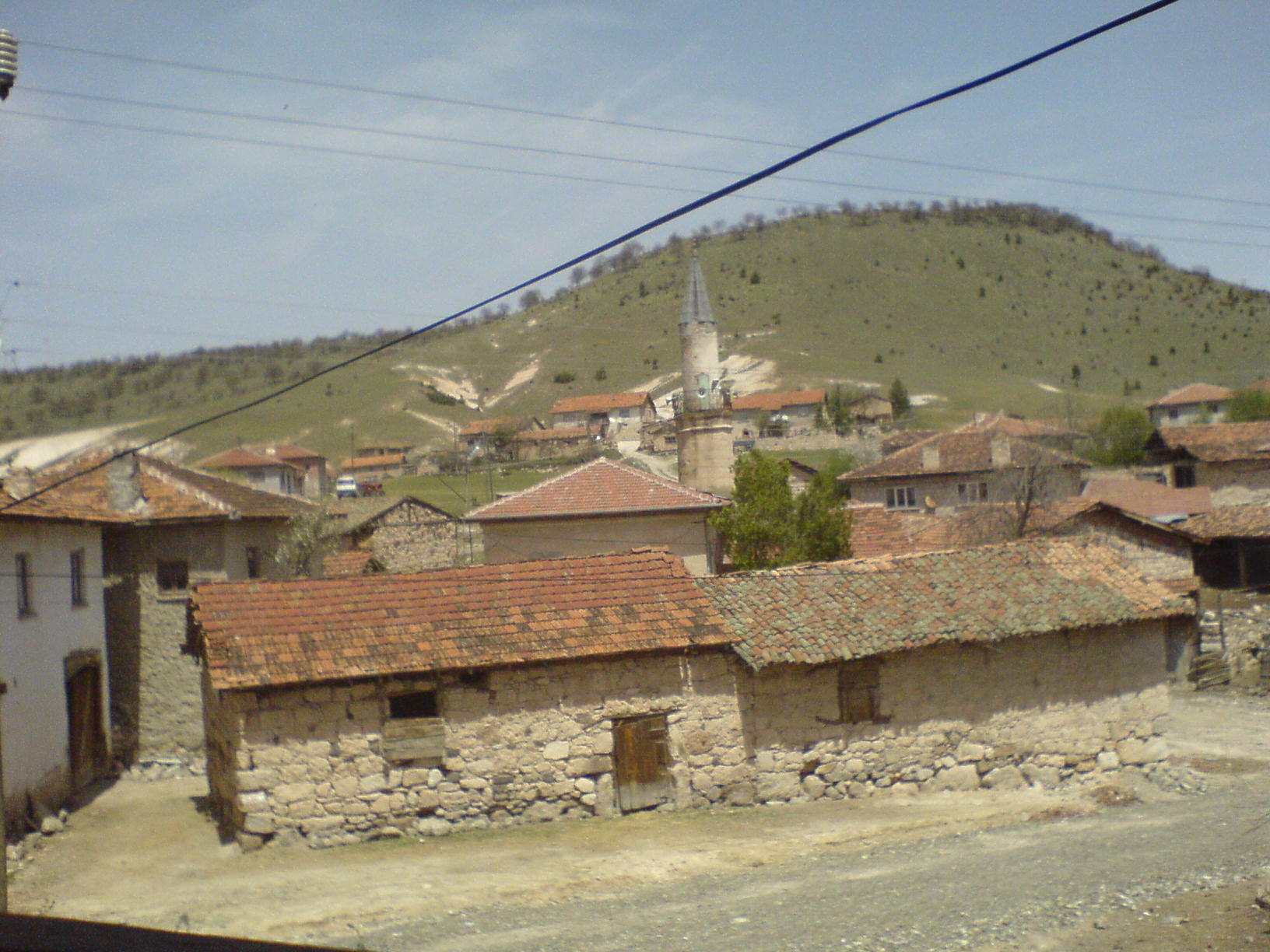
Houses in the village

Fındıkköy, also known as Fındık, is a village in the Kütahya District of Kütahya Province, Turkey. Its population is 132 (2022).

== Population ==
Historical population
Year	Pop.	±% p.a.
2007	121	—
2012	114	−1.18%
2017	112	−0.35%
2022	132	+3.34%
Source: TÜIK (2007-2022)
