= Aslantaş-Yılantaş =

Monument in Afyonkarahisar, Turkey

Alantaş-Yılantaş
- Interactive map of Alantaş-Yılantaş
- Location: İhsaniye, Afyonkarahisar, Turkey
- Coordinates: 39°02′53.6″N 30°31′27.5″E
- Material: Rock
- Dedicated to: Phrygian nobles

Aslantaş and Yılantaş are two Phrygian monumental rock-cut tombs located in the "Phrygian Valley" in the İhsaniye District of Afyonkarahisar Province, western Turkey. They are thought to belong to noble people. The site is 11 km (6.8 mi) east of İhsaniye town and 30 km (19 mi) north of Afyonkarahisar next to the Eskişehir-Afyonkarahisar highway D-665.

== Aslantaş ==
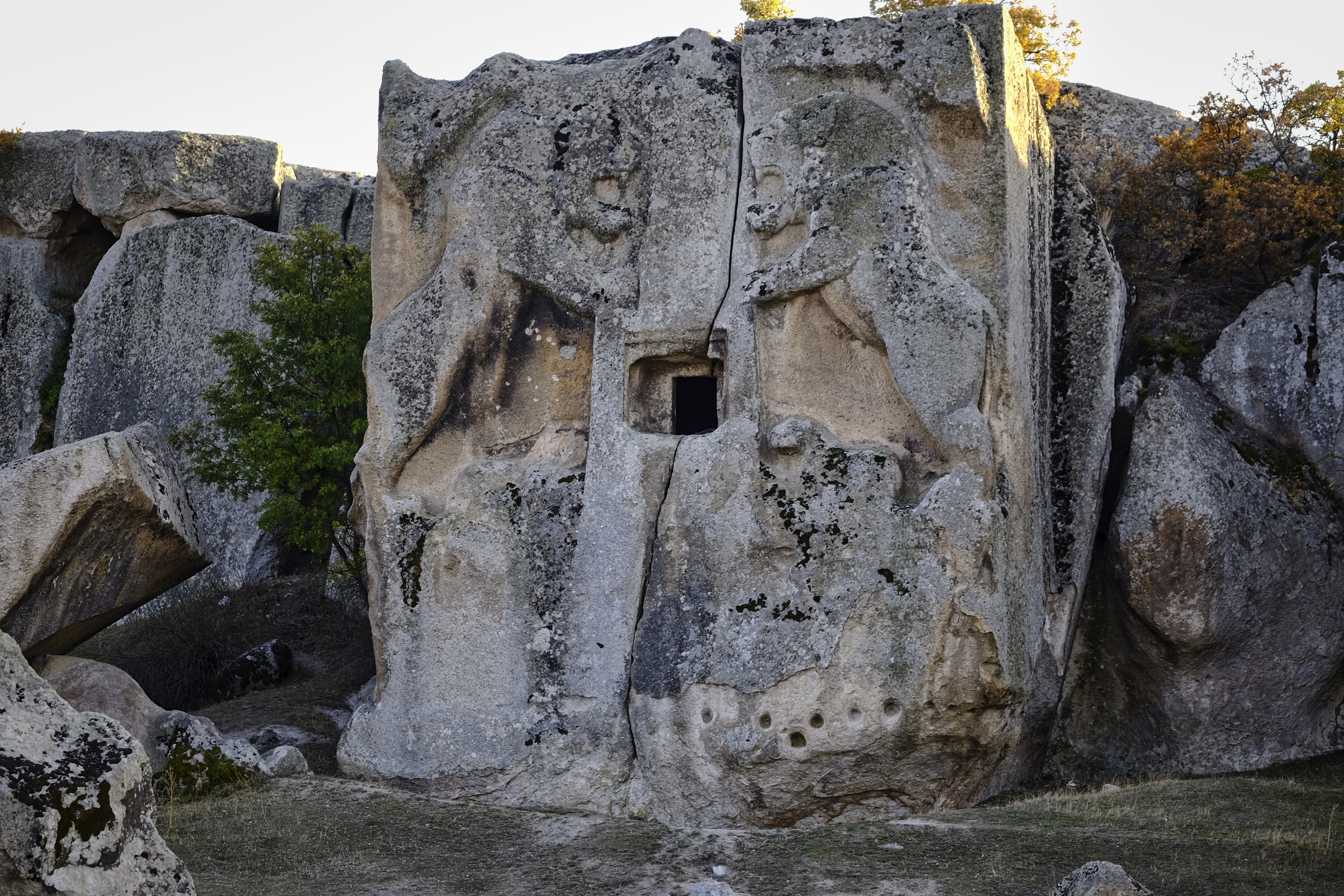
Aslantaş rock-cut tomb

Aslantaş (literally: "Lionstone") takes its name from the lion reliefs on the front of the tomb. The 11 m (36 ft)-high monolith is flattened on both sides and the facade. The reliefs on the tomb's facade flanking the entrance depict two rearing lions facing each other with a highly eroded lion cub between their legs. The upper part of the rock has steps, and above of the entrance is decorated with a mass resembling the tree of life with two winged sun discs on both sides. The tomb is dated to a period of the early 8th century BC or the late 7th century BC, although it is usually a late feature due to the highly ornate facade, small entrance, light-vaulted flat ceiling, and bedless burial chamber.

== Yılantaş ==
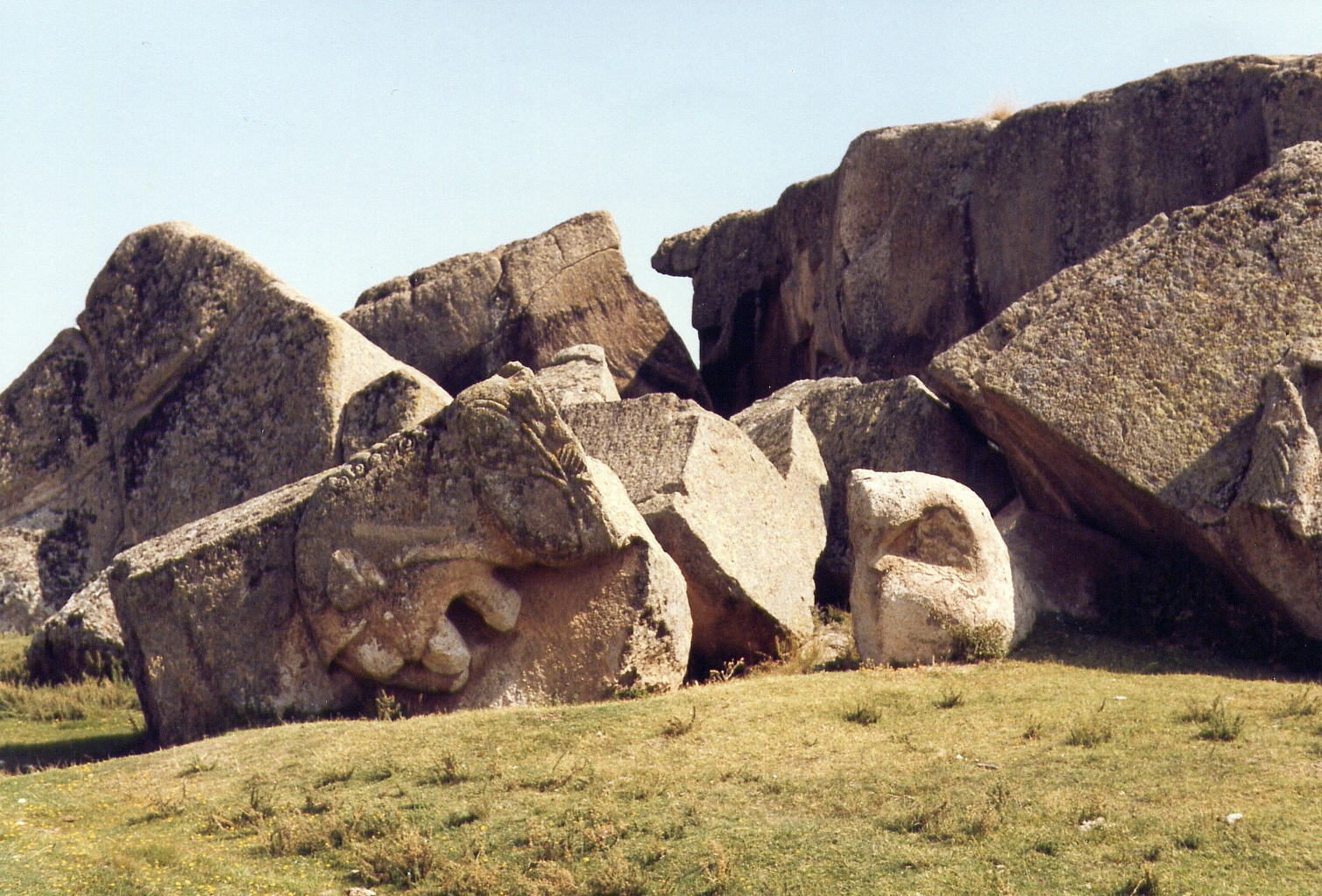
Yılantaş rock-cut tomb

The Yılantaş rock-cut tomb is located nearly 70 m (230 ft) west of the Aslantaş tomb. It was larger and more magnificent than Aslantaş, but the rock, on which it was found, is broken apart, probably by an earthquake or another natural disaster. The claws of two lions touching each other appear on one of the fragments of lion reliefs carved into the outer surface of the rock. The rock was called by the locals Yılantaş (literally: "Snakestone") because the eroded claw figures were wrongly believed to be snake heads. The rear and left side walls of the destroyed burial chamber are still visible on the bedrock. The right side wall with large lion reliefs on the outer surface and the north-facing tomb entrance as well as the front face were demolished. There is only one burial chamber. On pitched roofs, rafters were also carved in relief. There are two klinai in front of the back wall, one on the right side wall. There is also a small third on the right wall near the entrance. However, the two klinai are more likely to be seats due to the size and leg ornamentation that differ from the other ones. The triangular form of the inclined roof can be seen on the back wall of the rock. In front of the left side is a narrow, high podium with a short column at each end. The outer face of the tomb entrance is flanked with reliefs of two warriors wearing helmets, which look like they are guarding the entrance with their spears and shields. Among the warriors, at the top of the gate, is a Gorgon's head (a mythological creature with snake-like serpentine locks of hair). Although Dutch archaeologist C. H. E. Haspels (1894–1980) dates it to around the 6th century BC, it may be dated to a later period due to its unique features.
