= Kütahya Province =

Province of Turkey

Coordinates: 39°18′17″N 29°35′24″E

Kütahya Province Kütahya ili
- Province
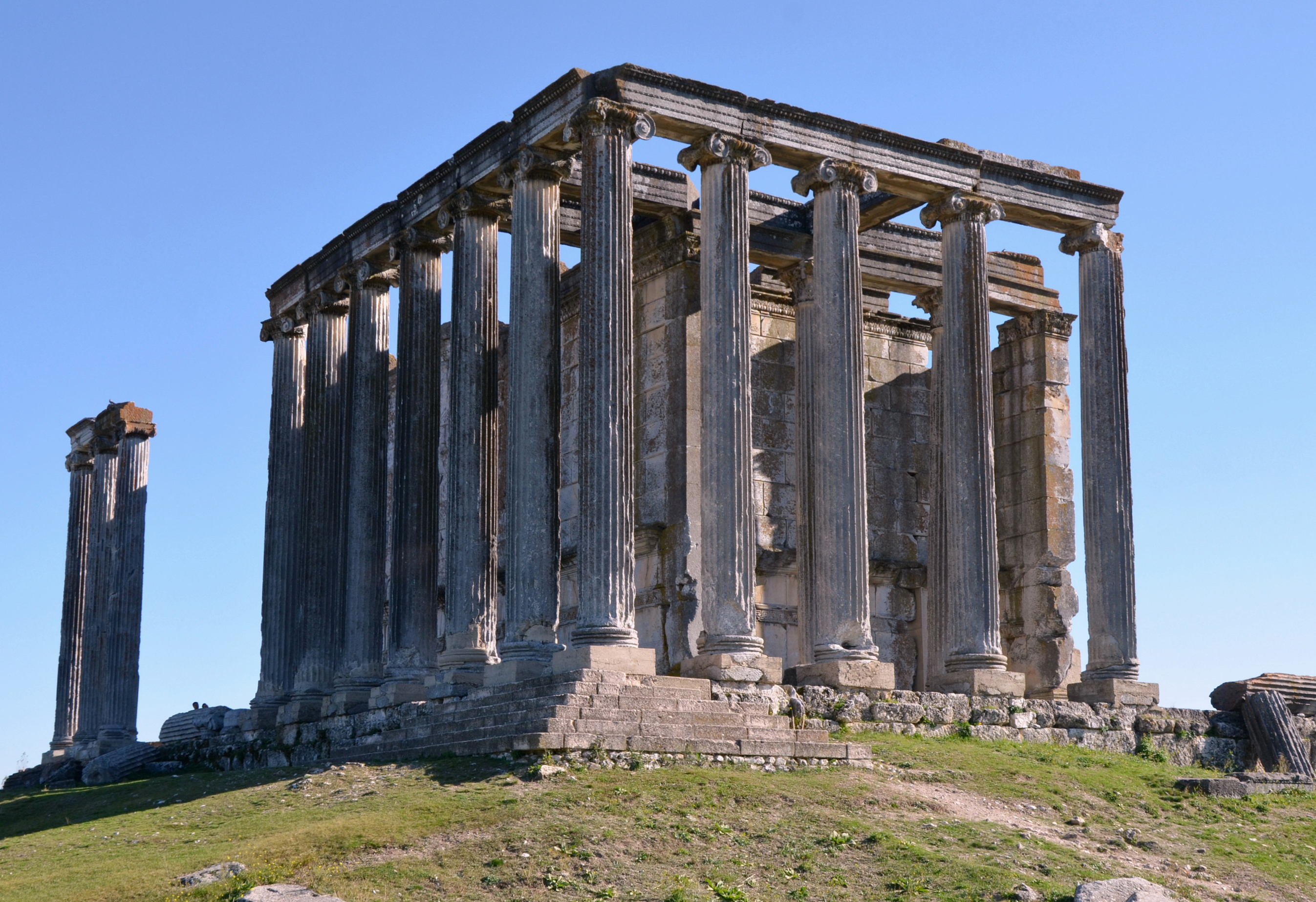
- Temple of Zeus in ancient city of Aizanoi

- Location of the province within Turkey
- Country: Turkey
- Seat: Kütahya

Government
  - Governor: Musa Işın
- Area: 11,634 km^{2} (4,492 sq mi)
- Population (2022): 580,701
  - Density: 49.914/km^{2} (129.28/sq mi)
- Time zone: UTC+3 (TRT)
- Area code: 0274
- Website: www.kutahya.gov.tr

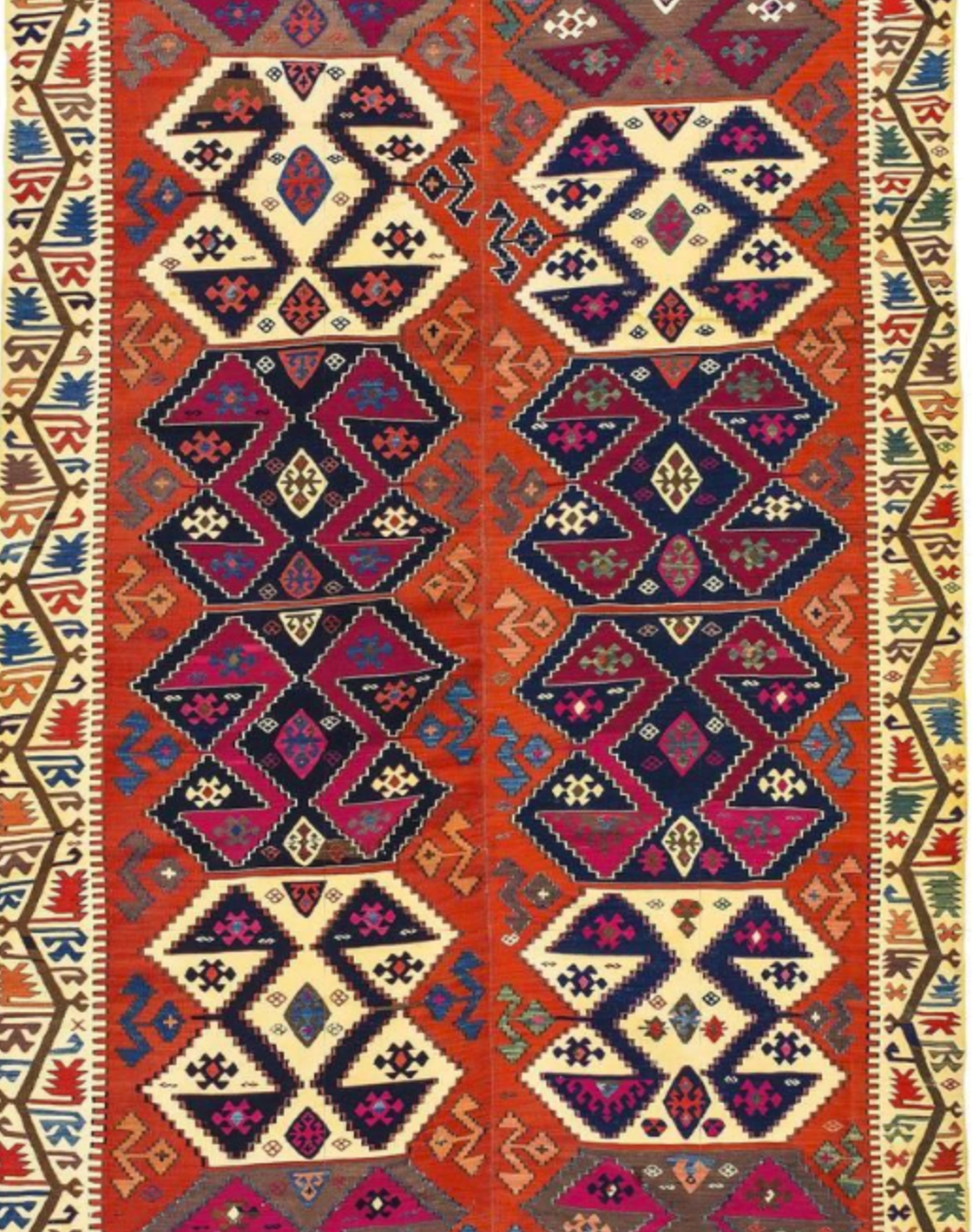
Kütahya kilim (detail), circa 1875

Kütahya Province (Turkish: Kütahya ili) is a province in the Aegean region of Turkey. Its area is 11,634 km^{2}, and its population is 580,701 (2022). In 1990, Kütahya had a population of 578,000.

The neighboring provinces are Bursa to the northwest, Bilecik to the northeast, Eskişehir to the east, Afyon to the southeast, Usak to the south, Manisa to the southwest and Balıkesir to the west.

The capital city of the province is Kütahya.

== History ==
=== Early Bronze ===
Kütahya’s history extends as far back to the years 3000 BC, although the specific date of its establishment is unknown. According to old sources, Kütahya’s name during the ancient eras was recorded as Kotiaeon, Cotiaeum and Koti.

=== Late Bronze ===
During the Late Bronze, this region eventually became dominated by the Hittite Empire (c. 1320 BC).

=== Iron Age ===
The Phrygians are the oldest group of people to have settled in the province’s lands. The Phrygians, who came to Anatolia in 1200s BC, entered the Kingdom of Hittite’s lands and organized themselves into a government.

In 676 BC, by defeating the Phrygian King Midas III, the Cimmerians took control of Kütahya and its surroundings.

During the time when Alyattes was the king of Lydia, the Lydians took over the Cimmerian’s rule. In 546 BC, the Persians defeated the Lydian army and invaded Anatolia. After defeating the Persians near Biga Stream in 334 BC, Alexander of Macedonia established domination over the region. Kütahya and its regions passed on to Alexander’s general Antigonos after his death in 323 BC. In 133 BC, it joined under the Roman Empire’s governance. It was then made an episcopal center.

In 1078, the founder of the Seljuk Sultanate of Rum Suleyman ibn Qutalmish captured Kütahya. It was attacked by the Crusaders in 1097. Kilij Arslan II re-captured Kütahya along with other lost lands. The city was lost again to the Byzantines due to fights over the throne after Kilij Arslan II’s death. During Aladdin Kayqubad I’s rule, it became part of the Seljuk’s territories. In 1277, Giyaseddin Kaykhusrev II of the Germiyanids gave his daughter Devlet Hatun’s hand in marriage to the Ottoman Sultan Murad I’s son Yildirim Bayezid. As part of her dowry, Kütahya and its surroundings were also given to the Ottomans. However, in 1402 Bayezid was defeated by Timur at the Battle of Ankara and lost Kütahya to Timur. Timur gave the province to back to Yakup Bey II of the Germiyanids. Kütahya later joined the Ottoman Empire and became a sanjak (district) capital in 1429.

=== Nomadic Tribes of Kütahya ===
Based on historical records by geographer Ibn Said, there was a population of 30,000 nomads living in the area of Kütahya during the second half of the 13th century.

During the 16th century, the nomadic tribes tied to the Ottomans were the Akkeçili, Kılcan, Bozguş, Müselleman-ı Toplu, Akkoyunlu, Avşar, Kayı and Çobanlar. There were also several nomadic tribes who acted independently.

In 1571, the nomadic population in Kütahya had a total of 25,317 soldiers. In comparison, Kütahya’s settled population had 72,447 soldiers during the same year.

Although these were traditionally nomadic people, it is found that many transitioned between nomadic and settled life during the 16th century. This is similar to the general practice of move from nomadic to settled life among the tribes in Western Anatolia in this century. Even though these tribal populations settled, they were still referred to as “Yörüks” or nomads in documents. This is the case even in situations where it was clearly recorded that they have settled.

== Fine Porcelain and Ceramics ==
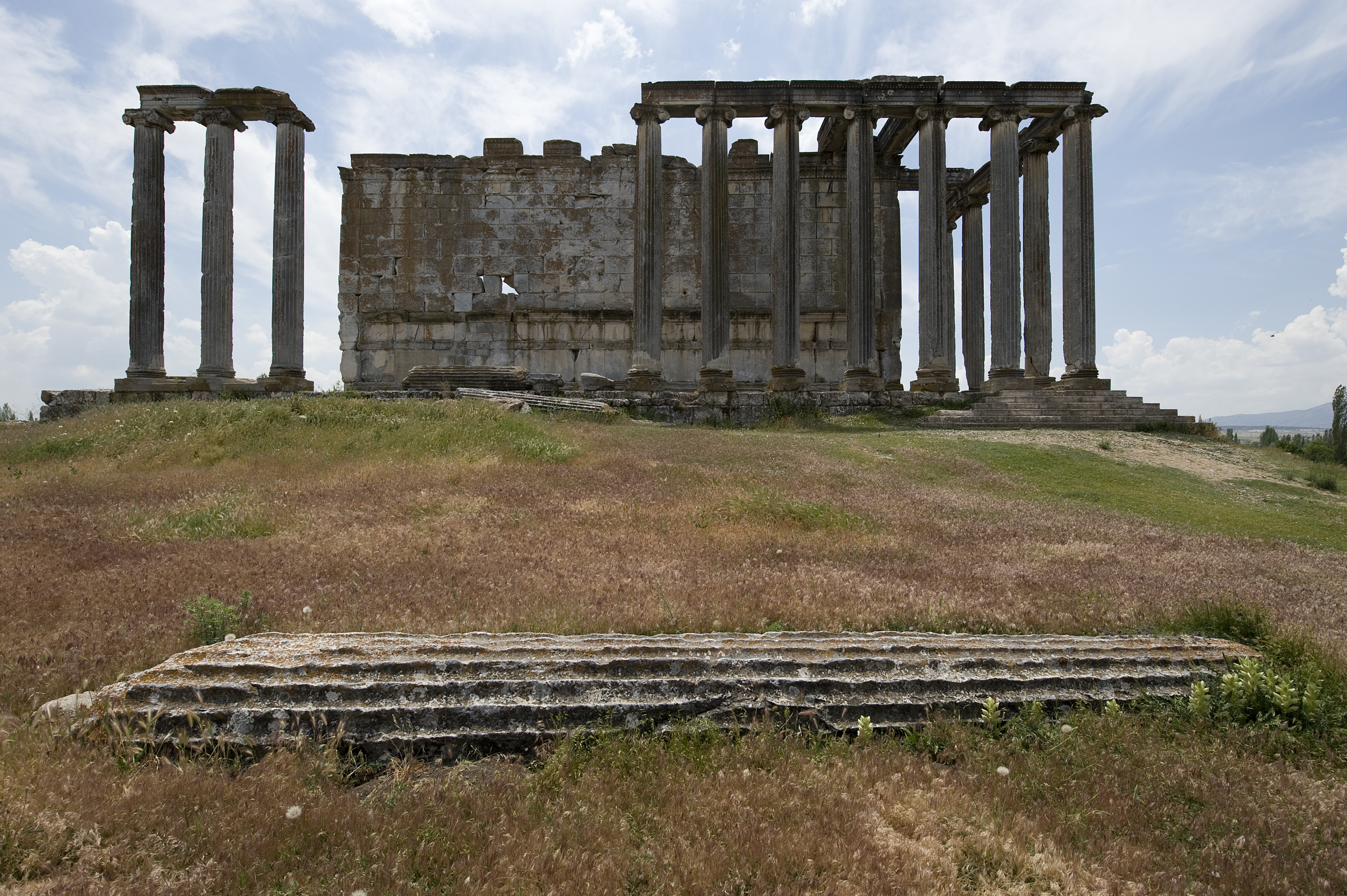
Temple of Zeus in ancient city of Aizanoi. Tourism is an important economic of the city.

=== Early history ===
Historians state that fine porcelain art began in Kütahya from the Chalcolithic Age (B.C. 5500-3000), which is also known as the Mineral-Stone Age. Due to the presence of rich clay deposits in its surroundings, the production of ceramics was also intense during the Phrygian, Hellenistic, Roman and Byzantine periods. This art form is still traditionally practiced in present day.

=== Fine Porcelain Production during the Ottoman Empire ===
In the Ottoman period, Kütahya was the second production center for fine porcelain after Iznik. While the first fine porcelain samples started to be seen in Kütahya at the end of the 14th century, the real progress started after the second half of the 16th century when Iznik was at the peak of fine porcelain art. Fine porcelain ateliers were established in Kütahya specifically to meet Istanbul’s fine porcelain needs. During this period, in addition to the decline of the Ottoman Empire, fine porcelain making in Iznik began to decline at the same pace. With the disappearance of fine porcelain art in Iznik during the 18th century, Kütahya became the only place operating in this field. The most recent examples of fine porcelain from the Ottoman Empire was produced by Hafız Mehmed Emin Efendi, a fine porcelain master from Kütahya who made great contributions to the development of fine porcelain art.

== Food culture and cuisine ==
A large portion of Kütahya’s nutrition and food culture is based on home goods, with wheat products, dough products, and dairy products forming the foundation of the local diet. The most consumed foods in the region are erişte, a type of homemade pasta, bulgur and tarhana, especially kızılcık tarhanası. Bulgur and tarhana hold a prominent place in the local cuisine as they are products that are consumed on a daily basis. Dough goods also make up a large part of Kütahya’s cuisine. For instance, well-known local dishes of Kütahya are cimcik, a type of pasta, haşhaşlı pide, şibit and gözleme.

Kütahya’s food culture was predominantly based on home goods. The local population depended on what they produced at home and rarely bought from outside sellers, such as markets. However, this has changed in recent times as the population became more urbanized. Now, more and more people buy daily food necessities, such as bread, from the market or bakeries. Nevertheless, the population continues to practice staple food traditions. For instance, vegetables, such peppers, beans, and eggplants, are still harvested during the summer time and dried in preparation for the winter. Similarly, the local population continues to prepare food products that are consumed on a daily basis, such as tomato paste, erişte, tarhana, and pickles, at home."

== Districts ==
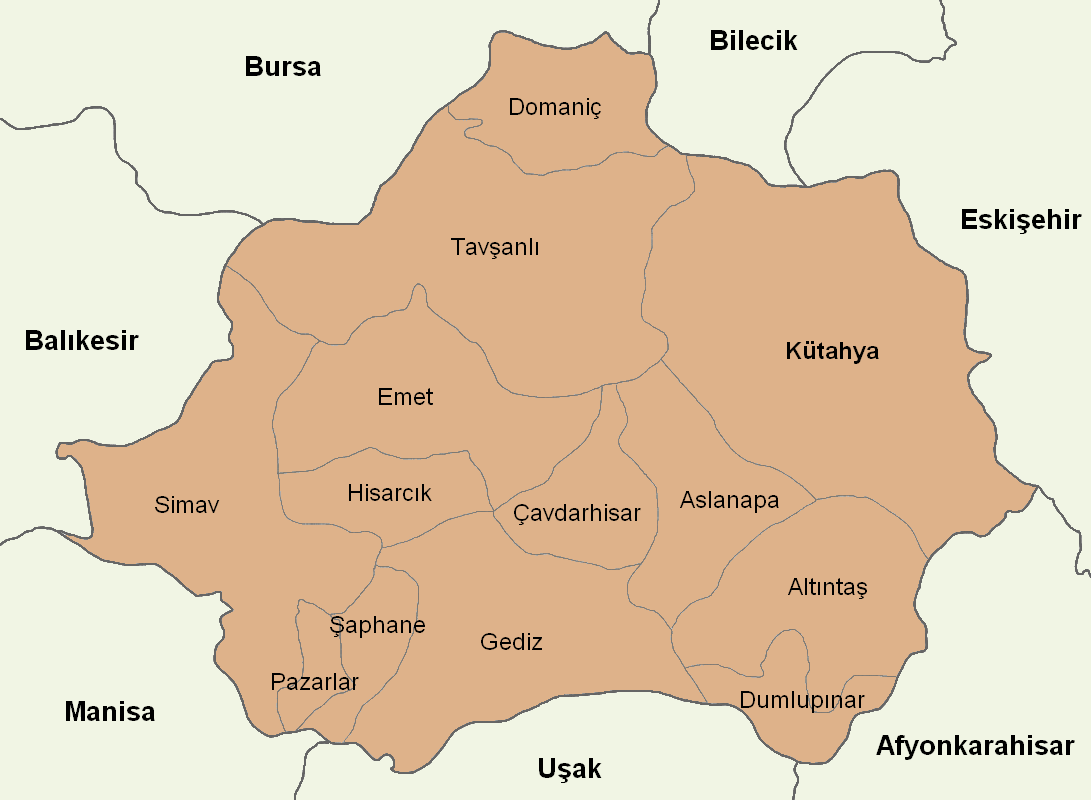

Kütahya province is divided into 13 districts (capital district in bold):

- Altıntaş
- Aslanapa
- Çavdarhisar
- Domaniç
- Dumlupınar
- Emet
- Gediz
- Hisarcık
- **Kütahya**
- Pazarlar
- Şaphane
- Simav
- Tavşanlı
