= List of rivers of Turkey =

Map of Turkey (and adjacent areas) with rivers

River basins of Turkey also showing where they extend into neighbouring countries

Rivers of Turkey can be divided into several groups depending on where they flow.

== Flow into the Black Sea ==
=== Europe ===
- Mutludere (also known as Rezovo) flows from Turkey into Bulgaria. 112 km
- Veleka flows into Bulgaria and then into the Black Sea. 147 km (25 km in Turkey)

=== Anatolia ===
Western

- Göksu Çayı (Classical Psilis ~ Papanios)
- Sakarya River (Classical Sangarius, Hittite Šaḫiriya) - the third longest river in Turkey at 824 km
  - Seydisuyu (or Seydi Çayı, Harami Çayı) - merges along the northern course (Classical Parthenius, one of several)
  - Göynük River (Göynük Çayı) - short left tributary running south (Classical Gallus)
  - Aladağı Çayı - right tributary going directly north (Classical Skopas)
  - Kirmir Çayı - right tributary going northeast (Classical Hieros, Siberis)
  - Ankara River - long right tributary running east
  - Porsuk River - long left tributary running southwest (Classical Tembris, Thymbres, Hittite Hulana)
- Büyük Melen Su (Classical Hypios)
  - Küçük Melen Su - tributary (Classical Kieros)
- Kocaman Dere (Classical Elaios)
- Alaplı Su (Classical Kales)
- Gürünç Su or Gülüç Su (Classical Lycus, one of several)
- Limanbaşi Deresi (Clasiscal Acheron ~ Soonautes)
- Ilık Su (possibly the Classical Oxinas ~ Kallichoros)
- Filyos River (Classical Billaeus)
  - Devrek River - tributary (Classical Ladon)
- Bartın River (Classical Parthenius, one of several)
- Kromna stream (Classical Meles)
- Abana Deresi (Classical Aiginetes)
- Kara Su (Classical Ocherainos, Ochosbanes, Ochthomanes)
- Kabalı Çayı (Classical Euarchos, Euechos]]

Eastern

- Kızılırmak 'Red River' (Classical Halys) is the longest river in Turkey, 1,350 km
  - Gök River (or Gökırmak) - tributary running west (Classical Amnias, Hittite Tahara)
  - Devrez River - tributary running southwest
  - Delice River - tributary running southeast (Classical Cappadox)
- Merd Irmağı (Classical Lykastos)
- Abdal Dere (Classical Chadisia)
- Yeşilırmak 'Green River' at 418 km (Classical Iris, Hittite Zuliya)
  - Kelkit River (Classical Lycus (one of several)) is a tributary
  - Çekerek River (Classical Scylax) is a tributary
- Terme River (Classical Thermōdōn)
- Miliçsuyu or Miliç Deresi (Classical Beris)
- Zindan Dere (Classical Thoaris)
- Yevis Dere (Classical Phigamous)
- Boloman Irmağı (Classical Sidenos)
- Çaka Dere (Classical Genetos)
- Melet Irmağı (Classical Melanthius)
- Bazar Suyu (Classical Pharmatenos)
- Yağlıdere
- Gelevara Deresi
- Harşit River in Gümüşhane and Giresun (Classical Philabonites, later Charsiotes)
  - Kılıçlar River
  - Tohumluk River
  - Üçköprü is not actually a river but the point where the Kılıçlar and Tohumluk meet
- Kireson Dere (Classical Kerasous)
- Kara Dere (Classical Hyssus or Hyssos)
- Istala Dere (Classical Ophis)
- Baltacı River (Classical Psychros, Psihos)
- İyidere Deresi or İkizdere Çay (Classical Kalopotamos, Kalos)
- Taşlı Dere (Classical Askouros)
- Kıbledağı Dere (Classical Adienos (Adineos))
- Pazar Dere (Classical Zagatis)
- Aksu Deresi in Giresun Province
- Batlama River in Giresun
- Fırtına River (Classical Prytanis, later Pordanis)
  - Değirmendere - tributary (Classical Pyxites)
- Çoruh River (Classical Acampsis on lower course, Boas ~ Harpasos on upper course)
  - Acharistsqali (Classical Apsaros, Apsyrtos, later Apsorrhus) - northernmost right tributary
  - Machakhlistskal(i) - right tributary
  - Berta Suyu - right tributary
  - Oltu (Classical Glaucus) - southernmost right tributary
  - Barhal - left tributary
  - Balakor - left tributary

== Flow into the Marmara Sea ==
- Biga Çayı, the classical Granicus
- Gönen Çay, the classical Aesepus
- Mustafakemalpaşa Çayı, the classical Rhyndacus
- Simav Çayı (or Susurluk Çayı, Çapraz Çayı), the classical Makestos
  - Manyas Çayı (or Kocaçay, Madra Deresi), the classical Tarsios

== Flow into the Aegean Sea ==
=== Europe ===
- Meriç (Maritsa or Evros) is in the European section of Turkey and has its source in Bulgaria. It is 480 km long.
  - Tunca is a 350 km tributary in Bulgaria
  - Ergene is a tributary inside of Turkey.

=== Anatolia ===
- Azmak Creek
- Bakırçay (Classical Caicus or Astraeus)
- Büyük Menderes River (Classical Maeander or Meander). 548 km
  - Lycus (river of Phrygia)
    - Cadmus (river)
- Cayster River or Küçük Menderes. 114 km
- Gediz River (Classical Hermus). 401 km
  - Pactolus (also known as Sart Çayı)
- Karamenderes River (Classical Scamander)

== Flow into the Mediterranean Sea ==
- Dalaman River (Classical Indus)
- Aksu (Classical Kestros)
- Manavgat River (Classical Melas)
- Köprüçay River (Classical Eurymedon)
- Dim River
- Kaledran Creek
- Dragon Creek (Turkey)
- Sini Creek
- Göksu (Classical Calycadnus)
- Limonlu Çayı (also known as Lamas; Classical Lamos)
- Alata River
- Tömük Creek
- Karacaoğlan River
- Tece Creek
- Mezitli River (Classical Liparis)
- Efrenk River (also known as Müftü)
- Deliçay
- Berdan River (also called Tarsus; Classical Cydnus)
- Seyhan River (Classical Sarus)
  - Zamantı River (Classical Karmalas, Byzantine Onopniktes)
- Ceyhan River (Classical Pyramus or Leucosyrus). 509 km
  - Harman Çayı
  - Göksun Çayı 115 km
- Payas River
- Deli Çay River
- Asi River (Classical Orontes)
  - Afrin River
    - Karasu

== Flow into the Persian Gulf ==
- Euphrates
  - Khabur River
    - Jaghjagh River
  - Sajur River
  - Karasu
  - Murat River
    - Kocasu Creek (Hınıs)
- Tigris
  - Great Zab (in Turkish Büyükzap Suyu)
  - Little Khabur
  - Botan River (Uluçay)
  - Batman River
  - Hezir River

== Flow into the Caspian Sea ==
- Kura River
  - Aras River
    - Arpaçay River (also known as Akhurian) is a tributary of the Aras. It arises in Armenia and forms part of the border between Armenia and Turkey before joining the Aras.

== Ancient ==
- Aegospotami
- Asopus
- Cales (river), modern Alaplı Su
- Hyllus (river)
- Lycus (river of Bithynia)
- Lycus (river of Cilicia)
- Lycus (river of Lydia)
- River Meles
- Pinarus River

== Gallery ==
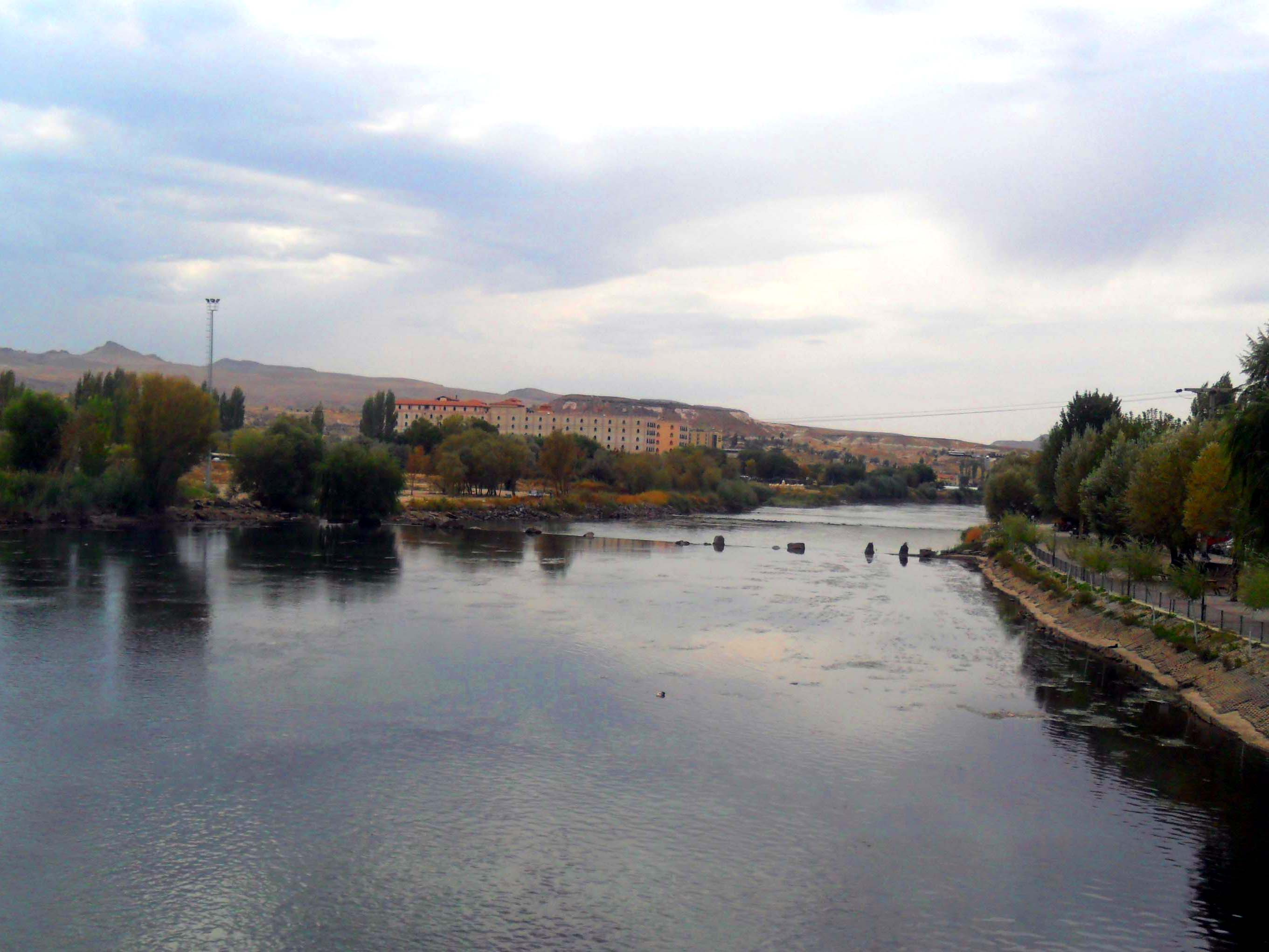
Kızılırmak
Nevşehir Province

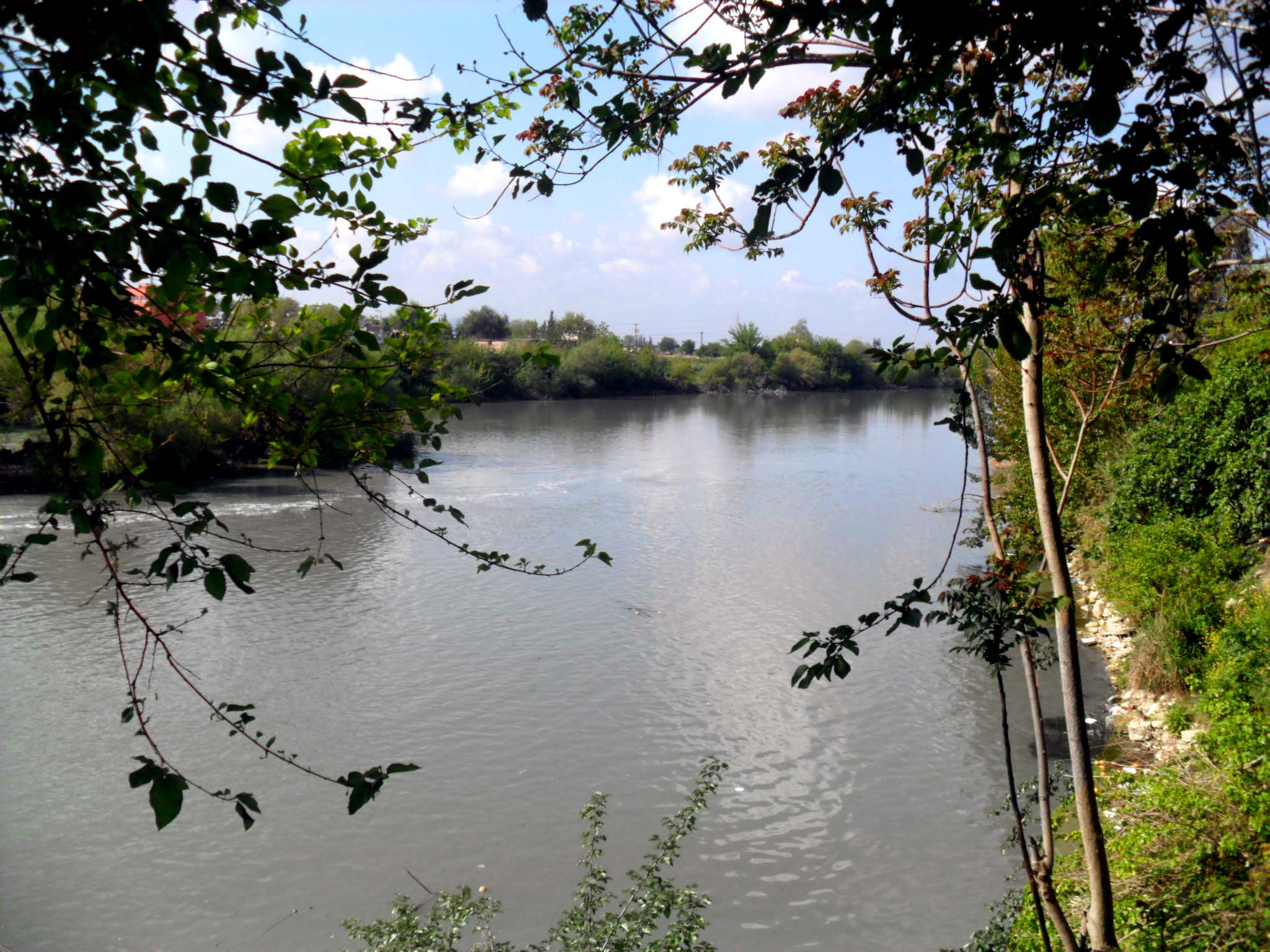
Ceyhan River
Adana Province

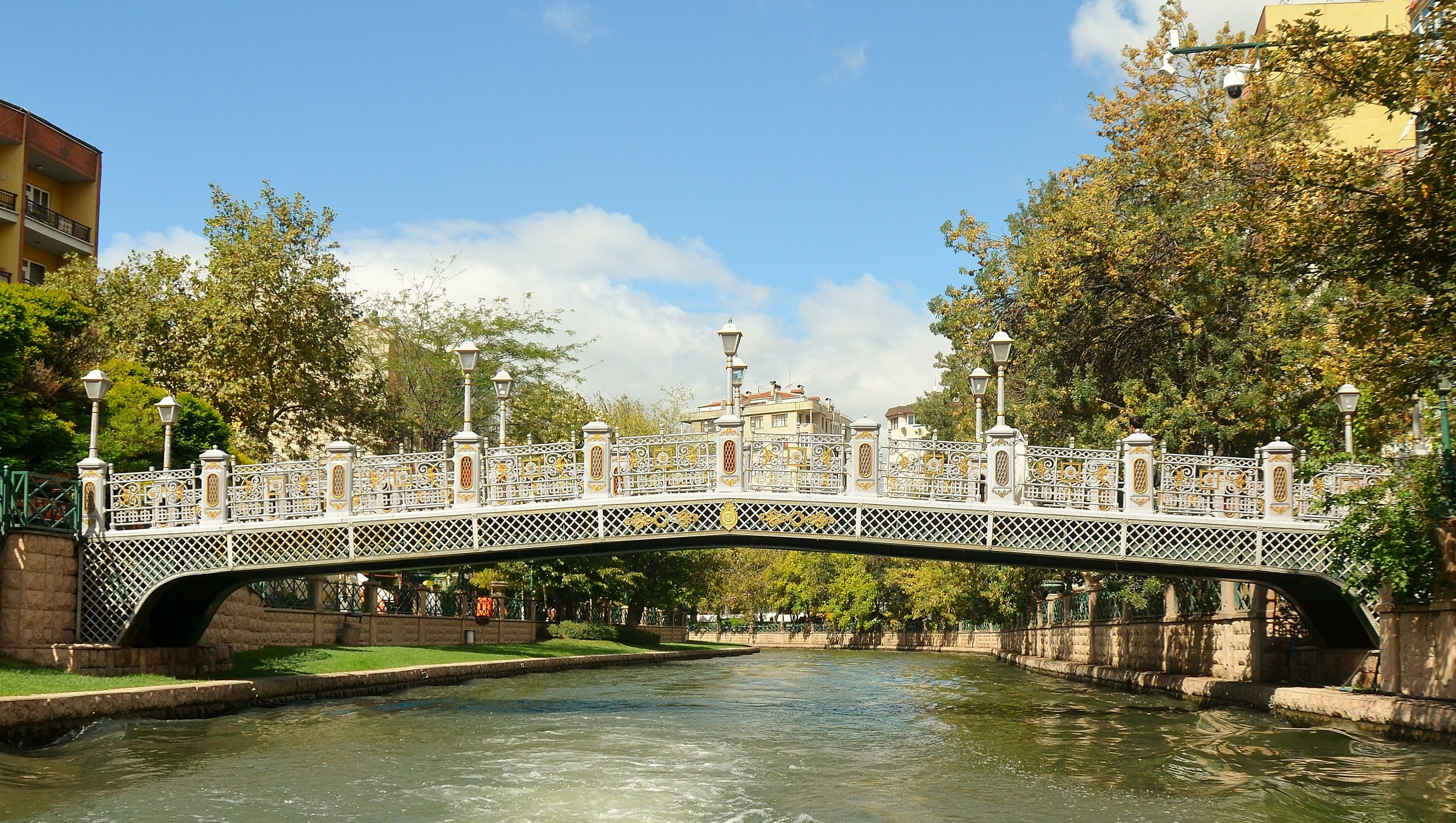
Porsuk River
Eskişehir Province

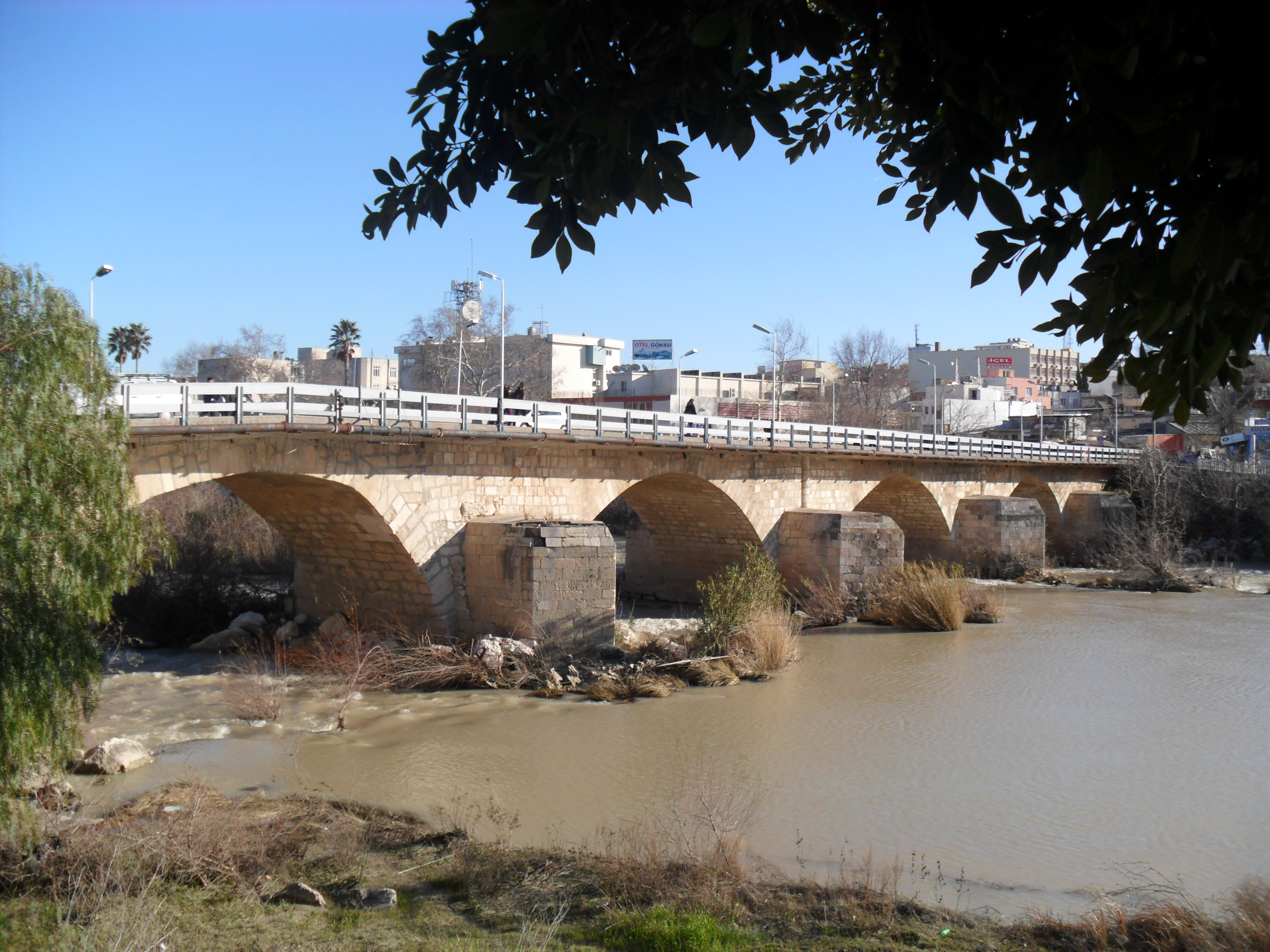
Göksu River
Mersin Province

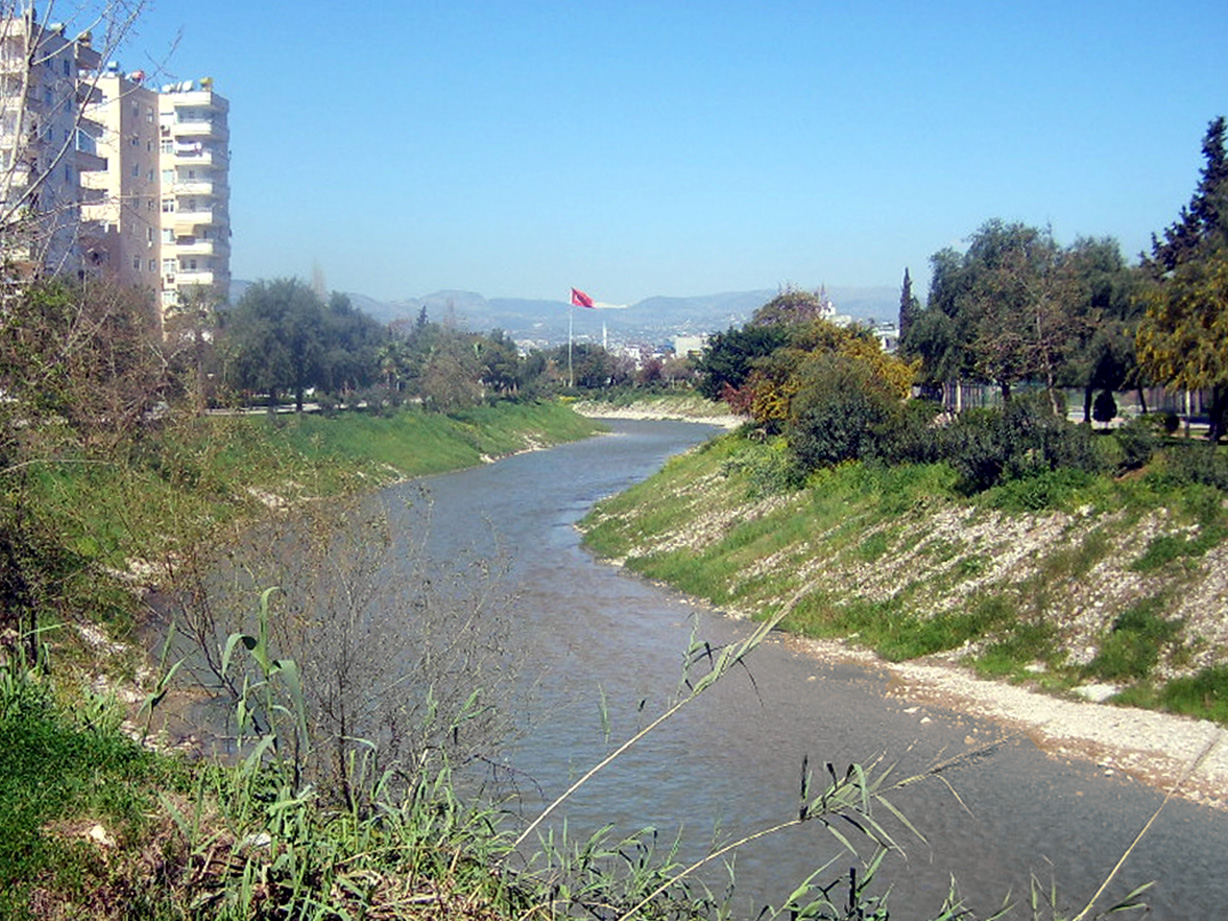
Müftü River
Mersin Province

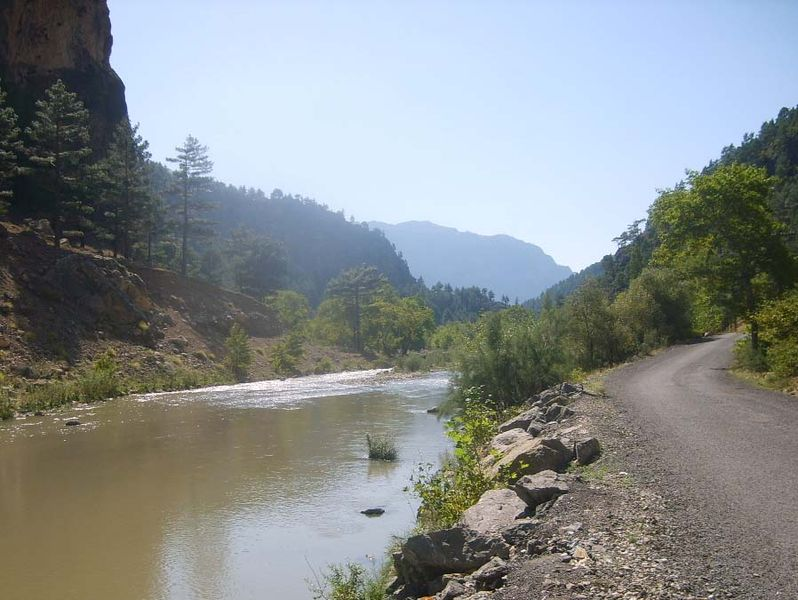
Seyhan River
Adana Province

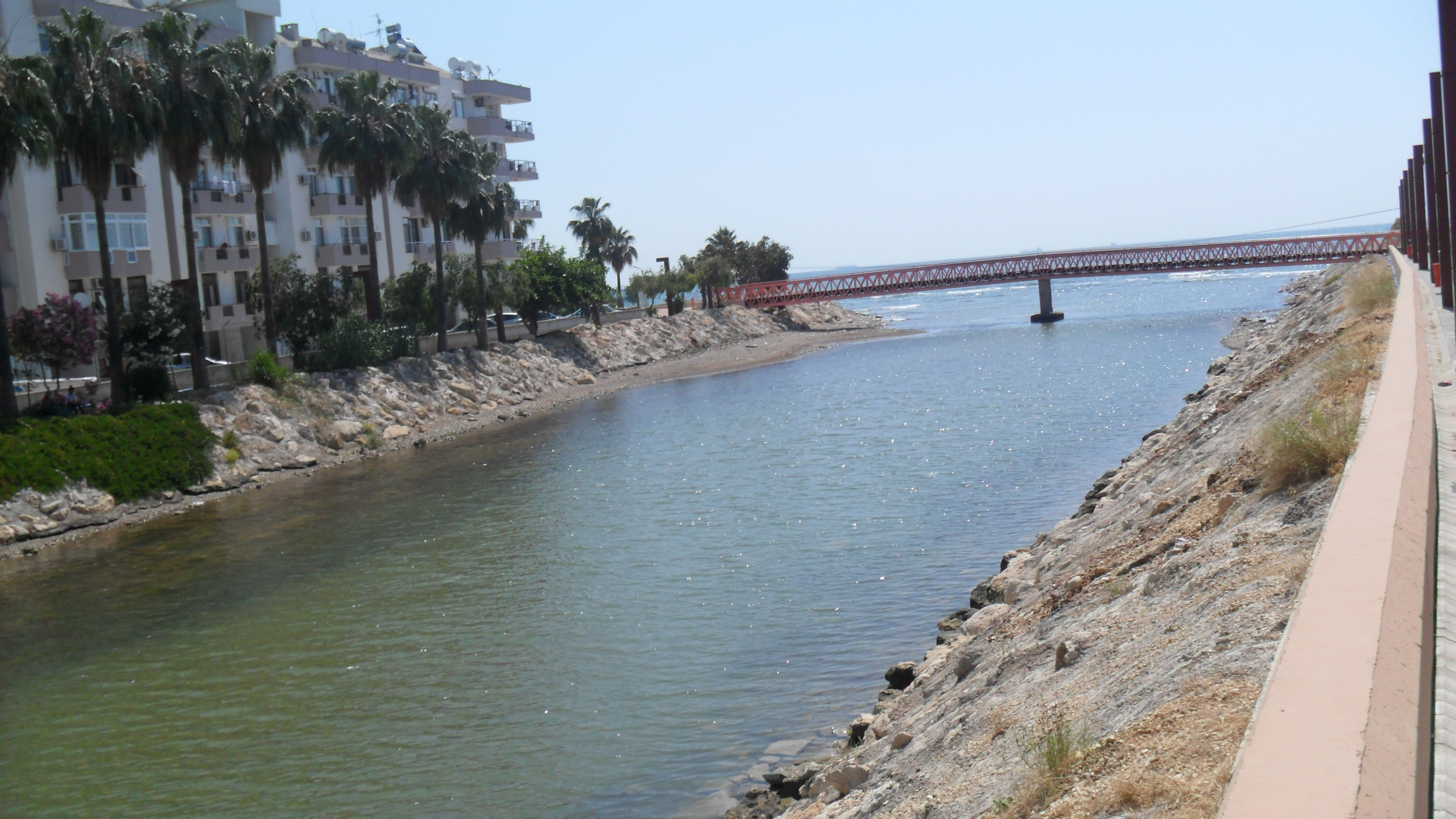
Mezitli River
Mersin Province

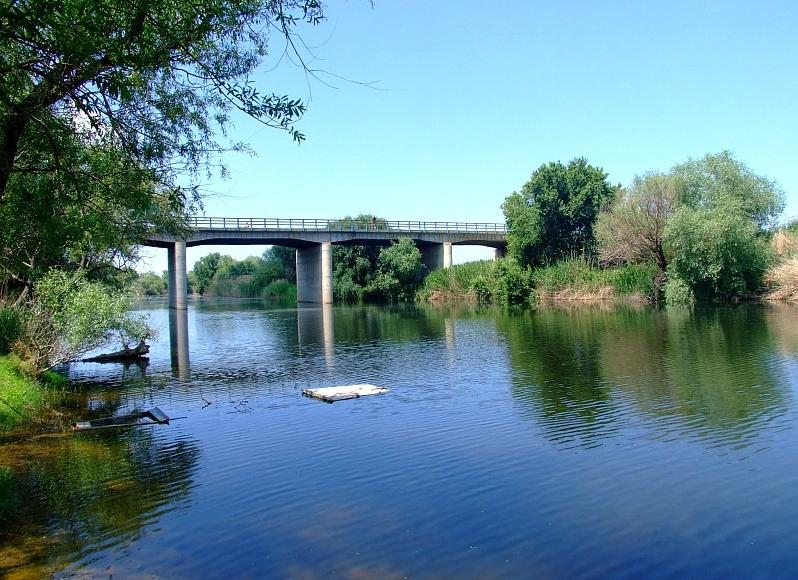
Gediz River
İzmir Province

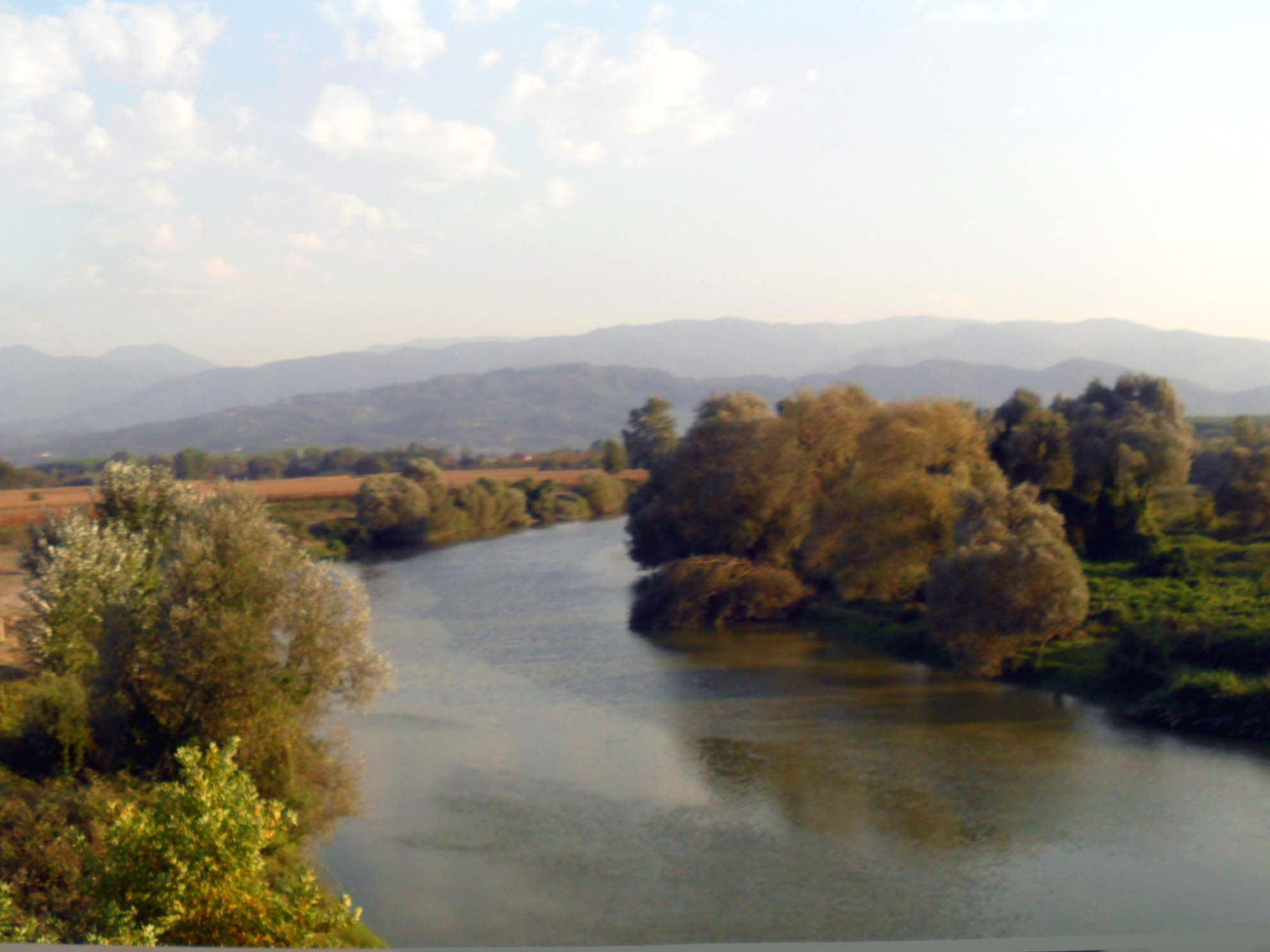
Sakarya River
Sakarya Province

== See also ==
- Geography of Turkey
- Regions of Turkey
- Lakes of Turkey
- Dams and reservoirs of Turkey
