= Lycus =

Lycus, Lykos or Lycos Ancient Greek: Λύκος, lit. 'wolf') may refer to:

== Mythological or fictional characters ==
- Lycus (mythology), various figures in Greek mythology
- Karl Lykos, a Marvel Comics villain also known as Sauron
- Lycus, a DC Comics villain and son of Ares (DC Comics)

== Rivers ==
- Lycos or Great Zab, a river of Assyria, located in modern-day Turkey and Iraq
- Lycus (river of Bithynia), which flows into the Black Sea (Pontus Euxinus) near Heraclea Pontica
- Lycus (river of Cilicia), which flows from the Pyramus to the Pinarus
- Lycus, now known as Kouris, in Cyprus that flows into the Mediterranean Sea at Kourion
- Lycus (river of Lydia), a tributary of the Hyllus river
- Lycus (river of Mysia), near Carseae
- Lycus (river of Phoenicia), which flows into the Mediterranean near Beirut
- Lycus (river of Phrygia), a historical river, a tributary of the Maeander
- Lycus (river of Pontus), modern Kelkit, a river in the Black Sea Region of Turkey and the longest tributary of the Yeşil River
- Platani (river), a river of Sicily sometimes also called the Lycus
- Lycus (river of Constantinople)

== Other uses ==
- Lycus (beetle), a genus of net-winged beetles
- Battle of the Lycus, fought in 66 BC between the Roman Republic army of Pompey and the forces of Mithridates VI of Pontus
- Lycus (band)
- Lycos, a search engine and Web portal

== See also ==
- Lycus Sulci, a feature in the Amazonis quadrangle on Mars
