= Yağlıdere stream =

Stream in Giresun Province, Turkey

Coordinates: 40.9479°N 38.6917°E

Yağlıdere
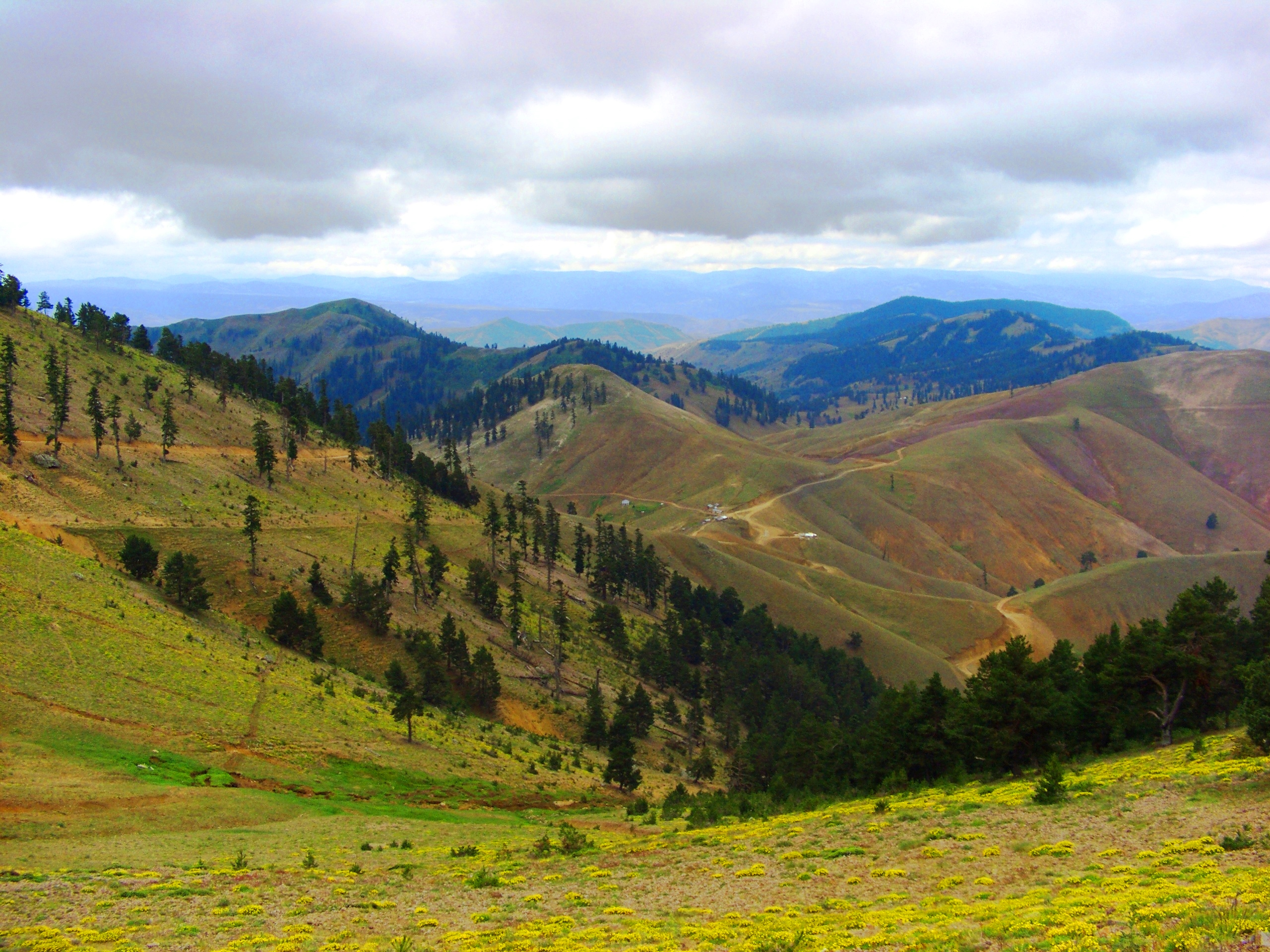
- Native name: Yağlıdere Çayı (Turkish)

Location
- Country: Turkey
- Province: Giresun Province

Physical characteristics
- Mouth: Black Sea
  - location: west end of Espiye, Giresun Province
- Length: 70 kilometres (43 mi)

Basin features
- Tributaries
  - left: Tohumluk Creek
  - right: Kılıçlar stream

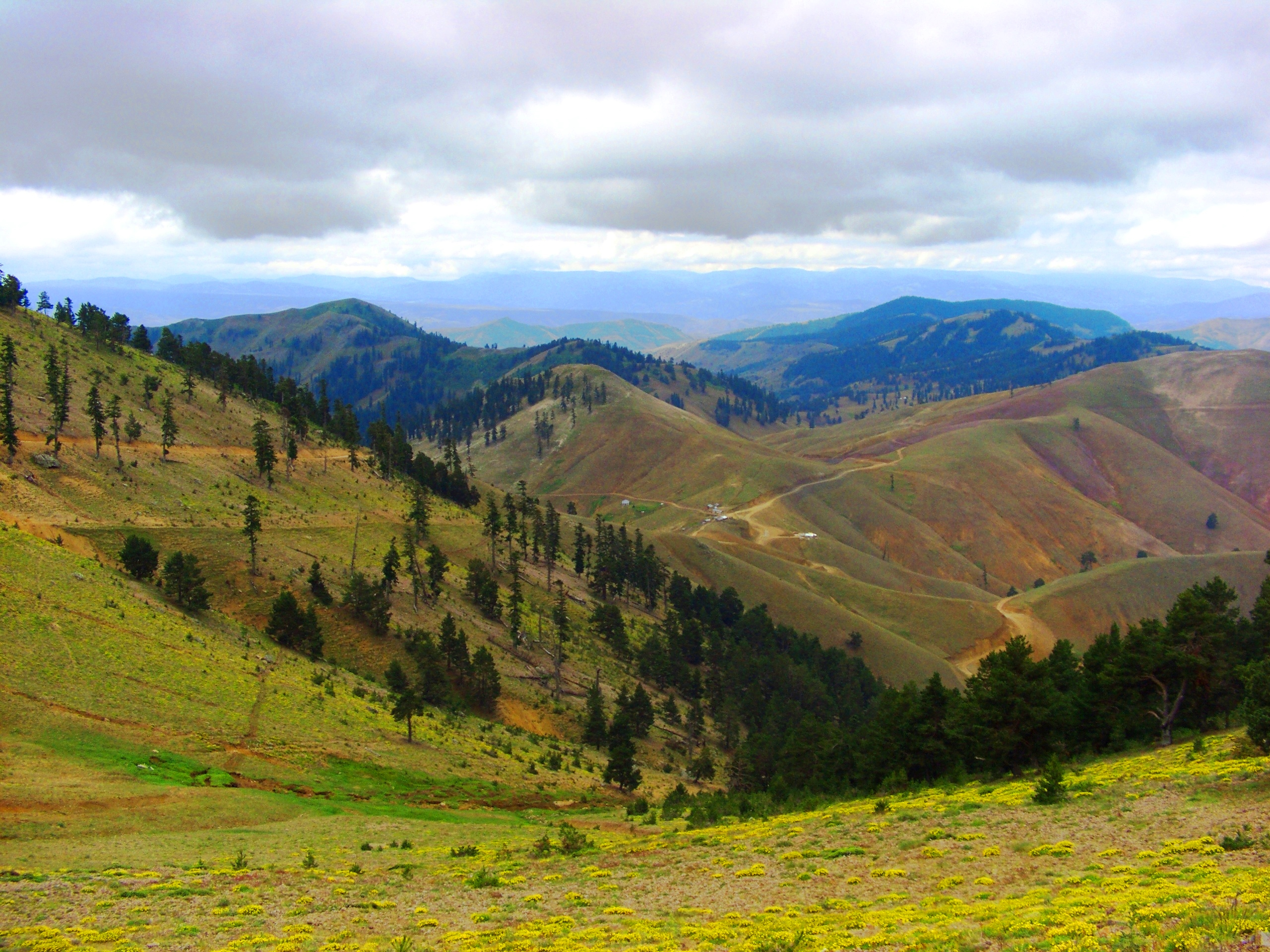
Kurtbeli, the birthplace of Tohumluk stream, a main tributary of Yağlıdere

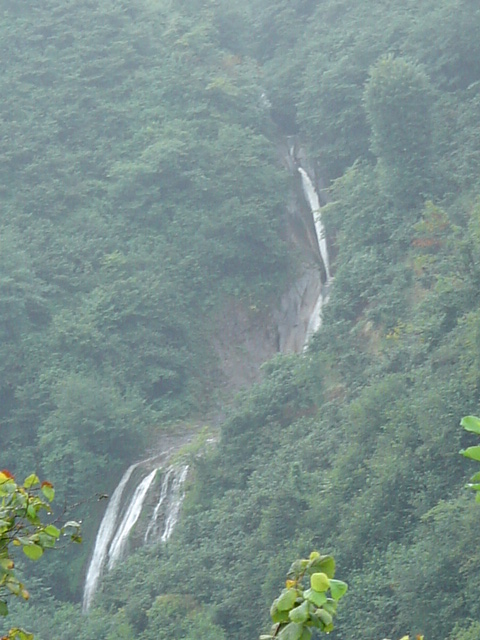
Cibril deresi, a small tributary of Yağlıdere joining to it in Köprübaşı in Espiye, Giresun

Yağlıdere (Turkish: Yağlıdere Çayı) is a stream that flows to the Black Sea in the west end of Espiye, the capital town of Espiye district in Giresun Province in Turkey.

== Description ==
The stream has two major and many small tributaries. Tohumluk Creek, one of its main arms, begins in Kurtbeli highland and is used by nomadic people in summers. Kılıçlar stream begins in Erimez. These arms flow north to Üçköprü of Çakrak village and join each other there. After this point, the stream is called as Yağlıdere. In its narrow valley it flows to the town of Yağlıdere, the center of the district with the same name. Finally it ends in the Black Sea near Espiye. It is 70 kilometres (43 mi) long.

It has high flow especially in spring because of rain and snow in the Giresun mountains. This has caused flooding in Yağlıdere in the past. Digging in the bed of the stream and pollution from solid wastes of Yağlıdere Municipality have created problems.

== Etymology ==
"Yağlıdere" is a generic compound word in Turkish. "Yağ" means "oil" or "butter", and "Yağlı" means "oily" or "with butter" in Turkish. "Dere" is "stream". Thus "Yağlıdere" can be translated into English as "Oily stream".

There are two hypotheses for the etymology of the name. According to local history, there was a dairy processing center in Çakrak village of Alucra district. This dairy center was collecting raw milk from surrounding villages via a coarse pipeline made from clays, and were discharging dairy waste such as whey into the stream through the village. Dairy waste on the surface of the stream made it look oily. Thus it was called as "Yağlıdere".

The other theory about its name comes from the natural view of the fluids. It has many small stream waterfalls joining to its main bed. Because of these waterfalls of tributaries and sharp falls of its main stream on the rocky bed, it appeared as if its surface is covered with a foamy layer of milk and/or cream. When people in the past viewed the scene formed with foam, they called it "Yağlıdere".
