= Gelevera =

Stream in Espiye, Turkey

Coordinates: 40°57′N 38°43′E

Gelevara Deresi is one of two main streams of Espiye, a district of Giresun province in the eastern Black Sea region of Turkey. Its two main tributaries arise in the highlands of Espiye district of Giresun and Torul district of Gümüşhane.

In the west its shorter arm originates from Çekümbeli highland near Tohumluk village. Its longer arm starts in Tekçam-Kürünbeli spring in Hanzara Obası and Ayıbeli Deresi in Ayıbeli Obası. The springs of its arms are close enough to each other to be reached in less than an hour by foot. The source of the longer arm looks like a triangular area which is used as the borders of three districts: Espiye, Alucra and Torul. Firstly it goes to northeast direction passing through Beytarla and Sapmaz villages of Kürtün district of Gümüşhane province, then enters into Giresun borders again. After the two arms of the stream flow parallel for nearly 40-50 kilometers they aggregate as Gelevara after Arpacık village in Güce district adjacent to Espiye district. Gelevara flows down to Black Sea in the east end of Espiye town like Yağlıdere stream, its sister. On its mouth to Black Sea there is a ferroconcrete bridge on D010 Highway connecting Giresun and Trabzon provinces.

Gelevara stream has a high voluminous flow because the mountainous and forestry area of its headwaters and because it receives much rain during almost all seasons. The stream is mainly utilized as a sands deposit in building concrete constructions locally. In its valley along the Espiye-Ericek-Çakıl route, there are hills covered by rich forests consisting of thousands of species of wild trees, flowers and animals.

== Etymology ==
"Gelevara" (pronounced as ghe-lee-va-ra) is a Turkish derivative word consists of two verbs, "gelmek (to come in English)" and "varmak (to arrive in English"). It is officially and mostly called as Gelevera Deresi in Turkish maps and documentaries there are some other local forms of its name like Özlüce, and some forms of folk dialects such as Gelivera, Gelivar, Gelevera, Gelevar, Gelava, and Gelenvar.

Although Dr. Z. Cebeci interprets that it carries a meaning like "come and arrive in the sea" that was used by local people living in mountainous area in order to express their deep wishes to see beauties of the sea there are two other logical hypothesis about the origin of Gelevera.

In the article titled "Gelivera, Kürtün" in Turkish Wikipedia, it is supposed that its name originates from "Gelivera", an old Greek village settlement (Sapmaz in present time) in Kürtün district of Gümüşhane. In this article it is stated that "gelivera" is a joint word formed with "gali" and "vera" meaning "beautiful" and "ring" in modern Greek, respectively. According to the second hypothesis its name originates from daily movements of villagers on it. Since the longer arm of the stream passes through "Gelivera" village the inhabitants had frequently to go and come back between two parts of the village over it. Every day they were going and coming back between the sides of the stream. And then they defined the stream as the waterflow that must be stepped to go and come back. So in order to define their routinely go-come movement they used "gel" and "var" verbs of Turkish, and its name became "Gelevara" in the time.

== Issues with Gelevara ==
The stream is being polluted with solid wastes of Espiye town. This serious environmental problem should be immediately solved with aid of some protection projects which will be operated by the Espiye Municipality. But any project needs the aid from international environmental organizations because the cost of recycling daily wastes of the town exceeds the income of the town municipality. At the same time the sand processing and excavations from the bed of the stream create sound pollution that fears the waterbirds and causes many other ecological problems. The existing freshwater flora and fauna is danger of extinction in the bed of the stream near Black Sea day to day. Also, the sand excavation must be stopped to prevent the changes of natural scene and structure of the stream.

== Gelevara Song ==
Gelevara Deresi is also the title of a famous Turkish folk song. This song carrying the typical characteristics of Black Sea variety of Turkic regional folks is about melancholic love story that has been lived somewhere along Gelevara stream valley. Originally it is performed with kemençe (kemenche in English, pronounced as kae-man-che), a local music instrument of Black Sea region of Turkey. This song with romantic notes about a dramatic love is recently remixed and performed by Kazım Koyuncu, and became more popular due to his duet with Şevval Sam. He performs the song on his album Hayde!.
