= Battle of Issus =

333 BC battle between Alexander the Great and Darius III

- Part of the Wars of Alexander the Great
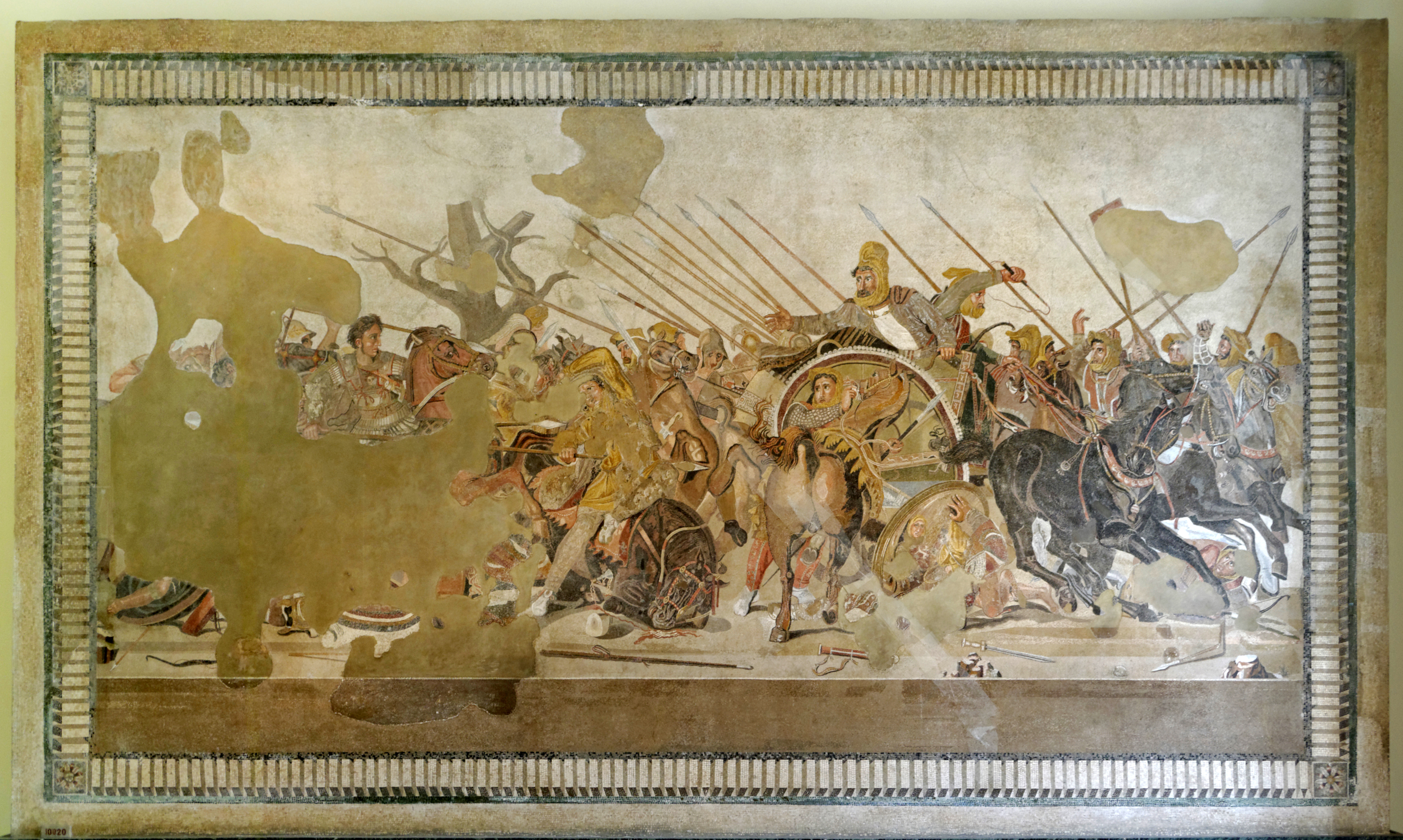
- c. 120–100 BC mosaic of the battle
Date	November 5, 333 BC
Location	Issus, Anatolia, Achaemenid Empire (modern-day Kinet Höyük, Yeşilköy, Dörtyol, Hatay, Turkey) 36.7525°N 36.1923°E
Result	Macedonian victory
Territorial changes	Alexander captures southern Asia Minor

Belligerents
Macedon; Hellenic League	Achaemenid Empire

Commanders and leaders
Alexander the Great; Parmenion; Craterus; Ptolemy; Balakros; Hephaestion; Menes of Pella	Darius III; Sabaces †; Arsames †; Rheomithres †; Atizyes †; Bubaces †; Oxyathres; Bessus

Strength
Total: c. 37,000: 24,000 heavy infantry: 9,000 phalangites; 3,000 hypaspists; 7,000 allied hoplites; 5,000 mercenary hoplites; 8,000 light infantry: 7,000 Thracians and Illyrians; 1,000 Agrianians and archers; 5,100 heavy cavalry: 1,800 Macedonian cavalry; 1,800 Greek Thessalian cavalry; 600 other Greek cavalry; 900 light cavalry (Thracians and Paeonians)	Modern estimate: 108,000–158,000; Ancient sources: 250,000–600,000: 30,000–80,000 light infantry (Note: Armed with Babylonian spears and Ionian peltasts); 11,000 cavalry; 10,000 Persian Immortals; 40,000 infantry Armenians and 7,000 Armenian cavalry; 10,000 Greek mercenaries

Casualties and losses
150 killed 4,500 wounded 302 missing	~20,000–40,000 casualties
- Location of the Battle of Issus Issus (Turkey)

The Battle of Issus (also Issos) occurred in southern Anatolia, on 5 November 333 BC between the Hellenic League led by Alexander the Great and the Achaemenid (or Persian) Empire, led by Darius III. It was the second major battle in Alexander's invasion of the Persian empire, and the first encounter between Darius III and Alexander the Great. The battle resulted in the Macedonian troops defeating the Persian forces. Darius was forced to flee, leaving behind his family and treasury which were captured by Alexander.

After the Battle of the Granicus, at which the Hellenic League soundly defeated the Persian satraps of Asia Minor, who were led by the Greek mercenary Memnon of Rhodes, Darius took personal command of his army. He gathered reinforcements and proceeded to lead his men in a surprise march behind the Hellenic advance, in order to cut off their line of supply. Alexander was forced to countermarch, and the stage was set for the battle near the mouth of the Pinarus River and the city of Issus.

== Location ==
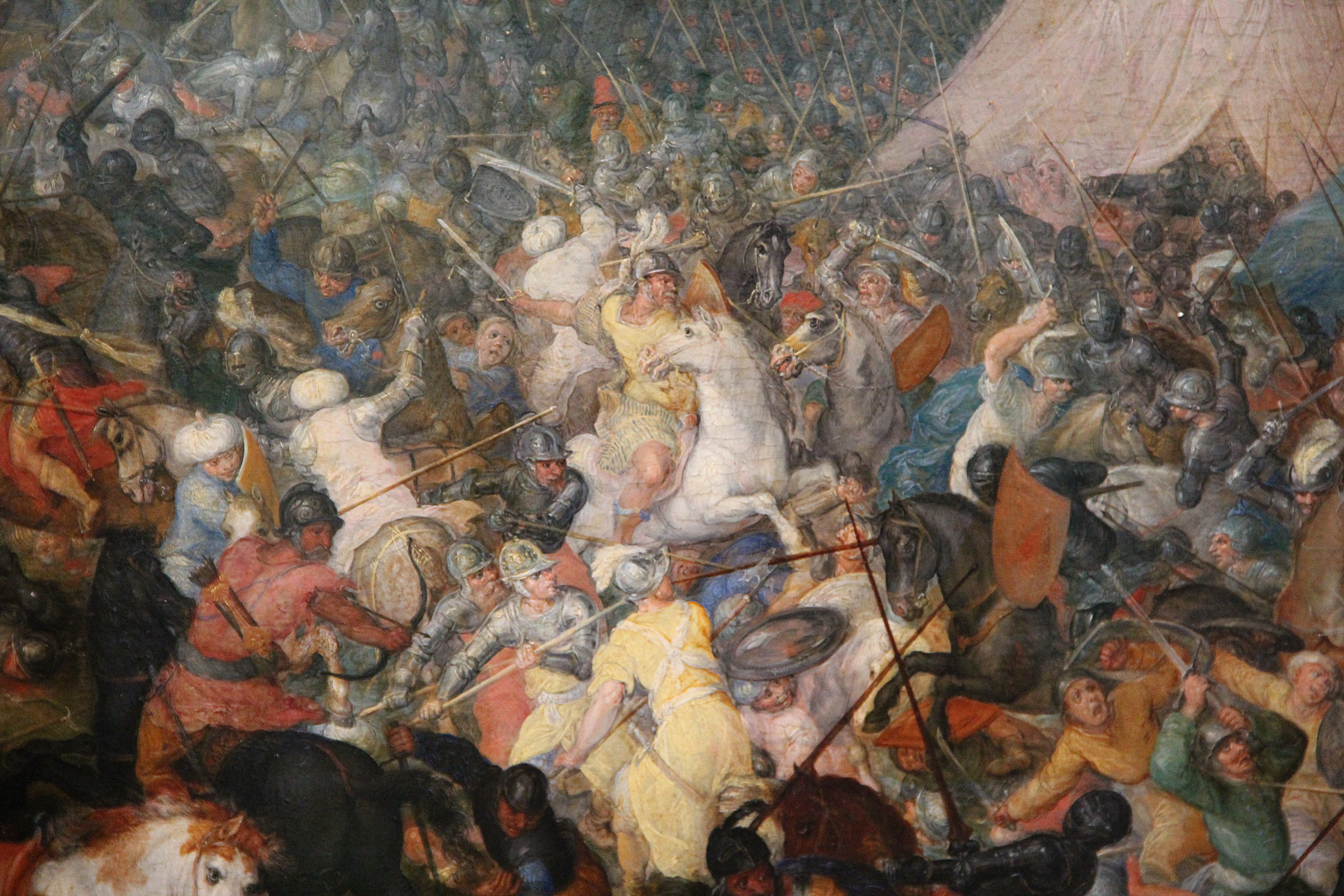
The Battle of Issus by Jan Brueghel the Elder in the Louvre

The battle took place south of the ancient city Issus, which is close to the present-day Turkish city of Iskenderun (the Turkish equivalent of "Alexandria", founded by Alexander to commemorate his victory), on either side of a small river called Pinarus. At that location, the distance from the Gulf of Issus to the surrounding mountains is only 2.6 km (2 mi), a place where Darius could not take advantage of his superiority in numbers. Speculation on the location of the Pinarus has taken place for over 80 years. Older historians believed it to be the Deli Tchai river, but historians N.G.L. Hammond and A. M. Devine claim that the Pinarus is actually the Payas River, the latter using his own examination of the course of the river, which he considered would not have drastically changed since antiquity. Their evidence is based on Callisthenes' accounts of the measurements of the battlefield and distances marched by both sides' armies in the prelude to the battle and distance given by Diodorus after the battle.

== Background ==
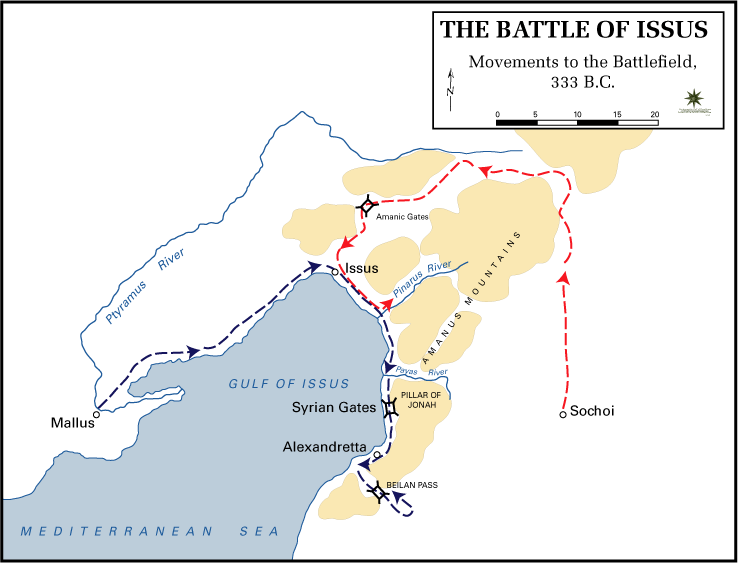
Movements to the battlefield. Red indicates Persian forces, and blue indicates Macedonian forces.

Alexander set out into Asia in 334 BC and defeated the local Persian satraps at the Battle of the Granicus. He then proceeded to occupy most of Asia Minor, with the idea of capturing all coastal settlements so as to negate the power of the vastly superior Persian fleet. He captured several important settlements such as Miletus in 334 BC and Halicarnassus. While Alexander was in Tarsus, he heard of Darius massing a great army in Babylon. If Darius were to reach the Gulf of Issus, he could use the support from the Persian fleet under Pharnabazus still operating in the Mediterranean Sea, thus easing his supply and possibly landing troops behind the enemy. Alexander kept his main army at Tarsus but sent Parmenion ahead to occupy the coast around Issus. In November, Alexander received reports that the great Persian army had advanced into Syria to a town named Sochoi. Alexander decided to mass his scattered army and advance south from Issus through the Pass of Jonah.

Darius knew that Parmenion held the Pass of Jonah and thus chose a northern route of advance. The Persians captured Issus without opposition and cut off the hands of all the sick and wounded that Alexander had left behind. Now Darius found out he had placed his army behind the Hellenic League and had cut their supply lines. He then advanced to the south and got no further than the river Pinarus before his scouts spotted Alexander marching north. Darius had to set up camp on this narrow coastal plain.

== Motives ==
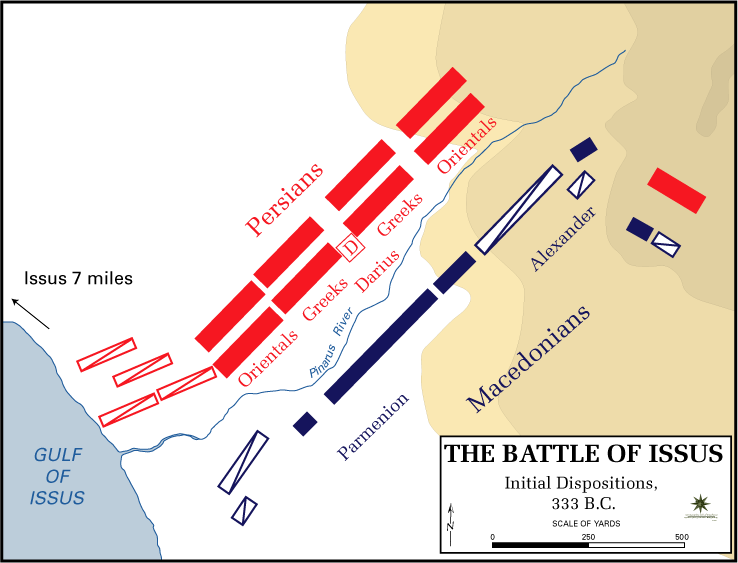
Initial dispositions of Persian and Macedonian forces

There is much debate as to the motives of Alexander and Darius preceding Issus. One modern perspective, based on Curtius, is that Darius was forced to move camp to terrain that favored Alexander because Alexander was fighting defensively due to a recommendation by his war council and Parmenion. Darius' large army could not be supported in the field during winter and his cities in Phoenicia were already in unrest at the arrival of Alexander. Darius was forced to move his large army to a small battlefield, greatly to the advantage of Alexander's smaller force.

Alexander was waiting for Darius to come south around the Amanus Mountain range because the pass Darius would have used, the Belen Pass, was much closer to Sochoi and offered the quickest access to the area Alexander defended. Alexander was waiting 15 km (9.3 mi) to the west of the Belen Pass at Myriandus to spring a trap on Darius as he crossed through the Belen Pass or through the Pillar of Jonah if he moved north, where Darius' army would be disorganized and disjointed in the narrow crossing. Darius instead moved north from Sochoi and around the mountains, through the Amanic Gate or another nearby pass, emerging behind Alexander's position and on his supply and communication lines. Thus Alexander was forced to march to Darius, who had caught him off guard in a large flanking maneuver. This gives the illusion that Darius was the one acting defensively, since Alexander was forced to march to him.

== Combatants ==
=== Persian army ===
Some ancient sources (Arrian and Plutarch), who based their accounts on earlier Greek sources, estimated 600,000 Persian soldiers in total, while Diodorus and Justin estimated 400,000, and Curtius Rufus estimated 250,000.

Modern historians find Arrian's count of 600,000 men highly unlikely. They argue that the logistics of fielding more than 100,000 soldiers in battle were extremely difficult at the time. Hans Delbrück gives an estimate as small as 25,000, although most (including Engels and Green) estimate the total size of Darius' army to be no larger than 100,000 at Issus, including 11,000 cavalry, 10,000 Persian Immortals, and 10,000 Greek mercenaries.

=== Hellenic army ===
The size of the Hellenic army may not have exceeded 40,000 men, including their other allies, led by Alexander. Alexander's army may have consisted of about 24,000 heavy infantry (9,000 phalangites, 3,000 hypaspists and 7,000 allied and 5,000 mercenary Greek hoplites), 13,000 light infantry (peltasts, archers, slingers) and 5,850 cavalry.

== Battle ==
The Greeks advanced through the Pillar of Jonah. Alexander led his Companion cavalry on the right flank and he set his Thessalian allied cavalry on the left of the phalanx with Parmenion in command.

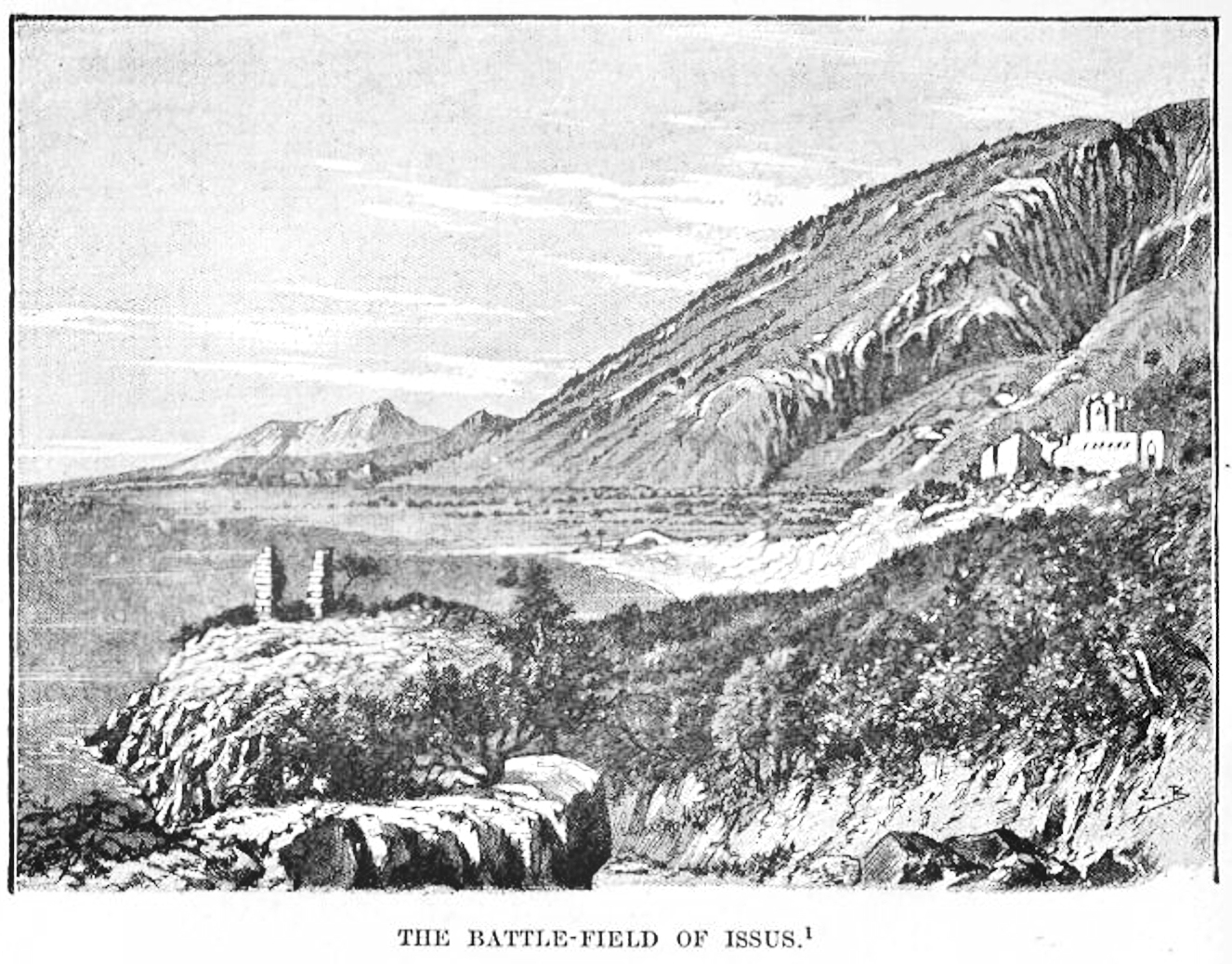
The battlefield at Issus

Darius formed his line with his heavy cavalry concentrated next to the coast on his right, followed by the Greek mercenary phalanx (historian A. M. Devine places them at a strength of 12,000, comparable to Alexander's Greek phalanx). Next to the Greek phalanx Darius spread his Persian infantry, the Cardaces, along the river and into the foothills, where they wrapped around to the other bank and threatened Alexander's right flank (the formation resembled gamma, Γ). Arrian gives an inflated figure of 20,000 to these troops. Darius positioned himself in the centre with the Greek mercenaries, his royal cavalry guard, and his best infantry. According to some historians, like P. Stratikis, he was trying to replicate the Hellenic battle formation of the Battle of the Granicus.

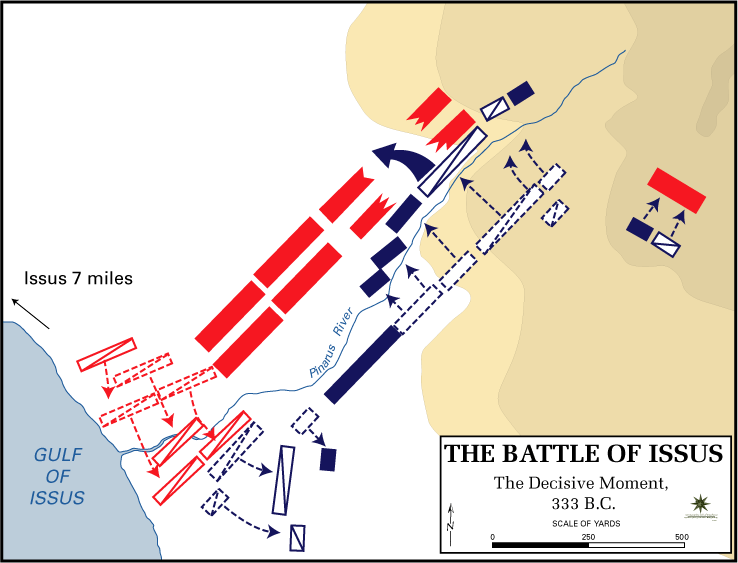
Alexander's decisive attack

The Persian cavalry first charged Parmenion and the allied cavalry, crossing the river to open battle. Alexander's right wing became the crux of the battle, as at Gaugamela two years later, where Parmenion held the left wing long enough against superior Persian numbers for Alexander to make his calculated cavalry strike against Darius and break the Persian army. The infantry of the Greek left flank was commanded by the general Craterus, in a promotion from his position commanding a single brigade of pezhetairoi infantry at the Granicus.

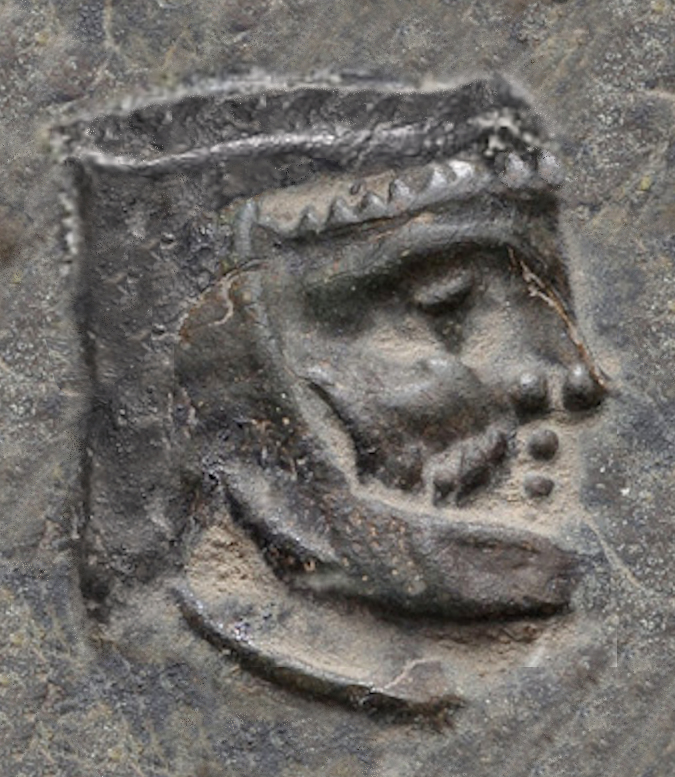
Sabakes, the Achaemenid satrap of Egypt, died at the Battle of Issus defending Darius III.

Things did not go well for the Macedonians in the beginning. Their center phalanx, having to advance across a river and up a fortified bank, suffered severely against the Greek mercenaries waiting for them on the other side. Arrian noted that a hundred and twenty Macedonians "of note" (probably meaning officers) were slain here, and the Macedonians were forced to retreat across the river. In the left flank, the Thessalian struggled against the outnumbering mass of Persian heavy horse that faced them, delivering charges and retreating again to buy time.

Then the Hypaspists led by Alexander on foot delivered an assault on the Cardaces, and managed to punch a hole through the Persian line. The Agrianians too drove back a mass of Persian skirmishers menacing Alexander's far right, securing the flank of the Companions. Alexander then mounted a horse at the head of his Companions and led a direct assault against Darius and his bodyguards, causing them to flee from the battlefield. Alexander then saw his left flank and center in trouble, and allowing Darius to flee, he crashed into the rear of the Greek mercenaries. The Greek mercenaries broke up and started retreating from the battlefield as well. The Persians saw that their Great King had gone and that the battle was being lost, and they abandoned their positions and fled in full rout. The Hellenic cavalry pursued the fleeing Persians for as long as there was light. As with most ancient battles, significant carnage occurred after the battle as the pursuing Greeks slaughtered their crowded, disorganized foe. Arrian notes Ptolemy mentioning that while pursuing Darius, Alexander and his bodyguards came upon a ravine which they easily crossed on the piled up bodies of dead Persians. It was a decisive victory for Alexander.

== Aftermath ==
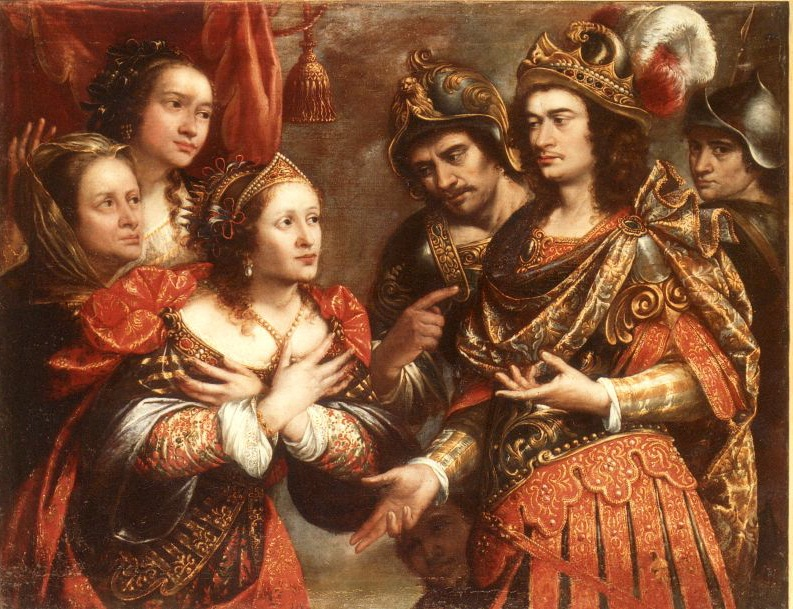
The family of Darius in front of Alexander, by Justus Sustermans and displayed in the Biblioteca Museu Víctor Balaguer

The Battle of Issus was a decisive Hellenic victory and it marked the beginning of the end of Persian power. It was the first time the Persian army had been defeated with the King (Darius III at the time) present. After the battle, the Hellenes captured Darius' wife, Stateira I, his daughters, Stateira II and Drypetis, and his mother, Sisygambis, all of whom had accompanied Darius on his campaign. Alexander, who later married Stateira II, treated the captured women with great respect.

Later, the Spartan king Agis III recruited the Greek mercenary survivors of the Battle of Issus who had served in the Persian army, a force of 8,000 veterans, and used them in his fight against the Macedonians. In the summer of 331 BC, Agis defeated Coragus, the Macedonian general in command of the Peloponnese and the garrison of Corinth, but was finally defeated at the Battle of Megalopolis.

== Depictions of the battle ==
Altdorfer's The Battle of Alexander at Issus

- German Renaissance painter and printmaker Albrecht Altdorfer (c. 1480–1538): The Battle of Alexander at Issus (1529).
- The Battle of Issus (c. 1599–1600) by Jan Brueghel the Elder (1568–1625) hangs in the Louvre.

== Sources ==
=== Ancient ===
- Diodorus Siculus (90–30 BC). Bibliotheca Historica. (Reference 6)
- Quintus Curtius Rufus (AD 60–70). Historiae Alexandri Magni.
- Plutarch (AD 75). The Life of Alexander the Great, Parallel Lives.
- Arrian (AD 86–146). Anabasis Alexandri.
- Junianus Justinus (3rd century). Historiarum Philippicarum libri XLIV.

=== Modern ===
- Delbrück, Hans (1920). History of the Art of War. University of Nebraska Press. Reprint edition, 1990. Translated by Walter, J. Renfroe. 4 Volumes.
- Engels, Donald W. (1978). Alexander the Great and the Logistics of the Macedonian Army. Berkeley/Los Angeles/London.
- Fuller, John F. C. (1960). The Generalship of Alexander the Great. New Jersey: Da Capo Press.
- Green, Peter (1974). Alexander of Macedon: A Historical Biography.
- Moerbeek, Martijn (1997). The battle of Issus, 333 BC. Universiteit Twente.
- Rogers, Guy (2004). Alexander: The Ambiguity of Greatness. New York: Random House.
- Warry, J. (1998), Warfare in the Classical World. ISBN 1-84065-004-4.
- Welman, Nick. Army. Fontys University.
