= Attaea =

Ancient city

Attaea or Attaia (Ancient Greek: Ἄτταια) was a city of Classical Anatolia in the region of the Caicus River or Lycus River. It minted coins inscribed "ΑΤΤΕΑΤΩΝ" from Caracalla's time simultaneously with those who have the legend "ΑΤΤΑΙΤΩΝ." It was also the site of a bishopric and was an important site for early Christianity. Attaea is today a titular see of the Roman Catholic Church in the ecclesiastical province of Ephesus. Its site seems to be at Ajasmat köi on the right bank of Ajasmat chaí, 3 kilometres (1.9 mi) east of the Sunabai shore.

== Known bishops ==
- Fortunado Devoto (2 September 1927 – 29 June 1941)
- Eduardo Martinez González (29 March 1942 – 14 December 1950)
- Vitale Bonifacio Bertoli (5 April 1951 – 10 March 1967)
