= Tohumluk Creek =

River in Giresun, Turkey

Tohumluk Creek (Turkish: Tohumluk Deresi) is one of two main tributaries of the Yağlıdere stream in the Kurtbeli highlands of the Alucra district in Giresun Province, Turkey.
