= Espiye District =

District of Giresun Province, Turkey

- District
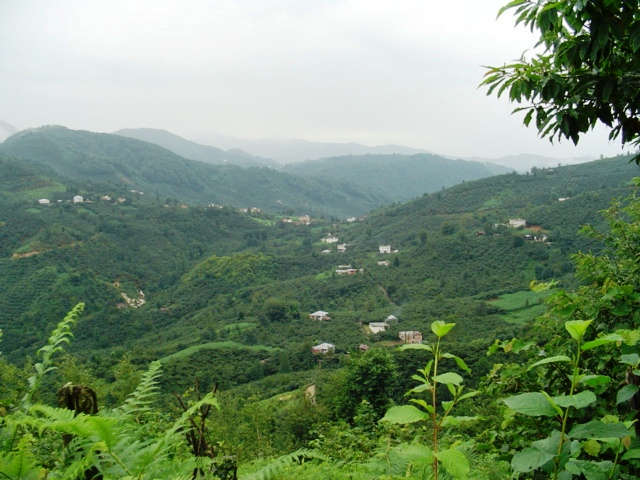
- The village of Cibril

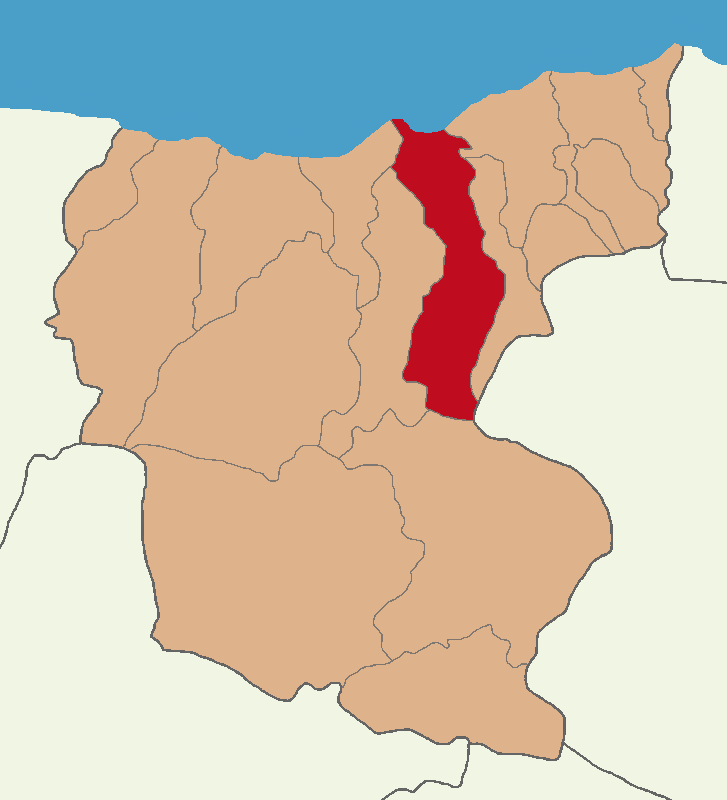
- Map showing Espiye District in Giresun Province

- Location within Turkey
- Coordinates: 40°47′N 38°46′E
- Country: Turkey
- Province: Giresun
- Seat: Espiye

Government
  - Kaymakam: Taner Tengir
- Area: 248 km^{2} (96 sq mi)
- Population (2022): 37,775
  - Density: 152/km^{2} (395/sq mi)
- Time zone: UTC+3 (TRT)
- Website: www.espiye.gov.tr

Espiye District is a district of the Giresun Province of Turkey. Its seat is the town of Espiye. Its area is 248 km^{2}, and its population is 37,775 (2022).

== Composition ==
There are two municipalities in Espiye District:

- Espiye
- Soğukpınar

There are 31 villages in Espiye District:

- Akkaya
- Aralıcak
- Arpacık
- Avluca
- Aydınlar
- Bahçecik
- Bayrambey
- Çalkaya
- Çepni
- Değirmenağzı
- Demircili
- Direkbükü
- Ericek
- Gebelli
- Gülburnu
- Gümüşdere
- Güneyköy
- Güzelyurt
- Hacıköy
- Hacımahmutlu
- İbrahimşeyh
- Kaşdibi
- Kurugeriş
- Şahinyuva
- Sakarya
- Seydiköy
- Taflancık
- Tikence
- Yeniköy
- Yeşilköy
- Yeşilyurt
