= Kurtbeli =

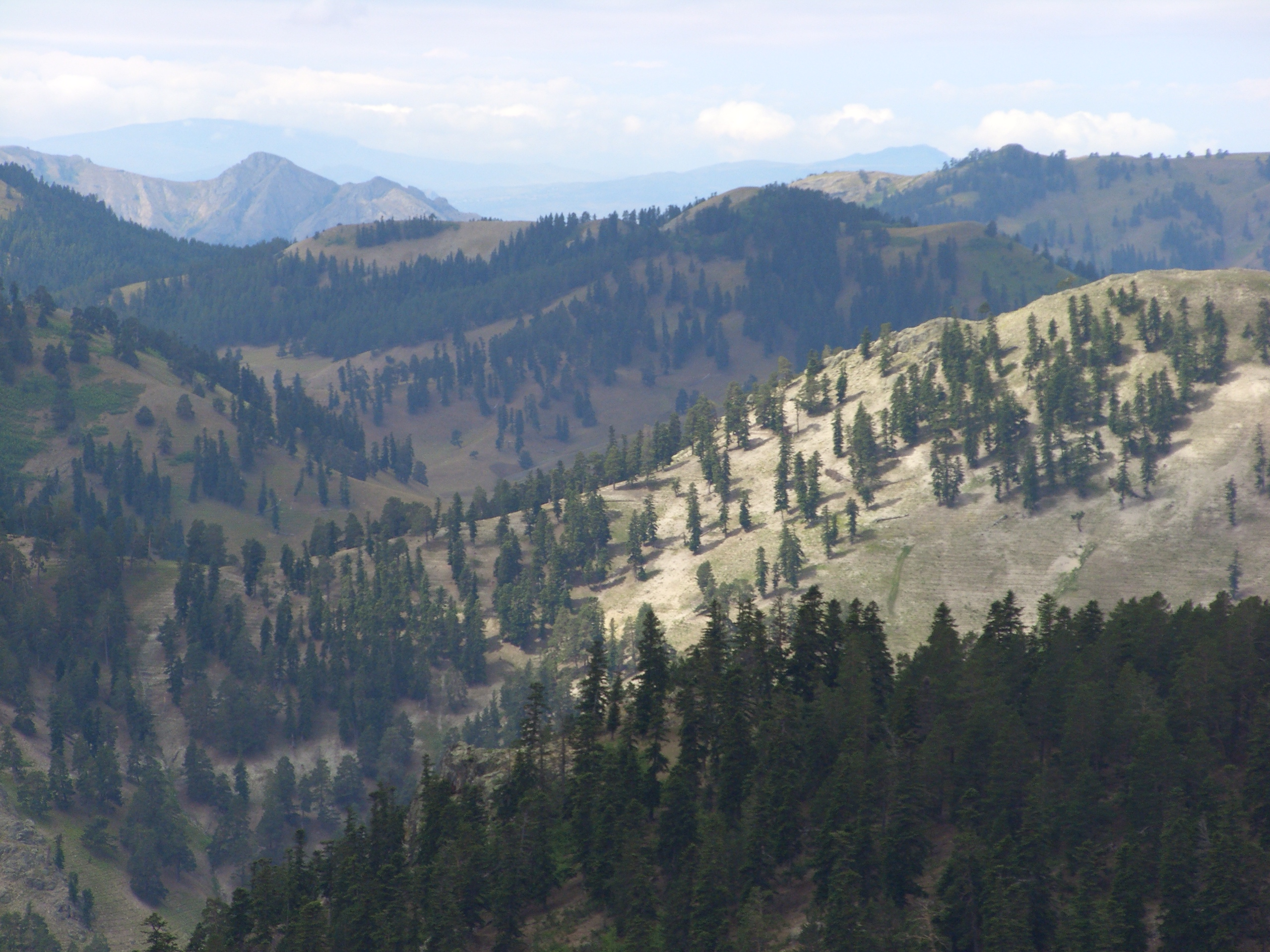
View of Kurtbeli

Kurtbeli is a lowland area of the Alucra district in Giresun Province of Turkey. It has rich caucasian fir and black pine forest and pastures. The highland is also a gate point between Espiye and Alucra districts. A narrow road connects two district zones to each other.
