= Didymateiche =

Ancient Mysian town

Coordinates: 40°17′10″N 27°16′28″E

Didymateiche (Ancient Greek: Δίδυμα τείχη), or Didymon Teichos (Ancient Greek: Δίδυμον Τεῖχος, 'twin walled'), was a town of ancient Mysia. It belonged to the Delian League since it appears in tribute records of Athens between the years 454/3 and 418/7 BCE. Polybius writes that it was among the places that were conquered by Attalus I, after the city of Carseae.

Its site is located north of Biga / Çanakkale, Turkey, Asiatic Turkey.
