= Dim Dam =

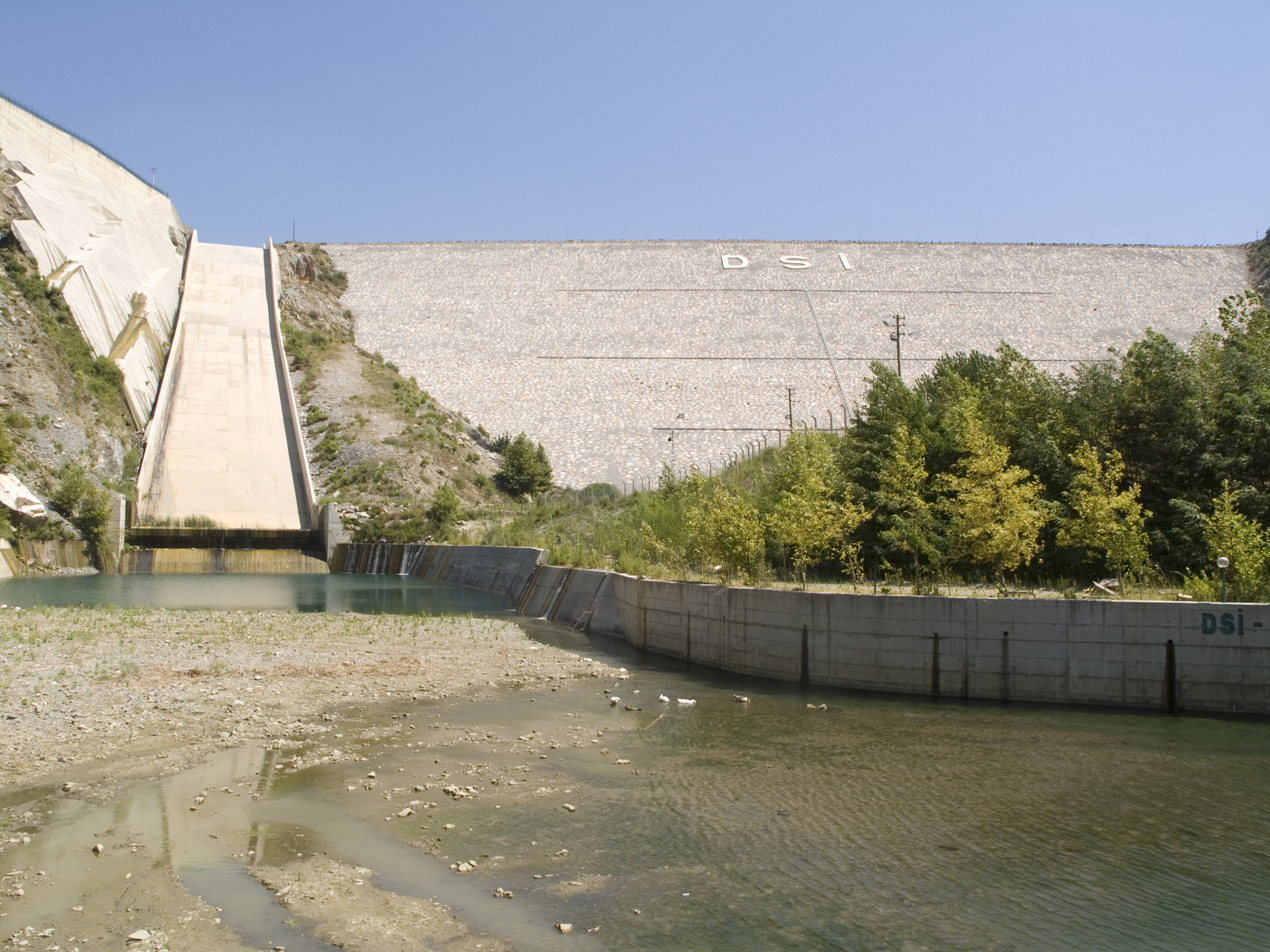

- Location within Turkey
- Official name: Dim Baraji
- Country: Turkey
- Location: Alanya
- Coordinates: 36°33′03″N 32°8′22″E
- Status: Operational
- Construction began: 1996
- Opening date: 2007

Dam and spillways
- Type of dam: Embankment, concrete-face rock-fill
- Impounds: Dim River
- Height (foundation): 134.5 m (441 ft)
- Height (thalweg): 123.5 m (405 ft)
- Length: 365 m (1,198 ft)
- Width (crest): 8 m (26 ft)
- Dam volume: 4,950,000 m^{3} (6,474,356 cu yd)
- Spillway type: Chute

Reservoir
- Total capacity: 253,000,000 m^{3} (205,110 acre⋅ft)
- Surface area: 4.5 km^{2} (2 mi^{2})

Power Station
- Installed capacity: 38 MW
- Annual generation: 123 GWh

Dim Dam is a concrete-face rock-fill dam on the Dim River located 12 km (7 mi) east of Alanya in Antalya Province, Turkey. Constructed between 1996 and 2007, the development was backed by the Turkish State Hydraulic Works. The primary purpose of the dam is water supply and it provides water for the irrigation of 5,312 ha (13,126 acres). Additionally, the dam supplies a 38 MW hydroelectric power plant with water.

== See also ==
- List of dams and reservoirs in Turkey
