= Tirebolu =

- Municipality
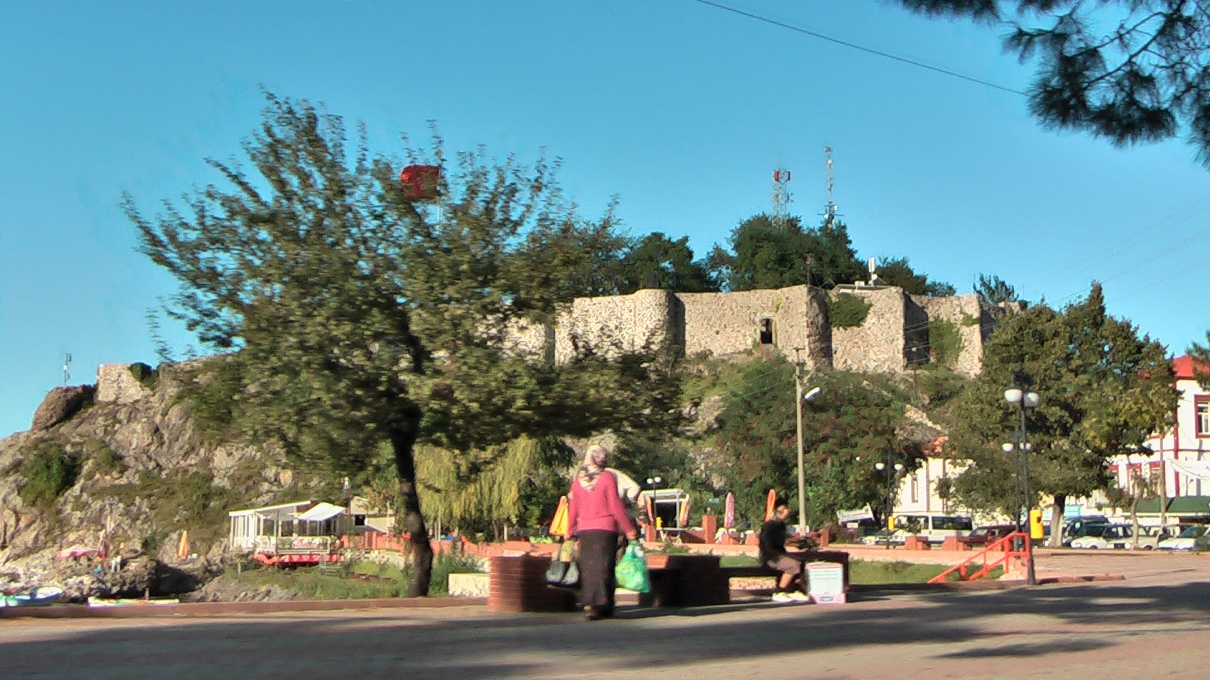

- Location within Turkey
- Coordinates: 41°0′20″N 38°49′0″E
- Country: Turkey
- Province: Giresun
- District: Tirebolu

Government
  - Mayor: Bülent Kara (İYİ)
- Elevation: 50 m (160 ft)
- Population (2022): 20,671
- Time zone: UTC+3 (TRT)
- Postal code: 28500
- Area code: 0454
- Climate: Cfa
- Website: www.tirebolu.bel.tr

Tirebolu is a town in Giresun Province, Turkey. It is the seat of Tirebolu District. Its population is 20,671 (2022).

== Geography ==
Tirebolu is located on a hill named Ayana, which rises from the Black Sea shore just to the west of the Harşit River estuary. Tirebolu has a small harbour and a fishing fleet, but the mainstay of the local economy is growing hazelnuts.

== History ==
In his Anabasis, the ancient Greek historian Xenophon (431–360 BC) wrote that Colchians, Drilae, Habibs, and Tiberians had been living in the eastern parts of the Black Sea region during the centuries (BC).

The Naturalis Historia of Pliny the Elder recounts that the ancient fortress city of Tripolis was founded (656 BC) as a trading colony of the Ancient Greek city-state of Miletos, one of nearly 90 along the Black Sea coast.

Tripoli was next part of the Roman Empire, Byzantine Empire, one of the three cities that give the town its name, the others being Andoz (today's Espiye) and Bedrama (or Bedrum) in the Harşit valley. When Alexios Komnenos (later Emperor Alexios I of Trebizond) and his brother David founded the Empire of Trebizond in April 1204, about the time the Fourth Crusade captured and sacked Constantinople, Tripoli became part of this empire. As late as 1404, it was part of the direct territory of the Emperor of Trebizond.

=== Turkish era ===
During the Trapezuntine period (13th century), the Chepni people settled Tirebolu. The ancient city's name was Turkified into the present name of Tirebolu. In 1916 the coast was occupied by Russian troops for two years during the First World War, being restored to Turkish control in 1917.

== Places of interest ==
- Tirebolu Castle
