= Tirebolu District =

District of Giresun Province, Turkey

- District
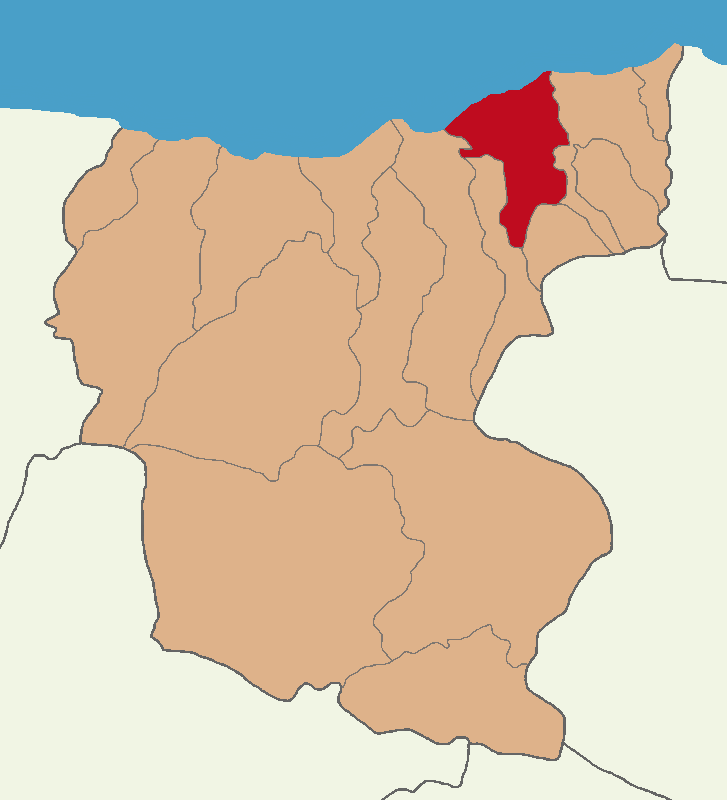
- Map showing Tirebolu District in Giresun Province

- Location in Turkey
- Coordinates: 40°58′N 38°52′E
- Country: Turkey
- Province: Giresun
- Seat: Tirebolu

Government
  - Kaymakam: Muhammed Lütfi Kotan
- Area: 259 km^{2} (100 sq mi)
- Population (2022): 32,576
  - Density: 130/km^{2} (330/sq mi)
- Time zone: UTC+3 (TRT)
- Website: www.tirebolu.gov.tr

Tirebolu District is a district of the Giresun Province of Turkey. Its seat is the town of Tirebolu. Its area is 259 km^{2}, and its population is 32,576 (2022).

== Composition ==
There is one municipality in Tirebolu District:

- Tirebolu

There are 48 villages in Tirebolu District:

- Akıncılar
- Arageriş
- Arslancık
- Aşağıboynuyoğun
- Ataköy
- Avcılı
- Belen
- Civil
- Çamlıköy
- Çeğel
- Danışman
- Doğancı
- Dokuzkonak
- Düzköy
- Edeköy
- Eymür
- Fatih
- Hacıhüseyin
- Halaçlı
- Harkköy
- Işıklı
- Iğnece
- Karaahmetli
- Karademir
- Kayalar
- Ketençukur
- Kovancık
- Kovanpınar
- Köseler
- Kuskunlu
- Kuzgun
- Menderes
- Mursal
- Ortacami
- Ortaköy
- Örenkaya
- Özlü
- Sekü
- Sultanköy
- Şenyuva
- Şirinköy
- Yağlıkuyumcu
- Yalç
- Yalıköy
- Yaraş
- Yeşilpınar
- Yukarıboğalı
- Yukarıortacami
