= Alucra District =

District of Giresun Province, Turkey

- District
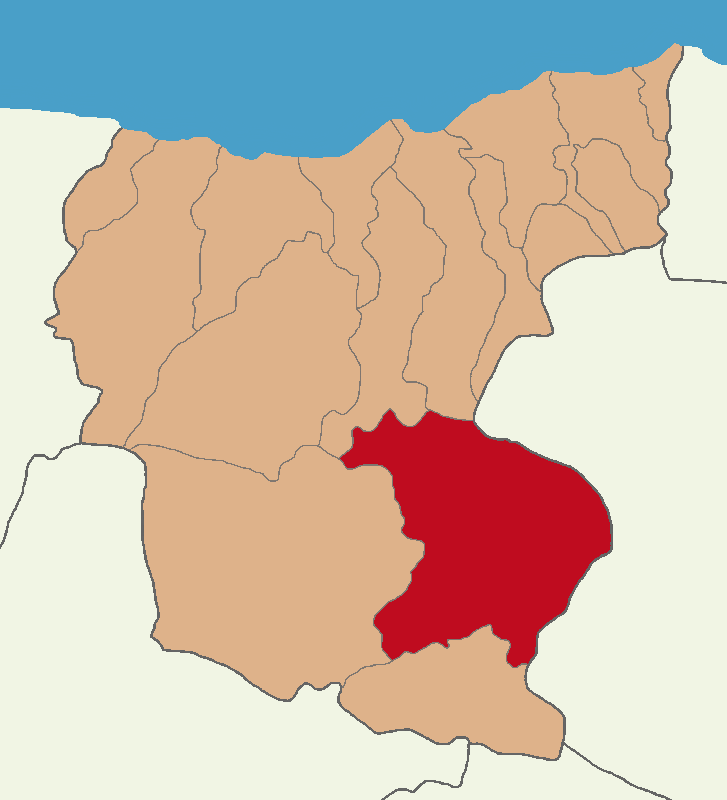
- Map showing Alucra District in Giresun Province

- Location in Turkey
- Coordinates: 40°19′N 38°46′E
- Country: Turkey
- Province: Giresun
- Seat: Alucra

Government
  - Kaymakam: Muhammet Cengiz
- Area: 1,138 km^{2} (439 sq mi)
- Population (2022): 8,574
  - Density: 7.5/km^{2} (20/sq mi)
- Time zone: UTC+3 (TRT)
- Website: www.alucra.gov.tr

Alucra District is a district of the Giresun Province of Turkey. Its seat is the town of Alucra. Its area is 1,138 km^{2}, and its population is 8,574 (2022).

== Geography ==
Alucra is an inland district, high in the Giresun Mountains, in the upper reaches of the Kelkit River. The weather on the Black Sea coast is typically wet and humid but Alucra is high inland therefore much cooler in winter, when it snows, and then dry and hot in summer. The snow melts in March and April and the spring rains last until June, during these months the rivers are full. The countryside is high mountain and pasture, with fir tree cover on the north-facing mountainsides and bare southern faces. Cattle are grazed in the pastures and some wheat is grown despite the dry summers, and in general Alucra is a collection of remote villages.

=== Composition ===
There is one municipality in Alucra District:

- Alucra

There are 38 villages in Alucra District:

- Akçiçek
- Aktepe
- Arda
- Arduç
- Armutlu
- Aydınyayla
- Bereketli
- Beylerce
- Boyluca
- Çakrak
- Çalgan
- Çamlıyayla
- Demirözü
- Dereçiftlik
- Doludere
- Elmacık
- Fevziçakmak
- Gökçebel
- Günügüzel
- Gürbulak
- Hacıhasan
- Hacılı
- İğdecik
- Kabaktepe
- Kaledibi
- Kamışlı
- Karabörk
- Kavaklıdere
- Köklüce
- Koman
- Konaklı
- Pirili
- Subaşı
- Suyurdu
- Tepeköy
- Tohumluk
- Yeşilyurt
- Yükselen
