= Kiliclar river =

River in Turkey

Kılıçlar Deresi (Turkish: Stream of Swords) is one of two main tributaries of Yağlıdere stream borns in Erimez highland of Alucra district of Giresun Province of Turkey.
