= Tirebolu Castle =

Castle in Tirebolu, Turkey

- Tirebolu, Giresun in Turkey
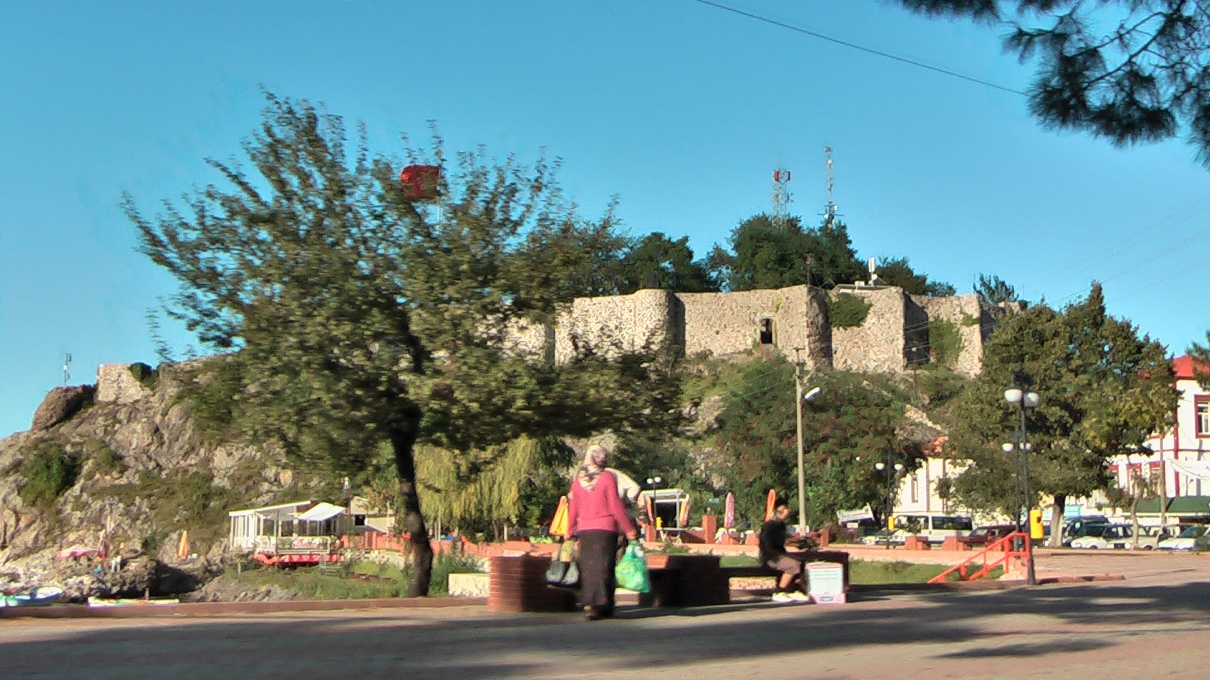
- Tirebolu Castle

Site information
- Type: Coastal fortification

Location
- Coordinates: 41.00744°N 38.82117°E

Tirebolu Castle (Turkish: Tirebolu Kalesi) is a fortification in Tirebolu district of Giresun Province, northern Turkey.

Tirebolu Castle, known as the "Saint-Jean Castle" in early times, is a small historic fortification located on the coast of a peninsula north of the town.

It was first built in the Hellenistic or Roman Period, and was completely renovated during the Kingdom of Pontus and took on the character of a medieval period castle. Built in accordance with the natural structure of the peninsula, it was constructed with rubble stone materials. The castle walls were supported by external buttresses at intervals. The wall stones are basalt, water-eroded stones from the nearby Harşit River and yellow and red blocks of Ünye limestone. Access to the castle is from the south by a 120-step steep staircase, which was built by the local district governor in the year 1896-1904. The entrance is through a low arched opening.

A lighthouse inside the castle, which operated with acetylene gas in 1911, ndid not survive to this day. The castle has undergone extensive restoration and repair in previous years. Its walls have survived until today. Inside the castle, t a here are ruins of a chapel, known as the Church of Virgin Mary, and a masjid, which are mentioned in yearbooks, as well as many gravestones from the Ottoman era.

Tirebolu Castle is open to public visits today.
