= Soğukpınar, Giresun =

Soğukpınar
- Municipality
- Location in Turkey
- Coordinates: 40°49′8″N 38°44′17″E
- Country: Turkey
- Province: Giresun
- District: Espiye
- Elevation: 620 m (2,030 ft)
- Population (2022): 2,645
- Time zone: UTC+3 (TRT)
- Postal code: 28605
- Area code: 0454
- Website: www.sogukpinar.bel.tr

Soğukpınar (literally "cool fountain") is a town (belde) in the Espiye District, Giresun Province, Turkey. Its population is 2,645 (2022). The distance to Espiye is 18 kilometres (11 mi). According to the earliest reference to the settlement as of 1530, the former name of Soğukpınar was Dikmen-Döğer referring to a Turkish tribe. Later in 1800s Greek workers also settled in the settlement to work in the mines around. But they left the settlement after the Population exchange agreement between Greece and Turkey in 1920s. In 1999 Soğukpınar was declared a seat of township. Hazel and corn are the main crops of Soğukpınar. Salmon trout and beehiving are other economic activities.
