= Dim River =

River in Turkey

Coordinates: 36°33′9″N 32°11′16″E

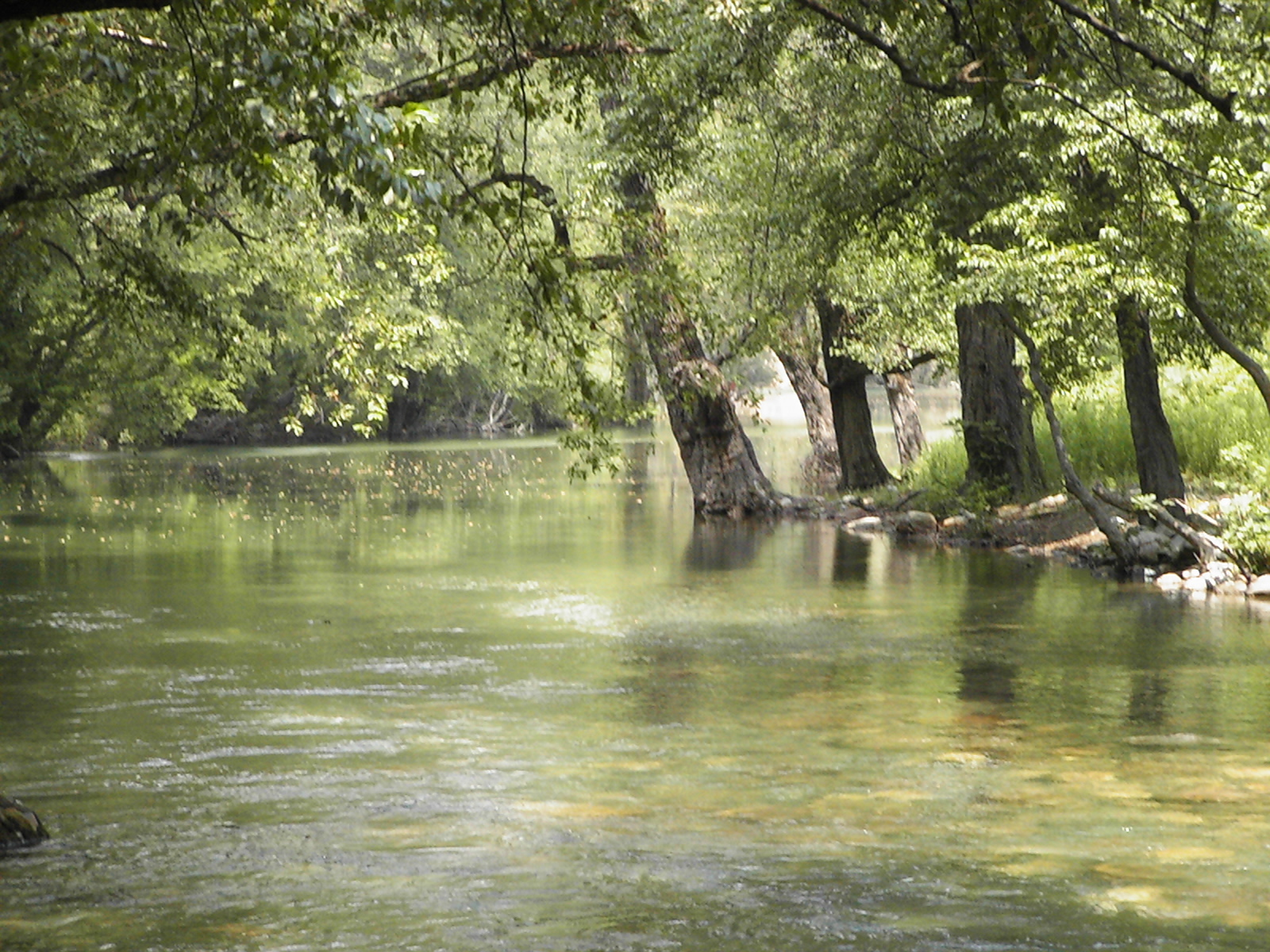
Dim Çayı

Dim River (Turkish: Dim Çayı) is a Turkish river, located in the Alanya district of Antalya province. The source of the Dim River are the river systems in the highlands of Konya Province, with the river itself around 60 kilometres (37 mi) flowing westwards into the Mediterranean Sea.

The river is a popular tourist destination, with the wide Dim Çayi Valley area containing many riverside restaurants and tourist facilities. Water in this river is cold, with the whole valley region generally more temperate than the rest of Turkey.

In 2007, the Dim Dam was completed, which provides fresh water and electricity for Alanya.
