= Payas River =

River in Turkey

The Payas River, in southern Anatolia near today's Turkey—Syria border, is believed to be the Pinarus River of antiquity, where Alexander the Great defeated Darius III of Persia in the First Battle of Issus, and the likely site of the second and third battles of the same name.

The identification is made based on distances measured by Alexander's bematists and observations of the local topography compared to the descriptions in ancient sources. It was previously thought that the Pinarus was the modern Deli Çay.

While historically important, the stream itself is not much more than a brook a few metres across, running westerly from the steep mountains and foothills to the east.
