= Cardaces =

Historical Infantry

The Cardaces (or Kardakes, meaning "foreign mercenary") were a professional heavy infantry mustering of the Achaemenid Persian army. They were formed some time before the Macedonian invasion (334 BCE).

There are debates among historians about the armament and tactics used by the Cardaces. The Persian army had earlier become heavily dependent upon Greek mercenaries and it may have been intended that the Cardaces – as Persian subjects – would complement the mercenaries.

According to Kambouris (2022), Kardaka may refer to the ethnic Persian draftees who were sparabara archers initially and later redelegated as armored close-quarter soldiers.

== Sources ==
- Pierre Briant, From Cyrus to Alexander: A History of the Persian Empire. Especially pages 1036–1037.
- Jeff Jonas, Kardakes or Cardaces: AtG Designer's notes. (Contains a letter by Duncan Head).
- Duncan Head, The Achaemenid Persian Army. Montvert Publications, 1992. pp. 42–43.
