= Carseae =

Town of ancient Mysia or Lydia

Carseae or Karseai (Ancient Greek: Κάρσεαι), or Careseae or Kareseai (Καρησέαι), also known as Karseis or Kerasai or Kerateis, was a town of ancient Mysia or of Lydia, cited by Polybius. King Attalus I, with some Galatae, made an incursion against this place, and he reached them after crossing the Lycus River; afterward he attacked Didymateiche. There is some probability that the place which is meant is the Caresus of Strabo; and there is nothing in the narrative of Polybius that is inconsistent with this supposition. This Lycus River is unknown.

Its site is unlocated.
