= Tohumluk, Alucra =

Tohumluk
- Village
- Location within Turkey
- Coordinates: 40°31′N 38°42′E
- Country: Turkey
- Province: Giresun
- District: Alucra
- Population (2022): 66
- Time zone: UTC+3 (TRT)

Tohumluk is a highland village of Alucra District of the Giresun Province of Turkey. Its population is 66 (2022).
