= Lycus (band) =

American metal band

Lycus was an American funeral doom metal band. They formed in 2008 in Sacramento, California, relocating to Oakland, California in 2011. They released an EP and two full length albums, one of which was on Relapse Records.

Discography:

- Demo MMXCI (2011, The Flenser, Graceless Recordings)
- Tempest (2013, 20 Buck Spin)
- Chasms (2016, Relapse Records)
