= Lycus (river of Cilicia) =

River in southern Anatolia

Lycus or Lykos (Greek: Λύκος) was an ancient river of Cilicia, mentioned only by Pliny (v. 22), that flowed between the Pyramus and Pinarus.
