= Deli Çay =

River in Turkey

The Deli Çay (Turkish: Crazy River) is a river in southern Anatolia near today's Turkey—Syria border.

It was formerly identified with the Pinarus River, where Alexander the Great defeated Darius III of Persia in the First Battle of Issus. But the distances measured by Alexander's bematists and observations of the local topography indicate that the Pinarus is actually the Payas River.
