= Çakrak, Alucra =

Çakrak
- Village
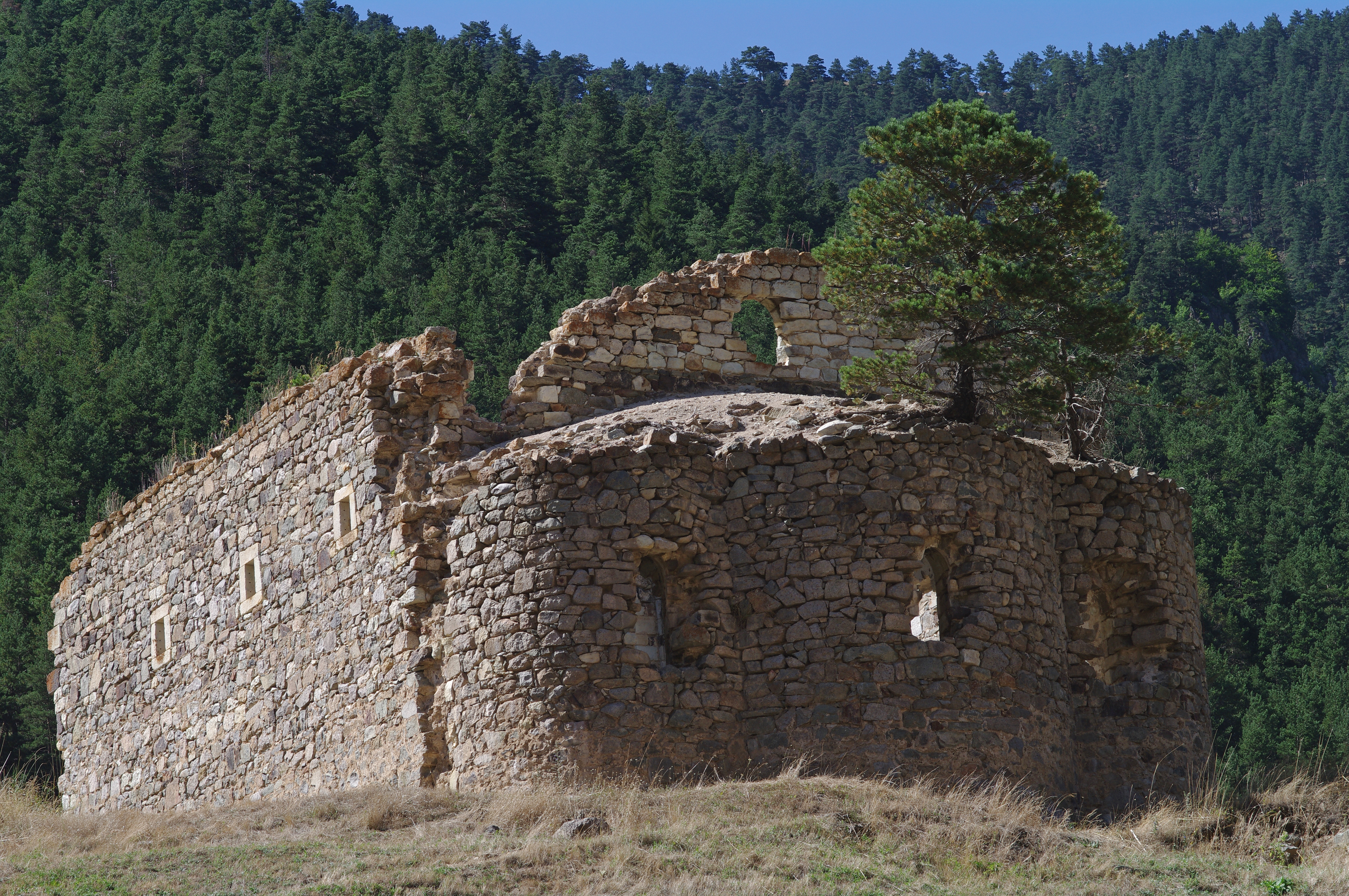
- Ruined church in Çakrak

- Location within Turkey
- Coordinates: 40°32′N 38°36′E
- Country: Turkey
- Province: Giresun
- District: Alucra
- Population (2022): 187
- Time zone: UTC+3 (TRT)

Çakrak is a village of Alucra District of Giresun Province of Turkey. Its population is 187 (2022).
