= Pinarus River =

River in Turkey

Coordinates: 36.7525°N 36.1923°E

The Pinarus River (Greek: Πίναρος) is a small stream in southern Anatolia near today's Turkey—Syria border. It was famous in antiquity as the site of the First Battle of Issus, where Alexander the Great defeated Darius III of Persia.

Ancient sources describe it as being near a small coastal village or town which straddled the stream. The river was said to run red with blood after Alexander the Great, leading his elite Companion cavalry turned the right flank of the Persians, smashed the center, and routed the Persian forces personally led by Darius III of Persia, who subsequently fled the field in a panic.

Speculation on the location of the Pinarus has been raging for over 80 years. It was formerly believed it to be the Deli Çay, but the distances measured by Alexander's bematists and observations of the local topography, as compared to ancient descriptions, indicate that the Pinarus is actually the Payas River.

The Issos River at approx. 36.30 east by 36.60 north is the geographical point that the battle is named after. The river starts in the hills and flows approx. 40 miles (64 km) due west to the coast.
