= Üçköprü, Kaynaşlı =

Village in Turkey

Üçköprü
- Village
- Location in Turkey
- Coordinates: 40°48′N 31°15′E
- Country: Turkey
- Province: Düzce
- District: Kaynaşlı
- Population (2022): 2,296
- Time zone: UTC+3 (TRT)

Üçköprü is a village in the Kaynaşlı District of Düzce Province in Turkey. Its population is 2,296 (2022).
