= Espiye =

- Municipality
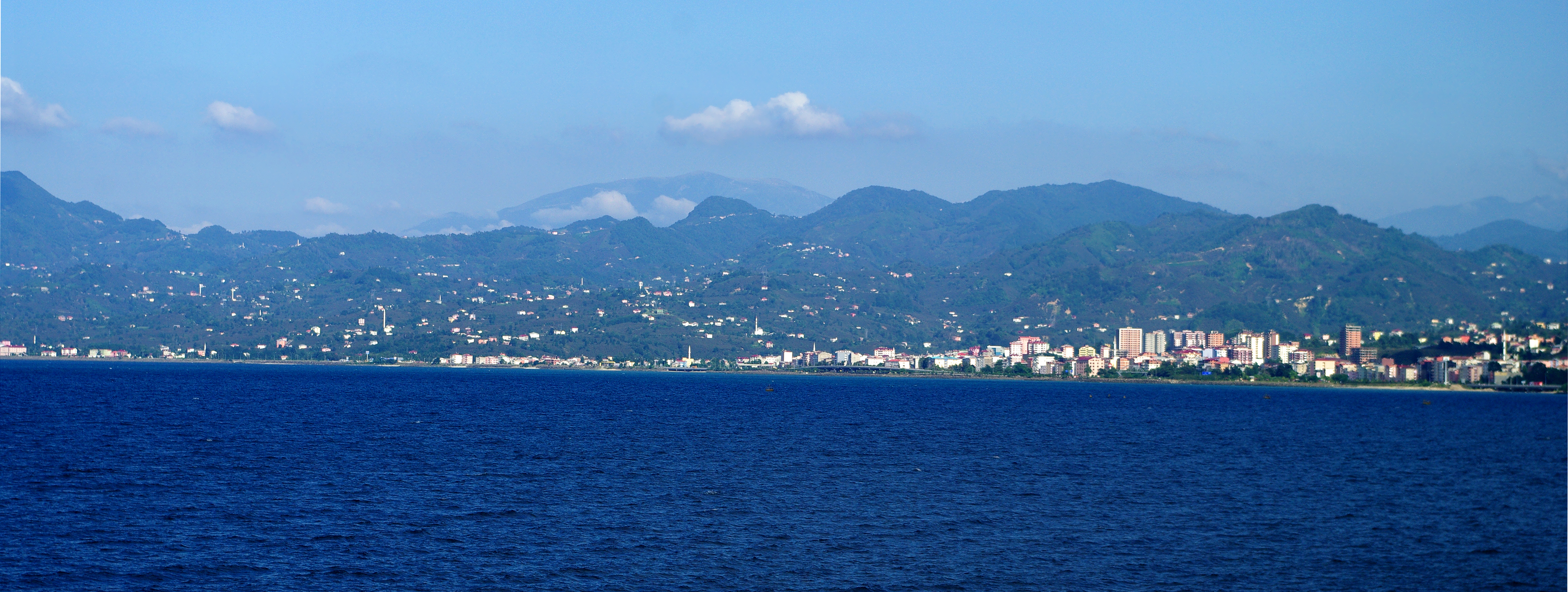
- The appearance of Espiye from the Black Sea

- Location within Turkey
- Coordinates: 40°57′N 38°44′E
- Country: Turkey
- Province: Giresun
- District: Espiye

Government
  - Mayor: Erol Karadere (CHP)
- Elevation: 10 m (33 ft)
- Population (2022): 26,671
- Time zone: UTC+3 (TRT)
- Postal code: 28600
- Area code: 0454
- Climate: Cfa
- Website: www.espiye.bel.tr

Espiye is a town in Giresun Province in the Black Sea region of Turkey. It is the seat of Espiye District. Its population is 26,671 (2022).

== Etymology ==
"Espiye" and its earlier spelling, "Esbüyeli", are the Turkish names for the district. Espiye is thought to be formed from two parts: "Esb", a Persian word meaning "horse" and the Turkish "-yeli" and "-yelü" suffix meaning "from" or "of", or possibly the suffix "yalı", a radix or generic word meaning "shore" or "waterside". So, Esbüyeli means "the land of horses" or "stables" or, alternatively, "the stables on the waterside".

== History ==
=== Antiquity ===
There is very limited information about the ancient history of Espiye, but slightly more of the larger nearby town of Tirebolu.

The area was part of the Roman Empire and its successors, the Byzantine Empire and the Empire of Trebizond. Copper was mined here in the 1st century AD, and Andoz Castle was later built on the west side of the modern day town, a sister castle of Tripolis (modern day Tirebolu), and Bedrama (or Bedrum) in the Harşit valley to the east of Espiye. However, the castle was too small to be the heart of a civil settlement. Measuring only 90 feet (27.43 m) by 20 feet (6.09 m), it was most likely used as a watchtower for advance warning of invading ships on the Black Sea.

=== The Turkish era ===
In the Ottoman Land Registry of 1515, "Esbüyeli" has been defined as "Çepni Eli" ("Chepni Province" or "Chepni's Homeland") and registered to Mustafa Bey I, son of Eshter Bey. The Chepni were a branch of the Oghuz Turks which between the 12th and 16th centuries settled in Kürtün in the mountains to the south of Espiye. The Chepni had a powerful cavalry of ten thousand horses, and therefore captured many districts on the Black Sea coast too, establishing the Anatolian beylik of Haci Emirli in Mesudiye to the west of Giresun.

In 1397, Suleyman Bey, commander of the Haci Emirli Beylik in the name of the Ottoman Empire, attacked the Greek armies of Trebizond and conquered Giresun. With this victory, the Ottomans took control of the coastal zone and Suleyman Bey was named "Conqueror of Giresun" by the Chepni, in respect to their victorious leader. However, Espiye was still within the territory of the Empire of Trebizond.

Sixty-four years later, in 1461, the Ottoman Emperor Fatih Sultan Mehmet moved against Trebizond in order to control the northeast end of his empire and quickly brought the Black Sea coast into the Ottoman Empire. Mehmet then gave control of the lands of Giresun, including Espiye, to the Chepnis in return for their support during the expedition. Moreover, he exempted them from paying taxes.

According to the registry of 1515, Espiye was a very small village consisting of sixteen houses plus six houses in the Andoz Castle; meaning, the population of Espiye must have been 80–100, a village in the district of Tirebolu. After the foundation of the Republic of Turkey in 1923, Espiye was still a subdistrict of Tirebolu but, in 1957, it became a district in its own right.

== Geography ==
The small plain between the rivers Yağlıdere and Gelevara, Espiye has typical characteristics of the eastern Black Sea region of Turkey, both in its hilly topography and its wet climate.

The town of Espiye is on the Black Sea coast, 28 km (17 mi) from Giresun. The Samsun-Trabzon Black Sea coast highway runs through here. Behind the town the land sharply rises to the south up into the Giresun Mountains. The highest point is Akılbaba Tepesi.

The countryside is very attractive in all shades of green; the higher mountainous area is mainly covered with dense forests of pines, firs, spruces, chestnuts, oaks, hornbeams, rhododendrons, beeches, and alders, while the coastal zone (up to 20–30 km inland) is densely planted with hazelnut trees and some tea.

The climate is generally rainy all year round; it is cool and rainy in summer and warm and rainy in winter in the coastal zones, but snowy in the mountainous area in the south.

The local cuisine includes the pizza-style pide and of course fish from the Black Sea.
