= Lycus (river of Lydia) =

Ancient river in Lydia

Lycus or Lykos (Greek: Λύκος) was an ancient river of Lydia that flowed in a southwesterly direction by the town of Thyatira. Whether it emptied itself directly into the Hermus, or only after joining with the Hyllus, is uncertain. (Plin. v. 31; comp. Wheler, vol. i. p. 253; P. Lucas, Troisieme Voyage, vol. i. p. 139, who, however, confounds the Lycus with the Hermus.)
