= Alucra =

- Municipality
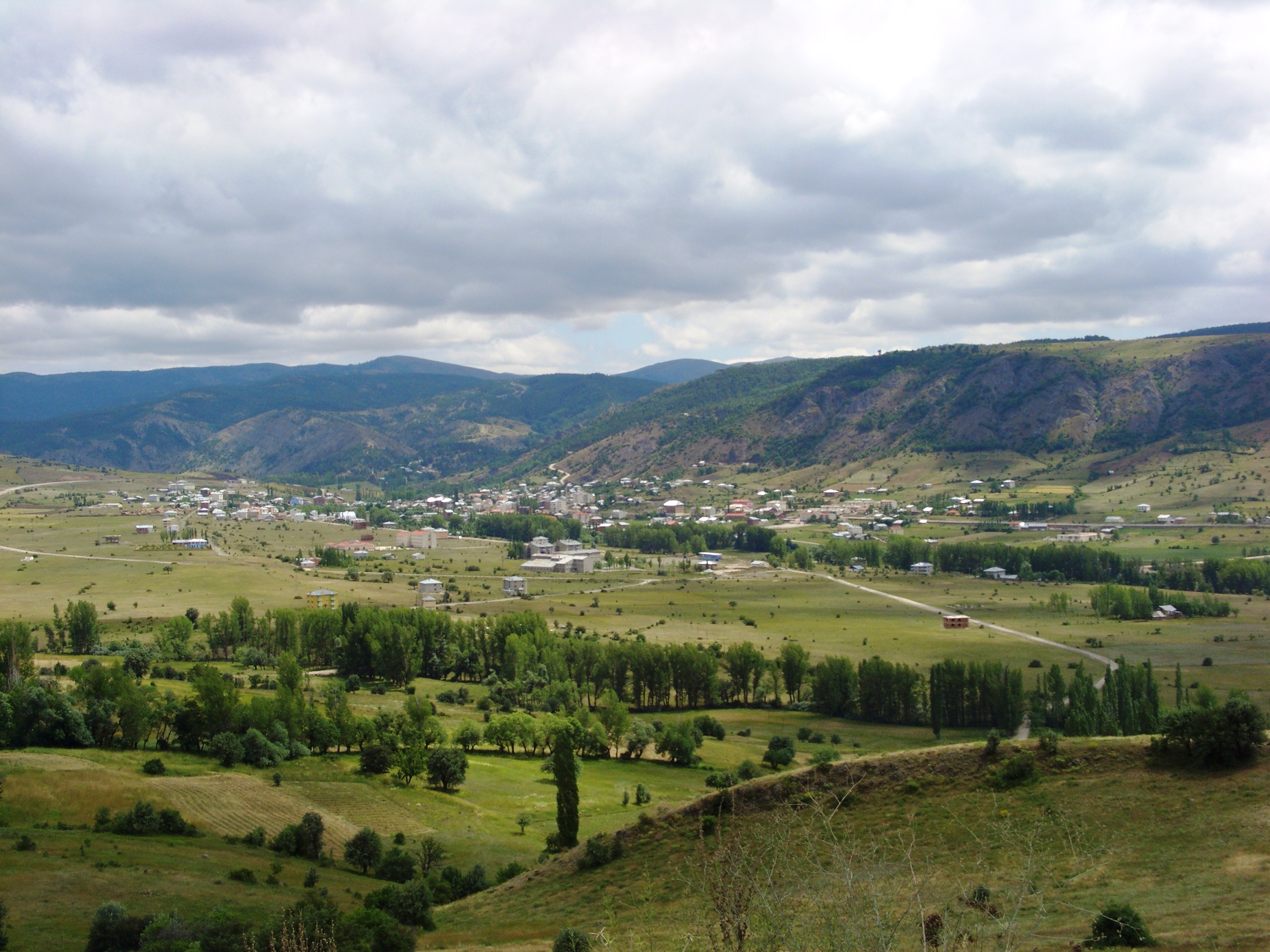

- Location within Turkey
- Coordinates: 40°19′N 38°46′E
- Country: Turkey
- Province: Giresun
- District: Alucra

Government
  - Mayor: Faruk Demirağ (AKP)
- Elevation: 1,524 m (5,000 ft)
- Population (2022): 3,945
- Time zone: UTC+3 (TRT)
- Postal code: 28700
- Area code: 0454
- Climate: Csb
- Website: www.alucra.bel.tr

Alucra is a town in Giresun Province in the Black Sea region of Turkey, 130 km (81 mi) from the city of Giresun. It is the seat of Alucra District. Its population is 3,945 (2022). It was a district of Şebinkarahisar province between 1924 and 1933.

== Etymology ==
Alucra is a modification of the Ottoman Empire name El Ücra meaning far-off or remote.

== Culture ==
Local cuisine includes:

- Fit (Düü) Çorbası - a soup made of onions and bulgur wheat
- Yağlaç - a cornflour-based polenta-style meal
- Pancar Çorbası - beetroot soup
- Ekmek Aşı - dried bread soaked in a stew of fried meat with onions and hot pepper
- Ayran Çorbası - yoghurt soup
- Kesme Çorbası - a kind of local minestrone soup with lentils and dumplings
- Helle - a soupy dish of bulgur and mint
- Oğlak Kebabı - yeanling kebab

In July, there is a well-known summer festival.

== History ==
This area has firstly been settled by the Hittites in ancient times. During the Middle Ages, Alucra was the part of the Byzantine Empire, disrupted by the Arab armies of the Abbasid caliphate.

Turks first came to the area in their 11th century movement into Anatolia from their homeland in Central Asia following their defeat of the Byzantines at the Battle of Malazgirt. From 1054 this area was settled by the Kipchak Turks from southern Russia, who moved into the area along the Black Sea coast, under the loose authority of the Seljuk Turks. The Seljuks assumed direct control by defeating the Mengujekids in 1228, but their rule came to an end with their defeat by the Mongol hordes at Kösedağ in 1243.

The Anatolian beyliks remerged despite the growth of the Ottoman Empire until the area was brought into Ottoman in 1473 with the defeat of Uzun Hasan by Sultan Mehmet II at the battle of Otlukbeli.

== Places of interest ==
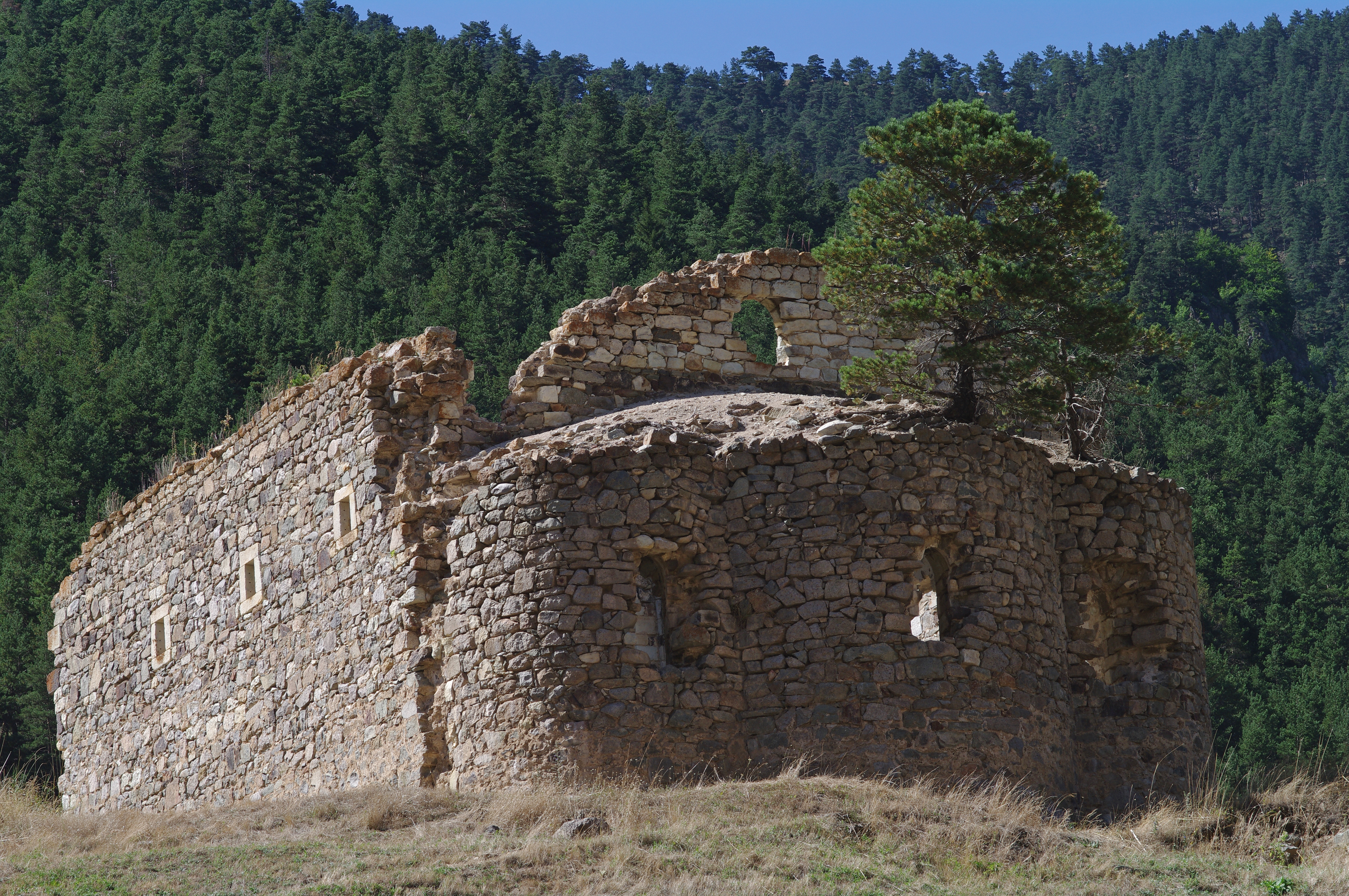
Çakrak church, formerly known as The Church of Theodoku of Kimisis, in Çakrak, Alucra.

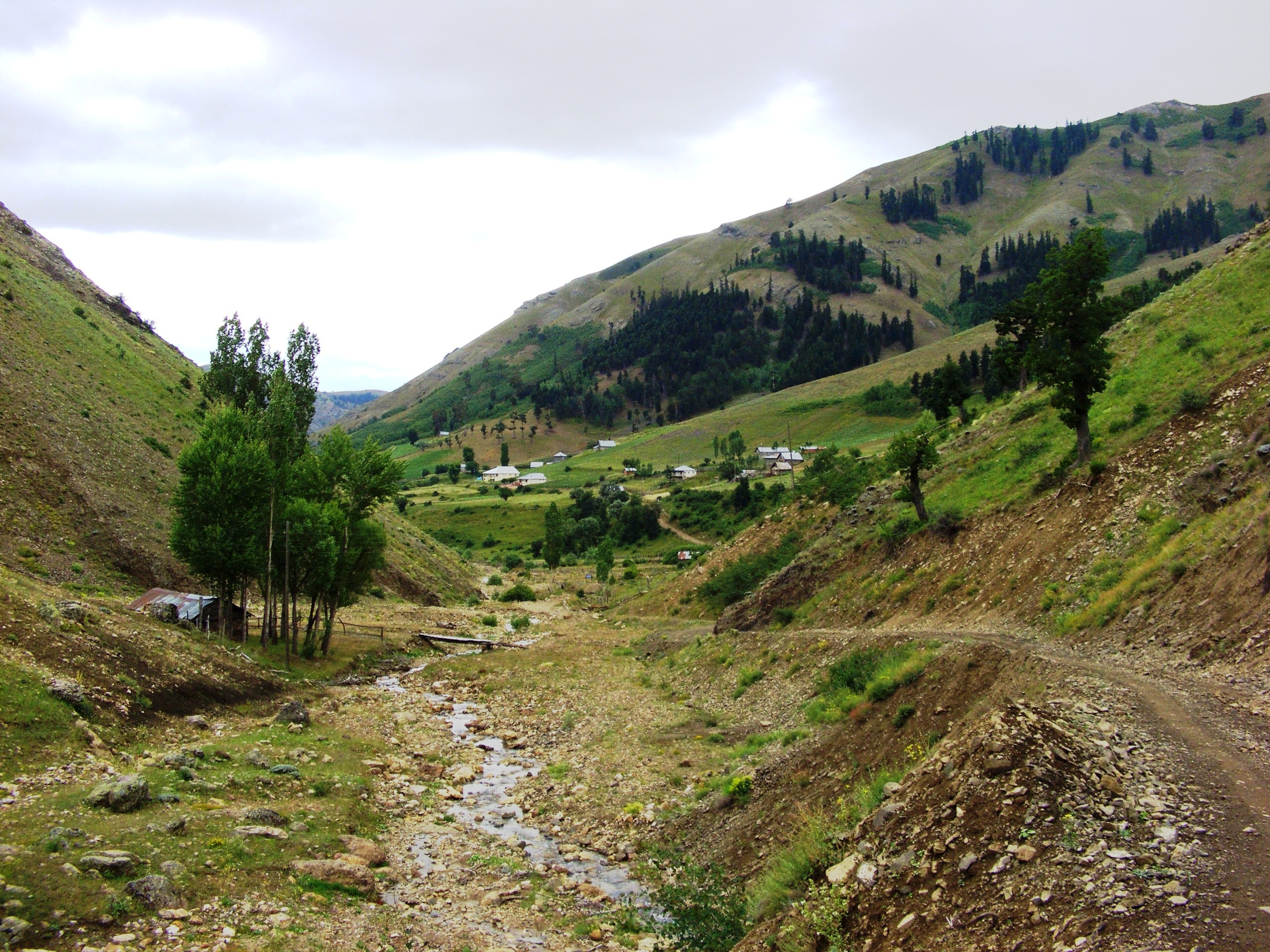
Elmacik, a village in Alucra District.

As well as walks in the high pastures (yayla), there are a number of historical sites:

- Kamışlı Kilisesi - a church in the village of Çakrak, built by Greeks in the 1800s
- Çakrak Kilisesi - a ruined church
- Gelinkaya (Bride's Rock - site of a gruesome local legend)
- Ikizler Tepesi - two hills near the village of Pirilli

== Notable people ==
- Photios of Korytsa (1862–1906), Greek Orthodox metropolitan bishop and martyr.
- Harun Karadeniz (1942–1975), Turkish political activist and author.
- Arif Şirin (1949–2019), Turkish folk musician, poet, composer, songwriter and bağlama teacher.
- Nurettin Canikli (b. 1960), Turkish politician and former minister.
- Hasan Bitmez (1969–2023), Turkish politician.
- Fazlı Teoman Yakupoğlu (b. 1967), Turkish acoustic rock singer and songwriter.
