= List of populated places in Giresun Province =

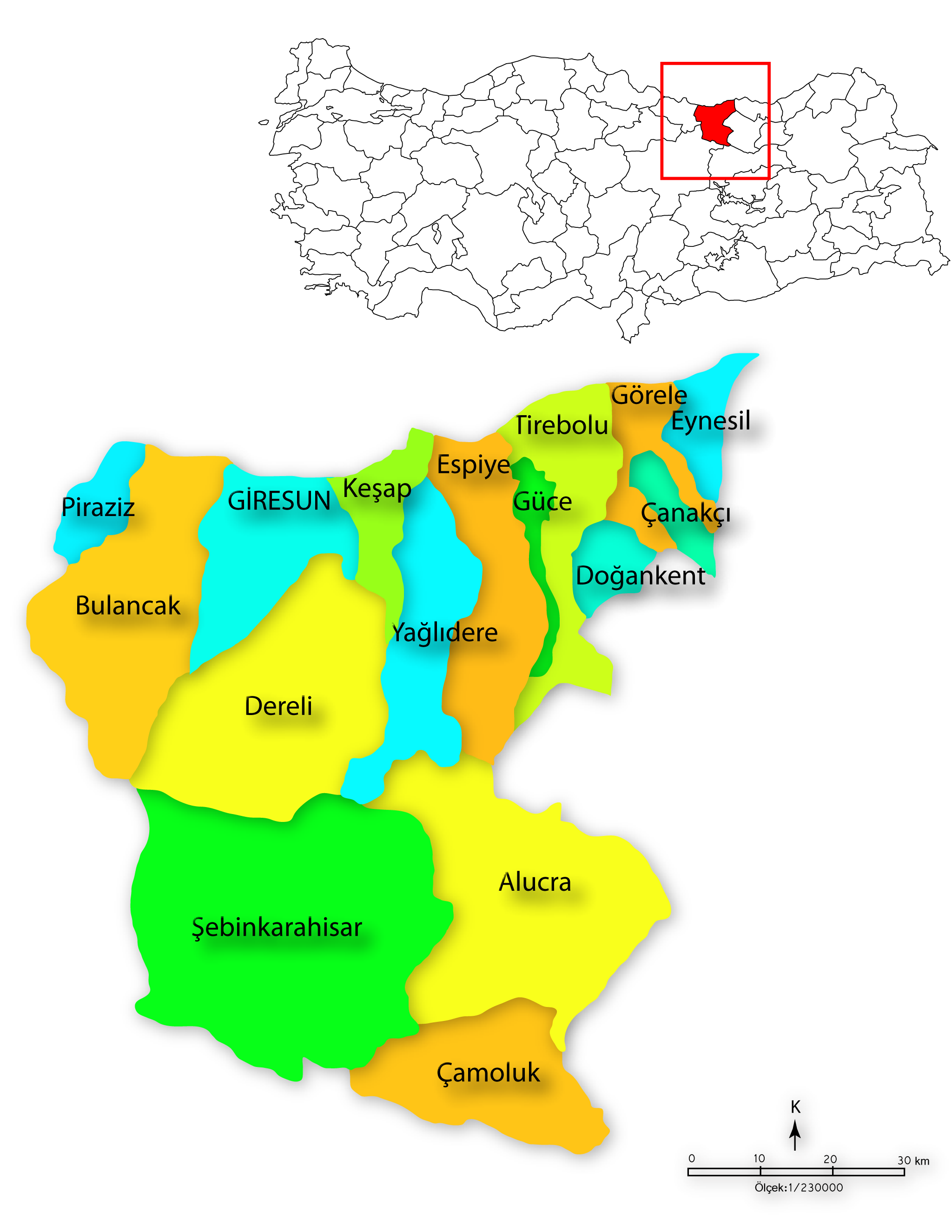
Giresun Province

Below is the list of populated places in Giresun Province, Turkey by the districts. In the following lists first place in each list is the administrative center of the district.

== Giresun ==
- Giresun
- Akçalı, Giresun
- Akıncı, Giresun
- Akköy, Giresun
- Alınca, Giresun
- Anbaralan, Giresun
- Barça, Giresun
- Barçaçakırlı, Giresun
- Bayazıt, Giresun
- Boztekke, Giresun
- Burhaniye, Giresun
- Camili, Giresun
- Çağlayan, Giresun
- Çaldağ, Giresun
- Çalış, Giresun
- Çamlık, Giresun
- Çandır, Giresun
- Çavuşoğlu, Giresun
- Çiçekli, Giresun
- Çukurköy, Giresun
- Darıköy, Giresun
- Duroğlu, Giresun
- Ergence, Giresun
- Eriklimanı, Giresun
- Esentepe, Giresun
- Evrenköy, Giresun
- Güney, Giresun
- Gürköy, Giresun
- Güveç, Giresun
- Hamidiye, Giresun
- Hisargeriş, Giresun
- İncegeriş, Giresun
- İnişdibi, Giresun
- Karaali, Giresun
- Kemaliye, Giresun
- Lapa, Giresun
- Mesudiye, Giresun
- Okçu, Giresun
- Orhaniye, Giresun
- Ortaköy, Giresun
- Pınarçukuru, Giresun
- Sarvan, Giresun
- Sayca, Giresun
- Seyitköy, Giresun
- Sıvacı, Giresun
- Uzgur, Giresun
- Uzkara, Giresun
- Ülper, Giresun
- Yağmurca, Giresun
- Yaykınlık, Giresun
- Yazlık, Giresun
- Yenicehisar, Giresun
- Yukarıalınlı, Giresun

== Alucra ==
- Alucra
- Akçiçek, Alucra
- Aktepe, Alucra
- Arda, Alucra
- Arduç, Alucra
- Armutlu, Alucra
- Aydınyayla, Alucra
- Bereketli, Alucra
- Beylerce, Alucra
- Boyluca, Alucra
- Fevzi Çakmak, Alucra
- Çakrak, Alucra
- Çalgan, Alucra
- Çamlıyayla, Alucra
- Demirözü, Alucra
- Dereçiftlik, Alucra
- Doludere, Alucra
- Elmacık, Alucra
- Gökçebel, Alucra
- Günügüzel, Alucra
- Gürbulak, Alucra
- Hacıhasan, Alucra
- Hacılı, Alucra
- İğdecik, Alucra
- Kabaktepe, Alucra
- Kaledibi, Alucra
- Kamışlı, Alucra
- Karabörk, Alucra
- Kavaklıdere, Alucra
- Koman, Alucra
- Konaklı, Alucra
- Köklüce, Alucra
- Pirili, Alucra
- Subaşı, Alucra
- Suyurdu, Alucra
- Tepeköy, Alucra
- Tohumluk, Alucra
- Yeşilyurt, Alucra
- Yükselen, Alucra

== Bulancak ==
- Bulancak
- Ahmetli, Bulancak
- Ahurlu, Bulancak
- Alibey, Bulancak
- Ardahan, Bulancak
- Arifli, Bulancak
- Ataköy, Bulancak
- Aydındere, Bulancak
- Bahçeli, Bulancak
- Bayındır, Bulancak
- Bostanlı, Bulancak
- Burunucu, Bulancak
- Büyükada, Bulancak
- Cindi, Bulancak
- Damudere, Bulancak
- Demircili, Bulancak
- Döngeri, Bulancak
- Duttepe, Bulancak
- Elmalı, Bulancak
- Erdoğan, Bulancak
- Eriklik, Bulancak
- Esenköy, Bulancak
- Ezeltere, Bulancak
- Gültepe, Bulancak
- Gündoğdu, Bulancak
- Güneyköy, Bulancak
- Güzelyurt, Bulancak
- Hacet, Bulancak
- Hisarkaya, Bulancak
- İcilli, Bulancak
- İnece, Bulancak
- Karaağaç, Bulancak
- Karacaresul, Bulancak
- Kayabaşı, Bulancak
- Kayadibi, Bulancak
- Kayhan, Bulancak
- Kışla, Bulancak
- Kovanlık, Bulancak
- Kuşluhan, Bulancak
- Kuzköy, Bulancak
- Küçükada, Bulancak
- Küçükdere, Bulancak
- Küçüklü, Bulancak
- Muratlı, Bulancak
- Odadüzü, Bulancak
- Pazarsuyu, Bulancak
- Samugüney, Bulancak
- Süme, Bulancak
- Şeyhmusa, Bulancak
- Talipli, Bulancak
- Tandır, Bulancak
- Tekmezar, Bulancak
- Tepecik, Bulancak
- Tepeören, Bulancak
- Tokmadin, Bulancak
- Torçan, Bulancak
- Yalıköy, Bulancak
- Yaslıbahçe, Bulancak
- Yeniköy, Bulancak
- Yeşilhisar, Bulancak
- Yeşilköy, Bulancak
- Yeşiltepe, Bulancak
- Yıldız, Bulancak
- Yunuslu, Bulancak

== Çamoluk ==
- Çamoluk
- Akyapı, Çamoluk
- Bayır, Çamoluk
- Çakılkaya, Çamoluk
- Daldibi, Çamoluk
- Eğnir, Çamoluk
- Fındıklı, Çamoluk
- Gücer, Çamoluk
- Gürçalı, Çamoluk
- Hacıahmetoğlu, Çamoluk
- Hacıören, Çamoluk
- Kaledere, Çamoluk
- Karadikmen, Çamoluk
- Kayacık, Çamoluk
- Kaynar, Çamoluk
- Kılıçtutan, Çamoluk
- Koçak, Çamoluk
- Kutluca, Çamoluk
- Okçaören, Çamoluk
- Ozan, Çamoluk
- Pınarlı, Çamoluk
- Sarpkaya, Çamoluk
- Taşcılar, Çamoluk
- Taşdemir, Çamoluk
- Usluca, Çamoluk
- Yenice, Çamoluk
- Yeniköy, Çamoluk
- Yusufeli, Çamoluk

== Çanakçı ==
- Çanakçı
- Akköy, Çanakçı
- Bakımlı, Çanakçı
- Çağlayan, Çanakçı
- Deregözü, Çanakçı
- Doğanköy, Çanakçı
- Düzköy, Çanakçı
- Egeköy, Çanakçı
- Erenköy, Çanakçı
- Kahraman, Çanakçı
- Kaledibi, Çanakçı
- Karabörk, Çanakçı
- Kuşköy, Çanakçı
- Sarayköy, Çanakçı
- Yeşilköy, Çanakçı

== Dereli ==
- Dereli
- Akkaya, Dereli
- Aksu, Dereli
- Alancık, Dereli
- Çalca, Dereli
- Çalköy, Dereli
- Çamlı, Dereli
- Çengelköy, Dereli
- Eğrianbar, Dereli
- Güdül, Dereli
- Güzelköy, Dereli
- Güzyurdu, Dereli
- Heydere, Dereli
- Hisarköy, Dereli
- İçmesu, Dereli
- Kızıltaş, Dereli
- Konuklu, Dereli
- Kurtulmuş, Dereli
- Küçükahmet, Dereli
- Küknarlı, Dereli
- Kümbet, Dereli
- Maden, Dereli
- Meşeliyatak, Dereli
- Pınarlar, Dereli
- Sarıyakup, Dereli
- Tamdere, Dereli
- Taşlıca, Dereli
- Tepeköy, Dereli
- Tepeküknarlı, Dereli
- Uzundere, Dereli
- Yavuzkemal, Dereli
- Yaylacık, Dereli
- Yeşilkaya, Dereli
- Yeşiltepe, Dereli
- Yeşilvadi, Dereli
- Yıldız, Dereli
- Yuva, Dereli
- Yüce, Dereli

== Doğankent ==
- Doğankent
- Çatak, Doğankent
- Çatalağaç, Doğankent
- Doymuş, Doğankent
- Güdül, Doğankent
- Güvenlik, Doğankent
- Kozköy, Doğankent
- Oyraca, Doğankent
- Söğütağzı, Doğankent
- Yeniköy, Doğankent

== Espiye ==
- Espiye
- Akkaya, Espiye
- Aralıcak, Espiye
- Arıdurak, Espiye
- Arpacık, Espiye
- Avluca, Espiye
- Bahçecik, Espiye
- Bayrambey, Espiye
- Çalkaya, Espiye
- Çepniköy, Espiye
- Demircili, Espiye
- Direkbükü, Espiye
- Ericek, Espiye
- Gebelli, Espiye
- Gülburnu, Espiye
- Gümüşdere, Espiye
- Güney, Espiye
- Güzelyurt, Espiye
- Hacıköy, Espiye
- Hacımahmutlu, Espiye
- İbrahimşeyh, Espiye
- Kaşdibi, Espiye
- Kurugeriş, Espiye
- Seydiköy, Espiye
- Soğukpınar, Espiye
- Şahinyuva, Espiye
- Taflancık, Espiye
- Tikence, Espiye
- Yeniköy, Espiye
- Yeşilköy, Espiye
- Yeşilyurt, Espiye

== Eynesil ==
- Eynesil
- Adaköy, Eynesil
- Aralık, Eynesil
- Balcılı, Eynesil
- Belen, Eynesil
- Çorapçılar, Eynesil
- Dereköy, Eynesil
- İshaklı, Eynesil
- Kekiktepe, Eynesil
- Kemaliye, Eynesil
- Kemerli, Eynesil
- Kösemen, Eynesil
- Ören, Eynesil
- Yarımca, Eynesil

== Görele ==
- Görele
- Akharman, Görele
- Aralıkoz, Görele
- Ardıç, Görele
- Ataköy, Görele
- Aydınlar, Görele
- Bayazıt, Görele
- Beşirli, Görele
- Boğalı, Görele
- Çatak, Görele
- Çatakkırı, Görele
- Çavuşlu, Görele
- Çiftlikköy, Görele
- Dayılı, Görele
- Dedeli, Görele
- Dereboyu, Görele
- Derekuşçulu, Görele
- Dikmen, Görele
- Esenli, Görele
- Esenyurt, Görele
- Eserli, Görele
- Gölbaşı, Görele
- Gülpınar, Görele
- Gültepe, Görele
- Güneyköy, Görele
- Güvendik, Görele
- Haydarlı, Görele
- İnanca, Görele
- İsmailbeyli, Görele
- Karaburun, Görele
- Karadere, Görele
- Kırıklı, Görele
- Koyunhamza, Görele
- Köprübaşı, Görele
- Köprübaşı, Görele
- Kuşçulu, Görele
- Maksutlu, Görele
- Menteşe, Görele
- Ortaköy, Görele
- Recepli, Görele
- Sağlık, Görele
- Seferli, Görele
- Soğukpınar, Görele
- Şahinyuva, Görele
- Şalaklı, Görele
- Şenlik, Görele
- Tekgöz, Görele
- Tepeköy, Görele
- Terziali, Görele
- Türkelli, Görele
- Yalıköy, Görele
- Yeğenli, Görele
- Yeşildere, Görele

== Güce ==
- Güce
- Akpınar, Güce
- Boncukçukur, Güce
- Dayıcık, Güce
- Düzçukur, Güce
- Fındıklı, Güce
- Fırınlı, Güce
- Gürağaç, Güce
- İlit, Güce
- Kuluncak, Güce
- Sarıyar, Güce
- Soğukpınar, Güce
- Örnekköy, Güce
- Ergenekon, Güce
- Tekkeköy, Güce
- Yukarıboynuyoğun, Güce

== Keşap ==
- Keşap
- Alataş, Keşap
- Altınpınar, Keşap
- Armutdüzü, Keşap
- Arnavut, Keşap
- Balıklısu, Keşap
- Bayrambey, Keşap
- Bayramşah, Keşap
- Ceylanpınar, Keşap
- Çakırlı, Keşap
- Çamlıca, Keşap
- Değirmenağzı, Keşap
- Demirci, Keşap
- Dokuztepe, Keşap
- Düzköy, Keşap
- Erköy, Keşap
- Geçit, Keşap
- Gönüllü, Keşap
- Güneyköy, Keşap
- Gürpınar, Keşap
- Halkalı, Keşap
- Harmandarlı, Keşap
- Hisarüstü, Keşap
- Karabulduk, Keşap
- Karadere, Keşap
- Karaishak, Keşap
- Karakoç, Keşap
- Kaşaltı, Keşap
- Kayabaşı, Keşap
- Kılıçlı, Keşap
- Kirazlı, Keşap
- Kurbanpınarı, Keşap
- Küçükgeriş, Keşap
- Sancaklıtepe, Keşap
- Saraycık, Keşap
- Sayca, Keşap
- Sürmenli, Keşap
- Taflancık, Keşap
- Tepeköy, Keşap
- Töngel, Keşap
- Yazlık, Keşap
- Yivdincik, Keşap
- Yolağzı, Keşap
- Yolbaşı, Keşap
- Yünlüce, Keşap

== Piraziz ==
- Piraziz
- Akçay, Piraziz
- Alidede, Piraziz
- Armutçukuru, Piraziz
- Balçıklı, Piraziz
- Bozat, Piraziz
- Bülbüllü, Piraziz
- Çağlandere, Piraziz
- Çayırköy, Piraziz
- Esentepe, Piraziz
- Gökçeali, Piraziz
- Güneyköy, Piraziz
- Hasanşeyh, Piraziz
- Kılıçlı, Piraziz
- Narlık, Piraziz
- Örnekköy, Piraziz
- Piraziz, Piraziz
- Şerefli, Piraziz
- Tepeköy, Piraziz
- Yunusemre, Piraziz

== Şebinkarahisar ==
- Şebinkarahisar
- Ahurcuk, Şebinkarahisar
- Akviran, Şebinkarahisar
- Alişar, Şebinkarahisar
- Altınçevre, Şebinkarahisar
- Altınova, Şebinkarahisar
- Arslanşah, Şebinkarahisar
- Asarcık, Şebinkarahisar
- Bayhasan, Şebinkarahisar
- Bayramköy, Şebinkarahisar
- Buzkeçi, Şebinkarahisar
- Çağlayan, Şebinkarahisar
- Çakır, Şebinkarahisar
- Çamlıbel, Şebinkarahisar
- Dereköy, Şebinkarahisar
- Diler, Şebinkarahisar
- Doğanyuva, Şebinkarahisar
- Dönençay, Şebinkarahisar
- Duman, Şebinkarahisar
- Ekecek, Şebinkarahisar
- Erentepe, Şebinkarahisar
- Esentepe, Şebinkarahisar
- Evcili, Şebinkarahisar
- Gökçetaş, Şebinkarahisar
- Güneygören, Şebinkarahisar
- Gürpınar, Şebinkarahisar
- Güvercinlik, Şebinkarahisar
- Güzelyurt, Şebinkarahisar
- Hacıömer, Şebinkarahisar
- Hasanşeyh, Şebinkarahisar
- Hocaoğlu, Şebinkarahisar
- Karaağaç, Şebinkarahisar
- Karacaören, Şebinkarahisar
- Kayalı, Şebinkarahisar
- Kınık, Şebinkarahisar
- Konak, Şebinkarahisar
- Ocaktaşı, Şebinkarahisar
- Ovacık, Şebinkarahisar
- Ozanlı, Şebinkarahisar
- Örencik, Şebinkarahisar
- Saraycık, Şebinkarahisar
- Sarıyer, Şebinkarahisar
- Sipahi, Şebinkarahisar
- Suboyu, Şebinkarahisar
- Sultankonağı, Şebinkarahisar
- Şahinler, Şebinkarahisar
- Şaplıca, Şebinkarahisar
- Taşcılı, Şebinkarahisar
- Tekkaya, Şebinkarahisar
- Tepeltepe, Şebinkarahisar
- Tokluağıl, Şebinkarahisar
- Toplukonak, Şebinkarahisar
- Tönük, Şebinkarahisar
- Turpçu, Şebinkarahisar
- Uğurca, Şebinkarahisar
- Yakınca, Şebinkarahisar
- Yaycı, Şebinkarahisar
- Yedikardeş, Şebinkarahisar
- Yeniyol, Şebinkarahisar
- Yeşilyayla, Şebinkarahisar
- Yeşilyurt, Şebinkarahisar
- Yıltarıç, Şebinkarahisar
- Yumurcaktaş, Şebinkarahisar

== Tirebolu ==
- Tirebolu
- Akıncılar, Tirebolu
- Arageriş, Tirebolu
- Arslancık, Tirebolu
- Aşağıboynuyoğun, Tirebolu
- Ataköy, Tirebolu
- Avcılı, Tirebolu
- Balçıkbelen, Tirebolu
- Belen, Tirebolu
- Civil, Tirebolu
- Çamlıköy, Tirebolu
- Çeğel, Tirebolu
- Danışman, Tirebolu
- Doğancı, Tirebolu
- Dokuzkonak, Tirebolu
- Düzköy, Tirebolu
- Ede, Tirebolu
- Eymür, Tirebolu
- Fatih, Tirebolu
- Hacıhüseyin, Tirebolu
- Halaçlı, Tirebolu
- Harkköy, Tirebolu
- Işıklı, Tirebolu
- İğnece, Tirebolu
- Karaahmetli, Tirebolu
- Karademir, Tirebolu
- Kayalar, Tirebolu
- Ketençukur, Tirebolu
- Kovancık, Tirebolu
- Kovanpınar, Tirebolu
- Köseler, Tirebolu
- Kuskunlu, Tirebolu
- Kuzgun, Tirebolu
- Menderes, Tirebolu
- Mursal, Tirebolu
- Ortacami, Tirebolu
- Ortaköy, Tirebolu
- Örenkaya, Tirebolu
- Özlü, Tirebolu
- Sekü, Tirebolu
- Sultanköy, Tirebolu
- Şenyuva, Tirebolu
- Şirin, Tirebolu
- Yağlıkuyumcu, Tirebolu
- Yalç, Tirebolu
- Yalıköy, Tirebolu
- Yaraş, Tirebolu
- Yeşilpınar, Tirebolu
- Yılgın, Tirebolu
- Yukarıboğalı, Tirebolu
- Yukarıortacami, Tirebolu

== Yağlıdere ==
- Yağlıdere
- Akdarı, Yağlıdere
- Akköy, Yağlıdere
- Akpınar, Yağlıdere
- Dereköy, Yağlıdere
- Derindere, Yağlıdere
- Elmabelen, Yağlıdere
- Güllüce, Yağlıdere
- Hisarcık, Yağlıdere
- Kanlıca, Yağlıdere
- Koçlu, Yağlıdere
- Küçükköy, Yağlıdere
- Ortaköy, Yağlıdere
- Oruçbey, Yağlıdere
- Ömerli, Yağlıdere
- Sınırköy, Yağlıdere
- Sinanlı, Yağlıdere
- Tekkeköy, Yağlıdere
- Tuğlacık, Yağlıdere
- Üçtepe, Yağlıdere
- Ümütbükü, Yağlıdere
- Yazlık, Yağlıdere
- Yeniakköy, Yağlıdere
- Yenice, Yağlıdere
- Yeniyazlık, Yağlıdere
- Yeşilpınar, Yağlıdere
- Yeşilyurt, Yağlıdere
