= Balcılı, Eynesil =

Balcılı
- Village
- Location in Turkey
- Coordinates: 40.9844°N 39.1078°E
- Country: Turkey
- Province: Giresun
- District: Eynesil
- Population (2023): 291
- Time zone: UTC+3 (TRT)

Balcılı is a village in the Eynesil District of Giresun province. The village is 92 kilometres (57 mi) from Giresun city center and 17 kilometres (11 mi) from Eynesil district center.

== Population ==
Historical population
Year	Pop.	±% p.a.
1965	596	—
1985	614	+0.15%
1990	525	−3.08%
1997	348	−5.71%
2007	289	−1.84%
2012	268	−1.50%
2017	259	−0.68%
2023	291	+1.96%
Source: Population censuses (1965-1997) and TÜİK (2007-2023)
