= Çalış, Görele =

Çalış
- Village
- Location in Turkey
- Coordinates: 40°58′56″N 39°05′28″E
- Country: Turkey
- Province: Giresun
- District: Görele
- Population (2021): 129
- Time zone: UTC+3 (TRT)

Çalış is a village in the Görele District of Giresun Province, Turkey. The village is 78 km from Giresun city center and 18 km from Görele district center.

== Population ==
Population by years
2021	129
2020	127
2019	128
2018	160
2017	142
2016	147
2015	133
2014	182
2012	361
2011	314
2010	266
2009	292
2008	232
2007	340
1990	44
1985	472
1965	514
