= Görele District =

District of Giresun Province, Turkey

- District
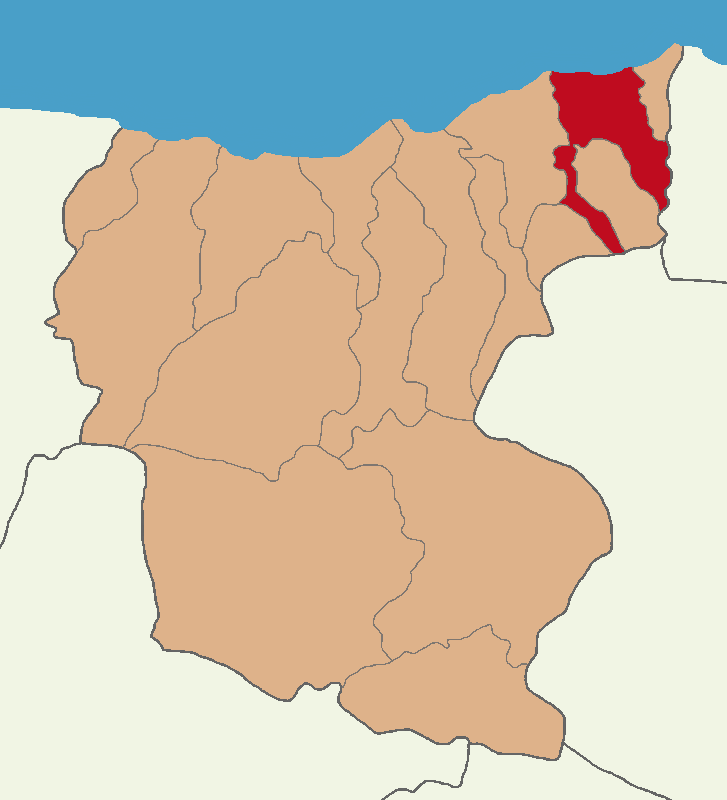
- Map showing Görele District in Giresun Province

- Location in Turkey
- Coordinates: 41°00′N 39°02′E
- Country: Turkey
- Province: Giresun
- Seat: Görele

Government
  - Kaymakam: Cem Afşin Akbay
- Area: 237 km^{2} (92 sq mi)
- Population (2022): 30,973
  - Density: 130/km^{2} (340/sq mi)
- Time zone: UTC+3 (TRT)
- Website: www.gorele.gov.tr

Görele District is a district of the Giresun Province of Turkey. Its seat is the town of Görele. Its area is 237 km^{2}, and its population is 30,973 (2022).

== Geography ==
The district is mainly mountainous and watered by streams and rivers running into the Black Sea, the highest peaks are Mount Sis and Haç (Haş). Up to 600m the hillsides are covered with hazelnuts, along with alder, poplars and other deciduous trees. The agriculture of the district is mainly hazelnuts along with some tea planting, beekeeping, and gardening for domestic consumption, while the higher elevations are forest and pasture.

Recently trout farming has begun in the mountain waterways. The high pasture lands have begun to attract visitors on trekking holidays. Traditionally in this part of the world people would move their sheep and cattle to the high pastures (yayla) for summer grazing and today this has become something of an event with summer folklore festivals in places like Sis Dağı attracting visitors from all over Turkey, who come to hear the Kemençe and watch people dance the Horon. The sale of local costumes and craftwork such as wooden toys and woven goods bring extra income to the district.

The climate is typical of the Black Sea region; it rains in every season and in the high mountains it snows in winter. The mountain hinterland is hard to access, with many dirt roads and the villages are continuously shrinking as the villagers migrate to Turkey's larger cities in search of work.

== Composition ==
There are two municipalities in Görele District:

- Çavuşlu
- Görele

There are 62 villages in Görele District:

- Akharman
- Aralıkoz
- Ardıç
- Ataköy
- Aydınlar
- Bayazıt
- Beşirli
- Boğalı
- Burunucu
- Çalış
- Çatak
- Çatakkırı
- Çiftlikköy
- Dayılı
- Dedeli
- Dereboyu
- Derekuşçulu
- Dikmen
- Esenli
- Esenyurt
- Eserli
- Gölbaşı
- Gülpınar
- Gültepe
- Güneyköy
- Güvendik
- Hamzalı
- Haydarlı
- İnanca
- İsmailbeyli
- Kaleköy
- Karaburun
- Karadere
- Karakeş
- Karlıbel
- Kaynar
- Kıdır
- Kırıklı
- Köprübaşı
- Koyunhamza
- Kuşçulu
- Maksutlu
- Menteşe
- Önerli
- Ortaköy
- Recepli
- Şafaklı
- Sağlık
- Şahinyuva
- Seferli
- Şenlik
- Sofulu
- Soğukpınar
- Taşlık
- Tekgöz
- Tepeköy
- Terziali
- Türkelli
- Umutlu
- Yalıköy
- Yeğenli
- Yeşildere
