= Adaköy, Eynesil =

Adaköy
- Village
- Location in Turkey
- Coordinates: 40°59′47″N 39°05′50″E
- Country: Turkey
- Province: Giresun
- District: Eynesil
- Population (2023): 160
- Time zone: UTC+3 (TRT)

Adaköy is a village in the Eynesil District of Giresun Province, Turkey. Population 160 (2023).

The village is 93 km from Giresun city center and 18 km from Eynesil district center. The village is located in the southwest of Eynesil and reaches the Giresun-Trabzon (Görele-Eynesil) state/numbered Giresun-Trabzon (Görele-Eynesil) state/international road from the Yalakoda Creek Valley via a 10.4 km. village road in Çavuşlu town of Görele.
