= Güvenlik Tunnel =

Tunnel in Doğankent, Giresun, Turkey

Güvenlik Tunnel Güvenlik Tüneli
- Interactive map of Güvenlik Tunnel; Güvenlik Tüneli

Overview
- Location: Doğankent, Giresun Province, Turkey
- Coordinates: 40.7823°N 38.9374°E Location of Güvenlik Tunnel in Turkey
- Status: Operational
- Route: D.877

Operation
- Opened: 2008
- Operator: General Directorate of Highways
- Traffic: automotive

Technical
- Length: 1,835 m (6,020 ft)
- No. of lanes: 2 x 1

The Güvenlik Tunnel (Turkish: Güvenlik Tüneli) is a road tunnel constructed on the Tirebolu–Gümüşhane state highway D.877 in Giresun Province, northeastern Turkey. It was opened to traffic in 2008.

Situated near Güvenlik village of Doğankent district in Giresun Province on the route to Kürtün, Gümüşhane, the 1,835 m (6,020 ft)-long tunnel carries one lane of traffic in each direction in one tube. The tunnel enables an easy access between Black Sea Region to Eastern Anatolia region through the Pontic Mountains.
