= Kemerli, Eynesil =

Kemerli
- Village
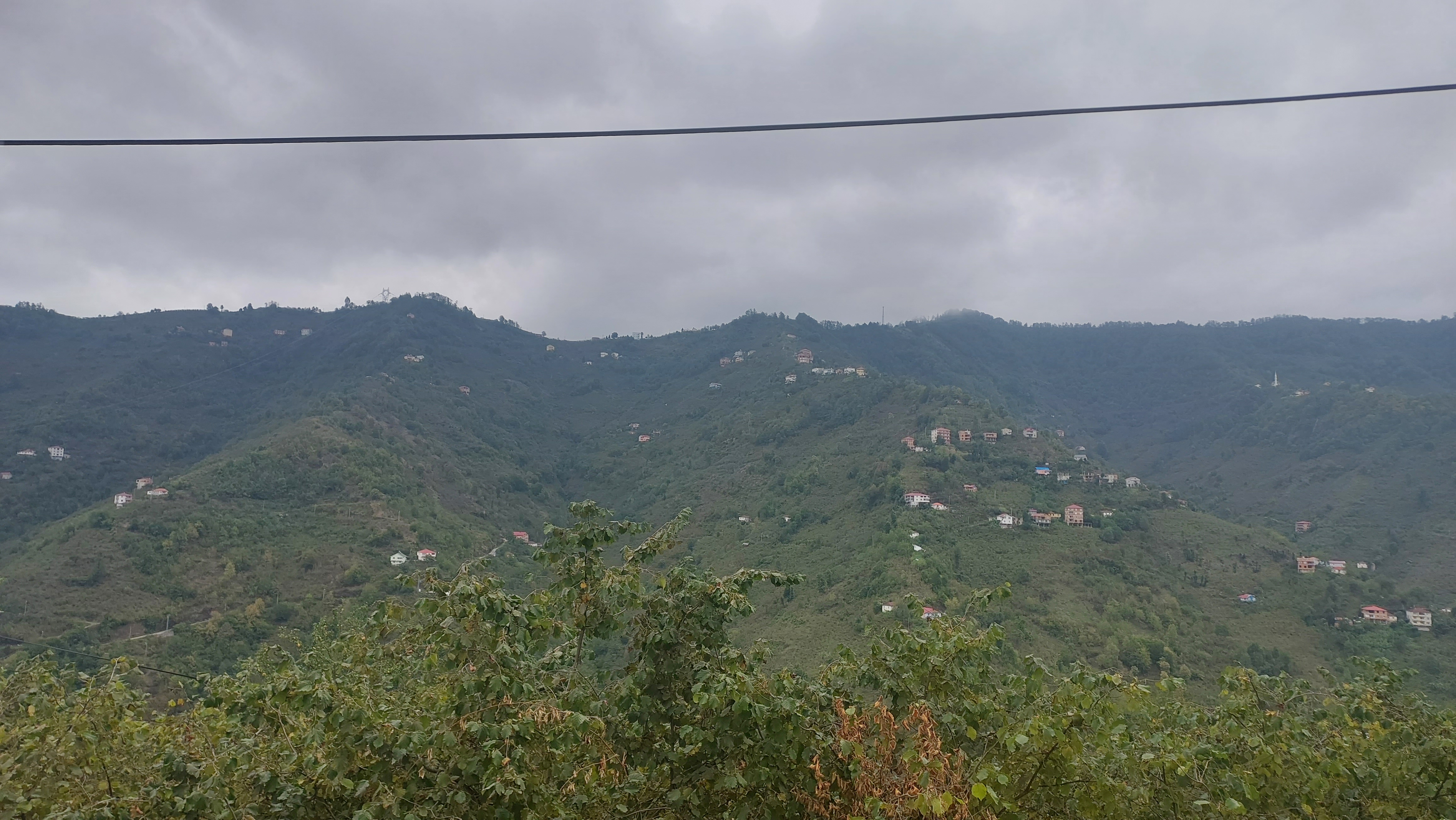

- Location within Turkey
- Coordinates: 40°59′54″N 39°06′13″E
- Country: Turkey
- Province: Giresun
- District: Eynesil
- Population (2023): 335
- Time zone: UTC+3 (TRT)

Kemerli is a village in the Eynesil District of Giresun Province, Turkey. The village is 90 km from Giresun city center and 15 km from Eynesil district center.

== Population ==
Historical population
Year	Pop.	±% p.a.
1965	1,026	—
1985	973	−0.26%
1990	843	−2.83%
1997	398	−10.17%
2007	359	−1.03%
2012	328	−1.79%
2017	279	−3.18%
2023	335	+3.10%
Source: Population censuses (1965-1997) and TÜİK (2007-2023)
