= Çorapçılar, Eynesil =

Çorapçılar
- Village
- Location in Turkey
- Coordinates: 41.0539°N 39.1693°E
- Country: Turkey
- Province: Giresun
- District: Eynesil
- Population (2023): 181
- Time zone: UTC+3 (TRT)

Çorapçılar is a village in the Eynesil District of Giresun province. The village was formerly mentioned as Vamenli.

== Population ==
Historical population
Year	Pop.	±% p.a.
1965	564	—
1985	541	−0.21%
1990	455	−3.40%
1997	268	−7.28%
2007	295	+0.96%
2012	328	+2.14%
2017	256	−4.84%
2023	181	−5.61%
Source: Population censuses (1965-1997) and TÜİK (2007-2023)
