= Kemaliye, Eynesil =

Kemaliye
- Village
- Location in Turkey
- Coordinates: 40.9700°N 39.1282°E
- Country: Turkey
- Province: Giresun
- District: Eynesil
- Population (2021): 242
- Time zone: UTC+3 (TRT)

Kemaliye is a village in the Eynesil District of Giresun province. The old name of the village is mentioned as 'Göceli'.

== Population ==
Population by years
2021	242
2020	233
2019	224
2018	249
2017	210
2016	209
2015	215
2014	218
2013	216
2012	216
2011	230
2010	236
2009	245
2008	258
2007	250
2000	281
1990	490
1985	587
1965	495
