= Çamoluk District =

District of Giresun Province, Turkey

- District
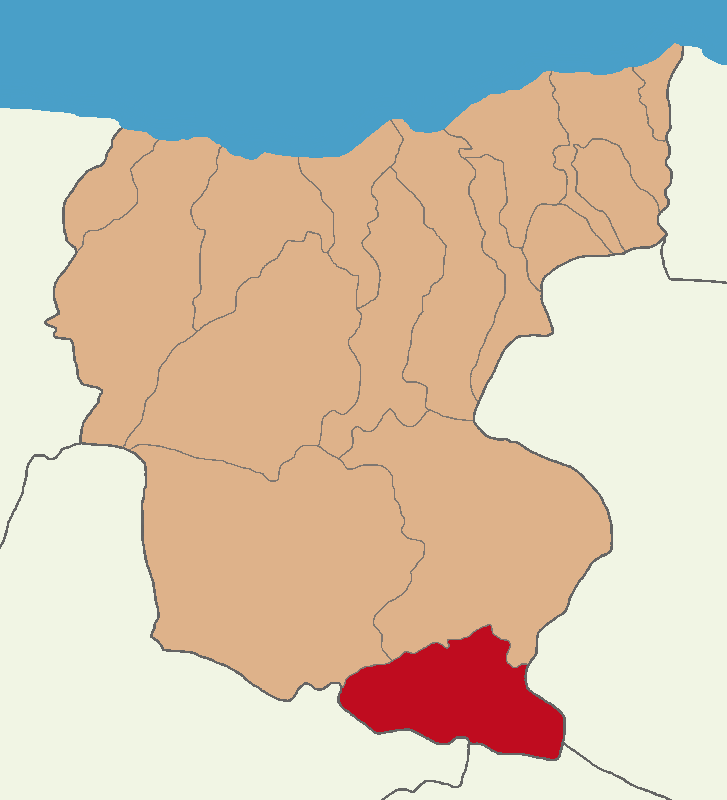
- Map showing Çamoluk District in Giresun Province

- Location in Turkey
- Coordinates: 40°08′N 38°44′E
- Country: Turkey
- Province: Giresun
- Seat: Çamoluk

Government
  - Kaymakam: Furkan Berber
- Area: 444 km^{2} (171 sq mi)
- Population (2022): 6,469
  - Density: 15/km^{2} (38/sq mi)
- Time zone: UTC+3 (TRT)
- Website: www.camoluk.gov.tr

Çamoluk District is a district of the Giresun Province of Turkey. Its seat is the town of Çamoluk. Its area is 444 km^{2}, and its population is 6,469 (2022).

== Composition ==
There is one municipality in Çamoluk District:

- Çamoluk

There are 27 villages in Çamoluk District:

- Akyapı
- Bayır
- Çakılkaya
- Daldibi
- Eğnir
- Fındıklı
- Gücer
- Gürçalı
- Hacıahmetoğlu
- Hacıören
- Kaledere
- Karadikmen
- Kayacık
- Kaynar
- Kılıçtutan
- Koçak
- Kutluca
- Okçaören
- Ozanköy
- Pınarlı
- Sarpkaya
- Taşçılar
- Taşdemir
- Usluca
- Yenice
- Yeniköy
- Yusufeli
