= Doğankent =

- Municipality
- Location within Turkey
- Coordinates: 40°48′27″N 38°55′2″E
- Country: Turkey
- Province: Giresun
- District: Doğankent

Government
  - Mayor: Rüşan Özden (AKP)
- Elevation: 190 m (620 ft)
- Population (2022): 4,545
- Time zone: UTC+3 (TRT)
- Postal code: 28510
- Area code: 0454
- Climate: Cfa
- Website: www.dogankent.bel.tr

Doğankent is a town in Giresun Province in the Black Sea region of Turkey. It is the seat of Doğankent District. Its population is 4,545 (2022).

== Geography ==
Doğankent is a hilly district in the valley of the Harşit. The climate is typical of the Black Sea region, with much rain, summer and winter. Doğankent provides high schools and other basic amenities to the surrounding villages.

== Etymology ==
Previously known as Kürtün-ü Zir, Manastır Bükü and Harşit.

== History ==
There was a monastery here in the Byzantine period, hence the earlier name. The area was settled by Seljuk Turks following their victory over the Byzantines at the Battle of Malazgirt and was then absorbed into the Ottoman Empire in 1461 by Sultan Mehmet II during his conquest of the rump-Byzantine Empire of Trebizond. The areas importance as a centre of education persisted as the monasteries were converted into Islamic medrese.

== See also ==
- Güvenlik Tunnel
