= Keşap District =

District of Giresun Province, Turkey

- District
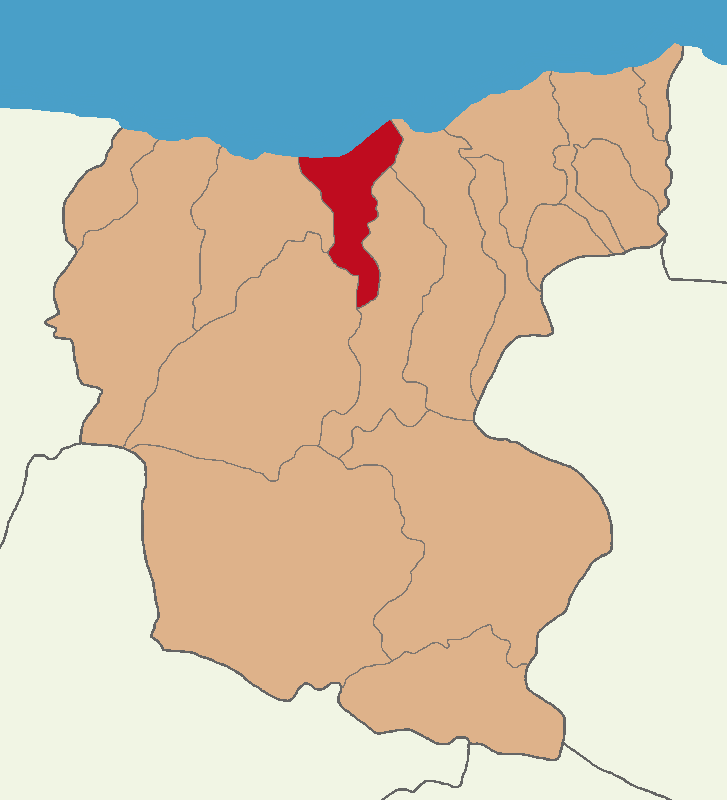
- Map showing Keşap District in Giresun Province

- Location in Turkey
- Coordinates: 40°55′N 38°31′E
- Country: Turkey
- Province: Giresun
- Seat: Keşap

Government
  - Kaymakam: Nurullah Cemil Erciyas
- Area: 197 km^{2} (76 sq mi)
- Population (2022): 19,596
  - Density: 99/km^{2} (260/sq mi)
- Time zone: UTC+3 (TRT)
- Website: www.kesap.gov.tr

Keşap District is a district of the Giresun Province of Turkey. Its seat is the town of Keşap. Its area is 197 km^{2}, and its population is 19,596 (2022).

== Composition ==
There is one municipality in Keşap District:

- Keşap

There are 44 villages in Keşap District:

- Alataş
- Altınpınar
- Armutdüzü
- Arnavut
- Balıklısu
- Bayrambey
- Bayramşah
- Ceylanpınar
- Çakırlı
- Çamlıca
- Demirci
- Dokuztepe
- Düzköy
- Erköy
- Geçitköy
- Gönüllü
- Güneyköy
- Gürpınar
- Halkalı
- Harmandalı
- Hisarüstü
- Karabulduk
- Karadere
- Karaishak
- Karakoç
- Kaşaltı
- Kayabaşı
- Kılıçlı
- Kirazlı
- Kurbanpınarı
- Küçükgeriş
- Sancaklıtepe
- Saraycık
- Sayca
- Sürmenli
- Taflancık
- Tepeköy
- Töngel
- Unaca
- Yazlık
- Yivdincik
- Yolağzı
- Yolbaşı
- Yünlüce
