= Karabörk =

- Village
- Location within Turkey
- Coordinates: 40°53′N 39°02′E
- Country: Turkey
- Province: Giresun
- District: Çanakçı
- Elevation: 310 m (1,020 ft)
- Population (2022): 745
- Time zone: UTC+3 (TRT)
- Postal code: 28815
- Area code: 0454

Karabörk is a village in Çanakçı District of Giresun Province, Turkey. Its population is 745 (2022). Between 1992 and the 2013 reorganisation, it was a town (belde). It is situated in the valley of Çanakçı creek, in the middle of dense forestry of the Black Sea Region. The distance to Çanakçı is 17 kilometres (11 mi) and to Giresun is 85 kilometres (53 mi). In Karabörk the Ottoman rule began by 1461 during the reign of Mehmet II (the conqueror). According to 1515 Ottoman records, it was a small settlement population of which was composed of Turks and Greeks. In the early 1700s, Turks of Çepni tribe also settled in the settlement. Ottomans mined copper in the Kırtlak mine close to Karabörk. In the early 20th century, Greek population left the settlement and during the First World War, the town suffered a brief occupation of the Russian army.
