= Eynesil District =

District of Giresun Province, Turkey

- District
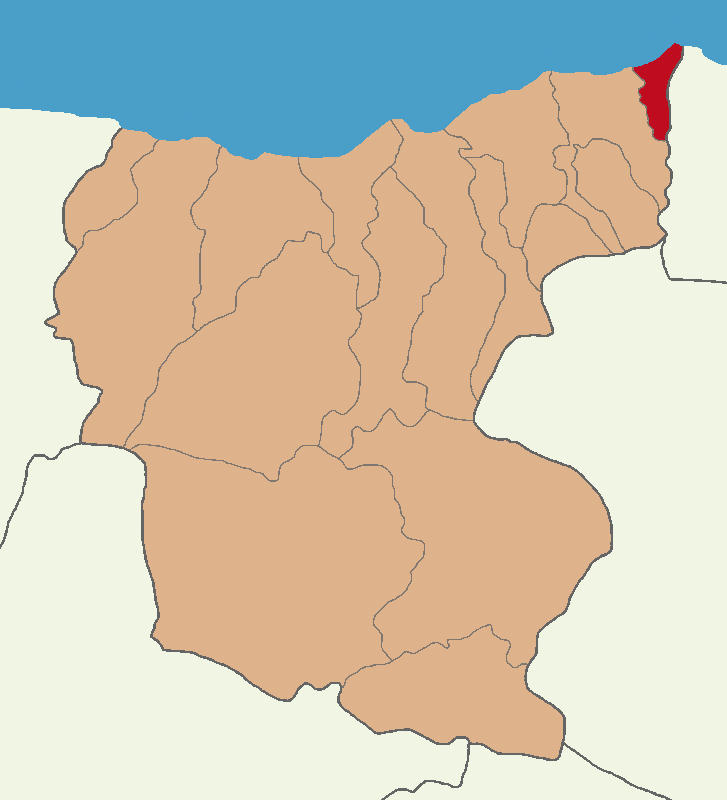
- Map showing Eynesil District in Giresun Province

- Location in Turkey
- Coordinates: 41°02′N 39°08′E
- Country: Turkey
- Province: Giresun
- Seat: Eynesil

Government
  - Kaymakam: Abdulselam Bıçak
- Area: 51 km^{2} (20 sq mi)
- Population (2022): 12,471
  - Density: 240/km^{2} (630/sq mi)
- Time zone: UTC+3 (TRT)
- Website: www.eynesil.gov.tr

Eynesil District is a district of the Giresun Province of Turkey. Its seat is the town of Eynesil. Its area is 51 km^{2}, and its population is 12,471 (2022).

== Geography ==
This is a low-lying coastal strip with steep hills behind. The views are breathtaking but life is hard in the hill country, while hazelnuts and tea are grown in the lower land near the coast, along with vegetables and a cow or two in the family garden. Fishing is another source of income although the harbour at Eynesil is small and limiting. The only industry is tea-processing and Eynesil is therefore not a wealthy district and many people have migrated away to jobs in Turkey's larger cities or abroad.

== Composition ==
There are two municipalities in Eynesil District:

- Eynesil
- Ören

There are 11 villages in Eynesil District:

- Adaköy
- Aralık
- Balcılı
- Çorapçılar
- Dereköy
- İshaklı
- Kekiktepe
- Kemaliye
- Kemerli
- Kösemen
- Yarımca
