= Çamoluk =

- Municipality
- Logo

- Location within Turkey
- Coordinates: 40°08′N 38°44′E
- Country: Turkey
- Province: Giresun
- District: Çamoluk

Government
  - Mayor: Ergün Bakirhan (AKP)
- Elevation: 1,140 m (3,740 ft)
- Population (2022): 2,985
- Time zone: UTC+3 (TRT)
- Postal code: 28710
- Area code: 0454
- Climate: Csb
- Website: www.camoluk.bel.tr

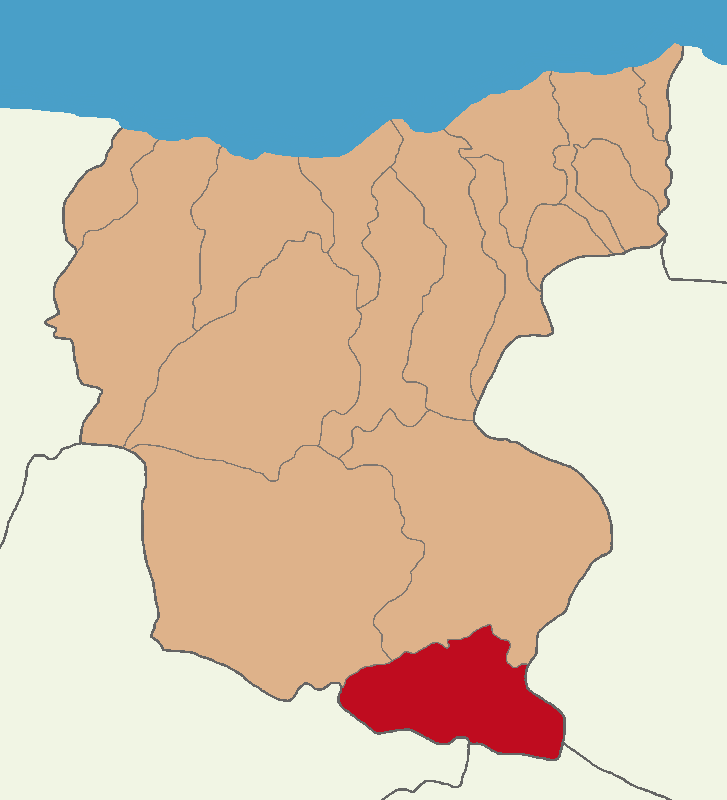

Çamoluk is a town in Giresun Province in the Black Sea region of Turkey. It is the seat of Çamoluk District. Its population is 2,985 (2022).

Being 180 km inland, in a valley of the upper Kelkit River, Çamoluk is different in landscape, climate and lifestyle from the city of Giresun and the other districts on the Black Sea coast.

== History ==
The valley of the Kelkit has been a passage to the Black Sea coast for thousands of years, was once part of the Roman Empire and from 381 the succeeding Byzantine Empire. Arab invaders occupied the valley in 778 followed by early settlements of the Oghuz Turks. Fighting between Turks and Byzantines continued in this corner of Anatolia for centuries, beyond the arrival of the Seljuk Turkish armies of Toğrül Bey in 1058, and the foundation of the Empire of Trebizond of which Çamoluk was part. The castle was built by the Trapezuntines in 1204 to defend the valley from further waves of Seljuk invaders.

In 1464 Sultan Mehmet II of the Ottoman Empire came down the valley in his campaign against Şebinkarahisar and Çamoluk was brought within the Empire.

== External districts ==
- (in Turkish) mayor website
- (in Turkish) çamoluk
- (in Turkish) local information
- (in Turkish) and more*
