= Doğankent District =

District of Giresun Province, Turkey

- District
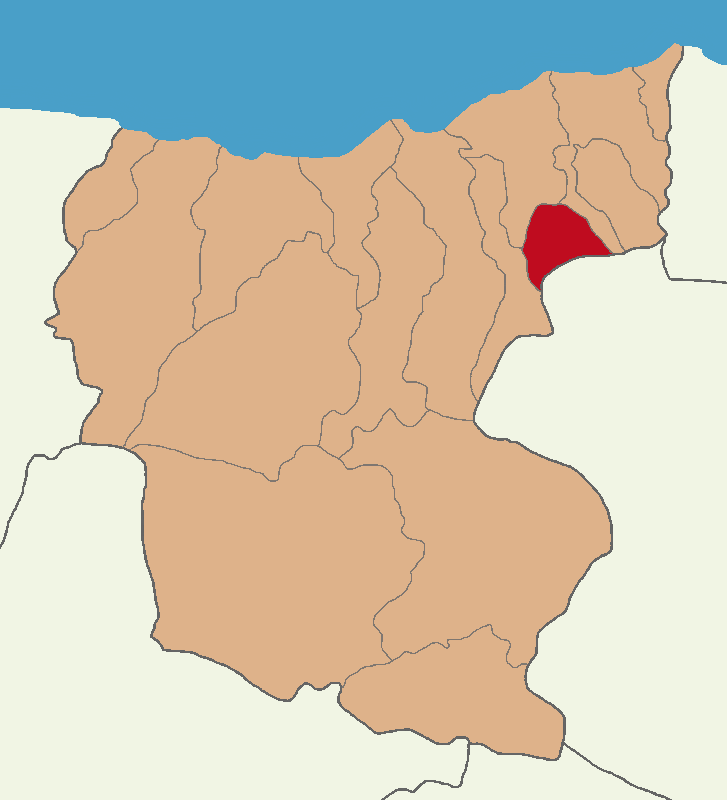
- Map showing Doğankent District in Giresun Province

- Location in Turkey
- Coordinates: 40°48′N 38°55′E
- Country: Turkey
- Province: Giresun
- Seat: Doğankent

Government
  - Kaymakam: Mustafa Mücahit Ayan
- Area: 110 km^{2} (40 sq mi)
- Population (2022): 6,715
  - Density: 61/km^{2} (160/sq mi)
- Time zone: UTC+3 (TRT)
- Website: www.dogankent.gov.tr

Doğankent District is a district of the Giresun Province of Turkey. Its seat is the town of Doğankent. Its area is 110 km^{2}, and its population is 6,715 (2022).

== Composition ==
There is one municipality in Doğankent District:

- Doğankent

There are 9 villages in Doğankent District:

- Çatak
- Çatalağaç
- Doymuş
- Güdül
- Güvenlik
- Kozköy
- Oyraca
- Söğütağzı
- Yeniköy
