= Turkish bird language =

Whistled version of the Turkish language

Voice of America report on the language, January 2018

Turkish bird language (Turkish: kuş dili) is a version of the Turkish language communicated through high-pitched whistles and melodies. It was originally used by Turkish farmers to communicate over large distances, and is now down to 10,000 speakers. The language is associated with Kuşköy, a village in northern Turkey's Giresun Province that has hosted a Bird Language, Culture and Art Festival annually since 1997. The language dates back 400 years, but the origin is still uncertain. UNESCO included the bird language in its 2017 list of Intangible Cultural Heritage. Other countries with whistled languages include Greece, Mexico, and Mozambique.

== Endangerment causes ==
The use of cellphones has eliminated the primary utilization of kuş dili. Since the town of Kuşköy is a farming village with a deep valley, whistling can travel significantly further and be more audible than just yelling. Once the villagers began to acquire cellphones, many found this a much easier and more efficient way to communicate. Even so, people of Kuşköy are working to maintain the language by teaching and hold festivals. Since the year 2014, the district authorities began teaching the language at primary school levels.

Due to Kuşköy being a very rural farming village, it does not provide many different opportunities in terms of jobs and lifestyle. Because of this, much of the younger generation is deciding to leave the village in search of a different life.

== Education ==
Kuş dili is currently being taught in two immersion programs. The first is taught at Karabork Primary School which had 30 attendants when it first became a class. This class teaches students the techniques of kuş dili as well as the anatomy of the mouth and teeth needed to perform this language. Later, the students would finally learn to communicate with this language.

As of 2019, kuş dili is also taught as an elective course at Turkey's Giresun University Faculty of Tourism.

== Language processing ==
Language comprehension in spoken language is associated with left-hemisphere brain activity, and encoding pitch and other acoustic properties fall under the specializations of the right hemisphere. With this in mind, kuş dili is a way of communicating the Turkish language through whistling in varied pitches and melodies. This suggests that the complexity of whistled language comprehension is reliant on equal activation of both the right and left hemispheres of the brain.

== Celebration ==
Every year since 1997, Kuşköy has held a communal based bird language, culture and art festival (tr: "Kuş Dili Kültür ve Sanat Festivali"), where the community comes together. In this festival, individuals are to compete against each other with their whistling before a panel of judges. The winner is based on who whistles the given instructions the best.

Kuşköy does not receive many visitors but the people want to share their culture and special language with others. To gain more attention from outsiders, the villagers are renovating a school to house civilians for the festival.

== Similar languages ==
=== Silbo Gomero ===
Kuş dili is not the only whistling language – there are over 50 known whistled languages. Silbo Gomero is another whistling language but instead is from the Canary Islands in Spain. Similar to kuş dili, it almost entirely copies the original language (Spanish) into a string of whistles.

Unlike kuş dili in Kuşköy, the local government has included it in the mandatory education system of the island.

Silbo Gomero faces the same challenges kuş dili does. As this language is primarily used for farming in deep valleys, the growing popularity and availability of cellphones has caused its use to decline.
