= Güce =

- Municipality
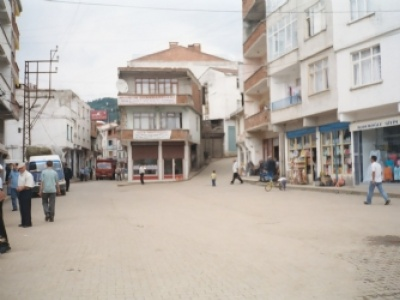

- Location within Turkey
- Coordinates: 40°53′40″N 38°48′30″E
- Country: Turkey
- Province: Giresun
- District: Güce

Government
  - Mayor: Aytekin Boduroğlu (AK Party)
- Elevation: 340 m (1,120 ft)
- Population (2022): 3,978
- Time zone: UTC+3 (TRT)
- Postal code: 28520
- Area code: 0454
- Climate: Cfa
- Website: www.guce.bel.tr

Güce is a town in Giresun Province in the Black Sea region of Turkey. It is the seat of Güce District. Its population is 3,978 (2022).

Güce is a small town providing basic amenities to the surrounding district. Güce is 55 km from the city of Giresun and 14 km inland from the Black Sea along a narrow winding road.
