= Bektaş, Giresun =

Highland and settlement in Turkey

Coordinates: 40.6499°N 38.2420°E

Bektaş (Turkish pronunciation: [ˈbectaʃ]) is a highland and settlement in Giresun Province of Turkey.

== Etymology ==
Bektaş may be a Turkish compound word of bek, "strong", and taş "stone", which refers to the big stones and rocky places on the plateau. However, according to Chepnis, it is an eponym for Haji Bektash Veli who was a holy man and a famous religious leader of Alewian Turks.

== Location and geography ==
Bektaş is located in Dereli district of Giresun province in the eastern Black Sea region of Turkey. Kulakkaya, Melikli Obası, Kurttepe location and Alçakbel are the main settlement areas which are used in summer times. Visitors come to the area in the beginning of May and leave in the end of October. The plateau cannot be visited in winter due to intense snow falls.

The mean altitude of the Bektaş is 1600 meters. It is reached via a 56-km road from Giresun city center. The weather is generally cold and foggy.

== Bektaş festivities ==
Bektaş Festivities (Turkish: Bektaş Yayla Şenlikleri) is a summer time festival which is organized in the Bektaş Plateau between 23-25 July every year.
