= Ozanlı, Şebinkarahisar =

Ozanlı
- Village
- Location of Giresun within Turkey

- Location of Ozanlı in Turkey
- Coordinates: 40°12′14″N 38°20′48″E
- Country: Turkey
- Province: Giresun
- District: Şebinkarahisar
- Elevation: 1,049 m (3,442 ft)

Population (2021)
  - Total: 96
- Postal code: 28402
- Area code: 0454
- License plate: 28

Ozanlı is a village in the Şebinkarahisar District, Giresun Province, Turkey.

== History ==
The village has had the same name since 1522.

== Geography ==
The village is 115 km away from the Giresun city center and 15 km away from the Şebinkarahisar town center. The village is located southwest of Şebinkarahisar, near the Kızılkaya Dam Lake. It is connected directly to the district center via a village road passing through Kule village.

== Population ==
Population data by year
2021	96
2020	102
2019	117
2018	136
2017	116
2016	134
2015	134
2014	148
2013	171
2012	182
2011	183
2010	174
2009	181
2008	179
2007	188
2000	172
1990	338
1985	513
1965	356
