= Yenice, Çamoluk =

Yenice
- Village
- Location within Turkey
- Coordinates: 40°06′N 38°53′E
- Country: Turkey
- Province: Giresun
- District: Çamoluk
- Elevation: 1,380 m (4,530 ft)
- Population (2022): 458
- Time zone: UTC+3 (TRT)
- Postal code: 28710
- Area code: 0454

Yenice is a village in Çamoluk District of Giresun Province, Turkey. Its population is 458 (2022). Before the 2013 reorganisation, it was a town (belde). It is situated to the south of Kelkit River valley. Distance to Çamoluk is 16 kilometres (9.9 mi). Situated at the extreme south east of the province the distance to Giresun is over 200 kilometres (120 mi) and the road between Giresun and Çamoluk needs to be repaired. The main economic activity is agriculture. Beehiving is another sector.
