= Kekiktepe, Eynesil =

Kekiktepe
- Village
- Location in Turkey
- Coordinates: 41.0345°N 39.1004°E
- Country: Turkey
- Province: Giresun
- District: Eynesil
- Population (2023): 578
- Time zone: UTC+3 (TRT)

Kekiktepe is a village in the Eynesil District of Giresun province. The village is mentioned as Heri in 1876 records.

== Population ==
Historical population
Year	Pop.	±% p.a.
1965	868	—
1985	933	+0.36%
1990	764	−3.92%
1997	517	−5.43%
2007	535	+0.34%
2012	517	−0.68%
2017	473	−1.76%
2023	578	+3.40%
Source: Population censuses (1965-1997) and TÜİK (2007-2023)
