= Yağlıdere =

- Municipality
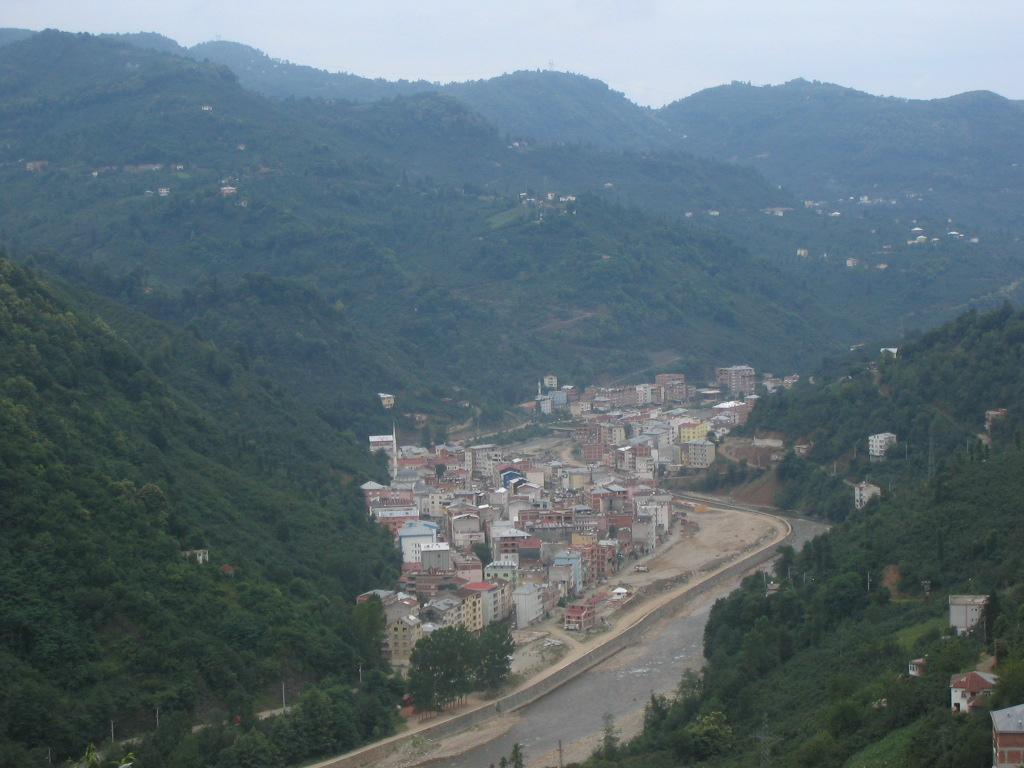

- Location within Turkey
- Coordinates: 40°51′26″N 38°37′57″E
- Country: Turkey
- Province: Giresun
- District: Yağlıdere

Government
  - Mayor: Yaşar İbaş (MHP)
- Elevation: 50 m (160 ft)
- Population (2022): 7,042
- Time zone: UTC+3 (TRT)
- Postal code: 28610
- Area code: 0454
- Climate: Cfa
- Website: www.yaglidere.bel.tr

Yağlıdere is a town in Giresun Province in the Black Sea region of Turkey. It is the seat of Yağlıdere District. Its population is 7,042 (2022). It is in the valley of the Yağlıdere stream, which gives the town its name. The small town of Yağlıdere was founded in 1811 with a marketplace and large mosque.

== Etymology ==
Yağlıdere means "fat stream". There are two hypotheses regarding the origin of the name. One says that in Cakrak village, an ancient Greek town, people use stone tubes from high parts of village to transport milk to the riverside, or town center, making the river seem fat. Others say that the river is cursed by Saint Hacı Abdullah Halife, who says "be fat, river, and take one person's life every year."

The town's original name was "Camiyanı" ("next to the mosque").

== History ==
Yağlıdere has historically belonged to the Colchis Kingdom, Pontus Kingdom, Roman Empire, Trabzon Greek Empire, and Ottoman Empire.

Colchis was a wealthy kingdom, rich with mineral deposits. The Colchis used gold and mined other materials. The region also was rich with fruits and wild vegetables. After the Colchis Kingdom's reign and before the Roman Empire expanded, the king Mithridates VI of Pontus ran away to Sinoria and built 75 strongholds in this area.

The Roman Empire, under Justinian I, built many bridges, churches, and monasteries in the region.

== Tourism ==
Known as a fertile and rainy land, Yağlıdere is one of the most important Turkish eco-tourism centers in the 21st century. Several native crops offer local organic cuisine, and the village is known for having healthy inhabitants as a result of the food.

Common tourist activities include a visit to the tomb of Sarı Halife in Tekkeköy, resting in Ayvat in Sinirköy (Sinoria) for a glass of tea, or sampling the local meat.

Other attractions include Golyani (meaning "nearby lake"), a high plateau with impressive views; the old churches in Cakrak; swimming in the stream during the summertime; and Akilbaba Hill (2.800 m), which offers views of the mountains on sunny days. The terrain includes both beaches and forests, featuring oak, alder, pine, and hazelnut trees. In July, there are summer festivals in Bulari, Kazikbeli and Kümbet.

Most parts of the region have comfortable tourist accommodations, with the exception of some of the more remote mountain villages. When staying for more than a few weeks, it is traditional to give the locals a gift of fruits and vegetables.

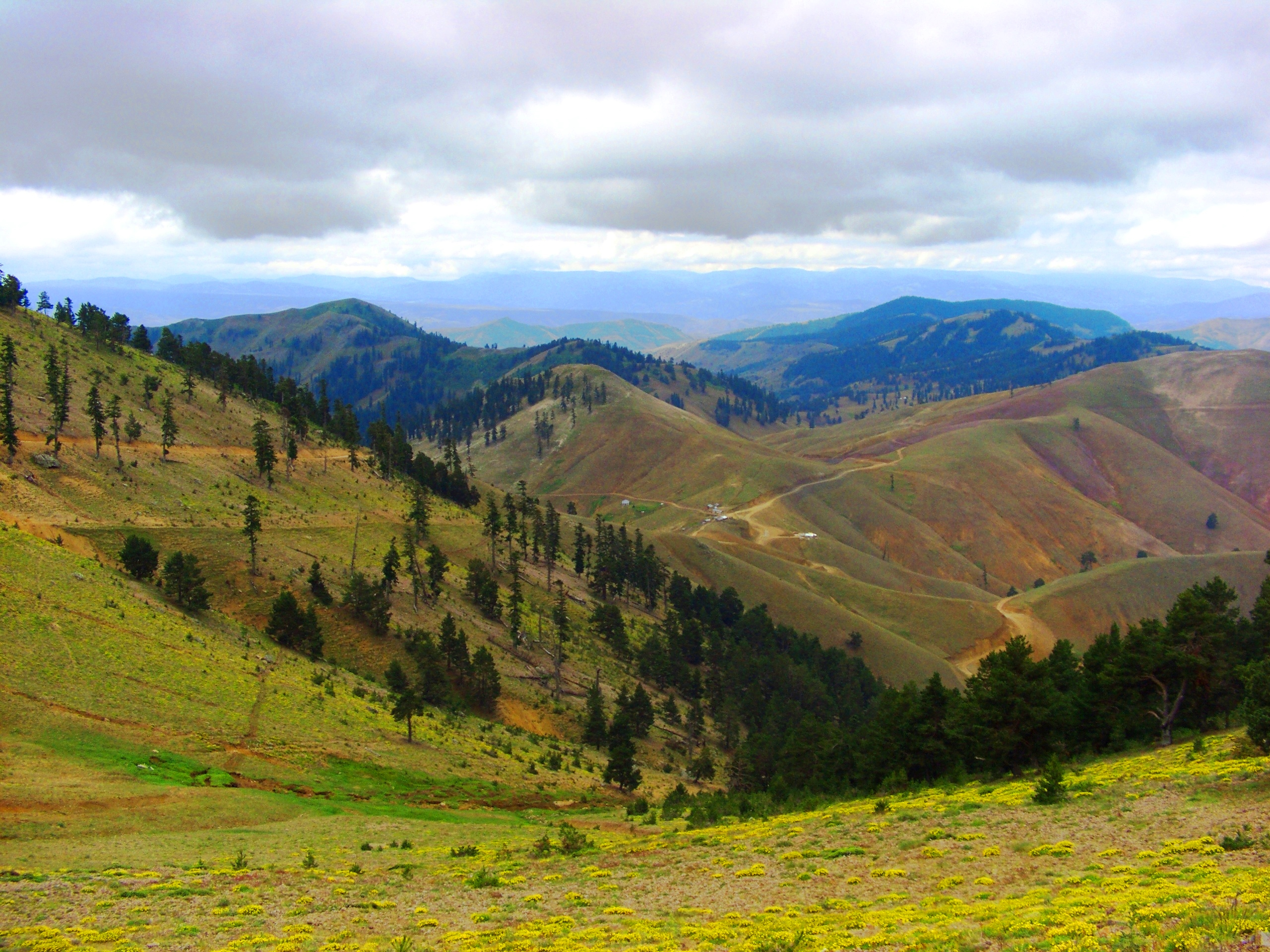
Kurtbeli, the birthplace of Tohumluk stream, a main tributary of Yağlıdere

== Cuisine ==
The highlands produce dairy products, including several cheeses. "Tecen peyniri" is made with herbs and spices, typically consumed with breakfast. Another very dry cheese is used to make muhlama (kuymak, havits) or cheese fondue.

The most well-known vegetable in the region is dark cabbage. The cabbage is used in a variety of dishes, including "kara lahana dolmasi" and "dible", a variation on the standard Turkish dolma.

Some consider Black Sea food the best in Turkey, particularly the fruit such as cherries and apricots.

== Weather ==
The coastal regions have much milder winters and snow is rare. The Black Sea coast is a little colder in winter than the west and south coasts. The Black Sea coast has some rain year round and east of Samsun the rain is heavy in the summer and autumn. Summers are warm and humid and the weather is often cloudy and temperamental.

The interior plateau is typically dry and has cold or very cold winters. The eastern plateau is as cold in winter as parts of the Russian Federation. Snowfall is common in the winter and in the east a ground covering of snow for three and four months is common. Except at the higher elevations, summers in the interior are warm or hot with occasional thunderstorms.

== Immigration to the United States ==
As of 2024 there are more than 50000 illegal refugees from Yaglidere in the US. Most asylum seekers live on the East Coast, including New York, New Jersey, Connecticut, and Delaware. In the 1960s most came for work, and later for both work and education.

In November 2017, U.S-born Hacıbey Çatalbaşoğlu, whose parents hail from Yağlıdere, became the youngest politician in U.S. history after his election to the municipal council in New Haven, Connecticut.
