= Keşap =

- Municipality
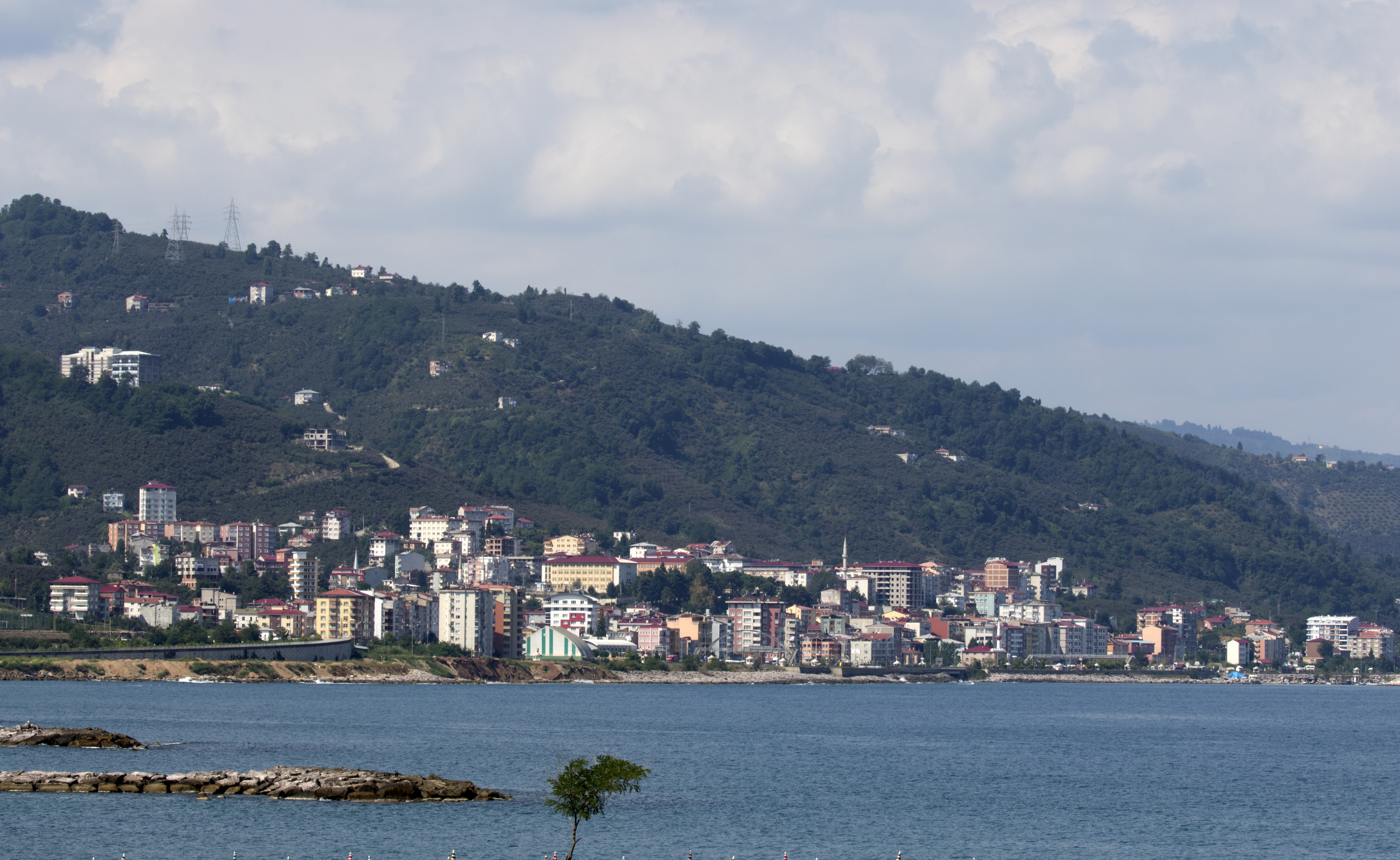

- Location within Turkey
- Coordinates: 40°55′N 38°31′E
- Country: Turkey
- Province: Giresun
- District: Keşap

Government
  - Mayor: Tuncay Muhammet Arişan (AKP)
- Elevation: 95 m (312 ft)
- Population (2022): 9,227
- Time zone: UTC+3 (TRT)
- Postal code: 28900
- Area code: 0454
- Climate: Cfa
- Website: www.kesap.bel.tr

Keşap is a town in Giresun Province on the Black Sea coast of Turkey just to the east of the city of Giresun. It is the seat of Keşap District. Its population is 9,227 (2022).

The TV sitcom Uy! Başuma Gelenler was filmed in a village in Keşap.

== History ==
See Giresun for the long history of this area, dating back to the Persians and the Seleucids.
