= Akharman, Görele =

Akharman
- Village
- Location within Turkey
- Coordinates: 40°58′N 39°00′E
- Country: Turkey
- Province: Giresun
- District: Görele
- Population (2022): 82
- Time zone: UTC+3 (TRT)

Akharman is a village in the Görele District of Giresun Province. Its population is 82 (2022). It is 75 km away from Giresun city and 11 km away from Görele town.

== Population ==
Historical population
Year	Pop.	±% p.a.
1997	76	—
2007	69	−0.96%
2012	74	+1.41%
2017	70	−1.11%
2022	82	+3.22%
Source: 1997 census and TÜIK (2007-2022)
