= Üçtepe, Yağlıdere =

Town in northern Turkey

Üçtepe
- Municipality
- Location in Turkey
- Coordinates: 40°43′34″N 38°37′41″E
- Country: Turkey
- Province: Giresun
- District: Yağlıdere
- Population (2022): 2,193
- Time zone: UTC+3 (TRT)

Üçtepe is a town (belde) in the Yağlıdere District, Giresun Province, Turkey. Its population is 2,193 (2022).
