= Dereköy, Eynesil =

Dereköy
- Village
- Location in Turkey
- Coordinates: 41.0202°N 39.1210°E
- Country: Turkey
- Province: Giresun
- District: Eynesil
- Population (2023): 322
- Time zone: UTC+3 (TRT)

Dereköy is a village in the Eynesil District of Giresun province. The old name of the village is mentioned as 'Mançaba'.

== Population ==
Historical population
Year	Pop.	±% p.a.
1965	460	—
1985	631	+1.59%
1990	568	−2.08%
1997	422	−4.16%
2007	336	−2.25%
2012	295	−2.57%
2017	257	−2.72%
2023	322	+3.83%
Source: Population censuses (1965-1997) and TÜİK (2007-2023)
