= Kuşköy =

- Village
- Location within Turkey
- Coordinates: 40.8763056°N 39.025493°E
- Country: Turkey
- Province: Giresun
- District: Çanakçı
- Population (2022): 393
- Time zone: UTC+3 (TRT)

Kuşköy (English meaning is "Village of the Birds") is a village in Çanakçı District of Giresun Province in the Black Sea region of Turkey. Its population is 393 (2022). The village is famous for its 400-year-old whistled language that is used by the local residents.

== Population ==
Historical population
| Year | Pop. | ±% p.a. |
|---|---|---|
| 1997 | 713 | — |
| 2007 | 573 | −2.16% |
| 2012 | 440 | −5.15% |
| 2017 | 405 | −1.64% |
| 2022 | 393 | −0.60% |
Source: Population census (1997) and TÜIK (2007-2022)

== See also ==
- Turkish bird language
