= Kösemen, Eynesil =

Kösemen
- Village
- Location within Turkey
- Coordinates: 40°58′34″N 39°06′57″E
- Country: Turkey
- Province: Giresun
- District: Eynesil
- Population (2023): 114
- Time zone: UTC+3 (TRT)

Kösemen is a village in the Eynesil District of Giresun Province, northeastern Turkey.

== Population ==
Historical population
Year	Pop.	±% p.a.
1965	259	—
1985	279	+0.37%
1990	210	−5.52%
1997	99	−10.19%
2007	83	−1.75%
2012	107	+5.21%
2017	88	−3.83%
2023	114	+4.41%
Source: Population censuses (1965-1997) and TÜİK (2007-2023)
