= Ören, Eynesil =

Ören
- Municipality
- Location in Turkey
- Coordinates: 41°02′02″N 39°08′53″E
- Country: Turkey
- Province: Giresun
- District: Eynesil
- Population (2022): 2,138
- Time zone: UTC+3 (TRT)

Ören is a town (belde) in the Eynesil District, Giresun Province, Turkey. Its population is 2,138 (2022).
