= Çanakçı =

- Municipality
- Location within Turkey
- Coordinates: 40°55′N 38°59′E
- Country: Turkey
- Province: Giresun
- District: Çanakçı

Government
  - Mayor: Tuncay Kasım (SP)
- Elevation: 372 m (1,220 ft)
- Population (2022): 1,868
- Time zone: UTC+3 (TRT)
- Postal code: 28810
- Area code: 0454
- Climate: Cfb
- Website: www.canakci.bel.tr

Çanakçı is a town in Giresun Province in the Black Sea region of Turkey. It is the seat of Çanakçı District. Its population is 1,868 (2022).

Çanakçı is a small town inland from the Black Sea coastal town of Görele. Formerly part of the district of Görele, it became a district seat in 1990.

Famous "Kuşdili" festival is held in Çanakçı every July. Hundreds of people from nearby places attend this festival.

The Kemenche, which is one of the traditional Eastern Black Sea instruments, is played in Çanakçı. One of the most important folk songs is "Çanakçı'dan aşağı".
