= İshaklı, Eynesil =

İshaklı
- Village
- Location in Turkey
- Coordinates: 41.0319°N 39.1296°E
- Country: Turkey
- Province: Giresun
- District: Eynesil
- Population (2023): 441
- Time zone: UTC+3 (TRT)

İshaklı is a village in the Eynesil District of Giresun province. The village is mentioned as Nefsi Ishaklı in 1876 records.

== Population ==
Historical population
Year	Pop.	±% p.a.
1965	1,275	—
1985	1,475	+0.73%
1990	1,162	−4.66%
1997	813	−4.97%
2007	723	−1.17%
2012	721	−0.06%
2017	641	−2.32%
2023	441	−6.04%
Source: Population censuses (1965-1997) and TÜİK (2007-2023)
