= Piraziz District =

District of Giresun Province, Turkey

- District
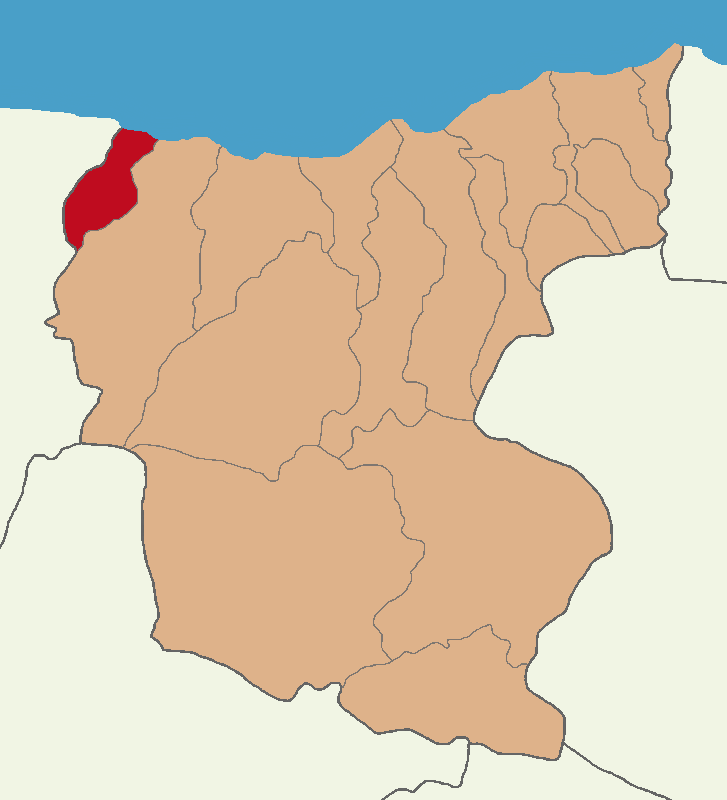
- Map showing Piraziz District in Giresun Province

- Location in Turkey
- Coordinates: 40°56′N 38°08′E
- Country: Turkey
- Province: Giresun
- Seat: Piraziz

Government
  - Kaymakam: Kezban Yerlikaya
- Area: 127 km^{2} (49 sq mi)
- Population (2022): 13,825
  - Density: 110/km^{2} (280/sq mi)
- Time zone: UTC+3 (TRT)
- Website: www.piraziz.gov.tr

Piraziz District is a district of the Giresun Province of Turkey. Its seat is the town of Piraziz. Its area is 127 km^{2}, and its population is 13,825 (2022). The district was established in 1987.

== Composition ==
There is one municipality in Piraziz District:

- Piraziz

There are 22 villages in Piraziz District:

- Akçay
- Alidede
- Armutçukuru
- Balçıklı
- Bozat
- Bülbüllü
- Çağlandere
- Çayırköy
- Deregözü
- Esentepe
- Gökçeali
- Güneyköy
- Güzelköy
- Hasanşeyh
- Kılıçlı
- Medrese
- Narlık
- Nefsi Piraziz
- Örnekköy
- Şerefli
- Tepeköy
- Yunusemre
