= Yağlıdere District =

District of Giresun Province, Turkey

- District
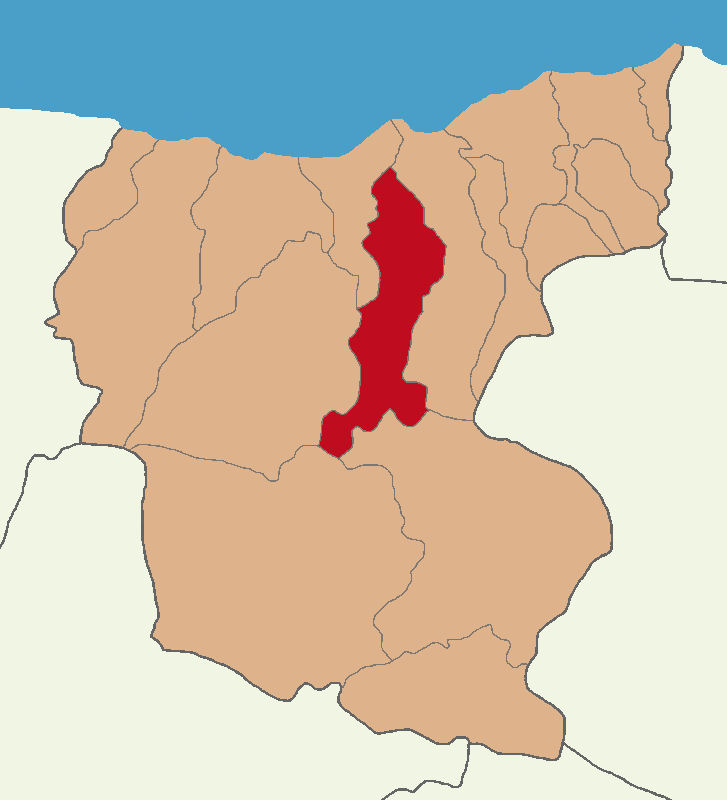
- Map showing Yağlıdere District in Giresun Province

- Location in Turkey
- Coordinates: 40°48′N 38°39′E
- Country: Turkey
- Province: Giresun
- Seat: Yağlıdere

Government
  - Kaymakam: Kübra Dogruer
- Area: 327 km^{2} (126 sq mi)
- Population (2022): 15,004
  - Density: 46/km^{2} (120/sq mi)
- Time zone: UTC+3 (TRT)
- Website: www.yaglidere.gov.tr

Yağlıdere District is a district of the Giresun Province of Turkey. Its seat is the town of Yağlıdere. Its area is 327 km^{2}, and its population is 15,004 (2022).

The district covers one end of the Giresun Mountains, including part of the valley of the Yağlıdere stream. When the mountain streams that feed the Yağlıdere are in full flood, they can become a threat to the district. Yağlıdere is an agricultural district. The hillsides are planted with hazelnuts, fruit trees, chestnuts, and other deciduous trees. Some tea and corn are grown, and animals graze on the higher slopes.

== Composition ==
There are two municipalities in Yağlıdere District:

- Üçtepe
- Yağlıdere

There are 21 villages in Yağlıdere District:

- Akköy
- Akpınar
- Dereköy
- Derindere
- Elmabelen
- Güllüce
- Hisarcık
- Kanlıca
- Koçlu
- Küçükköy
- Ortaköy
- Sınırköy
- Sinanlı
- Tekkeköy
- Ümütbükü
- Yazlık
- Yeniakköy
- Yenice
- Yeniyazlık
- Yeşilpınar
- Yeşilyurt
