= Yarımca, Eynesil =

Yarımca
- Village
- Location within Turkey
- Coordinates: 40.9654°N 39.1271°E
- Country: Turkey
- Province: Giresun
- District: Eynesil
- Population (2023): 189
- Time zone: UTC+3 (TRT)

Yarımca is a village in the Eynesil District of Giresun Province, Turkey. The village is mentioned as Koçulu in 1928 records.

== Population ==
Historical population
Year	Pop.	±% p.a.
1965	432	—
1985	512	+0.85%
1990	388	−5.40%
1997	287	−4.22%
2007	194	−3.84%
2012	213	+1.89%
2017	211	−0.19%
2023	189	−1.82%
Source: Population censuses (1965-1997) and TÜİK (2007-2023)
