= Güce District =

District of Giresun Province, Turkey

- District
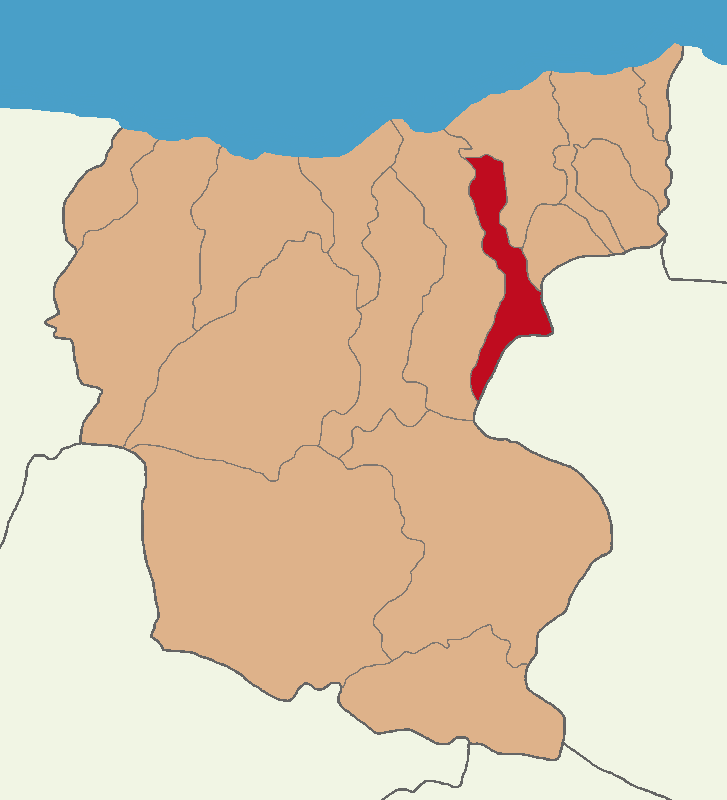
- Map showing Güce District in Giresun Province

- Location in Turkey
- Coordinates: 40°49′N 38°49′E
- Country: Turkey
- Province: Giresun
- Seat: Güce

Government
  - Kaymakam: İbrahim Zahid Ahat
- Area: 351 km^{2} (136 sq mi)
- Population (2022): 7,806
  - Density: 22/km^{2} (58/sq mi)
- Time zone: UTC+3 (TRT)
- Website: www.guce.gov.tr

Güce District is a district of the Giresun Province of Turkey. Its seat is the town of Güce. Its area is 351 km^{2}, and its population is 7,806 (2022). It is a hilly district, and its lower areas are used for cultivating hazelnuts plus some tea and corn.

== Composition ==
There is one municipality in Güce District:

- Güce

There are 13 villages in Güce District:

- Akpınar
- Boncukçukur
- Dayıcık
- Düzçukur
- Ergenekon
- Fırınlı
- Gürağaç
- Ilit
- Kuluncak
- Örnek
- Sarıyar
- Tekkeköy
- Yukarıboynuyoğun
