= Kuşçulu, Görele =

Kuşçulu
- Village
- Location in Turkey
- Coordinates: 41°01′36″N 38°57′38″E
- Country: Turkey
- Province: Giresun
- District: Görele
- Population (2022): 258
- Time zone: UTC+3 (TRT)

Kuşçulu is a village in the Görele District of Giresun Province, Turkey. Its population is 258 (2022).

== Population ==
Historical population
Year	Pop.	±% p.a.
1997	215	—
2007	176	−1.98%
2012	248	+7.10%
2017	282	+2.60%
2022	258	−1.76%
Source: 1997 census and TÜIK (2007-2022)
