= Çanakçı District =

District of Giresun Province, Turkey

- District
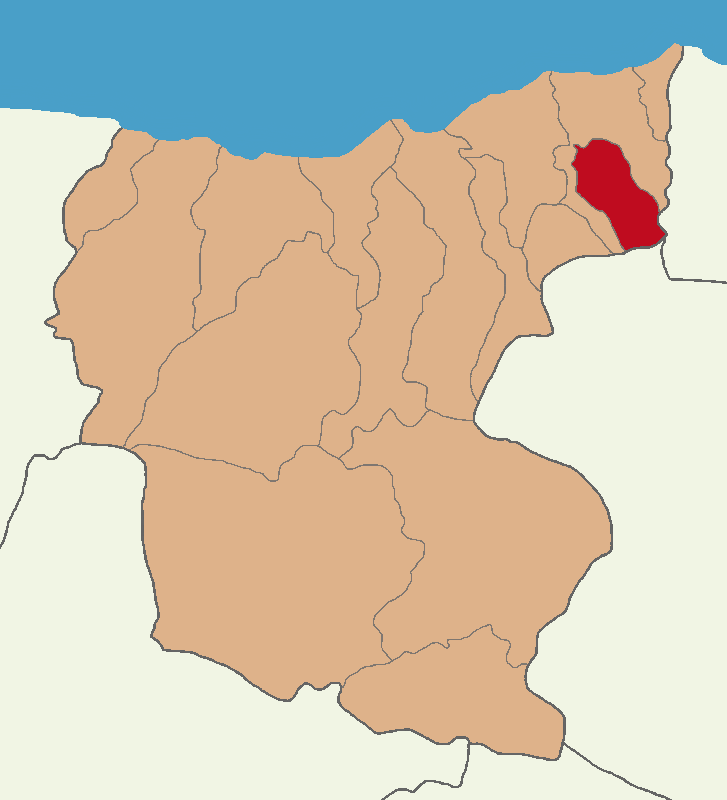
- Map showing Çanakçı District in Giresun Province

- Location in Turkey
- Coordinates: 40°55′N 38°59′E
- Country: Turkey
- Province: Giresun
- Seat: Çanakçı

Government
  - Kaymakam: Mustafa Talha Aydın
- Area: 142 km^{2} (55 sq mi)
- Population (2022): 5,981
  - Density: 42/km^{2} (110/sq mi)
- Time zone: UTC+3 (TRT)
- Website: www.canakci.gov.tr

Çanakçı District is a district of the Giresun Province of Turkey. Its seat is the town of Çanakçı. Its area is 142 km^{2}, and its population is 5,981 (2022).

The district was established in 1990.

== Composition ==
There is one municipality in Çanakçı District:

- Çanakçı

There are 15 villages in Çanakçı District:

- Akköy
- Bakımlı
- Çağlayan
- Deregözü
- Doğanköy
- Düzköy
- Egeköy
- Erenköy
- Kahraman
- Kaledibi
- Karabörk
- Kuşköy
- Sarayköy
- Yenişadı
- Yeşilköy
