= Piraziz =

- Municipality
- Location within Turkey
- Coordinates: 40°56′N 38°08′E
- Country: Turkey
- Province: Giresun
- District: Piraziz

Government
  - Mayor: Mahmut Esat Ayyıldız (AKP)
- Elevation: 97 m (318 ft)
- Population (2022): 8,400
- Time zone: UTC+3 (TRT)
- Postal code: 28340
- Area code: 0454
- Climate: Cfa
- Website: piraziz.bel.tr

Piraziz is a town in Giresun Province on the Black Sea coast of Turkey. It is the seat of Piraziz District. Its population is 8,400 (2022).

Piraziz was part of the neighbouring Bulancak district until 1987, when the Piraziz District was established.

== Etymology ==
In the Ottoman Empire period, the town was named Piridede-Abdal.

== Economy ==
The local economy depends on growing hazelnuts and fishing in the Black Sea.

Due to the poor economic conditions of the region, many people have migrated away to find better paying jobs in other parts of Turkey.
