= Aralık, Eynesil =

Aralık
- Village
- Location in Turkey
- Coordinates: 41.0422°N 39.1142°E
- Country: Turkey
- Province: Giresun
- District: Eynesil
- Population (2023): 518
- Time zone: UTC+3 (TRT)

Aralık is a village in the Eynesil District of Giresun Province. The village has had the same name since 1876.

== Population ==
Historical population
Year	Pop.	±% p.a.
1985	664	—
1990	602	−1.94%
1997	438	−4.44%
2007	339	−2.53%
2012	397	+3.21%
2017	391	−0.30%
2023	518	+4.80%
Source: Population censuses (1985-1997) and TÜİK (2007-2023)
