= Eynesil =

- Municipality
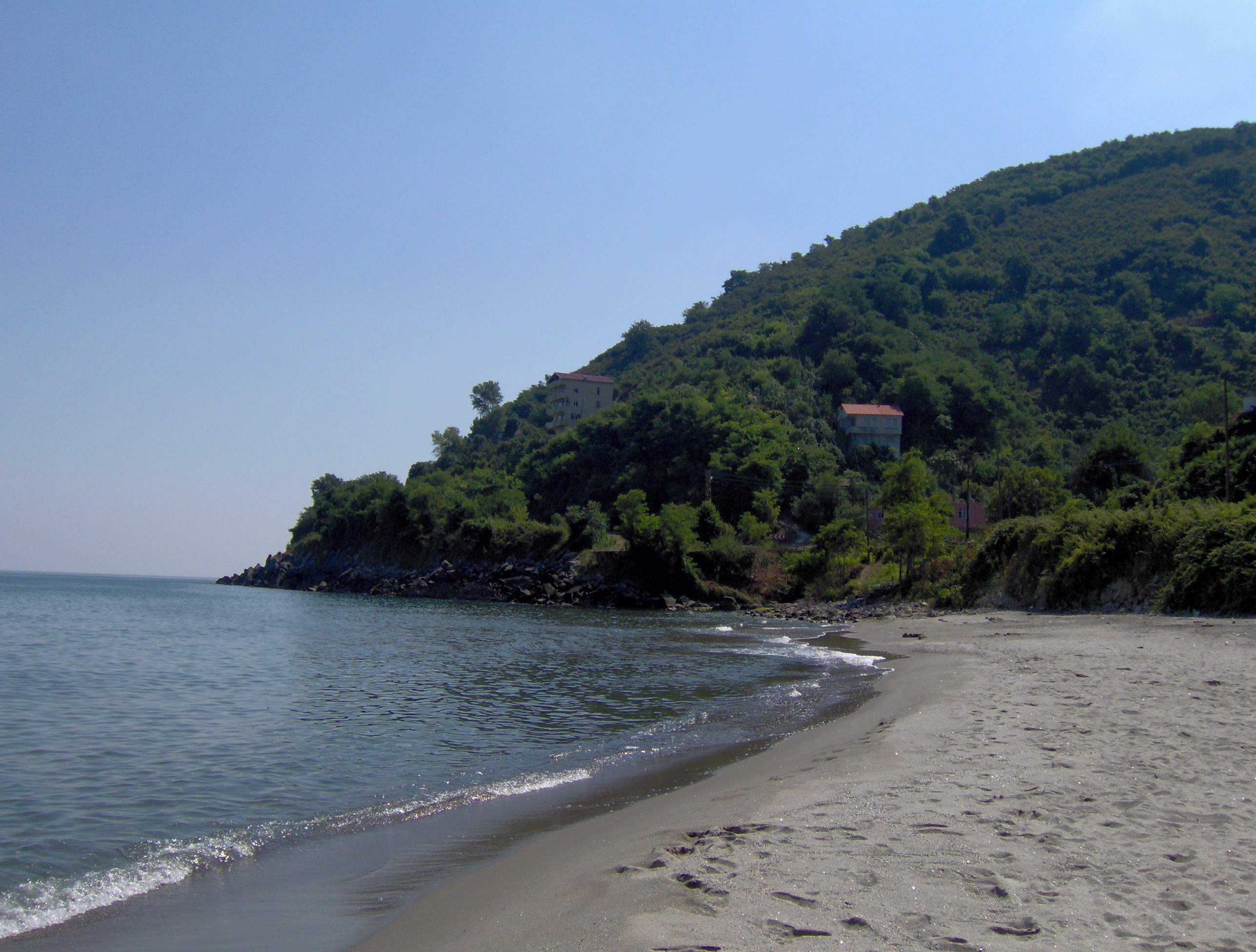
- Eynesil beach

- Location within Turkey
- Coordinates: 41°03′N 39°08′E
- Country: Turkey
- Province: Giresun
- District: Eynesil

Government
  - Mayor: Bariş Güdük (MHP)
- Elevation: 88 m (289 ft)
- Population (2022): 7,083
- Time zone: UTC+3 (TRT)
- Area code: 0454
- Climate: Cfa
- Website: www.eynesil.bel.tr

Eynesil is a town in Giresun Province on the Black Sea coast of Turkey, east of the city of Giresun, towards Trabzon. It is the seat of Eynesil District. Its population is 7,083 (2022).

== History ==
=== Antiquity ===
The history of the area dates back to the Hittites in 1500BC, followed by the Phrygians in 1200BC. The Ancient Greeks arrived in 765 BC and in 670BC a colony of the Aegean Greek community of Miletos was founded, one of a chain of 90 trading posts along the Black Sea coast. By 520 BC Eynesil was in the territory of the Satrap of Pontus, a territory of the Persian Empire. This was succeeded by the Roman Empire and the Byzantines and in 1204 the Empire of Trebizond, a rump-Byzantine state that lasted until it was overthrown by Sultan Mehmet II of the Ottoman Empire in 1461.

During the medieval period one of the most important guardians of the coastal road connecting Trabzon to Samsun was the large Byzantine garrison fort located about 3 kilometers east of modern town of Eynesil. An archaeological and historical assessment of this site as well as a scaled plan were published in 1985. The impressive circuit walls and defenses create two separate baileys with the remains of numerous rooms. The site briefly served as a Russian military depot and lighthouse (1877–78) during the Russo-Turkish War. Today it has become a popular tourist attraction.

=== The Turkish era ===
In December 1461 Eynesil became part of the Ottoman Empire, and the first Turkish people to move into the area were the Chepni, followers of Haji Bektash Veli and therefore responsible for the strength of the Alevi community in Eynesil.

== See also ==
- Mount Sis
- Chepni
