= Mustafa Koç =

Mustafa Koç may refer to:

- Mustafa Koç (volleyball), Turkish volleyball player
- Mustafa Vehbi Koç, a member of the Koç family, a Turkish family of business people
