= Yasemin Yalçın =

Turkish actress (born 1964)

- Born: 1964 (age 61–62); İstanbul, Turkey
- Occupations: Actress; comedian
- Spouse(s): Halil Ateşler (div. 1986); İlyas İlbey

Yasemin Yalçın (born 1964, İstanbul) is a Turkish Actor and comedian. She was born as the daughter of a family from Malatya, Pütürge. She graduated from high school in 1982 and received education at the Istanbul Metropolitan Municipality Conservatory in the same year. She appeared on the album with the song "Taht Kurmuşsun Kalbime", which she performed on the "Makeup Room Songs" album released by Suzan Kardeş. After learning that her daughter has diabetes, she took a break from the theater for a while.

She has won the Golden Butterfly Awards "Best Female Comedy Actress" award 4 times.

She is married to actor and comedian İlyas İlbey.

== Theatre ==
- Emlakçıyı Beklerken – 2022
- Oyunun Oyunu – Micheal Frayne – Beşiktaş Kültür Merkezi 2008
- Artiz Mektebi – Müjdat Gezen / Kandemir Konduk – Şan Tiyatrosu 1998
- Kadınlık Bizde Kalsın – Yılmaz Erdoğan – 1992

== Filmography ==
Year	Project	Role	Notes
2021	Çok Güzel Hareketler 2	Sürahi Nine	Guest Actress
2017	Vezir Parmağı	Nurdane	Film
2015	Manda Yuvası	Deli Akile	Film
2014	Mihrap Yerinde	Mihrap	Series
2011	Yasemin Yalçın ile Yılbaşı Özel 2011	Sürahi Nine	One-shot television show
2010	Yasemince	Halide, Şuayip, Alican, Kakılmış, Sürahi Hanım, Gülazer	Series
2008	Aman Annem Görmesin	Kaçık Hatçe	Series
2005	AB'nin Yolları Taştan	Suzan Çekirdek	TV Mini Series
2005	Yasemince	Kuma, Beteroğlan, Ofisnur, Safinaz	Series
2002	Sana Bayılıyorum	Mine	Series
2000	Yasemince 2000	Kakılmış, Şuayip, Fevriye, Hamsinaz, Rahvan Hecevit	Series
1996–2003	Yasemince	Hamsiye, Kakılmış, Başbayan – Dışbayan, Gülazer, Sürahi Hanım, Latife Hanım, Şuayip, Halte Ana, Kahvedeki Erkek Nuri	Series
1995	İnce İnce Yasemince	Hamsiye, Başbayan, Alican, Şehvet Abla, Kakılmış, Sürahi Hanım, Gülazer, Değişik skeçlerdeki tiplemeleri	Series
1994	Yaseminname	Alican, Sürahi Hanım, Değişik skeçlerdeki tiplemeleri	Series
1993	Haşlama Taşlama	Habermen, Sürahi Hanım, Alican, Asminyez (Hayatın Dalları), Keloğlan, Değişik skeçlerdeki tiplemeleri	Series
1991	Varyemez	Dürdane	Series
1990	Bir Başka Gece – Mesela Dedik	Alican	Series
1989	Talih Kuşu	Leman	Film
1987	Babamız Eğleniyor	Elmas	Film

== Awards ==
- Golden Butterfly Awards "Best Female Comedy Actress" 1991
- Golden Butterfly Awards "Best Female Comedy Actress" 1992
- Golden Butterfly Awards "Best Female Comedy Actress" 1993
- Golden Butterfly Awards "Best Female Comedy Actress" 1995
