= Mount Sis =

Mountain in Turkey

- Location within Turkey

Highest point
- Elevation: 2,182 m (7,159 ft)
- Coordinates: 40°53′0″N 39°6′0″E

Geography
- Location: Görele, Giresun Province, Turkey

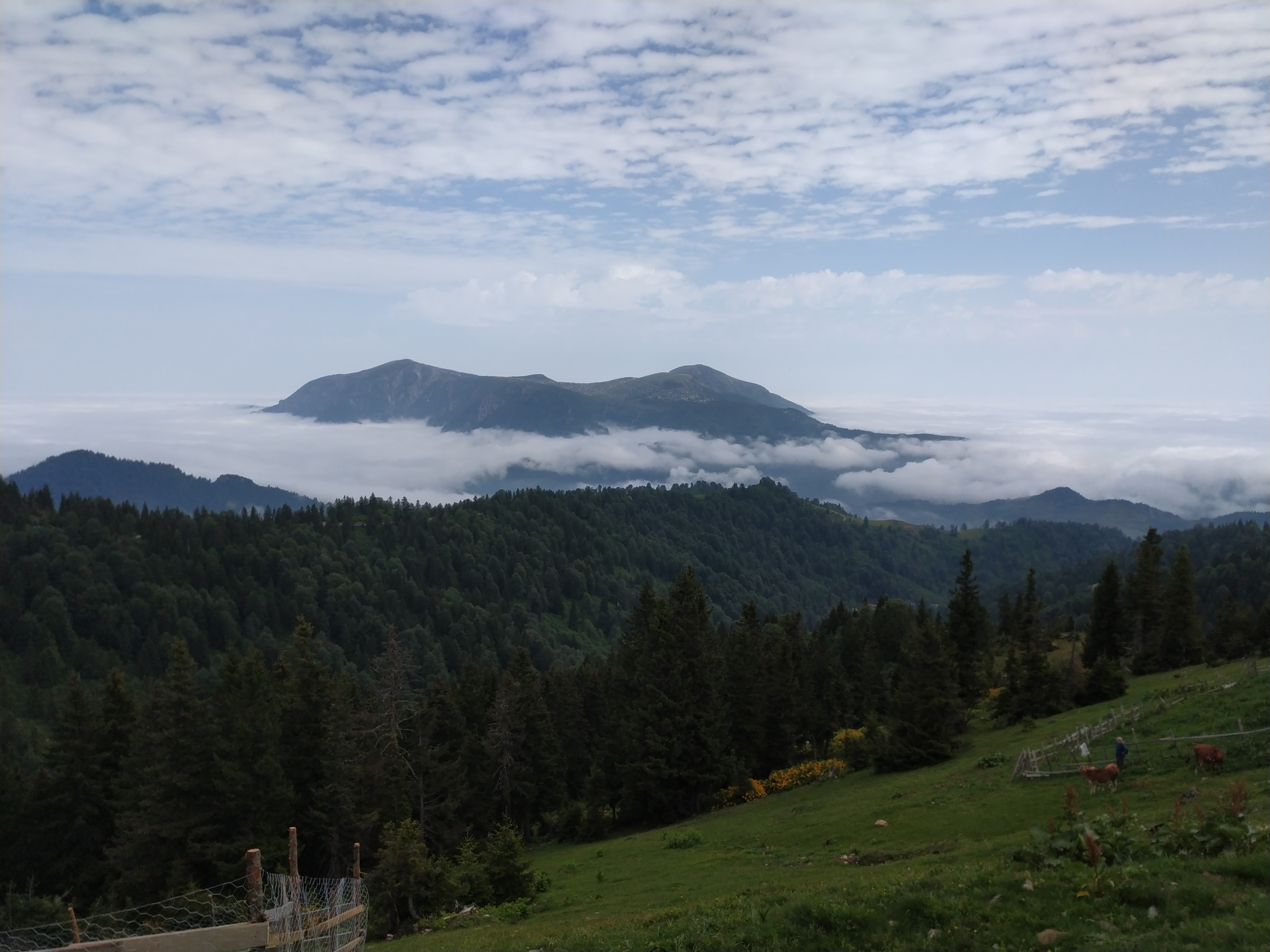
View of Mount Sis

Mount Sis (Turkish: Sis Dağı) is a mountain in Görele, Giresun Province, Turkey, very near the border with Trabzon Province. Its elevation is 2182 m (7159 ft) and it is part of the Pontic Mountains.

Mount Sis Festival (Turkish: Sis Dağı Şenlikleri) attracts hundreds of people from Giresun and Trabzon to visit Mount Sis. During the festival, traditional costumes are worn by visitors. The first Mount Sis Festival is thought to be held in 1830s. Mount Sis has also a plateau which is called "Sis Dağı Yaylası" in Turkey.
