= İlyas İlbey =

Turkish actor and comedian

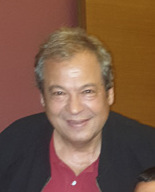
- Born: March 3, 1960 (age 65); Kastamonu, Turkey
- Occupations: Actor, comedian
- Spouse: Yasemin Yalçın

İlyas İlbey (born 1960) is a Turkish actor and comedian. He is the husband of theater actress and comedian Yasemin Yalçın.

İlbey became known especially for the parodies he played with Yasemin Yalçın in the comedy and humor program Ince Ince Yasemince. He became famous and loved for his "İtilmiş" typing in the game "İtilmiş and Kakılmış", which he played on the same program. The player, who is known for his fondness for horse racing, also has his own racehorses.

== Filmography ==
- Öyle Olsun – 1976
- Mahallenin Muhtarları – 1992
- Haşlama Taşlama – 1993
- İnce İnce Yasemince – 1995
- Yasemince – 1997
- Yasemince 2000 – 2000
- Sana Bayılıyorum – 2002
- Çocuklar Duymasın
- Yasemince – 2010
- Mandıra Filozofu – 2013
- Mihrap Yerinde – 2014
- Manda Yuvası – 2015
