= Çavuşlu, Giresun =

Çavuşlu
- Municipality
- Location in Turkey
- Coordinates: 41°02′N 39°04′E
- Country: Turkey
- Province: Giresun
- District: Görele
- Elevation: 15 m (49 ft)
- Population (2022): 2,142
- Time zone: UTC+3 (TRT)
- Postal code: 28820
- Area code: 0454

Çavuşlu is a town (belde) in the Görele District, Giresun Province, Turkey. Its population is 2,142 (2022). It is a coastal town. The distance to Görele is 6 kilometres (3.7 mi) and to Giresun is 65 kilometres (40 mi). There are Roman ruins around the town. According to two conflicting theories about the origin of the present population, the town was founded either by the Chuvash people (a Turkic people in Russia) who escaped from Timur in the 14th century or by Turkmen tribe named Çuvaz from south Iran.
