= Giresun Province =

Province of Turkey

Coordinates: 40°34′47″N 38°35′40″E

Giresun Province Giresun ili
- Province
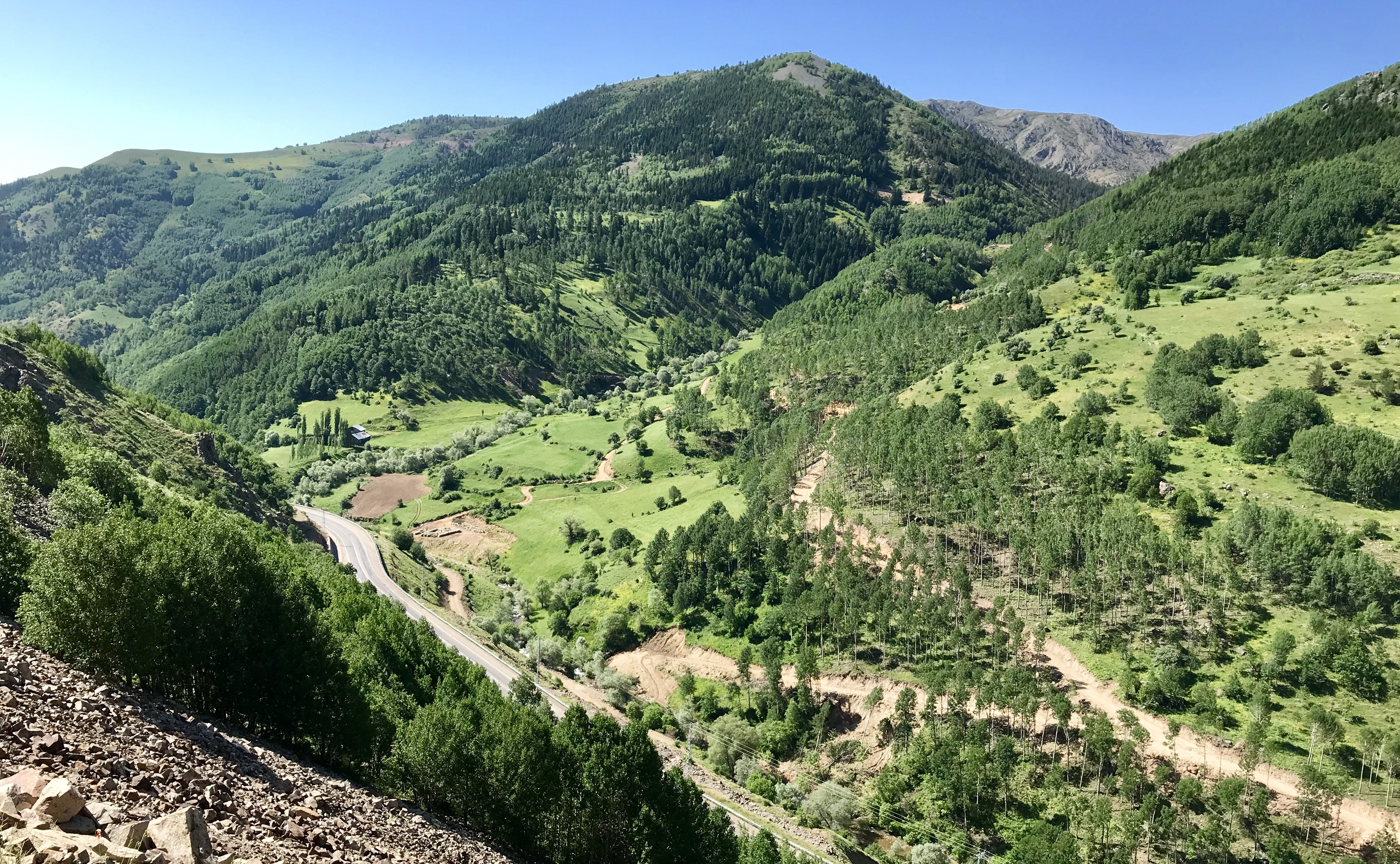
- Birch forest in Şebinkarahisar, Giresun Province

- Location of the province within Turkey
- Country: Turkey
- Seat: Giresun

Government
  - Governor: Mustafa Koç
- Area: 6,972 km^{2} (2,692 sq mi)
- Population (2022): 450,862
  - Density: 64.67/km^{2} (167.5/sq mi)
- Time zone: UTC+3 (TRT)
- Area code: 0454
- Website: www.giresun.gov.tr

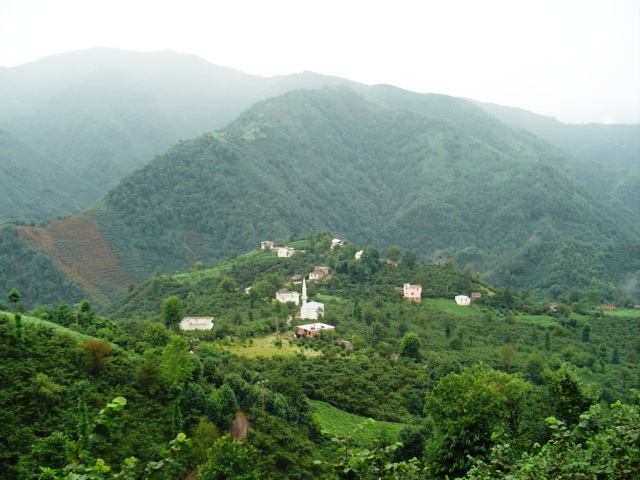
Çımaklı village in the Espiye district, Giresun

Giresun Province (Turkish: Giresun ili) is a province of Turkey on the Black Sea coast. Its adjacent provinces are Trabzon to the east, Gümüşhane to the southeast, Erzincan to the south, Sivas to the southwest, and Ordu to the west. Its area is 6,972 km^{2}, and its population is 450,862 (2022). The provincial capital is Giresun. Its license-plate code is 28.

== Geography ==
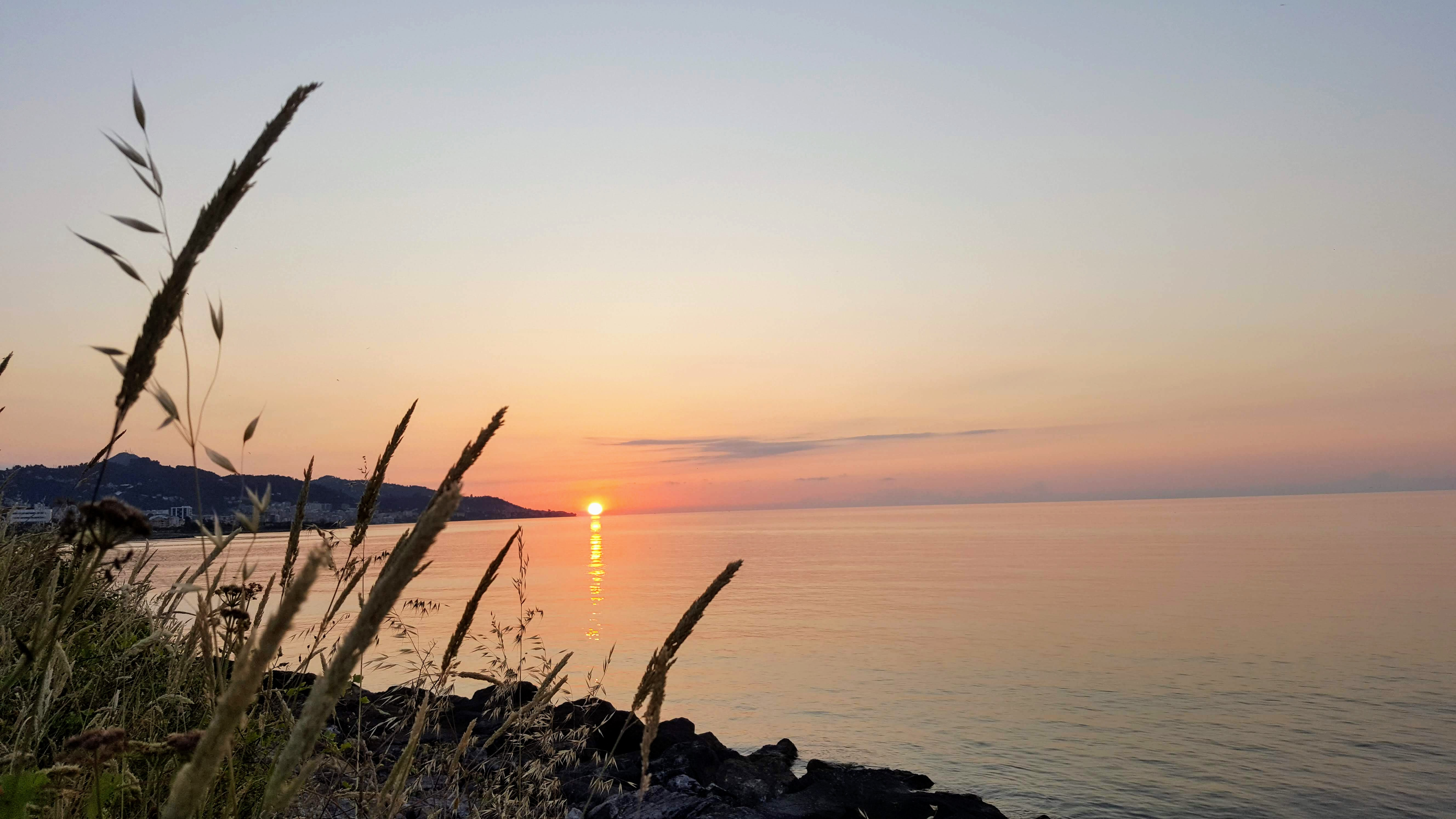
A sunset view on the coast of Giresun province

Giresun is an agricultural region and its lower areas, near the Black Sea coast. It is Turkey's second largest producer of hazelnuts and it is famously home to the best quality hazelnuts in the world; a Giresun folk song tells "I will not eat a single hazelnut, unless you are by my side," while another tells of a lover shot dead under a hazelnut tree.

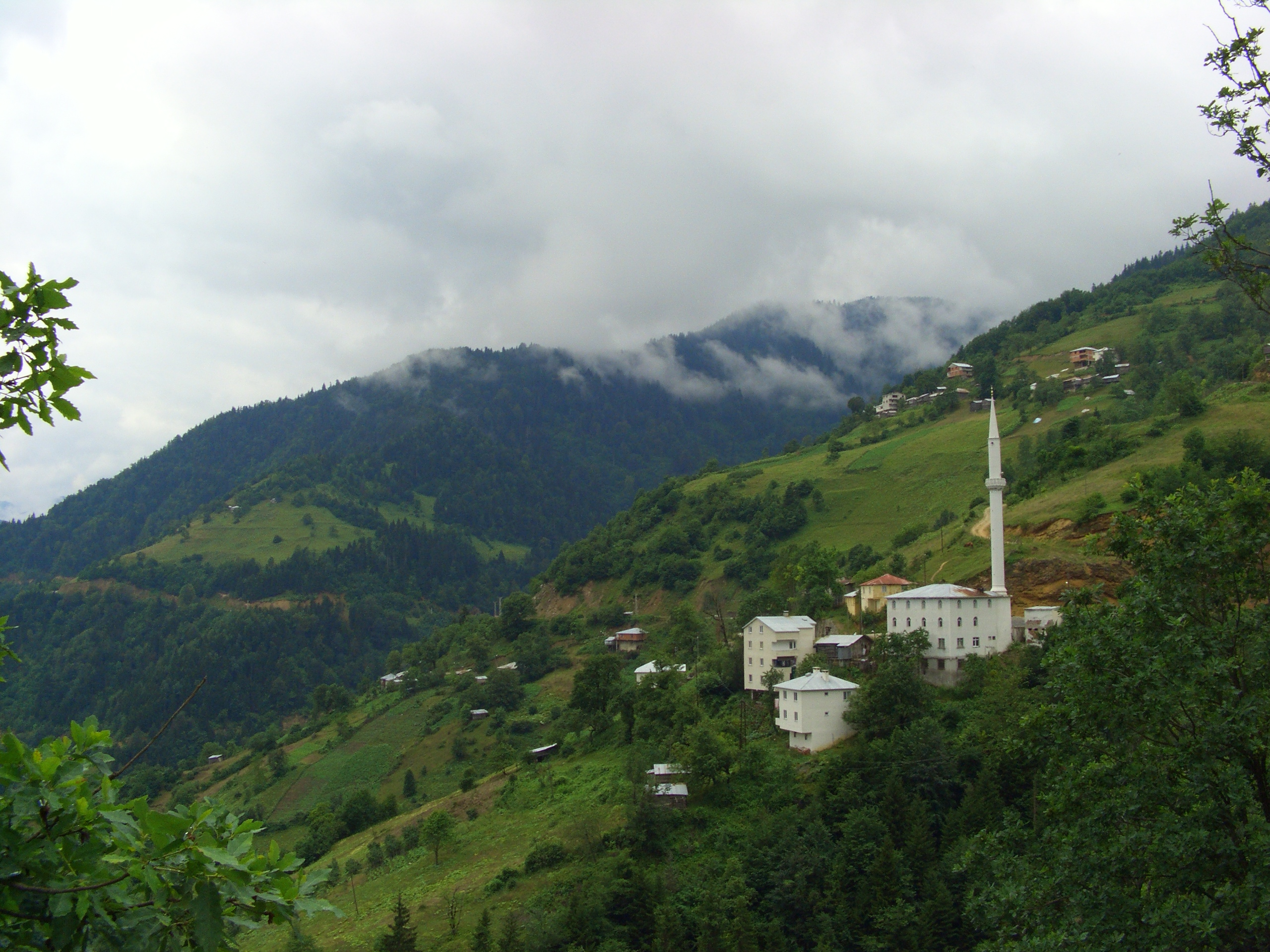
Pınarlar village

Forests and pasture cover the high mountainous regions, and in places there is mining of copper, zinc, iron and other metals. The mountain villages are remote, with poor roads and little else in the way of infrastructure. The hillsides are too steep for most forms of agriculture, and as a result, cornbread is the traditional meal, as wheat cannot be grown.

The climate is typical of this stretch of the Black Sea coast, i.e. very wet. Local flora includes bilberries (Turkish "taflan").

== Demographics ==
The province is traditionally inhabited mostly by Chepni Turks as well as a minority of Cheveneburi Georgians in select rural villages and towns.

Due to migration, more Giresunians live outside of Giresun than inside it.

== Districts ==
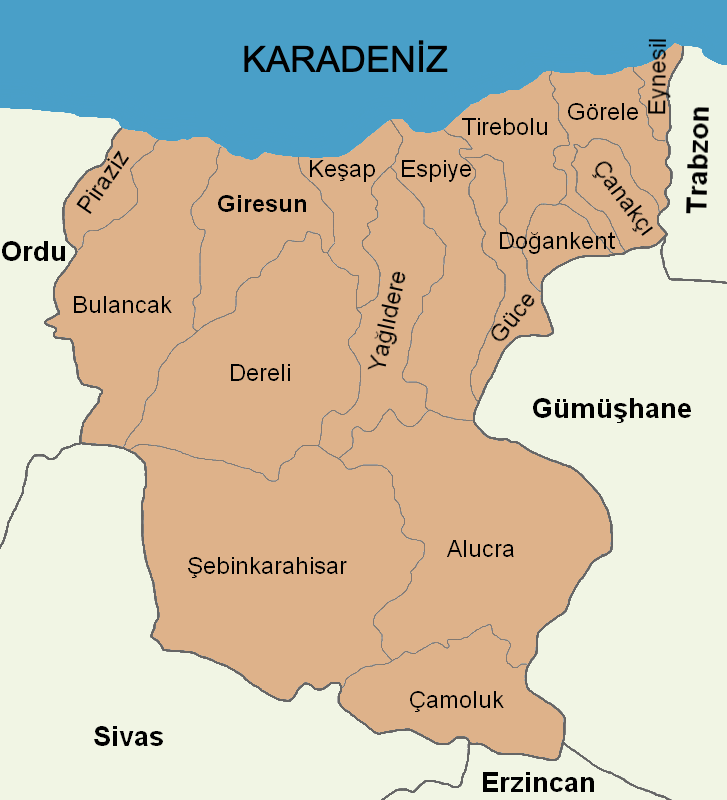

Giresun province is divided into 16 districts (capital district in bold):

- Alucra
- Bulancak
- Çamoluk
- Çanakçı
- Dereli
- Doğankent
- Espiye
- Eynesil
- **Giresun**
- Görele
- Güce
- Keşap
- Piraziz
- Şebinkarahisar
- Tirebolu
- Yağlıdere

== Culture ==
Giresun province is culturally divided into two regions from north to south. North Giresun having virtually the same culture as the neighbouring Ordu and Trabzon, while south Giresun (aka. the Şebinkarahisar region) being much closer to the neighbouring Sivas province and the Central Anatolia region. Because of the northern part dominating much of the province's economic and demographic sides, south of the province is more often than not ignored.

=== Handcrafts ===
Due to the dense forestry in Giresun, woodwork is among the common handcrafts in the region. Some small wooden handcrafts peculiar to the city are churns, külek (a storing pot for cheese), and spoons. One of the oldest handcrafts in the city is weaving. Wool, linen threads and similar raw materials are spun in handlooms to produce various local clothes, heybe (shoulder bags) and bags. Strong threads and knitted threads are also produced in handlooms.

=== Cuisine ===
Some of the dishes peculiar to the city are corn soup (Mısır çorbası), kale soup (kara lahana çorbası or pancar çorbası), cabbage leaves stuffed with a meat filling (etli lahana sarması or pancar sarması/dolması), black cabbage dish (karalahana yemeği or pancar yemeği), pilaf with anchovy (hamsili pilav), pilaf with cabbage (dible), kaygana, kuymak (made of cheese, cornmeal and butter)

== Places of interest ==
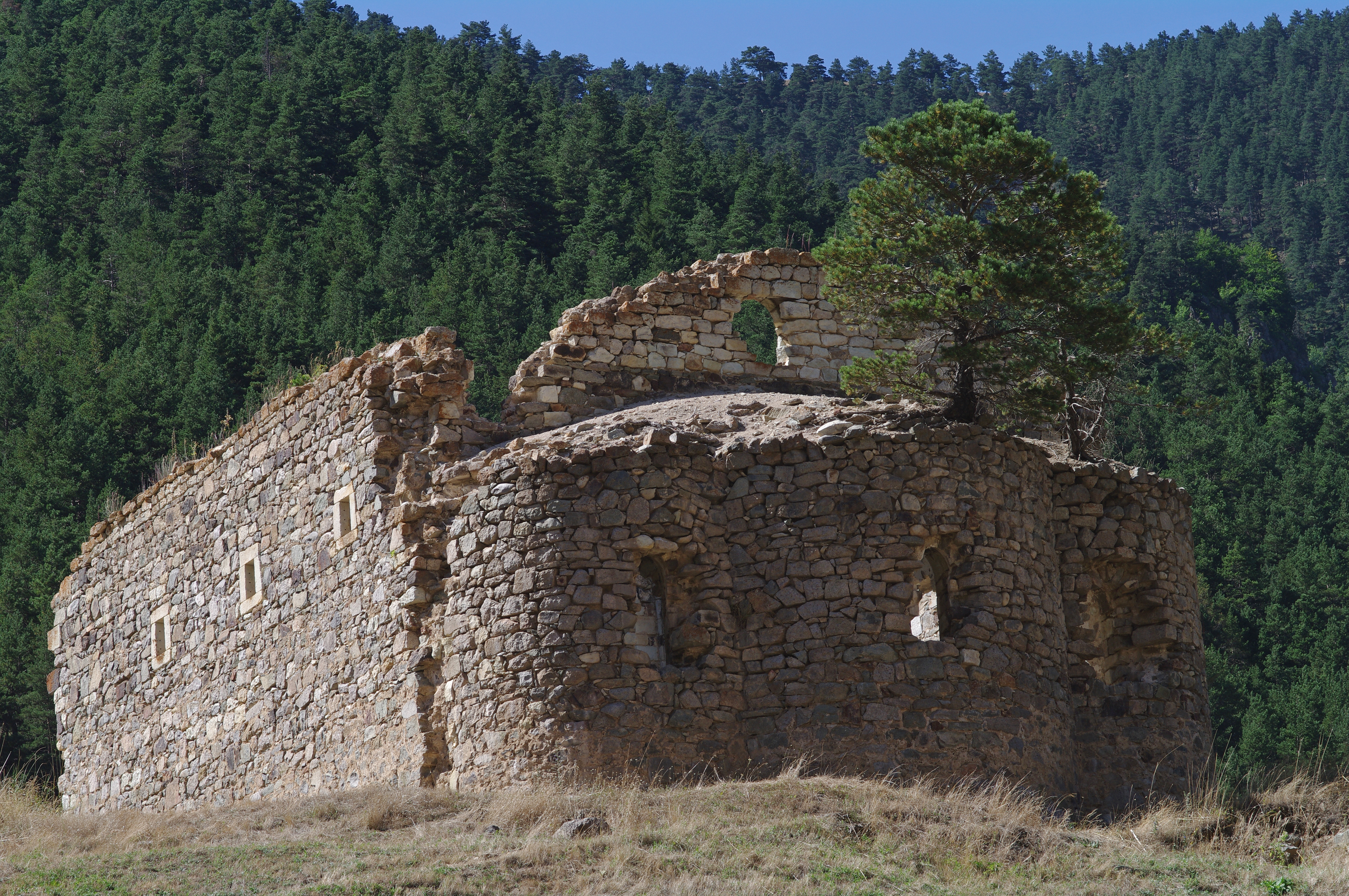
Çakrak church in Çakrak, Alucra.

- Kuşköy, ("Village of the Birds") is known for the famous 400-year-old whistled language that is used by the local residents.
- Kırkharman Kilisesi, a former Greek church also known as the Church of Prophet Elias.
- Kümbet, Karagöl and Bektaş are areas of an attractive mountain pasture in the district of Dereli, where people can enjoy walks and picnics. Annual folklore festivals are held here in Summer.
- Çakrak Kilisesi
- Kuzalan Falls
- Tripoles Castle
- Giresun Museum
- Giresun Castle
- Tirebolu Castle
- Şebinkarahisar Castle
- Atatürk's House Museum (Şebinkarahisar)

== Notable residents ==
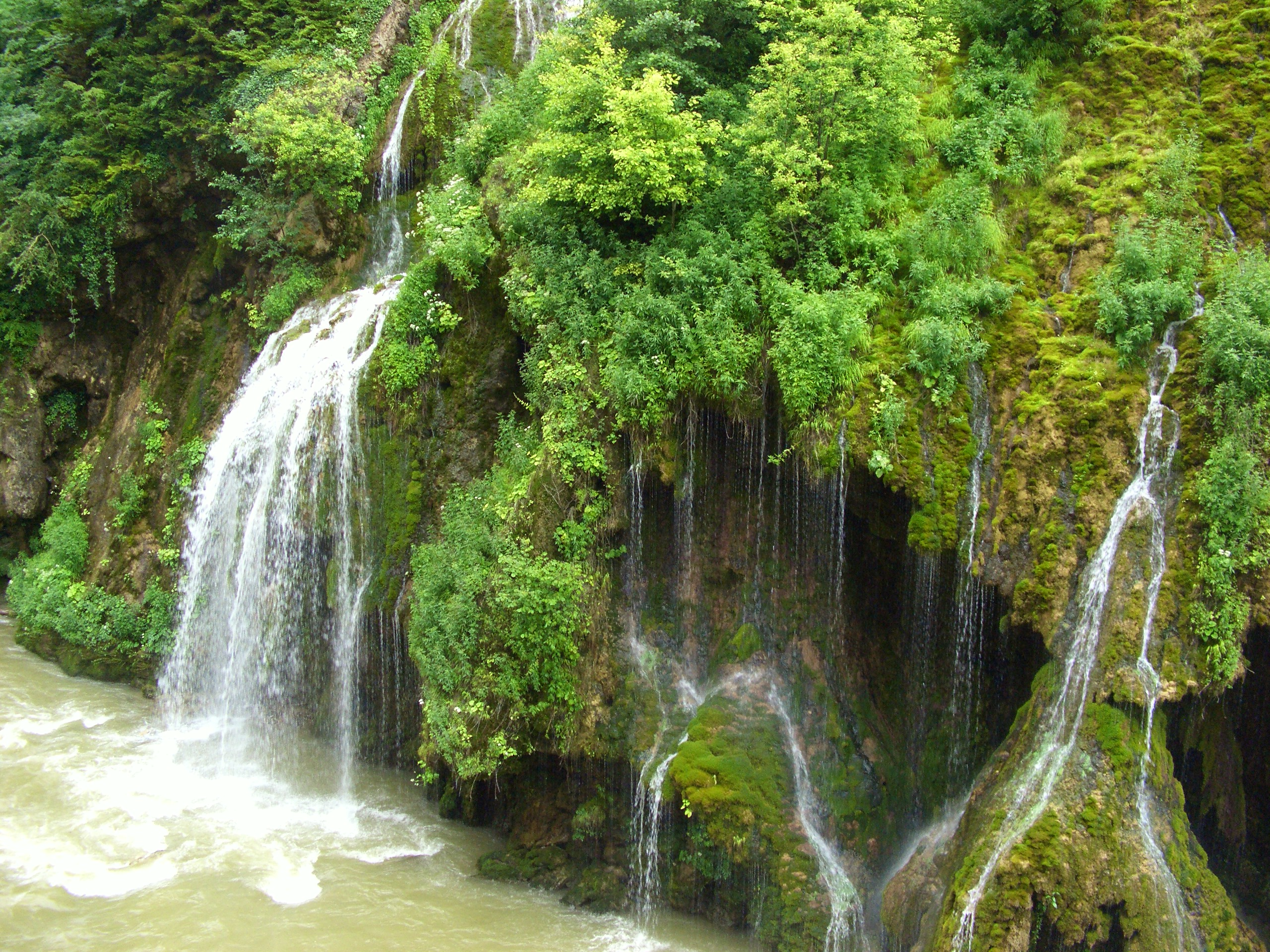
Aksu stream, Giresun

=== Politicians ===
- Rahşan Ecevit (1923, Bursa - 2020), wife of former Turkish Prime Minister, Bülent Ecevit, born to a Şebinkarahisar family
- Hayrettin Erkmen (b Tirebolu - ), former foreign minister
- Harun Karadeniz (1942, Alucra - 1975), writer and student activist leader of the 1968 generation
- İdris Küçükömer (1925, Giresun - 1987), economist and thinker
- Topal Osman (1883, Giresun - 2 Nisan 1923, Ankara), soldier and commander in the Turkish War of Independence
- Mustafa Suphi (1883, Giresun - 1921), founder of the Communist Party of Turkey
- Hasan Âli Yücel (1897, İstanbul – 1961), poet, thinker, and politician, former minister of education, born to a Görele family

=== Writers and artists ===
- Hulki Cevizoğlu (b 1958, Giresun - ), journalist, TV presenter and producer, specialises in political debate
- Bedri Rahmi Eyüboğlu (1913, Görele - 1975, Istanbul), painter and poet
- İlyas İlbey, actor, husband of Yasemin Yalçın
- Fatih Kırtorun (1985, Görele - ), writer and poet
- Salih Memecan (1952, Giresun - ), cartoonist of Sabah newspaper
- Aziz Nesin (1915, Şebinkarahisar - 1995), writer and journalist
- Yaman Okay (b 1951, Giresun -), actor and film director
- Öztürk Serengil, well-known film actor, father of Seren Serengil, grew up in Giresun
- Ahmet Yalçınkaya (b 1963, Giresun ), poet

=== Musicians ===
Giresun province shares the folk music of the Black Sea region and is the birthplace of:

- Picoğlu Osman (b. 1901, Görele - d. 1946 Amasra), folk musician, prominent kemençe players
- Katip Şadi (b 1932, Görele -), folk musician, kemençe player

Other musicians include:

- Ozan Arif (1949, Alucra - ), poet, lyricist, balladeer of the extreme right MHP
- Mustafa Küçük, folk-arabesk musician
- Teoman (1967, Alucra - ), rock singer

=== Sports people ===
- Şenes Erzik (1942, Giresun -), businessman and vice president of UEFA
- Hasan Gemici, 1952 Olympic gold medalist in freestyle wrestling
- Giresunspor, Once played in the Highest Division, now competes in the amateur league
- Tolga Seyhan (b 1977 -) and Gökdeniz Karadeniz (b 1980 Giresun, currently with Rubin Kazan), footballers

== Giresun in popular culture ==
- The TV series Uy Başuma Gelenler was filmed in the village of Düzköy. It is the story of a young man from Istanbul who inherits a hazelnut grove in Giresun (a Turkish twist on Monarch of the Glen).
- The folk song "Giresun üstünde vapur bağrıyor" ("Eşref Bey Ağıtı") has been recorded by a number of artists including Ismail Hakkı Demircioğlu, and tells of a wounded soldier dying in Giresun.
- "Giresun'un içinde" has been sung by Musa Eroğlu, Selda Bağcan and Fuat Saka, who also sang "Lazutlar," which means corn in the local dialect and is a kind of Cider with Rosie rural idyll in verse.
- Ahmet Kaya sang "Mican," a ballad about a local bandit in the mountains.

== See also ==
- List of populated places in Giresun Province
