= List of municipalities in Giresun Province =

This is the List of municipalities in Giresun Province, Turkey as of March 2023.

District	Municipality
Alucra	Alucra
Bulancak	Aydındere
Bulancak	Bulancak
Bulancak	Kovanlık
Çamoluk	Çamoluk
Çanakçı	Çanakçı
Dereli	Dereli
Dereli	Yavuzkemal
Doğankent	Doğankent
Espiye	Espiye
Espiye	Soğukpınar
Eynesil	Eynesil
Eynesil	Ören
Giresun	Duroğlu
Giresun	Giresun
Görele	Çavuşlu
Görele	Görele
Güce	Güce
Keşap	Keşap
Piraziz	Piraziz
Şebinkarahisar	Şebinkarahisar
Tirebolu	Tirebolu
Yağlıdere	Üçtepe
Yağlıdere	Yağlıdere
