= Aksu, Giresun =

Aksu
- Village
- Location within Turkey
- Coordinates: 40°33′41″N 38°12′58″E
- Country: Turkey
- Province: Giresun
- District: Dereli
- Population (2022): 169
- Time zone: UTC+3 (TRT)

Aksu is a small village (köy in Turkish) of Dereli District of the Giresun Province of Turkey. Its population is 169 (2022). It is located in the upper basin of the Aksu Deresi stream.

== Aksu Festival ==
Aksu Şenliği (Aksu Festival) is an annual arts and culture festival organized by Giresun Municipality between 20 May and 23 May. This event is held in the mouth of Aksu Deresi in the east of Giresun's city center. Until 1977 it was celebrated as a provincial level conviviality with the name “Mayıs Yedisi (May 7)”. May 7, based on the Arabic Hegire Calendar (the equivalent of May 20 in the Julian day), is considered an ancient fest day that has a special meaning in Turkish traditions. In this date, some Shamanistic rituals are realized by the local people. The name of Mayıs Yedisi was replaced with Aksu Festivali (Festival of Aksu) in 1992, and it was celebrated as a national level festival. In order to attract foreign participants from abroad and taste of different ethnic cultures, the name of event was changed to “Uluslararası Karadeniz Giresun Aksu Festivali (International Giresun-Aksu Festival of Black Sea)” again. Since 1992, it has been organized as regional and international level event on folk culture and arts with mainly contributions from Black Sea countries such as Azerbaizhan, Georgia, Ukraine and Russia.

The rituals section of the festival consist of three main events in the first day after opening ceremony:

a) Jumping over a sacayak

Sacayak (pronounced such-i-uck) or Sacayağı is a Turkish word for an iron three-legged support for the Turkish Sac which is used to fry meat. Sacayak also can refer to the boilers and other cooking cups over fire in rural areas. The first ritual of the festival symbolizes the a fertility ritual for the human beings. Ancestors of Turks in ancient times believed that if they jumped three times over the fire they would have children, as the sacayak symbolized the women's uterus. It was believed that if women, particularly childless ones, jumped over a sacayak on 7 May they will conceive a child immediately if they wish for them during jumping.

b) Stoning the creek

In this ritual, people throw a total of 15 pebbles (7 pairs and one single) to the bed of Aksu Deresi. Seven is a very sacred number in Turkic beliefs. The last thrown single pebble is to enforce to happen the wishes. While they are throwing pebbles to Aksu stream, people says "Derdim, belam denize!" (nearly means "All troubles and messes, go away to the sea!"). It is believed in that the spring is a season that renews the nature, and is also time to cancel from all of bad things inside body and souls.

c) Cruising around the Giresun Adası

This is the last ritual of festival. The people turns around the Giresun Adası (Giresun Island). The tour with a boat begins and ends in front of Hamza Taşı.
