= Elmalı, Bulancak =

Elmalı
- Village
- Location in Turkey
- Coordinates: 40°47′N 38°07′E
- Country: Turkey
- Province: Giresun
- District: Bulancak
- Elevation: 508 m (1,667 ft)
- Population (2022): 454
- Time zone: UTC+3 (TRT)
- Postal code: 28302
- Area code: 0454

Elmalı is a village in the Bulancak District of Giresun Province, Turkey. Its population is 454 (2022).

== History ==
The name of the village is mentioned as Elmalu in the records of 1455.

== Geography ==
The village is 51 km from Giresun city center and 36 km from Bulancak district center. The village is in the southwest of Bulancak and is connected to the Bulancak-Kovanlık-Aydındere provincial road by a 5.7 km long village road.

== Population ==
Historical population
Year	Pop.	±% p.a.
1965	1,074	—
1985	990	−0.41%
1990	832	−3.42%
1997	729	−1.87%
2007	715	−0.19%
2012	612	−3.06%
2017	500	−3.96%
2022	454	−1.91%
Source: Population censuses (1965-1997) and TÜIK (2007-2022)
