= Bulancak District =

District of Giresun Province, Turkey

- District
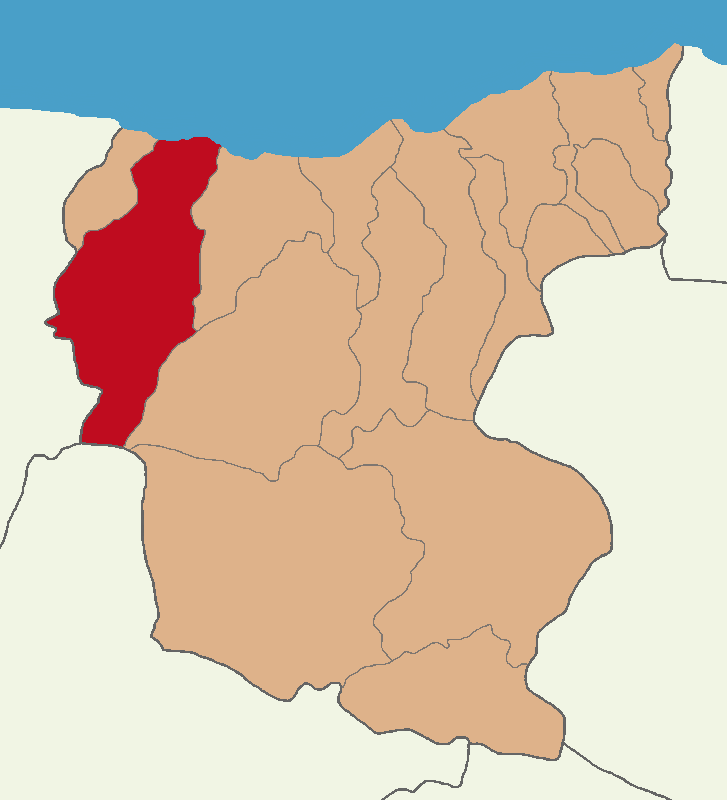
- Map showing Bulancak District in Giresun Province

- Location in Turkey
- Coordinates: 40°46′N 38°09′E
- Country: Turkey
- Province: Giresun
- Seat: Bulancak

Government
  - Kaymakam: Ünal Koç
- Area: 721 km^{2} (278 sq mi)
- Population (2022): 69,415
  - Density: 96/km^{2} (250/sq mi)
- Time zone: UTC+3 (TRT)
- Website: www.bulancak.gov.tr

Bulancak District is a district of the Giresun Province of Turkey. Its seat is the town of Bulancak. Its area is 721 km^{2}, and its population is 69,415 (2022). It neighbours the district of Piraziz which used to be a part of Bulancak, Altınordu district and Kabadüz districts of Ordu Province in the west, Giresun City in the east and the district of Dereli in the south.

== Composition ==
There are three municipalities in Bulancak District:

- Aydındere
- Bulancak
- Kovanlık

There are 58 villages in Bulancak District:

- Ahmetli
- Ardahan
- Ataköy
- Bahçeli
- Bayındır
- Bostanlı
- Burunucu
- Büyükada
- Cindi
- Damudere
- Demircili
- Döngeri
- Duttepe
- Elmalı
- Erdoğan
- Eriklik
- Esenköy
- Ezeltere
- Gültepe
- Gündoğdu
- Güneyköy
- Hacet
- Hisarkaya
- İcilli
- İnece
- Kalegüney
- Karaağaç
- Karacaresul
- Kayabaşı
- Kayadibi
- Kayhan
- Kışla
- Küçükada
- Küçükdere
- Küçüklü
- Kuşluhan
- Kuzköy
- Muratlı
- Odadüzü
- Pazarsuyu
- Samugüney
- Şeyhmusa
- Süme
- Talipli
- Tandır
- Tekmezar
- Tepecik
- Tepeören
- Tokmadin
- Torçan
- Yalıköy
- Yaslıbahçe
- Yeniköy
- Yeşilhisar
- Yeşilköy
- Yeşiltepe
- Yıldız
- Yunuslu
