= Yavuzkemal =

- Municipality
- Location in Turkey
- Coordinates: 40°38′N 38°19′E
- Country: Turkey
- Province: Giresun
- District: Dereli
- Elevation: 1,475 m (4,839 ft)
- Population (2022): 2,361
- Time zone: UTC+3 (TRT)
- Postal code: 28960
- Area code: 0454

Yavuzkemal is a town (belde) in the Dereli District, Giresun Province, Turkey. Its population is 2,361 (2022). It is a dispersed settlement, typical of Black Sea region, situated to the west of Aksu River. The distance to Dereli is 20 kilometres (12 mi) and to Giresun is 64 kilometres (40 mi). The settlement was founded by a Turkmen tribe named Kırık in the 14th century and the former name of the settlement was Nahiye'i Kırık (subdistrict of Kırık). According to official records of the Ottoman Empire the population of the settlement decreased in 1485 probably because some of the population was transferred to the newly conquered Trabzon (Trabzon Empire). The settlement was declared a seat of township in 1998.
