= Valavanis =

Valavanis (Greek: Βαλαβάνης), with the female form being Valavani (Βαλαβάνη) is a Greek surname. Notable people with the surname include:

- George Valavanis, Greek journalist and writer
- Nadia Valavani (born 1954), Greek politician and government minister
- Panos Valavanis (1954–2025), Greek classical archaeologist
- Stefan Valavanis (also known as Stefan T. Vail; died 1958), a Harvard econometrician
- William N. Valavanis (born 1951), American bonsai artist
