= Yalçınkaya =

Yalçınkaya is a Turkish surname. Notable people with the surname include:

- Abdurrahman Yalçınkaya, Turkish judge
- Ahmet Yalçınkaya, Turkish poet
- Atagün Yalçınkaya, Turkish boxer
- Bilal Yalcinkaya, German footballer of Turkish descent
