= Aymaç =

Nature park in the eastern Black Sea region of Turkey

Coordinates: 40.5737°N 38.41472°E

Aymaç (pronounced [ajmatʃ]) is a nature park in the Dereli district of Giresun Province located in the eastern Black Sea Region of Turkey. It was designated as Turkey's 222nd nature park on 21 September 2017.

It is located between the Kümbet and Uzundere villages of Dereli. From Giresun, it can be reached via a (52 km (32 mi)) asphalt road that starts at the east end of the city centre and heads south towards Dereli and Kümbet. This 42 hectares (100 acres) recreation area is primarily used for relaxation, trekking, and picnics. It is also the ceremony and entertainment place for International High Plateau Festivities of Kümbet. Aymaç is characterized by its pastures and a rich forest composed of oriental spruces (ladini in Turkish)).
