= İnece, Bulancak =

İnece
- Village
- Location within Turkey
- Country: Turkey
- Province: Giresun
- District: Bulancak
- Population (2022): 406
- Time zone: UTC+3 (TRT)

İnece is a village of Bulancak District, Giresun Province, Turkey. Its population is 406 (2022). It is almost 9 km from Bulancak town. The village has 7 districts.

İnece has natural beauties like Gelin Kayası, a naturally shaped rock thought to be shaped like a bride. There are markets in the village center. The center is known locally as "Kiran". There are two mosques in the village. Hazelnuts grow there. The villagers have many gardens. In İnece, there are many trees like other villages in the Black Sea region.
