= Çamlık, Giresun =

Çamlık
- Village
- Location in Turkey
- Coordinates: 40°46′47″N 38°17′24″E
- Country: Turkey
- Province: Giresun
- District: Giresun
- Population (2022): 228
- Time zone: UTC+3 (TRT)

Çamlık is a village in the Giresun District of Giresun Province. Its population is 228 (2022). It is 20 km from Giresun.

== Population ==
Historical population
Year	Pop.	±% p.a.
1997	241	—
2007	206	−1.56%
2012	193	−1.30%
2017	151	−4.79%
2022	228	+8.59%
Source: 1997 census and TÜIK (2007-2022)
