= Karagöl (Giresun) =

Karagöl (Turkish pronunciation: [kaˈɾaɟœl]) is an area in Giresun Province in the Black Sea region of Turkey. Karagöl is the common name for a mountain chain, its summit, a lake on it, a high plateau around it and a summer settlement in the plateau located in the southeast of Dereli district. The plateau is located near the meeting point of the provincial boundaries of Giresun, Ordu and Sivas provinces.

== Etymology ==
Karagöl is a compound word in Turkish. "Kara" means "black" and "göl" means "lake", hence "Karagöl" means "black lake" in Turkish. It appears dark blue because the lake on the Karagöl Mountains is very deep. For this reason it has been called as "Karagöl" due to the appearance of its surface color.

== Mountain ==
Karagöl Mountains (Turkish: Karagöl Dağları) is a chain of Giresun Mountains (Giresun Dağları) in the southeastern border of Dereli district of Giresun. It is the second highest peak of Giresun. The Karagöl summit of this mountain chain is 3,107 meters high.

== Lakes ==
Karagöl Lake
- Location within Turkey
- Location: Giresun Province
- Coordinates: 40°31′30″N 38°9′10″E
- Type: crater lake
- Basin countries: Turkey

There are several glacial lakes (nearly ten) on the hills and hillsides of Karagöl Dağları. Karagöl lake giving its name to the mountain is a crater lake on Karagöl Dağları. On the lower side of the Karagöl summit there is another lake called Aygır Gölü (Lake Aygır). On the eastern hillsides of Karagöl Dağları Bağırsak Gölü (Bağırsak Lake) is fed by the water of Karagöl lake nearby Eğrikaya Obası, a summer settlement. Camlı göl (Camli lake) is another lake on the northeastern side of Kırklar Tepesi (Kırklar Summit) that is located on the east end of Karagöl Dağları. Kırklar summit is 3040 meters high. In the west side of this summit there is Sağrak Göl (Sağrak Lake). There are many summer settlements such as Kanıağıl, Avşar, Giresun, Yukarı Belen and Aşağı Belen in the Sağrak valley starting below Sağrak Göl.
