= İngölü Barajı =

Dam in Giresun

Ingölü Dam is a dam completed in 1977 for irrigation purposes on Divrikçayır in Giresun.
