= İcilli, Bulancak =

İcilli
- Village
- Location in Turkey
- Coordinates: 40°51′N 38°12′E
- Country: Turkey
- Province: Giresun
- District: Bulancak
- Elevation: 562 m (1,844 ft)
- Population (2022): 480
- Time zone: UTC+3 (TRT)
- Postal code: 28302
- Area code: 0454

İcilli is a village of the Bulancak District of Giresun Province in Turkey. Its population is 480 (2022).

== History ==
The old name of the village is mentioned as İncirli in the records of 1902.

== Geography ==
The village is 30 km from Giresun city center and 15 km from Bulancak district center. The village is in the south of Bulancak and is connected to the district center via Ahmetli and Süme villages.

== Population ==
Historical population
Year	Pop.	±% p.a.
1965	1,674	—
1985	1,293	−1.28%
1990	998	−5.05%
1997	686	−5.21%
2007	482	−3.47%
2012	477	−0.21%
2017	420	−2.51%
2022	480	+2.71%
Source: Population censuses (1965-1997) and TÜIK (2007-2022)
