= Hamza Stone =

Boulder on Giresun Island, Turkey

Coordinates: 40.929°N 38.437°E

The Hamza Stone (Turkish: Hamza Taşı) is a large black-colored boulder on the eastern coast of Giresun Island in the Black Sea, located 1.2 km off the coast of the Turkish city of Giresun. The stone, known to locals since around 2000 BCE, symbolizes Cybele, an ancient Anatolian mother goddess.

The stone sits on a device, also made of stone, with three legs similar to a very short tripod (saçayak, "saç foot", in Turkish, derived from its use to elevate a saç (pan) above the ground). It is estimated that the Hamza Stone has been a wish stone since 4,000 years before the present. Today, the stone is visited as part of the Aksu Festival. The tour around Giresun Island begins in front of the stone and returns to it in the end. Traditionally, visitors to the stone would put their hands on it and make wishes. It is believed that childless women that put their hands on the stone would soon bear a child. Because the traditional Anatolian and Turkish fireplace (or hearth), composed of a saçayak and a fire, is considered a symbol of having a home and a family, the stone represents fertility.

== See also ==
- List of individual rocks
