= Giresun Museum =

Archaeology museum in Giresun, Turkey

- Giresun Müzesi
- Location of Giresun Museum in Turkey
- Established: 1988; 38 years ago
- Location: Zeytinlik mah. Giresun, Turkey
- Coordinates: 40°55′10″N 38°23′38″E
- Type: Archaeology, Ethnography
- Collections: Hellenistic period, Roman Empire, Byzantine Empire, Seljuk Empire, Ottoman Empire
- Collection size: 390 archaeologic 561 ethnographic
- Owner: Ministry of Culture and Tourism

Giresun Museum is a museum in Giresun, Turkey. The museum is in the Zeytinlik neighborhood of Giresun at 40°55′10″N 38°23′38″E. It is a historic basilica named Gogora Church built in the 18th century. It has been constructed with rectangular yellow and brown lime stones adjoined with iron cramps and lead. The main gate faces west. The basilica, abandoned in 1923, was used as a prison between 1948 and 1967 before being redesigned as a museum in 1988. Another building which was used as the clergy house to the north is the administration building.

The majority of items in the museum are from Hellenistic, Roman, Byzantine, Seljuks, and Ottoman eras. Some of the items are terracotta figurines, pottery, amphorae and coins. While the oldest item is dated to 3000 BCE, there is also collection of items from Erikliman excavations.

In the ethnography section, there are 19th century Ottoman items such as clothes, kitchen appliances, hamam (bath) articles, weapons and ornaments. In 1999, an exhibition was held about Topal Osman and his friends, figures of the Turkish War of Independence.
