= Kümbet Yaylası =

Kümbet (pronounced as "khu-em-bet") is a tourist attraction site in the Dereli district of Giresun Province, located in the Black Sea Region of Turkey.

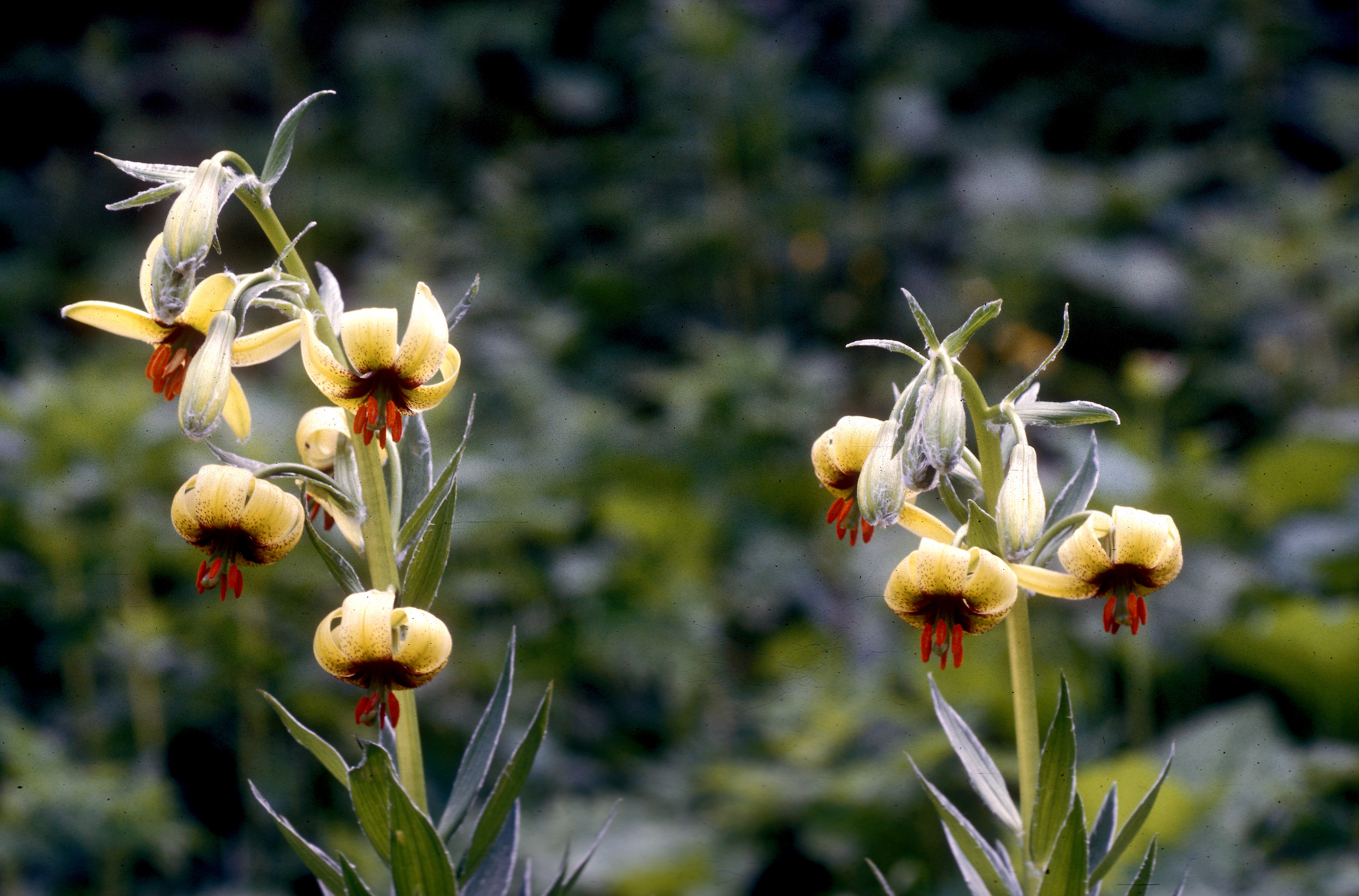
Lilies (Lilium ciliatum) in habitat at Kümbet by Ernst Gügel

== Etymology ==
In Iran and Turkey, where the Turks set up states and ruled for centuries, there are a number of examples of mausoleums. These monuments, referred to in Turkish as "kümbet"(gonbad), are a continuation of the Turkish burial customs of Central Asia. These structures are either polygonal or cylindrical in shape and are covered with a dome. The main body of the monument rests on a cubic base, the corners of which are bevelled. In the examples built before the 16th century the dome is covered with a conical or pyramidal spire. Most of these monuments are two storied. Concealed inside the base, half of which is below ground level, is a crypt; the latter is covered by a vault and its floor is earth. The deceased was buried in the earth. The crypt had small loop-hole windows.

== Description ==
Kümbet Yaylası ("Kuembet Plateau") is reached via Giresun-Dereli-Şebinkarahisar route which is 60 km from Giresun city centrum. The Plateau of Kümbet is 1640 meters high and its southern part is in Alpine zone. The plateau has three frequently visited sites. In addition to the central settlement called Kümbet, Salon Çayırı and Aymaç are the other attractive settlements in Kümbet Plateau. The Salon Çayırı ("Living Room Meadow") is a very nice forest recreation area nearly 1 km from Kümbet. Aymaç (pronounced "i-match") is located to the northeast of Kümbet village and is reached via a route of 2 km. Aymaç has several small and large flat grasslands/pastures covered with many beautiful wild species of flowers and herbs. Especially lilies (Lilium ciliatum), endemic to Black Sea and flowering in July are the distinguished species of the plateau. The area also has a very rich forest consisting dominantly of oriental spruces (Picea orientalis).

== Kümbet Plateau Festivity ==
This cultural festivity is organized in the Kümbet Plateau in second week (Friday, Saturday, Sunday) of July in every year. The festivity is celebrated in Aymaç in the plateau. Its original local name is Kümbet Yayla Şenlikleri.

== Kümbet Bazaar ==
Its most important feature making it different from other high plateau settlements is that Kümbet high plateau used both in winter and summer employs a function of a central bazaar function. During the summer season, every Friday, the day of the bazaar, population increases in Kümbet, where bungalows and predominantly two-floor houses are located. Another feature of Kümbet bazaar where many street vendors come from Giresun city and neighbouring administrative districts is the festivities called locally as Otçu Göçü Şenlikleri. Today this festivities is yearly organized as "Kümbet Yayla Şenlikleri" in the second weekend of July.
