= Giresun Island =

Island in Turkey

Coordinates: 40°55′44″N 38°26′10″E

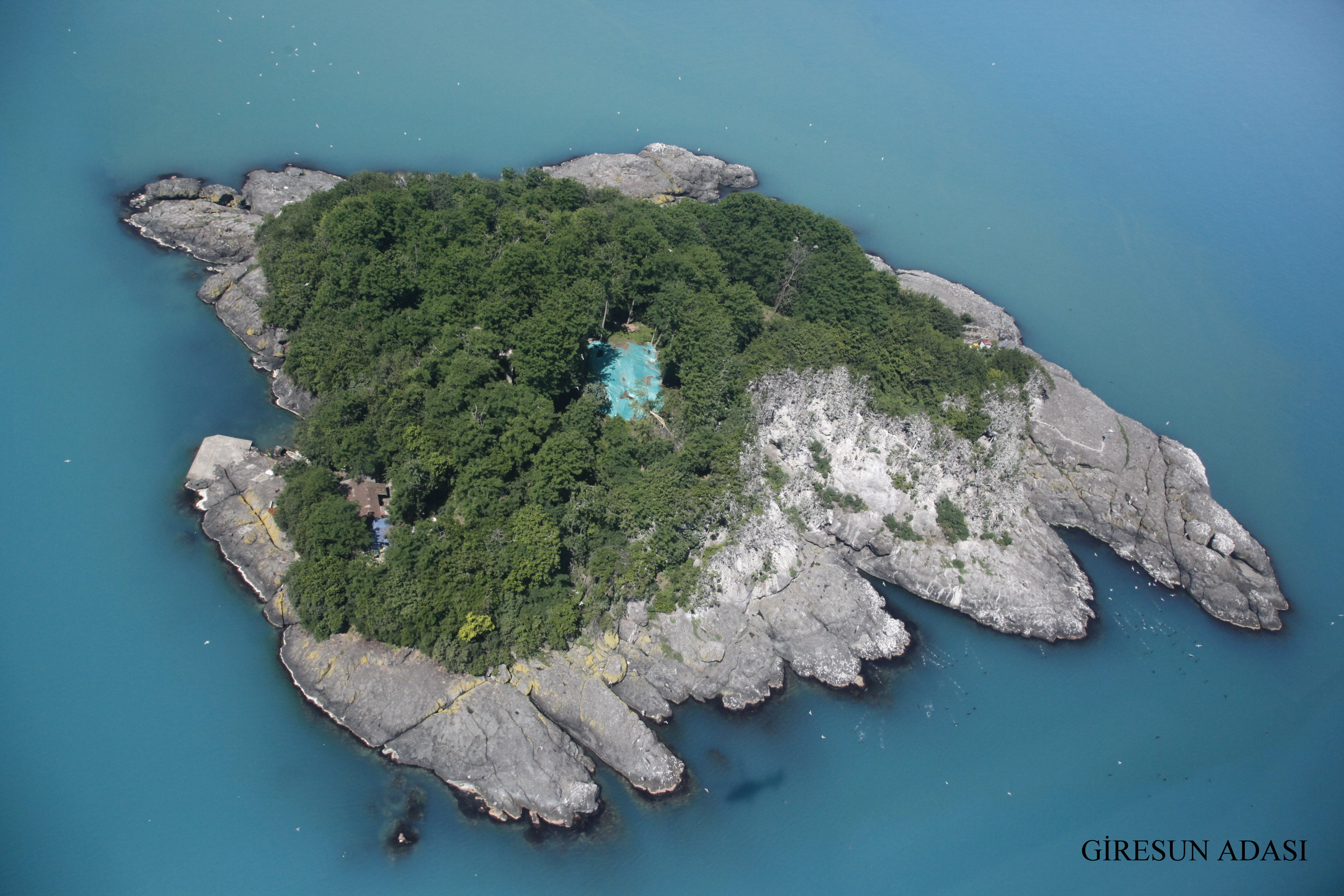
Giresun Island from sky.

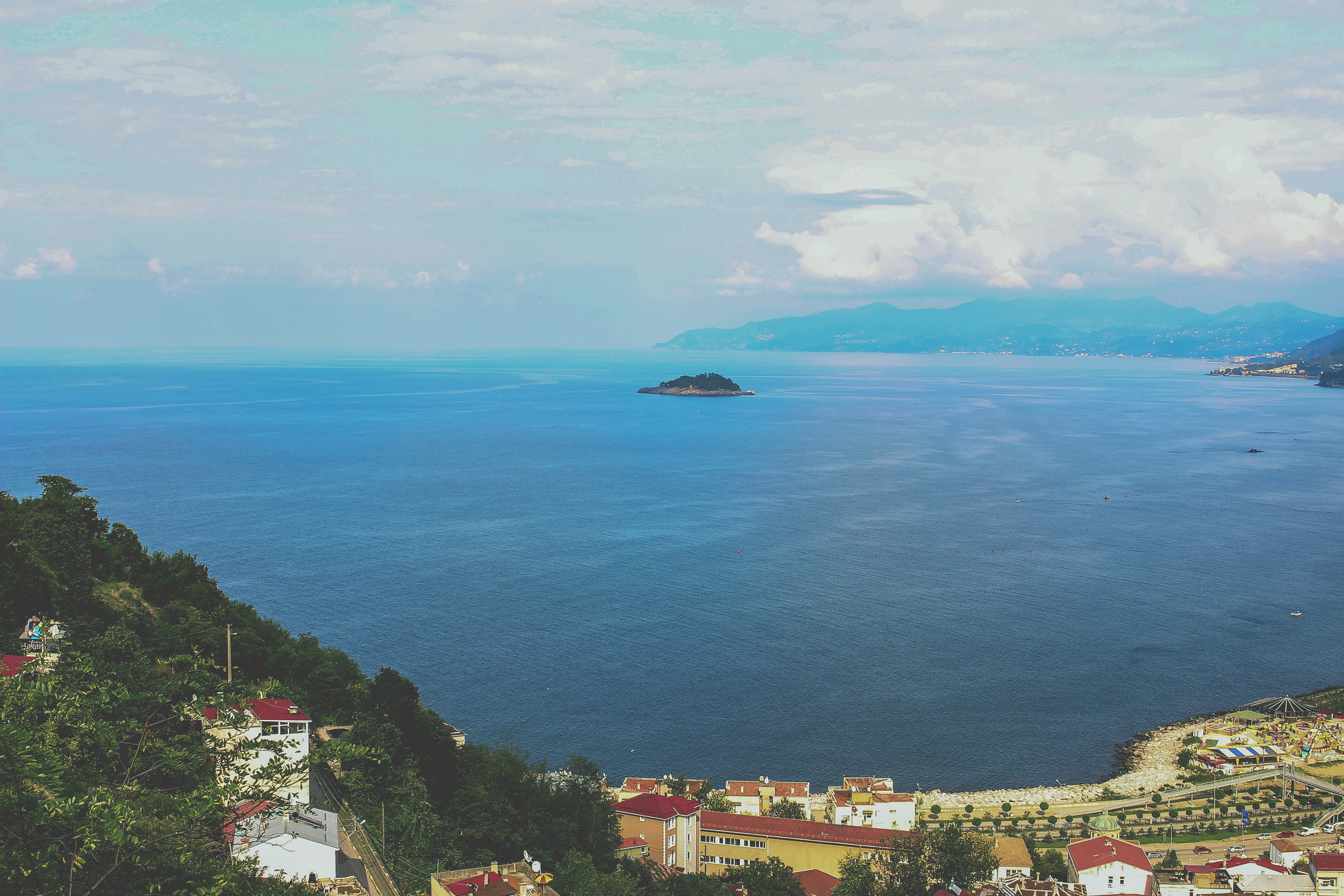
Giresun Island from Giresun Castle.

Giresun Island (Turkish: Giresun Adası) is a small island that has an area of 4 hectares and lies 1.2 km from the Turkish city of Giresun on the southeastern coast of Black Sea.

== History ==
Some of the island's ancient names are Aretias (Greek: Ἀρητιάς), Areos Nesos (Greek: Ἄρεος νῆσος) (means island of Ares), Chalceritis (Greek: Χαλκερίτις), and Puga. In historical times, the island was likely used by 6th or 5th century BC Greek colonists from the mainland city of Kerasous (presently the city of Giresun).

On the island are the ruins of a roofless stone temple, fortifications and ramparts, and two wine or oil presses. The roofless temple was in ancient times attributed to the Amazons who held religious rituals there. Archaeological studies suggest it was built in the Classical-Hellenistic era. A black round stone about 4 meters diameter, called Hamza Taşı in Turkish, is located in the ruins of the temple. In the present day, this stone is the starting point for a walk as part of the annual Aksu festival and it considered a wishing stone for fertility and health. Archaeology findings suggest the stone was sacred to a Roman stone cult or a Cybele Cult.

In the 1st century AD, the Romans erected a walled settlement with watch-towers as part of defending against pirate raids afflicting the dual-province of Pontus and Bithynia. In the mid-Byzantine era, approximately the 5th to 6th centuries, a monastery was constructed on the island. J. Philipp Fallmerayer, who visited the island in 1840, reports that the ruined monastery was dedicated to St. Phocas of Sinope. Anthony Bryer, however, identifies this monastery as the one dedicated to Eleousa, where the Metropolitan Joseph had taken refuge, only to become the victim of marauding Turkish pirates in 1368. Further construction of a castle-monastery complex and defensive ramparts were built between the 10th and 12th century AD. In 2015, during excavations ruins of a chapel from the 11th and 12th centuries were unearthed. In addition, many graves were found around the chapel. Archaeologists mentioned that it seems that during the Byzantine period the island was a religious center.

Bryer mentions the tradition that the Greeks living on this island continued to hold out against the Ottomans in spite of the fall of the Empire of Trebizond until 1468, making this island the last Greek realm of its age (except perhaps the Principality of Theodoro). After this year, human occupation of Giresun Island appears to have ended on orders of the Ottoman Empire who prohibited foreign trade, thus reducing the commercial sea traffic that had made the island relevant to commerce and naval defense.

For a long time Giresun Island has been preserved as a Class II historical and natural site by the Turkish government. Thus it is not allowed to be used as a residential area. Tourist visits to the island are possible on small and medium-sized fishing and cruise boats which can be provided by tourism agencies in Giresun.

== Geography and habitat ==
Giresun Island has approximately 40000 m^{2} land area. Like much of Giresun Province the island receives considerable precipitation and it is hot and humid in the summer. Its coast is mostly rocky and steep. There are two natural bays found to the north-east and south-east, the latter being an adequate harbour for small boats. Visitors can walk from this harbour up into the interior of the island.

While the dominant plants of Giresun are laurels (Laurus nobilis) and black locusts (Robinia pseudoacacia), it has been reported that the island has 71 wild and introduced species of trees and herbs. It is also a wild habitat for cormorants (Phalacrocoracidae sp.) and seagulls (Laridae sp.).

== In legend, literature, and film ==
Ancient Greek stories said the island was used by Amazons, the warrior women of legend, for fertility ceremonies centring on the temple (now in ruins). For this reason, the Giresun Island is also called Amazon Adası ("Amazon Island" or "Island of the Amazons"). The contemporary Turkish film Off Karadeniz alludes to the cultural legacy of the Amazons in relation to the island and the region.

Giresun Island, identified by the alternative name Aretias Island, is a setting for a portion of The Argonautica by Apollonius Rhodius. The tale of the Argonauts and the Golden Fleece is linked to the island. The navy troop called the Argonauts arrived on Aretias Island early in their quest to retrieve the Golden Fleece. Fierce birds using arrow-like feathers fought against the troops but were frightened away with the sound of swords clanging on shields. On the island, the Argonauts enlisted the help of four shipwrecked sailors who warned them of dangers in the Caucasus that might doom their quest.

A legend of King Mithridates VI of Pontus takes place on Giresun Island. The King was angry at his daughter for falling in love with a poor shepherd. He imprisoned his daughter on the island and hung the shepherd from a cherry tree in front of the prison tower. In grief, she committed suicide by hanging herself from the tower the next day.
