= George Valavanis =

Pontic Greek journalist, folklorist and author (1876–1941)

George K. Valavanis
- Γεώργιος Κ. Βαλαβάνης
- George K. Valavanis
- Born: 1876; Kerasous, Ottoman Empire
- Died: 1941 (aged 64–65)
- Occupations: Journalist, folklorist, author
- Writing career
- Language: Greek
- Subject: Pontic Greek culture
- Notable work: The Contemporary General History of Pontus (1925)

George K. Valavanis (Greek: Γεώργιος Κ. Βαλαβάνης; 1876–1941) was a Pontic Greek journalist, folklorist and author.

== Biography ==
=== Early life and career ===
George K. Valavanis was born in 1876 in Kerasous (modern day Giresun), where he also got an education. Despite his parents wishing for him to pursue the career of a merchant and tailor, he instead chose to become a journalist, as he was inspired by his folklorist uncle, Ioannes Valavanis. After completing his early education in Kerasous, Valavanis attended the prestigious Phrontisterion of Trapezous.

From 1911 to 1914, he published the weekly newspaper Aretias (Greek: Ἀρητιάς), named after Aretias, from the printing house of an Armenian named Vahan Pelagian.

=== Expulsion and later life ===
During the Pontic Greek genocide, he was sentenced to death by the Turkish National Movement, but managed to escape death. After the end of the Greco-Turkish War in 1922, he worked for the Ecumenical Patriarchate of Constantinople, where he helped treat Pontic Greek refugees. As he could not return to his city due to the 1923 population exchange, he helped organise the transfer of Pontic Greek refugees to Greece in Constantinople. Afterwards, he moved to Hymettus in Greece, where he was elected as president of the local community.

He continued to work as a journalist for newspapers and magazines, publishing articles concerning the history and folklore of Kerasous. He died in 1941 and the magazine Chronicles of Pontus wrote an article commemorating him in 1943.

== Works ==
=== List of works ===
- The Contemporary General History of Pontus (Greek: Σύγχρονος Γενική Ιστορία του Πόντου), published in Athens in 1925.
- Wedding songs and customs of Kerasous (Greek: Γαμήλια τραγούδια και έθιμα της Κερασούντας), published in the Pontic Papers in 1937.
- The origin of the Pontic name Poulantzakis (Greek: Πόθεν το όνομα Πουλαντζάκης του Πόντου), published in the Pontic Papers in 1938.

== Sources ==
- "Georgios K. Valavanis". Pontic Lyrics Digital Library.
