= Giresun District =

District of Giresun Province, Turkey

- District
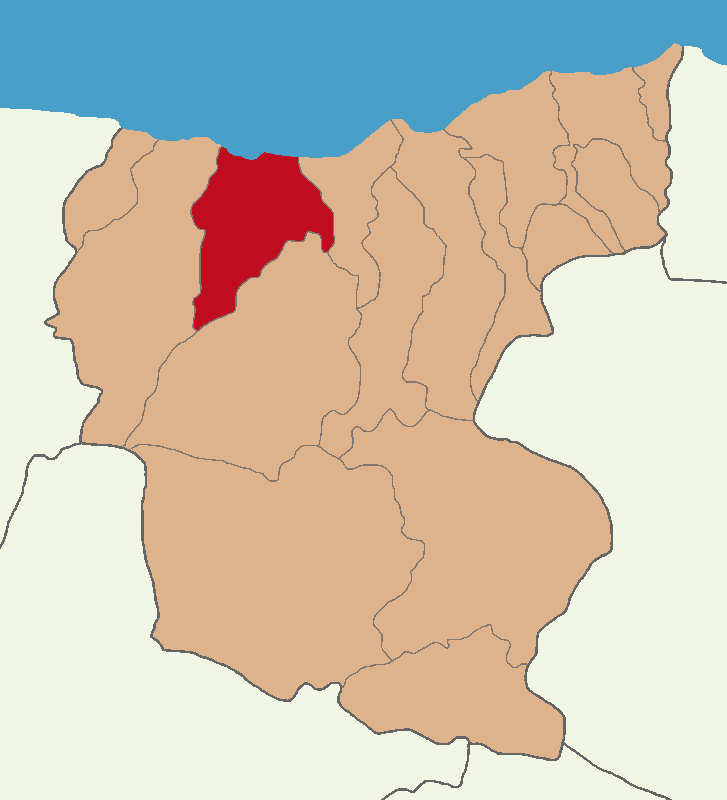
- Map showing Giresun District in Giresun Province

- Location in Turkey
- Coordinates: 40°54′N 38°23′E
- Country: Turkey
- Province: Giresun
- Seat: Giresun
- Area: 376 km^{2} (145 sq mi)
- Population (2022): 145,361
  - Density: 387/km^{2} (1,000/sq mi)
- Time zone: UTC+3 (TRT)

Giresun District (also: Merkez, meaning "central" in Turkish) is a district of the Giresun Province of Turkey. Its seat is the city of Giresun. Its area is 376 km^{2}, and its population is 145,361 (2022).

== Composition ==
There are two municipalities in Giresun District:

- Duroğlu
- Giresun

There are 53 villages in Giresun District:

- Akçalı
- Akıncı
- Akköy
- Alınca
- Anbaralan
- Barça
- Barçaçakırlı
- Bayazıt
- Boztekke
- Burhaniye
- Camili
- Çamlık
- Çandır
- Çavuşoğlu
- Çiçekli
- Çimşir
- Çukurköy
- Darıköy
- Ergence
- Eriklimanı
- Esentepe
- Evrenköy
- Gedikli
- Güney
- Gürköy
- Güveç
- Hamidiye
- Hisargeriş
- İncegeriş
- İnişdibi
- Karaali
- Kemaliye
- Lapa
- Melikli
- Mesudiye
- Okçu
- Orhaniye
- Ortaköy
- Osmaniye
- Pınarçukuru
- Sarvan
- Sayca
- Seyitköy
- Sıvacı
- Sultaniye
- Ülper
- Uzgur
- Uzkara
- Yağmurca
- Yaykınlık
- Yazlık
- Yenicehisar
- Yukarıalınlı
