= Dereli =

- Municipality
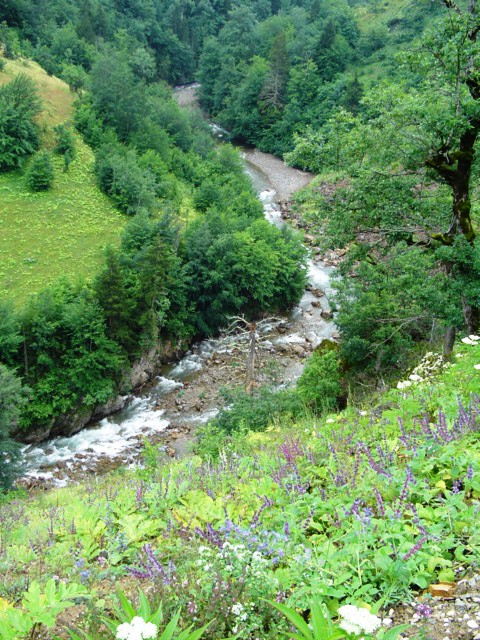
- Dereli stream

- Location within Turkey
- Coordinates: 40°44′20″N 38°26′55″E
- Country: Turkey
- Province: Giresun
- District: Dereli

Government
  - Mayor: Kazım Zeki Şenlikoğlu (AKP)
- Elevation: 346 m (1,135 ft)
- Population (2022): 5,879
- Time zone: UTC+3 (TRT)
- Postal code: 28950
- Area code: 0454
- Climate: Cfb
- Website: www.dereli.bel.tr

Dereli is a town in Giresun Province in the Black Sea region of Turkey. It is the seat of Dereli District. Its population is 5,879 (2022). The mayor is Kazım Zeki Şenlikoğlu (AKP).

Dereli is a small town in attractive countryside, in the valley of the Aksu Deresi and Akkaya River, 28 km inland from Giresun on the road to Şebinkarahisar.

== History ==
See Giresun for the history of this area, once occupied by the Hittites, Persians, Ancient Greek colonists from Miletos, Macedonians, Ancient Romans, Byzantines, Seljuk Turks, who settled in these valleys and arounds Muslim Kızılbaş, Turkmen Turks (Chepni) and finally the Ottoman Empire.

== Places to see ==
- Kümbet
- Salon Çayırı
- Aymaç
- Karagöl
