= Ahmet Yalçınkaya =

Turkish poet and academic (born 1963)

Ahmet Yalçınkaya (born December 1963) is a Turkish poet and academic.

Born in Giresun, Turkey, and grew up in Germany. Has studied Engineering, Robotics, management and business at various universities in Turkey, USA, Uzbekistan and Sweden. He lived in Europe, Turkey, and Central Asia. Lives and works today in Turkmenistan, and continues his studies, research, and teachings in Sweden.

His poems, essays, letters, interviews, poetry translations have been published by newspapers and journals like Zaman, Al-Ahram Weekly, Impact, Avaz, Harman, Das Licht, Maveran, Yosh Kuch, Kiragi, Endulus, Poezia, Carmina Balcanica and others in Turkey, Germany, England, Egypt, Romania and Uzbekistan. Has been awarded with several prizes. Has represented Kiragi (Hoarfrost) Poetry Journal in Istanbul (1995–97). Has taken part in the editorial board of the literary journal Endulus (Andalusia) (1997–98). Edited and published for a short time (1995) the literary journal Mevsim (The Season).

Some of his poems have been translated into languages such as English, Uzbek, Arabic, Tamil, Turkmen language, Azerbaijani, Romanian, German, and published abroad.

== Works ==
- Daglarda Yer Yok (Poems, 1997, "There is not any place in the mountains"), ISBN 978-975-7047-05-6.
- Yetim Kalan Siirler (Poems, 2001, "Orphan Poems")
- Yuragimning ko`z yoshi (Selected Poems, 2001, in Uzbek, "Tears of my Heart"), ISBN 978-5-633-01241-5.
- Özlem Sularında (Selected Poems, "In the Waters of Longing", e-book, 2004, printed, 2005), ISBN 978-1-4116-2869-4.
- Poems of the Night (Anthology, with Richard Mildstone, 2005, 2008, ISBN 978-1-4404-1627-9.)

In addition to the above literary works, has also works in technical and management fields.

== Sources ==
- [Işık, İhsan; Türkiye Edebiyatçılar ve Kültür Adamları Ansiklopedisi 10 Cilt, Elvan Yayınları; Ankara, 2006, ISBN 978-975-00315-2-6.]
- [Özbay, Adem; Türk Şiiri Antolojisi, Sarmaşık Yayınları, İstanbul, 2001.]
- [Ünlü, Özcan; Yüz Yıllık Türk Şiir Atlası, 2 Cilt, Birey Yayıncılık, İstanbul, 2004.]
- [Durman, Nurettin; Filistin Şiirleri Antolojisi, Anka Yayınları,İstanbul, Haziran 2001,ISBN 978-975-6628-12-6.]
- [Kasır, H.Ali; Çocuk Şiirleri, Düşün Yayınları; Çocuk Kitapları,İstanbul, 2000.] ISBN 978-975-550-144-4.]
- [Naz, Necmi; Çağdaş Anadolu Türk Edebiyatı Çocuk Şiirleri Antolojisi, X Yayınları, İstanbul, 2003, ISBN 978-975-7201-28-1.]
- [İzdüşüm II, Anafilya, havuz.de, 2005, Netherlands.]
- [Shodmanov, Alisher; "Shoir bilan muloqat", Pop Tongi, Namangan, Uzbekistan, 8 va 10 Iyun 2001, p. 8]
- [Marutham, Adhavan; "Turkish and Uzbek Poetry: Examples", Bharathiar University, 2008, Tamil Nadu, India]
