= Aydındere =

- Municipality
- Location in Turkey
- Coordinates: 40°40′N 38°04′E
- Country: Turkey
- Province: Giresun
- District: Bulancak
- Elevation: 1,320 m (4,330 ft)
- Population (2022): 2,189
- Time zone: UTC+3 (TRT)
- Postal code: 28310
- Area code: 0454

Aydındere is a town (belde) in the Bulancak District, Giresun Province, Turkey. Its population is 2,189 (2022).

== Geography ==
Although geographically a town of Black Sea Region, Aydındere is situated in the mountainous area far from the coast. The distance to Bulancak is 52 kilometres (32 mi) and to Giresun is 70 kilometres (43 mi).

== History ==
Prior to 14th century, Aydındere was a Byzantine village. In 1380 it was captured by Eretna Beylik, a beylik (principality) in Central Anatolia. In the 15th century it was annexed to the Ottoman Empire. During the Turkish Republic era there were two villages instead of Aydındere. One village named Kızılev (red house) and the other Derecikalan (region of the creek) . In 1987 Kızılev was renamed as Aydınlar. In 1999 the two villages were merged to form a town and the town was named as Aydındere.

== Economy ==
The most important crop of the town is hazelnut. Potato is also produced . Beehiving is another economic sector. But, carpet weaving, once popular, has declined.
