= Giresun Castle =

Castle in northern Turkey

Giresun Castle is a fortress built in the 2nd century BC in what is now Giresun Province, Turkey.

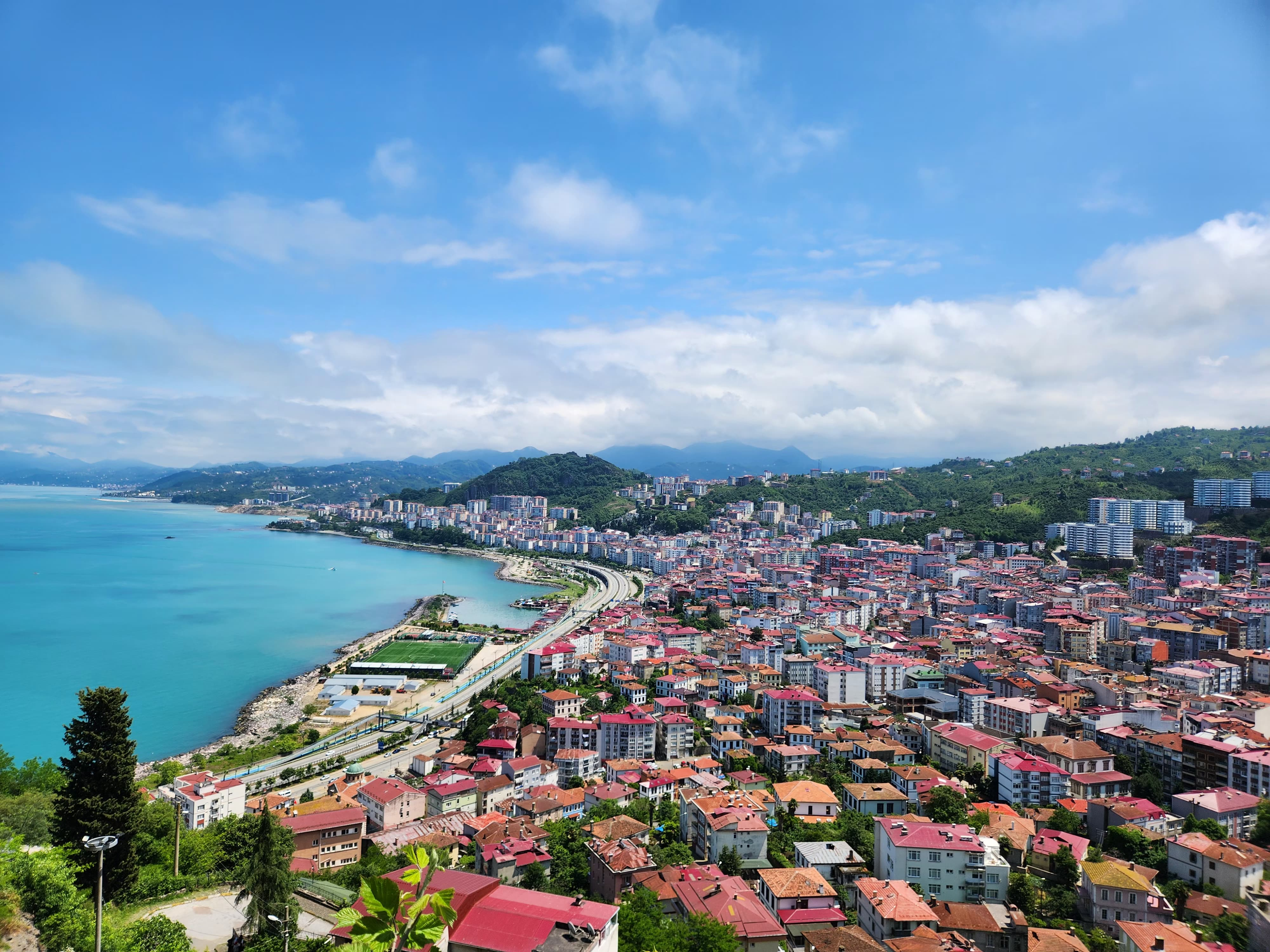
Giresun Castle.

== History ==
Giresun Castle was built on the order of Pharnaces I of Pontus (king of Kingdom of Pontus and son of Mithridates III of Pontus). Then, city was named "Farnakyas". Afterwards, the Roman Empire invaded the city (63 BCE) and the city took back the name Kerasus or Cerasus (the name was used since ancient times. Over time, it changed to Giresun).

== Transportation ==
Going to Giresun Castle is very convenient. It is possible to go to Giresun Castle on foot from the city center. It takes about thirty minutes. On the other hand, there are mini buses from several different locations to the castle.

== Facilities ==
Entry is free. At the highest point of the castle, there is the tomb of Atatürk’s personal guard, Topal Osman. On the northern side, there is the Martyr's Cemetery and the tomb of Kurbande, a follower of Haci Bektash Veli. Giresun Museum is about ten minutes away by car.
