= Bulancak =

- Municipality
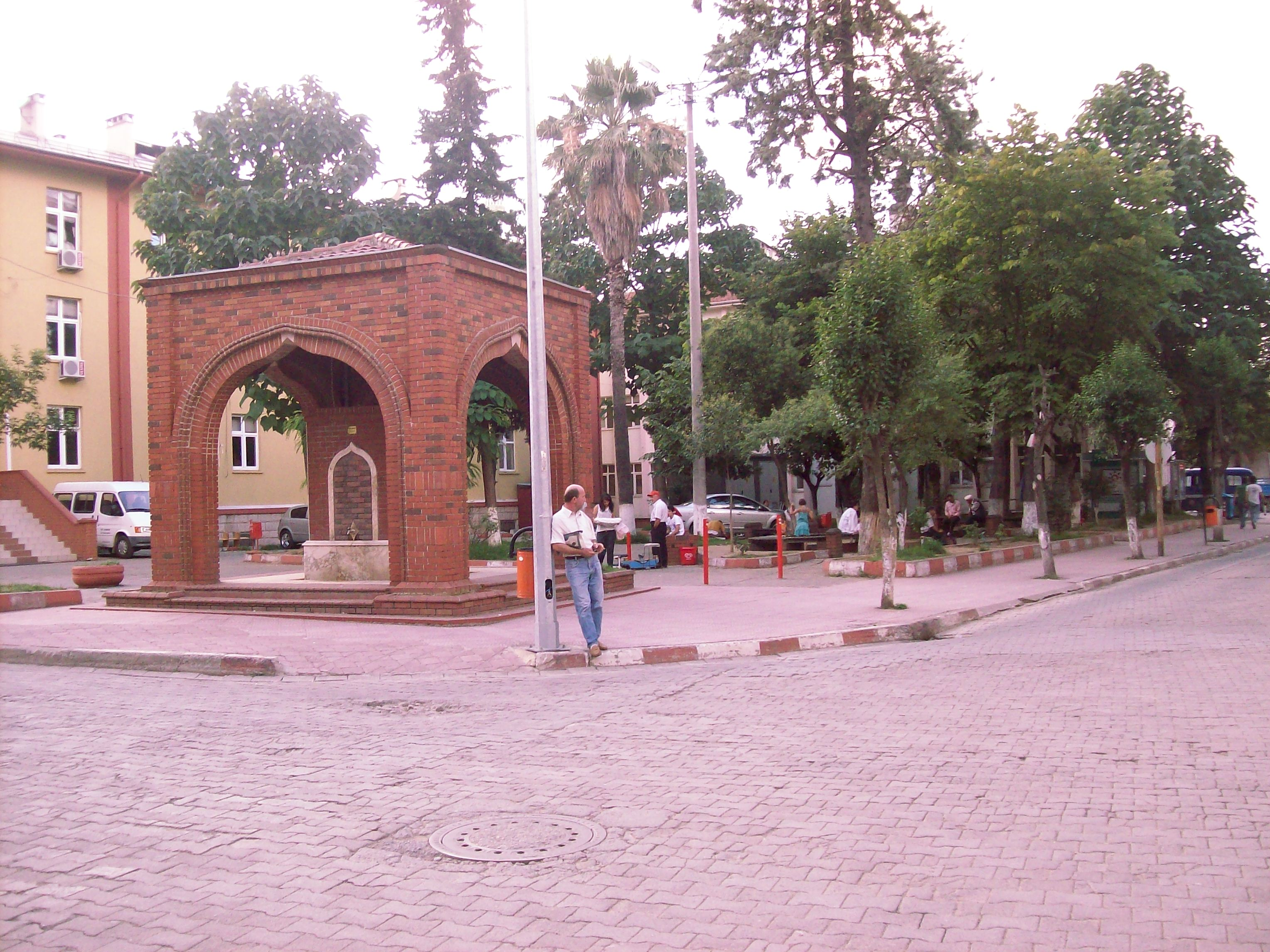

- Location within Turkey
- Coordinates: 40°56′N 38°14′E
- Country: Turkey
- Province: Giresun
- District: Bulancak

Government
  - Mayor: Necmi Sibiç (CHP)
- Elevation: 112 m (367 ft)
- Population (2022): 49,053
- Time zone: UTC+3 (TRT)
- Postal code: 28300
- Area code: 0454
- Climate: Cfa
- Website: www.bulancak.bel.tr

Bulancak (Georgian: ბულანჩაკი) is a town in Giresun Province on the Black Sea coast of Turkey, near the city of Giresun. Its former name is Terastios. It is the seat of Bulancak District. Its population is 49,053 (2022).

The municipality was established in 1887 and became a district seat in 1934. Because of its closeness to Giresun City, it is easily reachable by public transport and thus Bulancak can be considered a part of Giresun City's metropolitan area. Bulancak's general economy is based on fishing and agriculture. The main agricultural product in the district is hazelnuts, and is traditionally the main means of income for the people of the region.

The football club Bulancakspor is from the area.

== History ==
The known history of the region goes back to the Hittites. While the region was under the rule of the Hittites in 1400-1200 BC, the Trabzon-Erzurum-Giresun regions were called "the land of the Azzi". The Milesians who were traders along the Aegean Region in antiquity established their trading colony of Kerasous, which the city and province of Giresun gets its name from, approximately around the modern town of Bulancak.

The Giresun area came under the rule of the Persian Empire in the 4th century BC, and then passed over to the rule of the Macedonians. In the 2nd and 1st centuries BC, the Kingdom of Pontus dominated the region. In 61 BC, when the Pontian King Mithridates the Great was defeated by the Roman Commander Lucullus, the city and local administration came under Roman rule.

When the Roman Empire was divided into two in AD 395, the Bulancak region came under the rule of the Eastern Roman Empire. When Constantinople, the capital of the Eastern Roman Empire, was invaded by the Crusaders in the 11th century AD, the children of Emperor Manuel Kommenos came to Trebizond and established the Empire of Trebizond, with modern-day city of Trabzon as the capital, in 1204 AD. Bulancak also remained within the borders of this state, and the city was named "Terastios" during the Komnenos period.

During the Seljuk period, the Turcomans, who came from Central Asia and Khorasan started the conquest of Anatolia, also brought the Black Sea coasts under Turkish domination. As a result of the weakening of the Sultanate of Rum during the Crusades, the coastline passed from the hands of the Turks to the Empire of Trebizond, which was established in 1204 AD. In 1277 AD, the Chepni, a branch of the Oghuz Turks who came to Anatolia, first took the ancient Sinope region. Meanwhile, Mongolian pressure was weakening in Anatolia. Later, they came to dominate the entire Canik area (Central Black Sea region).

60–65 years after the conquest, in 1455, Terástios, an administrative unit that came under the jurisdiction of a Naiblik, that is, under the administration of Kadı Naibi, according to the census conducted in the same year, was the hometown of Mustafa Kethüda, Şemsettin Kethüda and Çakıroğlu Pir Kadem Kethüda. According to the registration, however, in urban areas such as Giresun City and Tirebolu, trade was in the hands of Greeks and Armenians, since Turks were conscripted into the military.

During the Beylik of Hacı Emir (Murad II period), the region came under the rule of the Ottoman Empire, and with the capture of Trebizond in the period of Mehmed the Conqueror in 1461, the entirety of the Black Sea Region became part of the Ottomans. When the region passed to the Ottoman Empire, its name was changed to Akköy.

== Administrative history ==
While the district of Bulancak was a part of Giresun City under the name of "Akköy", a municipality was established in the town in 1887 and then graduated on to become a district in 1934. It is known that Chepni Turks and Pontic Greeks lived here, some Laz from Rize and Artvin also immigrated to the region in the 1900s, and after the war of '93, many refugees from Batumi and the surrounding area settled in the region. (Yunuslu and Süme villages)

== Geography ==
The geographical structure of the town reflects the characteristics of the typical Black Sea geographical structure. A rapid rise starts some 20m off from the coast, so the terrain is very rough.

It is very rich in vegetation, and hazelnut orchards from the coast constitute the majority of the vegetation and cover up to an altitude of 2000 meters. From the coast, chestnut forests begin and forest plants such as alder, elm, hornbeam, poplar and linden can be seen in places. Again, as you go inland from the coast, the vegetation changes depending on the altitude, respectively, oak, hornbeam, spruce, fir and pine forests can be seen.

== Notable natives ==
- Sıla Koloğlu (born 2004), sprinter
