= Duroğlu =

- Municipality
- Location in Turkey
- Coordinates: 40°50′20″N 38°28′17″E
- Country: Turkey
- Province: Giresun
- District: Giresun
- Elevation: 80 m (260 ft)
- Population (2022): 3,032
- Time zone: UTC+3 (TRT)
- Postal code: 28030
- Area code: 0454

Duroğlu is a town (belde) in the Giresun District, Giresun Province, Turkey. Its population is 3,032 (2022). Duroğlu is situated along the Aksu River. It is 8 kilometres (5.0 mi) north of Giresun and the Black Sea coast. The town which is thought to be five centuries old was probably a caravan stop between the Black Sea coast and Central Anatolia in the historical times.
