= Kovanlık =

- Municipality
- Location in Turkey
- Coordinates: 40°44′48″N 38°07′36″E
- Country: Turkey
- Province: Giresun
- District: Bulancak
- Population (2022): 2,498
- Time zone: UTC+3 (TRT)

Kovanlık is a town (belde) in the Bulancak District, Giresun Province, Turkey. Its population is 2,498 (2022).
