= Aksu Deresi =

Coordinates: 40.5623°N 38.2138°E

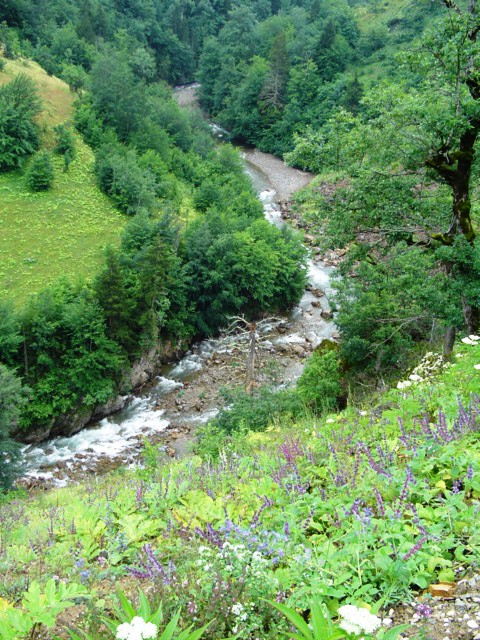
- A view of Aksu Deresi near Pınarlar village in Dereli

Location
- Country: Turkey

Physical characteristics
- Source
  - location: Karagöl
- Mouth
  - location: Black Sea

Aksu is one of the main water streams of Giresun Province in the eastern Black Sea Region of Turkey. Its name is Turkish for "white water".

== Description ==
Aksu Deresi rises in Karagöl, a rural highland area located very near to provincial borders of Giresun, Ordu and Sivas provinces. Karagöl is a chain of mountains which is part of the Giresun mountains, in the south of Dereli district of Giresun, and its summit is 3107 meters high. There is a crater lake on its summit, at 3,107 metres (10,194 ft) above sea level. The Aksu creek flows down to the Black Sea passing Kızıltaş, Sarıyakup, Pınarlar and Güdül villages. Its mouth is next to the eastern part of Giresun city. The Aksu Deresi is 60 kilometres (37 mi) long.

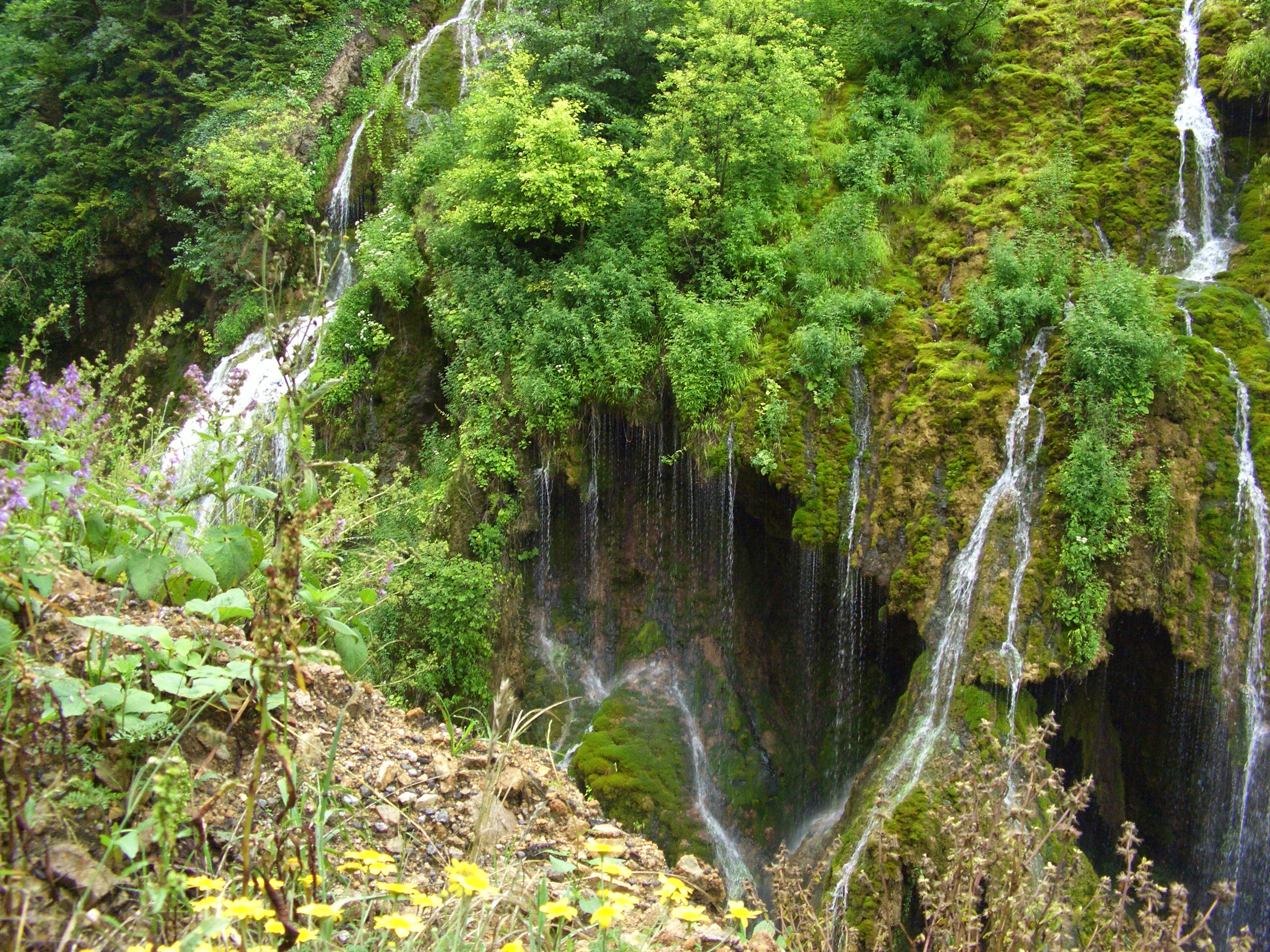
Waterfalls of a tributary of Aksu nearby Pınarlar
