= Dereli District =

District of Giresun Province, Turkey

- District
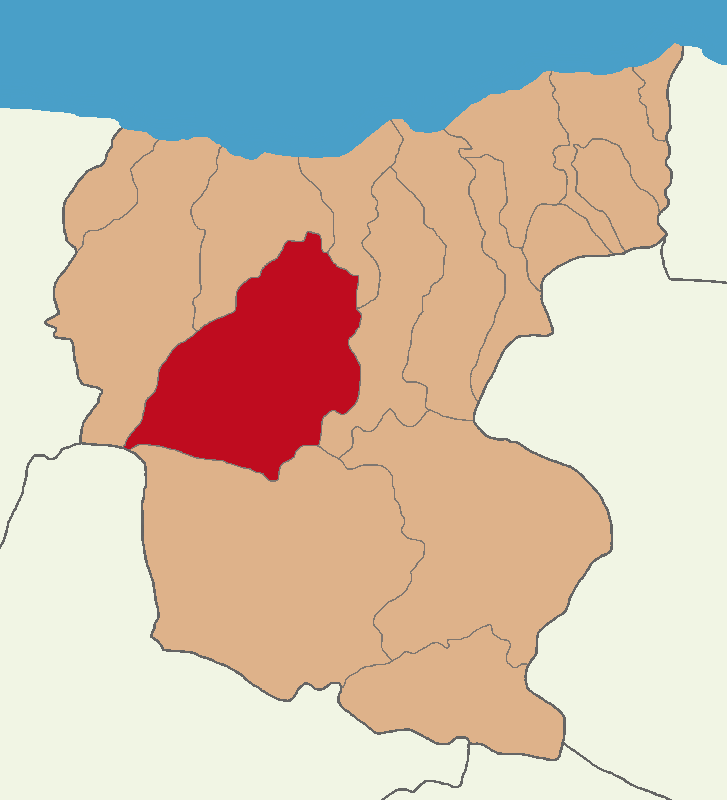
- Map showing Dereli District in Giresun Province

- Location in Turkey
- Coordinates: 40°44′N 38°26′E
- Country: Turkey
- Province: Giresun
- Seat: Dereli

Government
  - Kaymakam: Okan Yenidünya
- Area: 849 km^{2} (328 sq mi)
- Population (2022): 18,696
  - Density: 22/km^{2} (57/sq mi)
- Time zone: UTC+3 (TRT)
- Website: www.dereli.gov.tr

Dereli District is a district of the Giresun Province of Turkey. Its seat is the town of Dereli. Its area is 849 km^{2}, and its population is 18,696 (2022).

== Composition ==
Dereli District

There are two municipalities in Dereli District:

- Dereli
- Yavuzkemal

There are 34 villages in Dereli District:

- Akkaya
- Aksu
- Alancık
- Çalca
- Çalköy
- Çamlı
- Çengelköy
- Eğriambar
- Güdül
- Güzelköy
- Heydere
- Hisarköy
- İçmesu
- Kızıltaş
- Konuklu
- Küçükahmet
- Küknarlı
- Kümbet
- Kurtulmuş
- Maden
- Meşeliyatak
- Pınarlar
- Sarıyakup
- Tamdere
- Taşlıca
- Tepeköy
- Tepeküknarlı
- Uzundere
- Yaylacık
- Yeşilkaya
- Yeşiltepe
- Yeşilvadi
- Yıldız
- Yüce
