= Giresun =

- Municipality
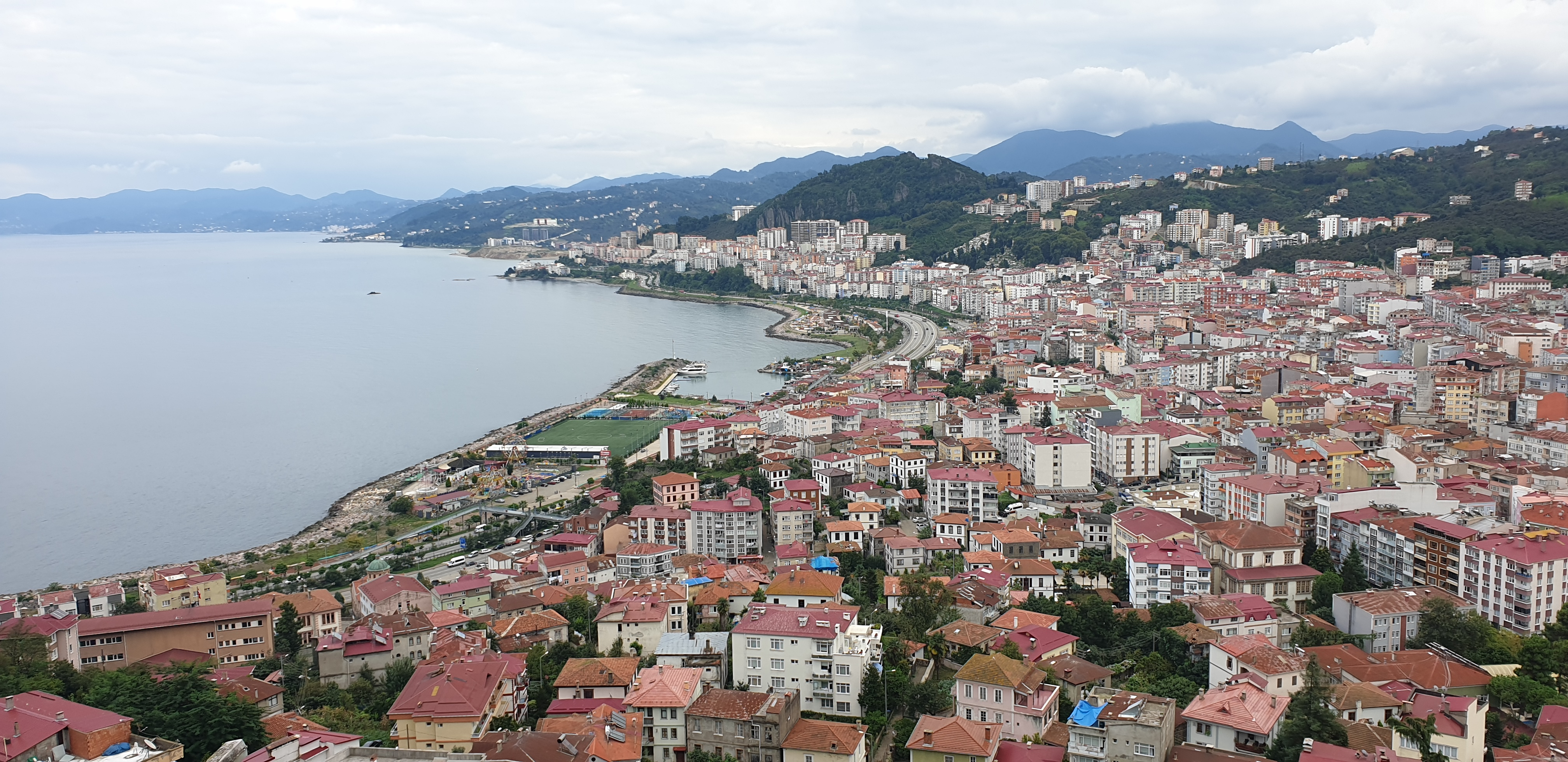
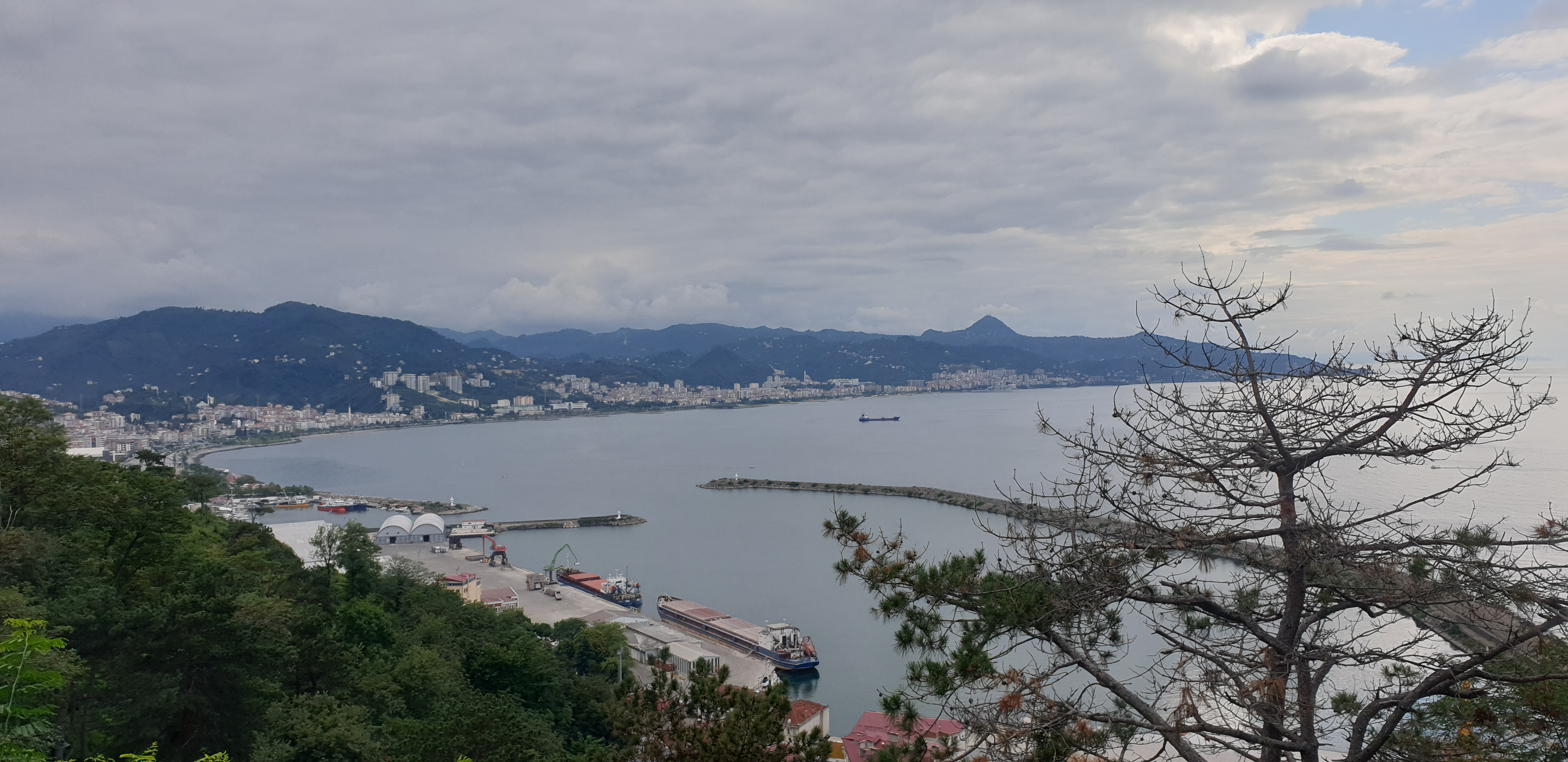
- View from the Giresun Castle, looking east (top image) and looking west (bottom image)

- Logo

- Location within Turkey
- Coordinates: 40°54′55″N 38°23′22″E
- Country: Turkey
- Province: Giresun
- District: Giresun

Government
  - Mayor: Fuat Köse (CHP)
- Elevation: 50 m (160 ft)
- Population (2022): 125,682
- Time zone: UTC+3 (TRT)
- Postal code: 28610
- Area code: 0454
- Climate: Cfa
- Website: www.giresun.bel.tr

Giresun (pronounced [giˈɾesun]) is a city in the Black Sea Region of northeastern Turkey, about 175 km (109 mi) west of the city of Trabzon. It is the seat of Giresun Province and Giresun District. It has a population of 125,682 (2022).

== Etymology ==
Giresun was known to the ancient Greeks as Choerades or more prominently as Cerasus or Kerasous (Ancient Greek: Κερασοῦς, romanized: Kerasoûs), the origin of the modern name.

The name Kerasous consists of the Greek words κερασός (kerasós) "cherry" + -ουντ (a place marker). Thus, the Greek root of the word "cherry", κερασός (kerasós), predates the name of the city, and the ultimate origin of the word cherry (and thus the name of the city) is probably from a Pre-Greek substrate, likely of Anatolian origin, given the intervocalic σ in Κερασοῦς and the apparent cognates of it found in other languages of the region. According to Pliny, the cherry was first exported from Kerasous to Europe in Roman times by Lucullus.

Another theory suggests that Kerasous comes from κέρας (keras) "horn" + -ουντ (a place marker), due to the prominent horn-shaped peninsula that the city is situated on (compare with the Greek name for the horn-shaped Golden Horn waterway in Istanbul, Κέρας (Keras) "Horn"). The toponym would have later mutated into Kerasunt (sometimes written Kérasounde or Kerassunde), and the word "cherry" (as well as its cognates found in other local languages) was derived from the name of the city itself, rather than the other way around.

Pharnaces I of Pontus renamed the city Pharnacia after himself, after he captured the city in 183 BC, and it was called by that name as late as the 2nd century AD. According to A. H. M. Jones, the city officially reverted to its original name of Kerasous in 64 AD.

The Greek name Kerasous was Turkified into Giresun (Ottoman Turkish: گیره‌سون) after Turks gained permanent control of the region in the late 14th century.

== History ==
Historical affiliations

Hittites c. 1600–1200 BC
Phrygia c. 800–695 BC
Achaemenid Empire c. 547–333 BC
Macedonian Empire 333–323 BC
Kingdom of Pontus c. 281–63 BC
Roman Empire 63 BC–395 AD
Byzantine Empire 395–1204
Empire of Trebizond 1204–1461
Ottoman Empire 1461–1922
Turkey 1923–present

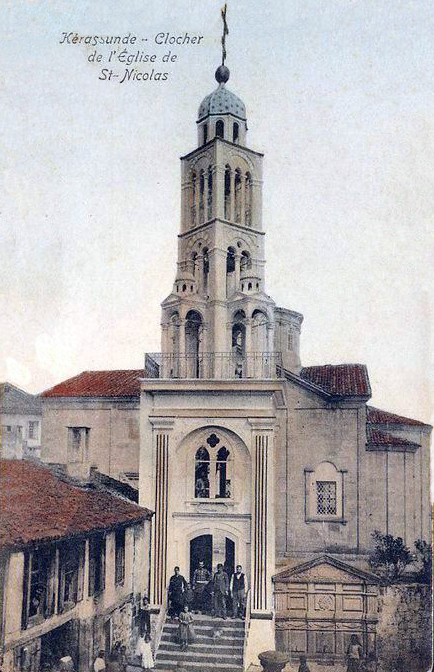
Belltower of Saint Nicholas church in Kerasous

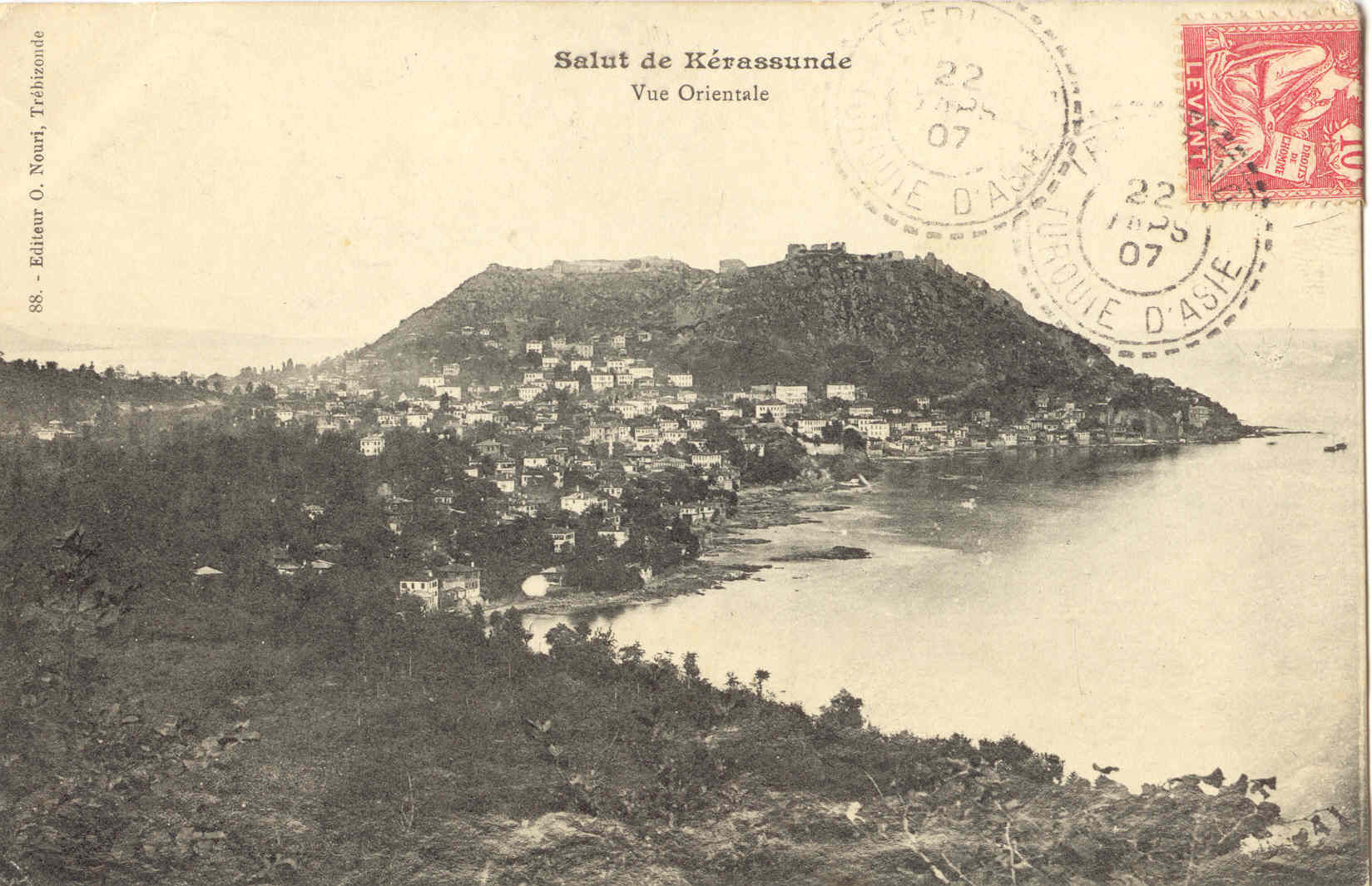
Giresun at the beginning of the 20th century

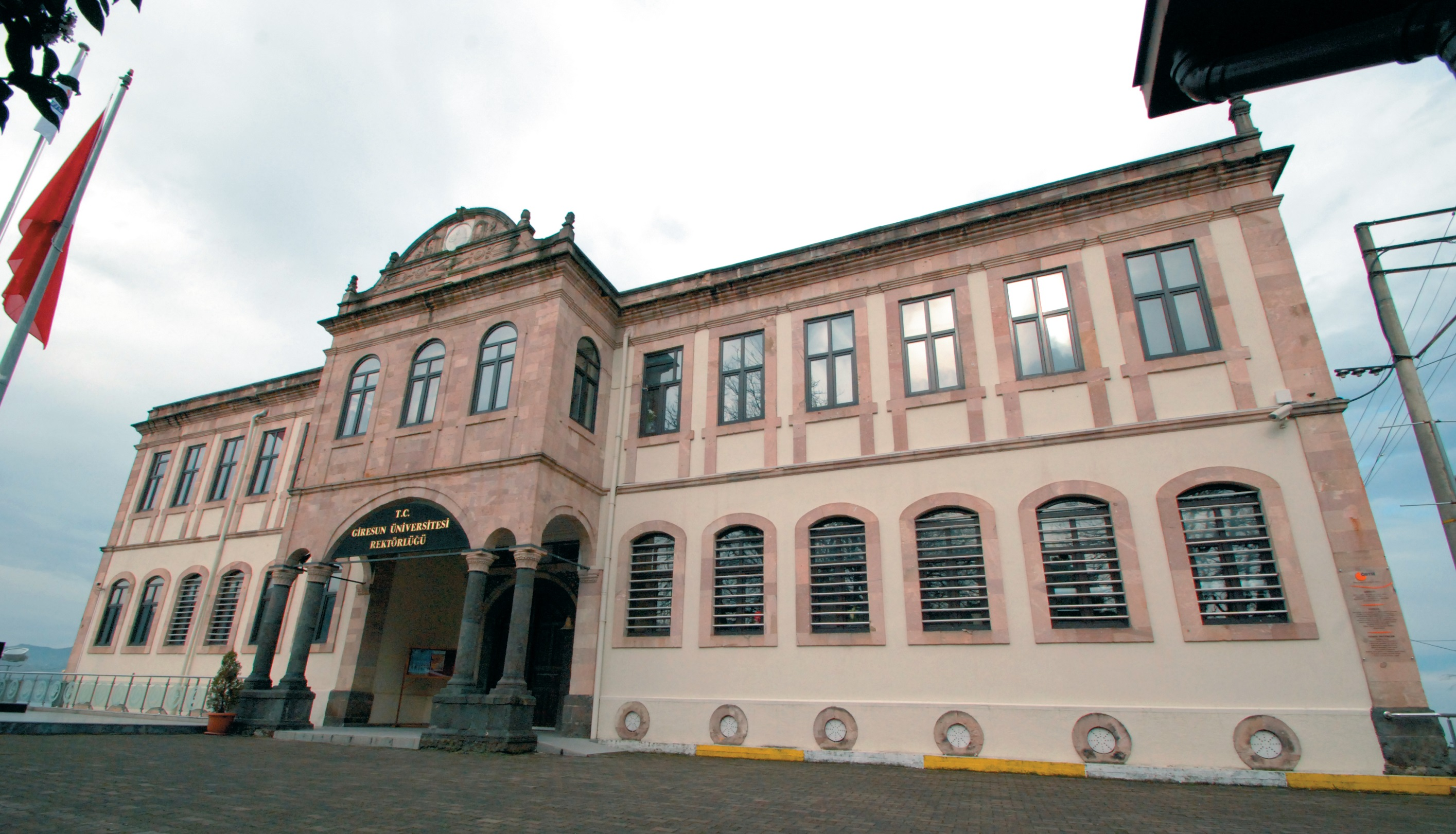
Old Municipality Building in Giresun

The city was founded c. 180 BC by Pharnaces I of Pontus, who sent Greek citizens from Kotyora to colonize the area. The name of the city was first cited in the book Anabasis by Xenophon as Kerasus. Historic records reveal that the city was dominated by the Miletians, Persians, Romans, Byzantines and the Empire of Trebizond. The older parts of the city lie on a peninsula crowned by a ruined Byzantine fortress, sheltering the small natural harbor.

Near the city is Giresun Island, which in ancient times was known as Aretias (Greek: Ἀρητιάς) or Island of Ares (Greek: Ἄρεος νῆσος). According to the poetic account of Apollonius of Rhodes, it was there that the Argonauts encountered the Amazons, who had dedicated a temple to the war god Ares there. Even today, a fertility festival is performed there every May, usually involving a famed boulder named the Hamza Stone, which may have been sacred to a Roman stone cult or a Cybele cult.

During the medieval period, Kerasous was part of the Byzantine Empire and later the second city of the Empire of Trebizond ruled by the Megas Komnenoi. Alexios II Megas Komnenos defeated the Turkoman "Koustoganes" at Kerasous in September 1302. To secure his victory, Alexios built a fortress which overlooks the sea. From 1244 onwards, the Seljuk Turks moved into the area, pursued at times by the Mongols. By the 15th century, most of the coast was brought within the Ottoman Empire during the reign of Mehmed II. It was briefly occupied by Emirate of Chalybia from 1398 to 1400. Local traditions claim that Kerasous held out for many months after the Fall of Trebizon in 1461, then surrendered on the terms that the Christian inhabitants could remain and retain their arms, but were required to maintain a boat for the use of the Turks on a nearby river. The Greeks of the island of Aretias held out against the Ottomans for 7 years after the Fall of Trebizond.

The city became known by its Turkish name of Giresun after 1923.

Ottoman era paintings and drawings of Kérassunde

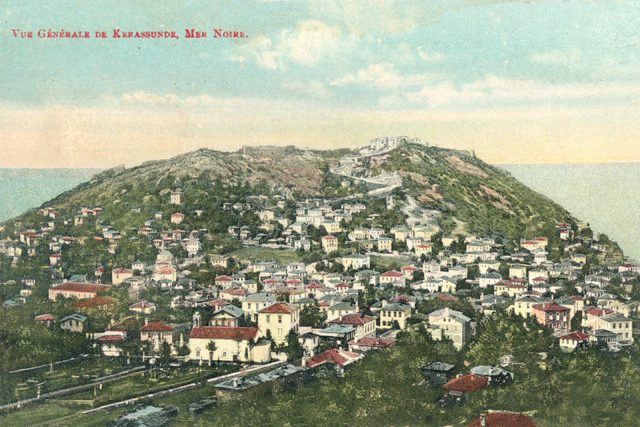
General view of Kerassunde on the Black Sea.

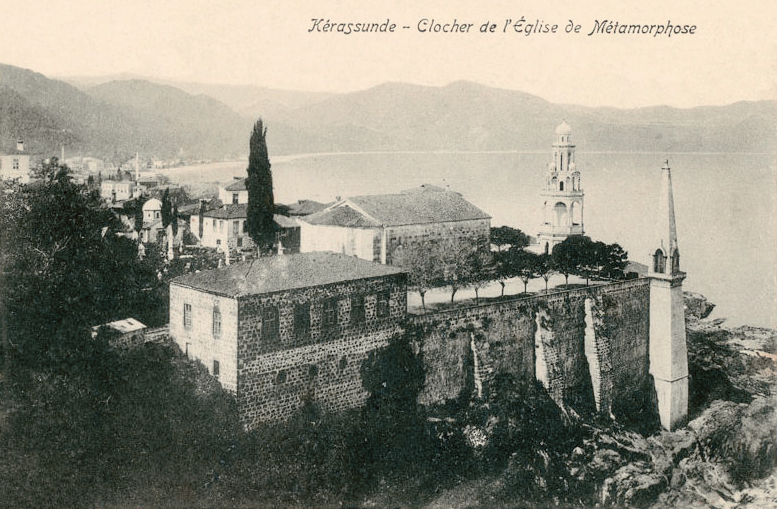
Bell tower of the church of metamorphosis.

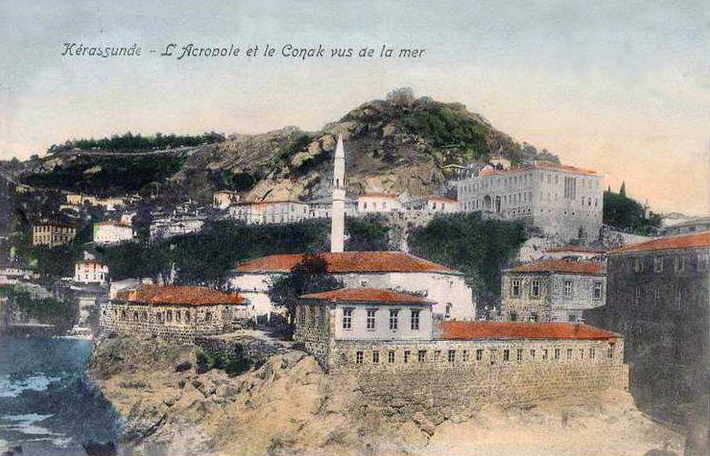
The acropolis and the government palace from the sea.

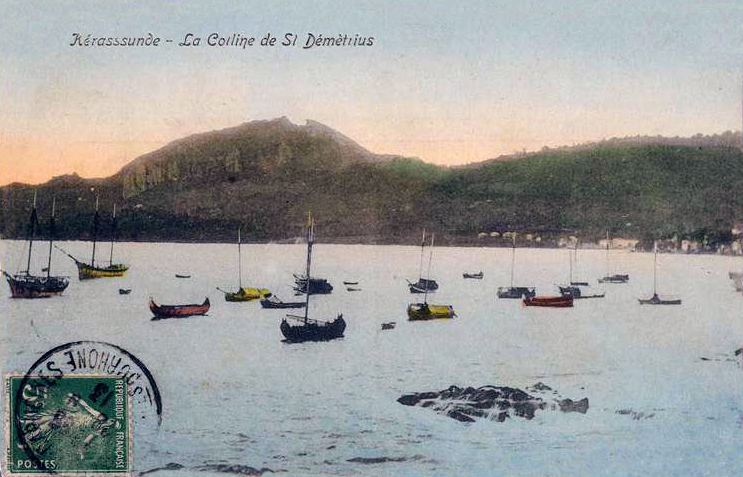
Hills of St. Demetrius.

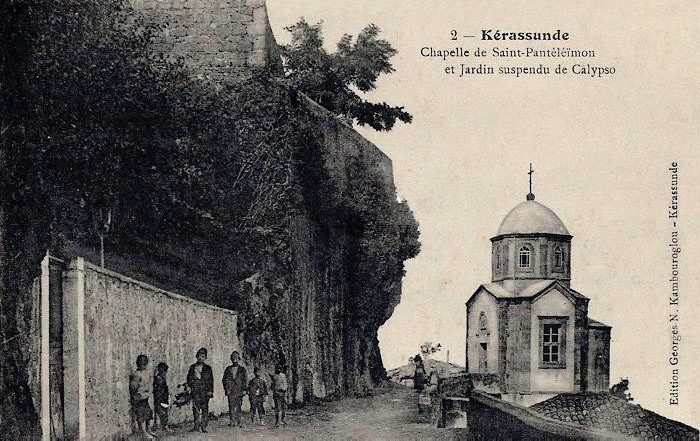
Chapel of St. Panteleimon and hanging garden of Calypso.

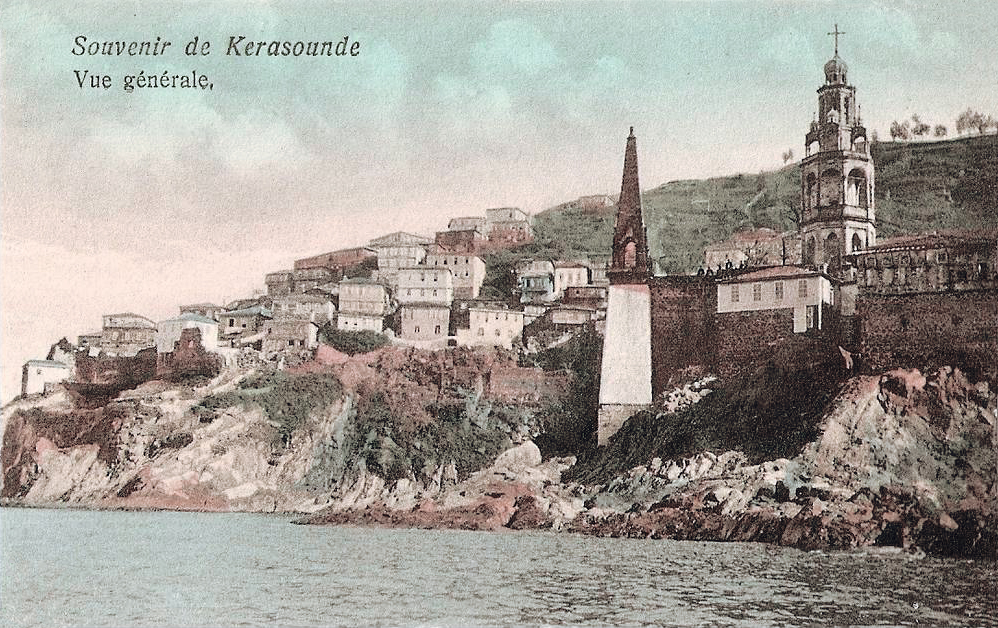
Postcard of Kerassunde (Giresun), Vilayet of Trebizond (Trabzon), Ottoman Empire.

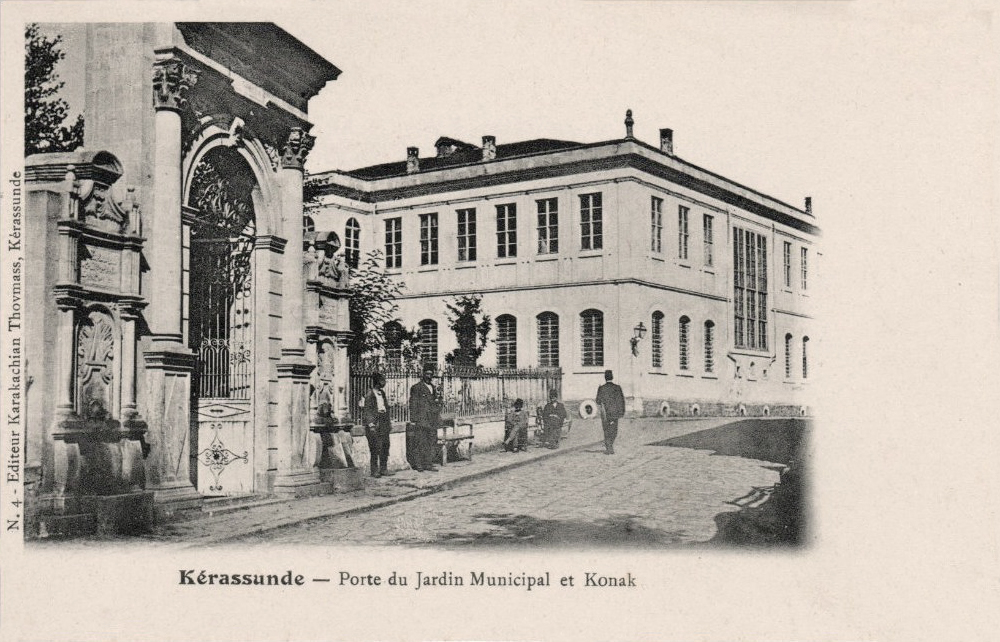
Gate to municipal garden and residency copy.

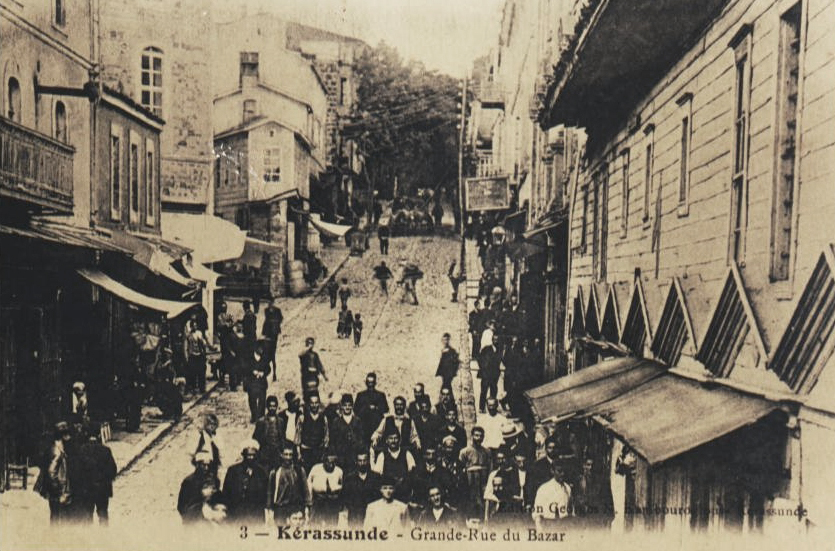
High Street of the bazaar.

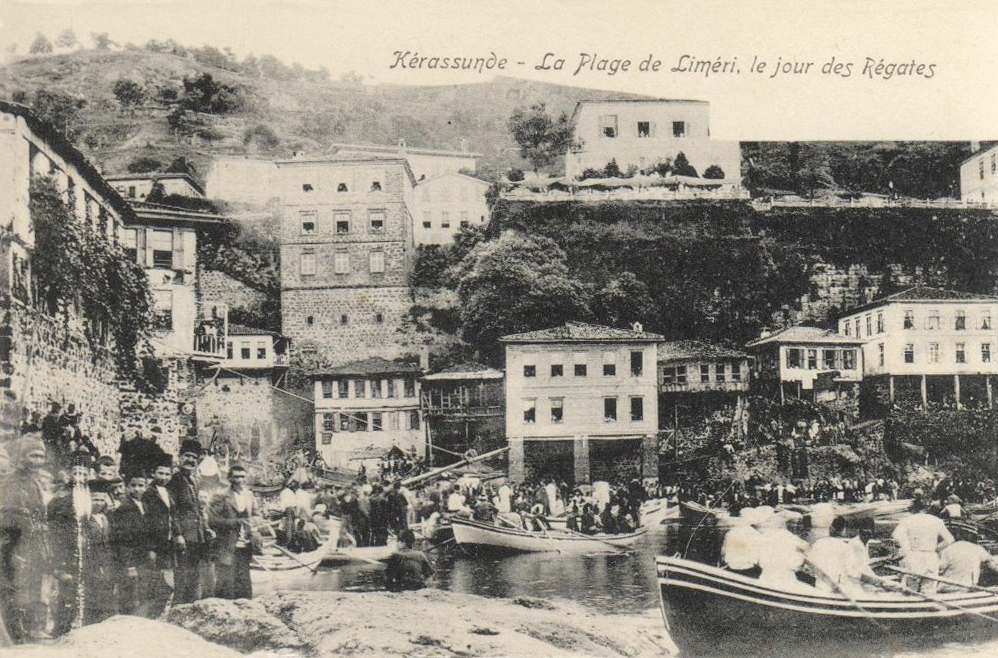
Day of regattas at Limeri beach.jpg

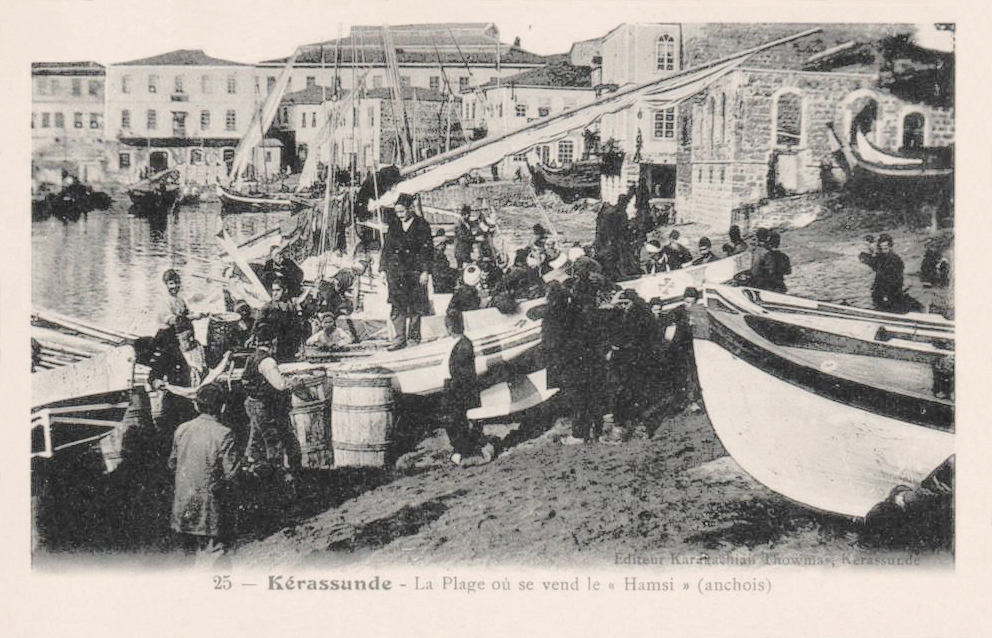
The beach where they sell anchovies.

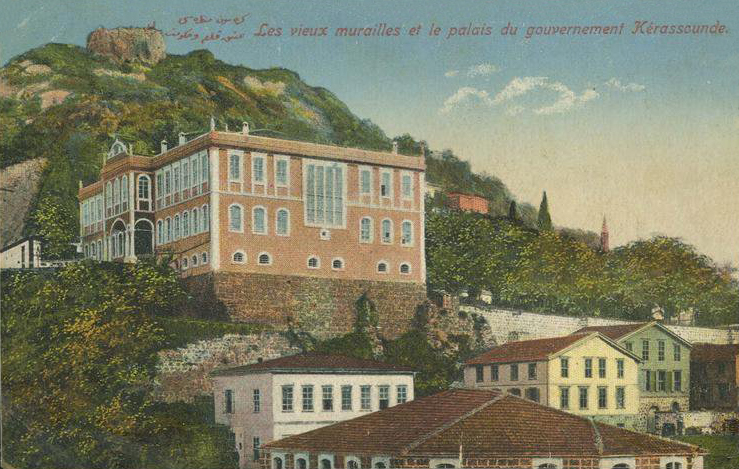
The old city walls and the government palace of Kerassunde.

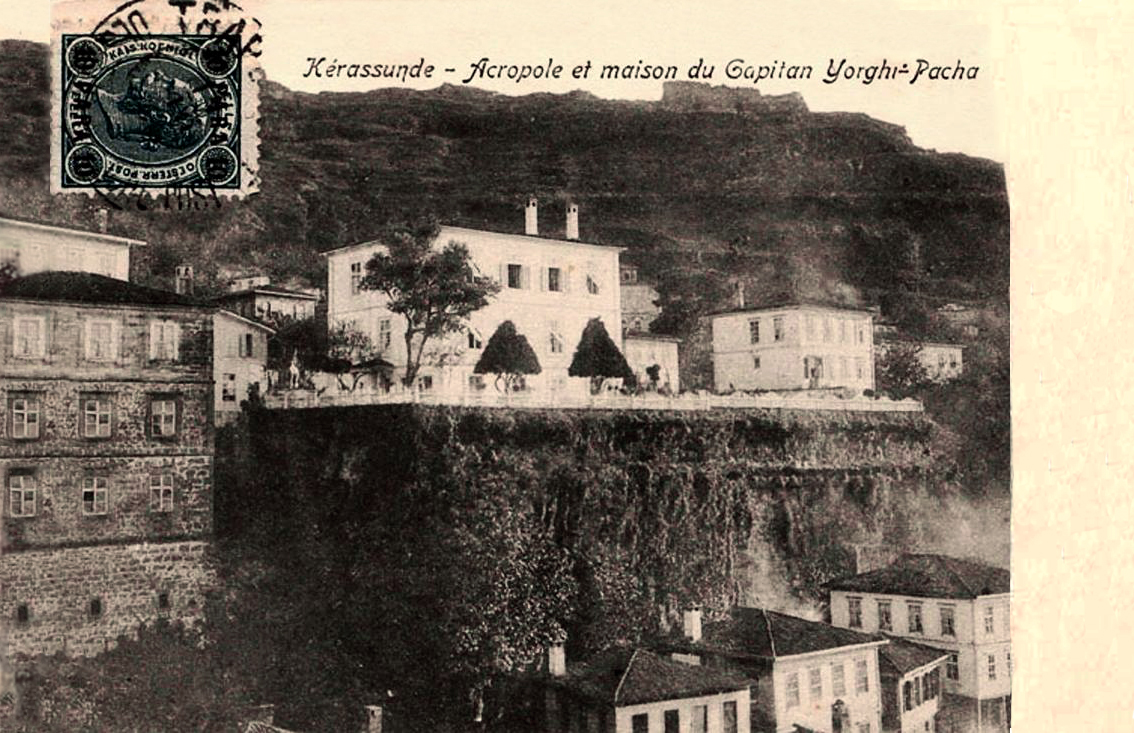
Acropolis and house of Captain Yorghi Pasha.

== Ecclesiastical history ==
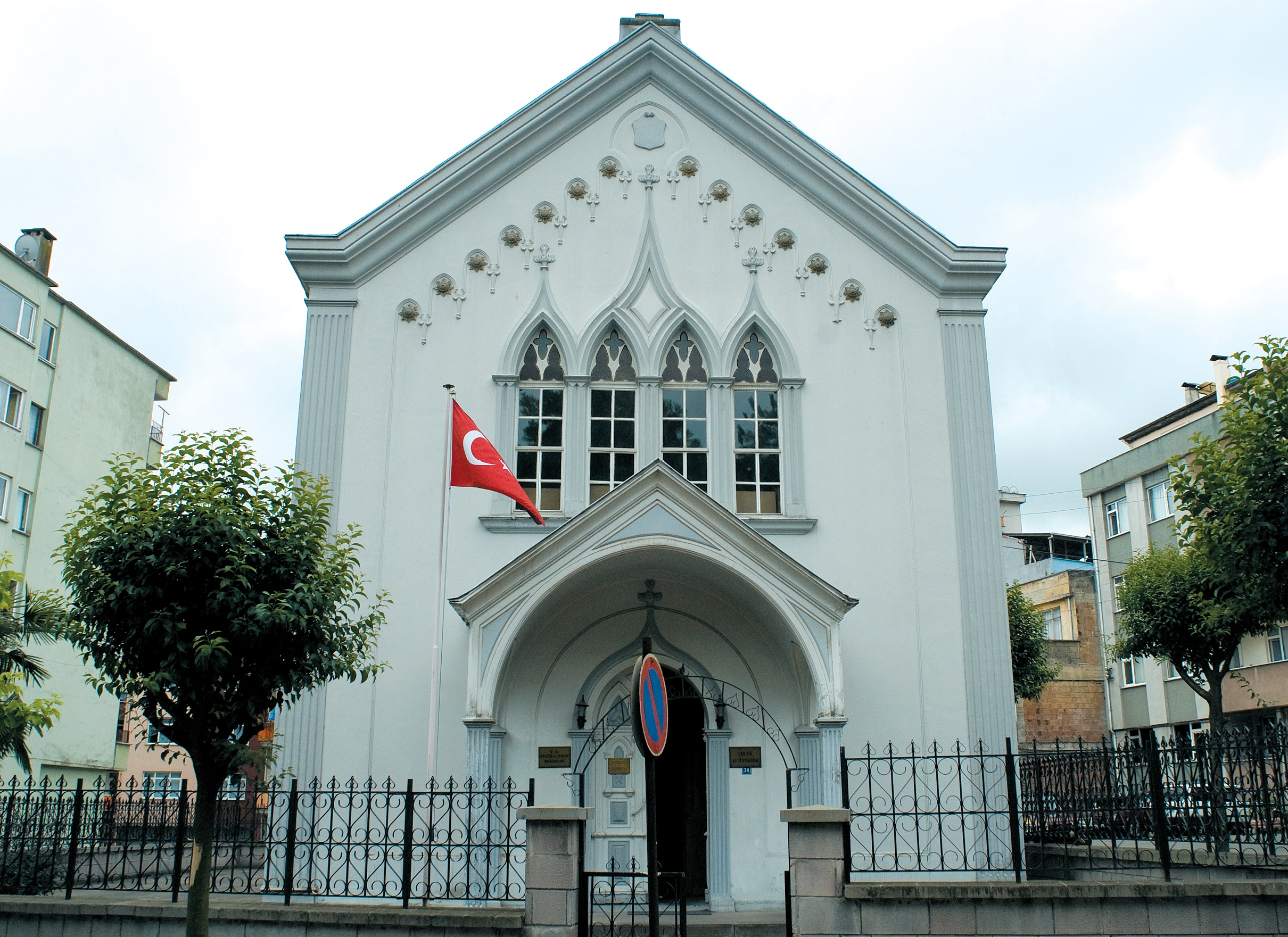
Former Greek Catholic Church in modern day Giresun, converted into a children's library

Kerasous in late antiquity became a Christian bishopric, and the names of several of its bishops are preserved in the acts of church councils: Gregorius at the Council of Ephesus in 431, Gratianus at the Council of Chalcedon in 451, Theophylactus at the Third Council of Constantinople in 680, Narses at the Trullan Council in 692, Ioannes at the Second Council of Nicaea in 787, and Simeon at the Photian Council of Constantinople in 879. An episcopal seal also records a certain Leo in the 9th century. The metropolitan bishop of Ancyra, Michael, was transferred to Kerasous in 1173 because of the harsh conditions he faced under the Seljuk Turks. The city remained a metropolitanate until 1703, at which time it was abandoned, and the church was instead placed under the metropolis of Trebizond.

The city is today listed by the Catholic Church as a titular see. The Ecumenical Patriarchate of Constantinople also considers Kerasous, together with Chaldia and Cheriana, as a titular metropolitanate in Turkey.

== Demographics ==
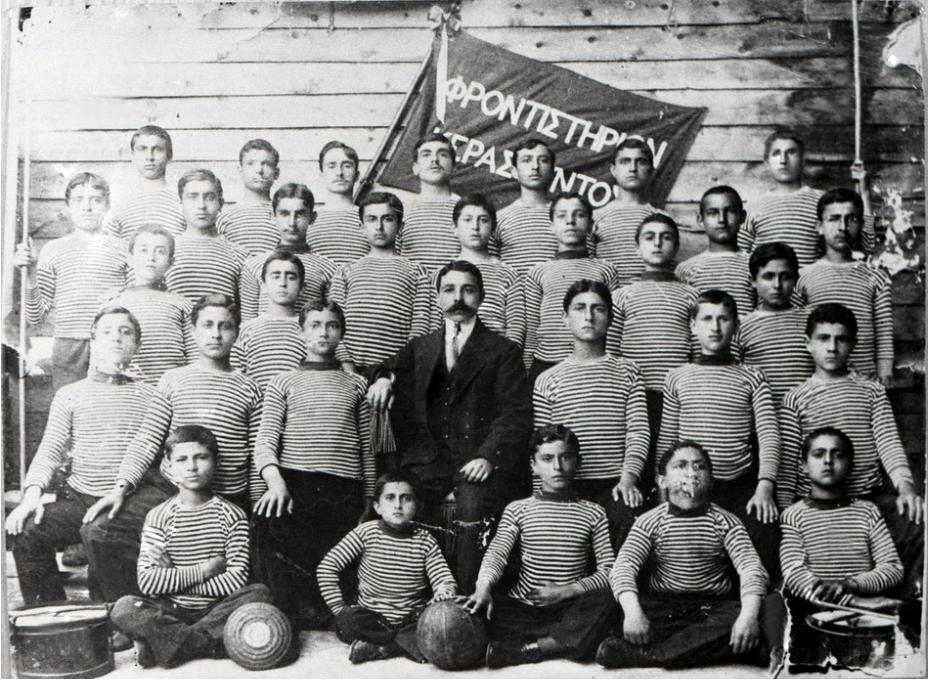
Pontic Greek athletics team from Kerasous, early 20th century

In the beginning of the 20th century, the city had 14,000 residents and 2,500 families. Of these, 1,200 families were Greek, 1,000 were Turkish, and 300 were Armenian. After the Pontic Greek genocide, surviving Greeks were expelled to Greece during the 1923 population exchange. There, they established villages such as Nea Kerasounta in Preveza, Greece.

== Economy ==
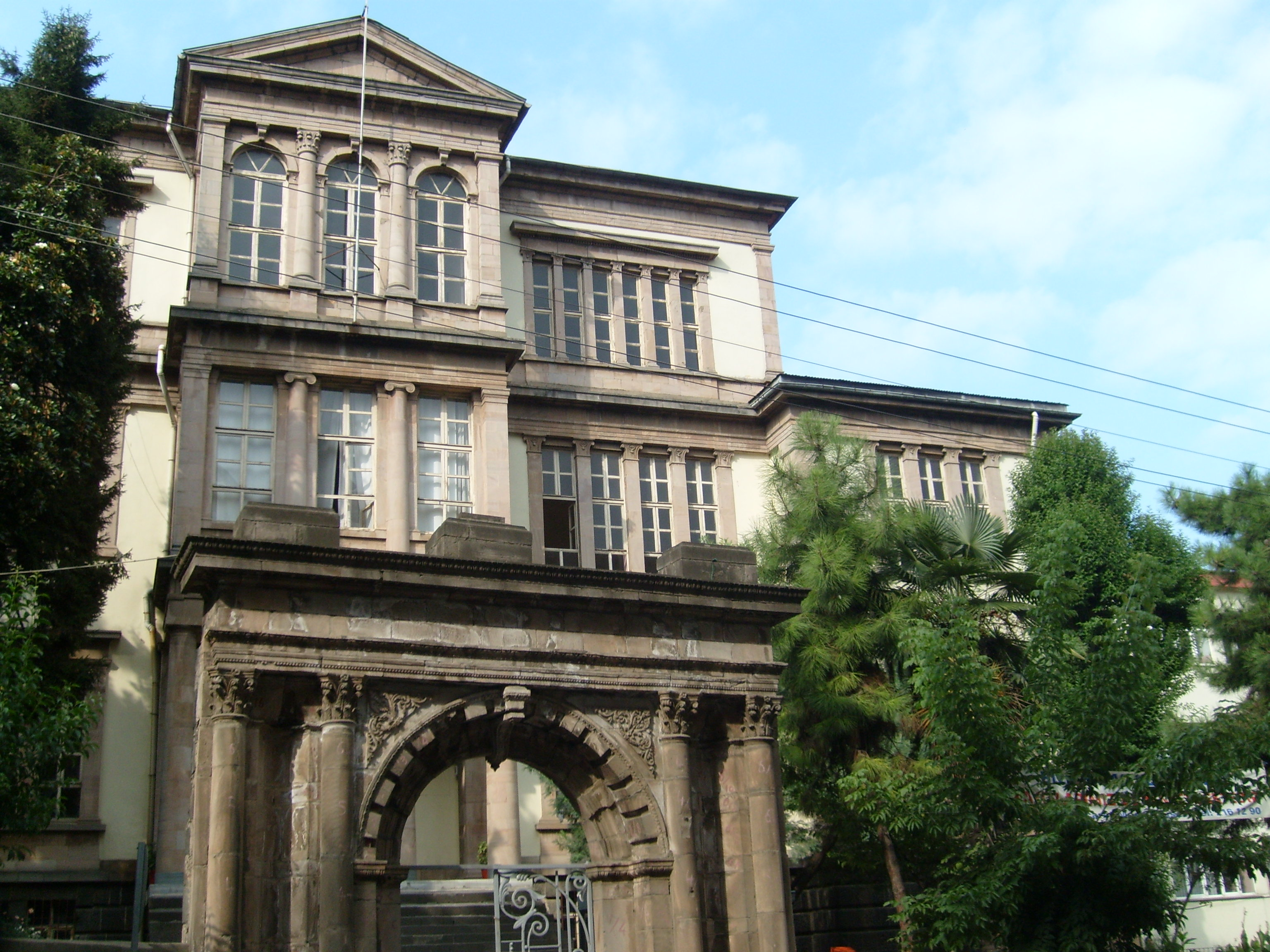
Giresun Commerce High School

Historically, Giresun was known for producing hazelnut. As of 1920, hazelnuts covered 460 square miles of the area. Manganese mines were also in the area, producing 470 tons as of 1901.

== Sports ==
The city owns a football team Giresunspor and a football stadium Çotanak Sport Complex.

Alperen Şengün (25 July 2002) a professional basketball player for the Houston Rockets of the National Basketball Association (NBA) was born in Giresun.

== Places of interest ==
- The well preserved Giresun Castle in the city center
- Giresun Island
- Museum, Children's Library, Hacı Hüseyin Mosque, Kale Mosque, Seyyid-i Vakkas Tomb, Mausoleum of Topal Osman
- Giresun Archaeological Museum (the former Gorgora church)
- Old Ottoman houses of Zeytinlik district
- Kırkharman Kilisesi, a former Greek church
- Highlands (Kümbet, Bektaş, Kulakkaya, Çakrak, Tohumluk, Kurtbeli, Kazıkbeli, Ayıbeli, Beytarla, Buları, Kırkharman)
- Kuzalan Falls and Blue Lake
- Duroğlu
Giresun places of interest

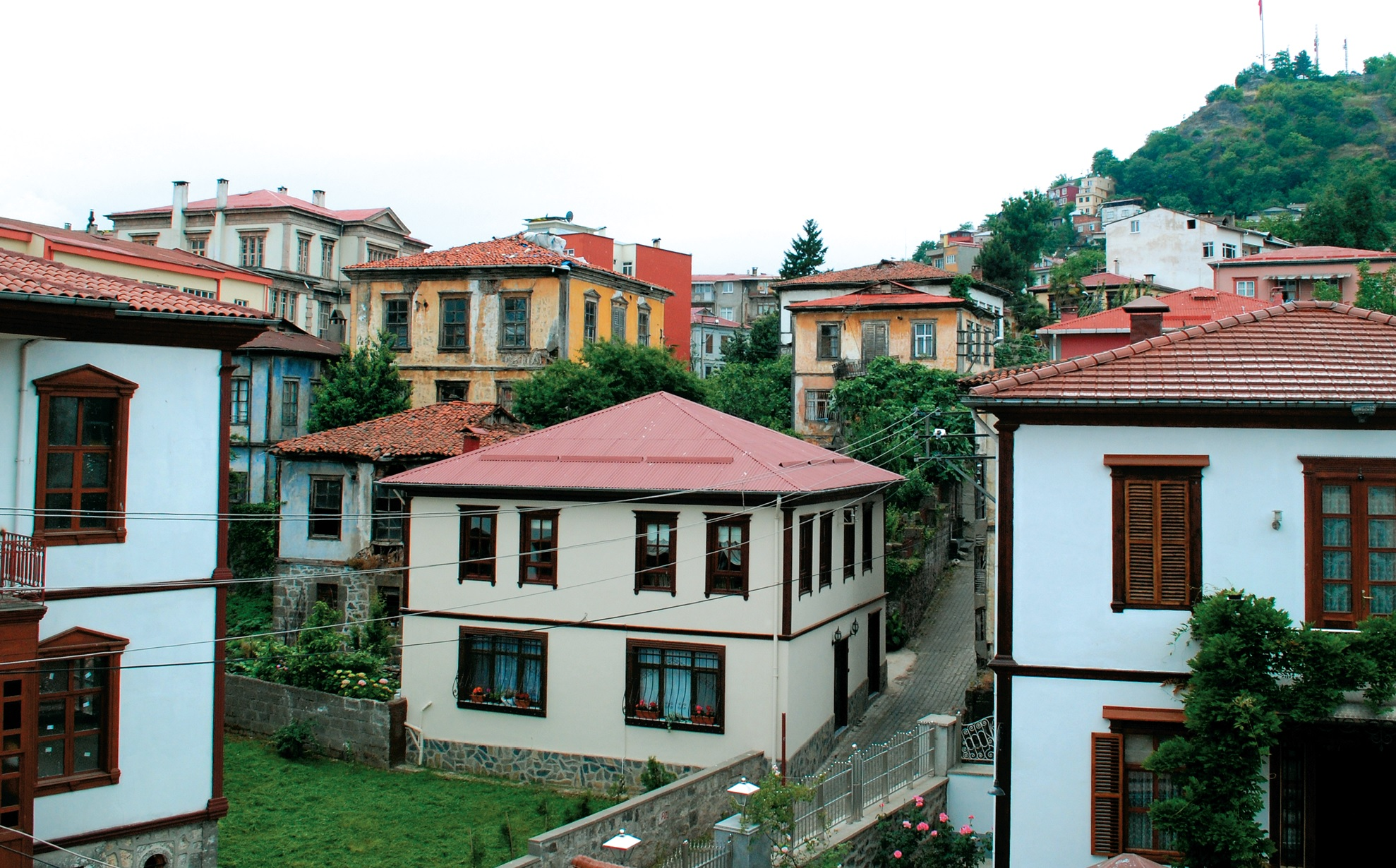
Old Ottoman houses in Zeytinlik neighbourhood

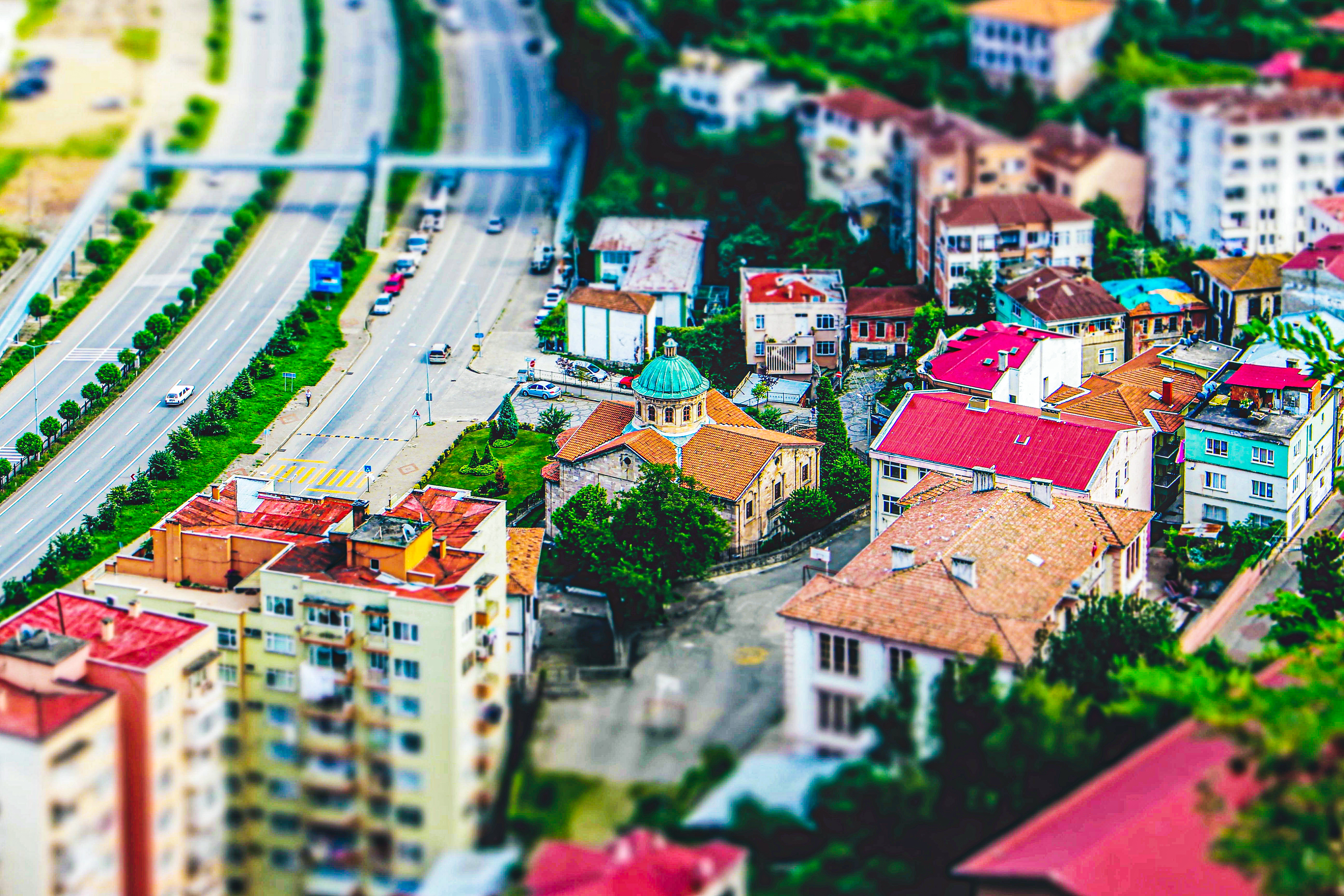
Giresun Archaeological Museum, formerly known as Gogora church

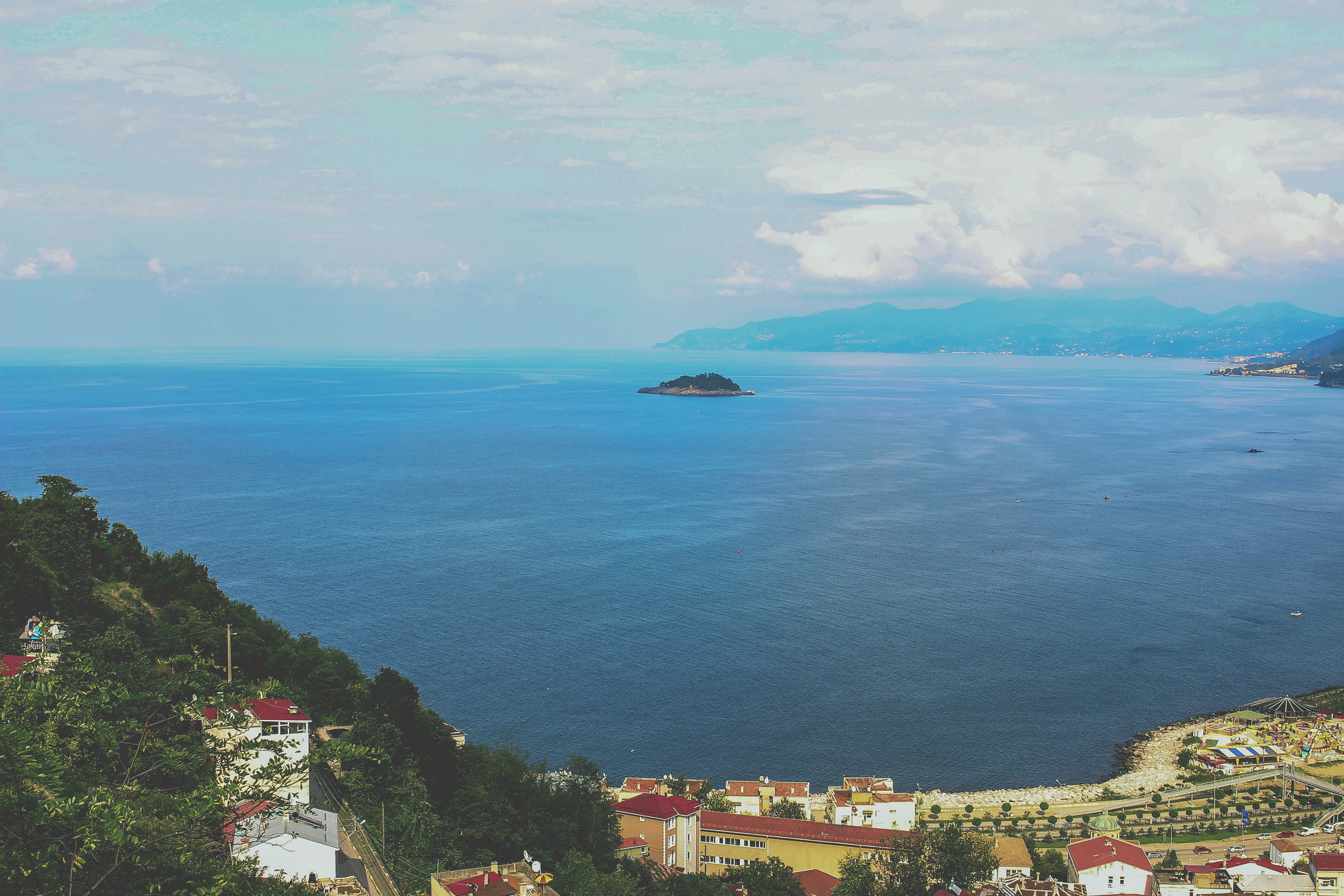
Giresun and its island

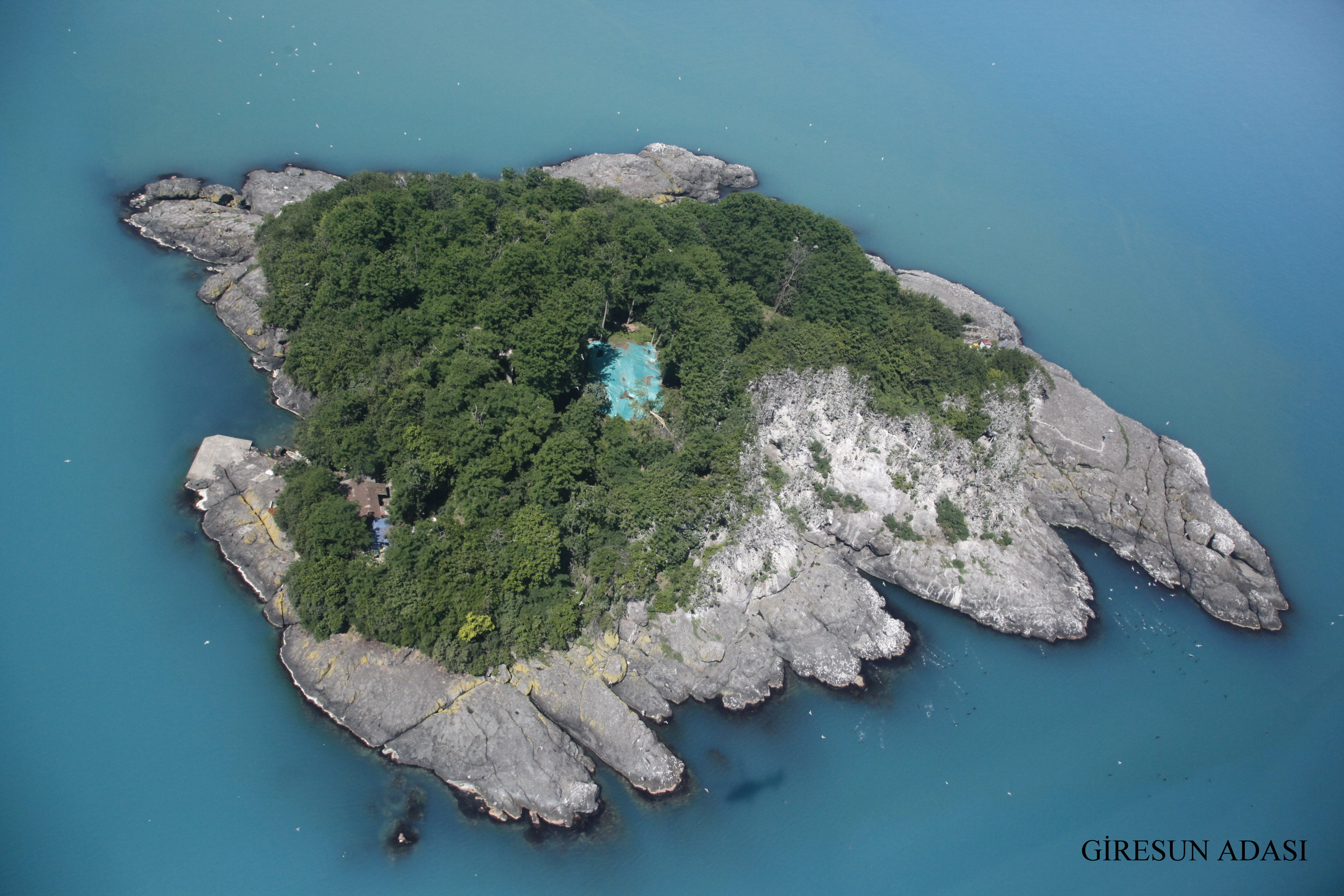
The island of Giresun

== Notable people ==
- George Valavanis (1876–1943), Pontic Greek journalist, folklorist and author
- Mustafa Subhi (1883–1921), Turkish communist revolutionary
- Topal Osman (1883–1923), Turkish militia leader, lieutenant colonel and genocide perpetrator
- Ashot Zorian (1905–1970), Armenian Egyptian painter and educator
- Panos Papadopulos (1920–2001), Pontic Greek actor
- İdris Küçükömer (1925–1987), Turkish academic and economist
- Fethi Naci (1927–2008), Turkish literary critic, writer, publisher, and political commentator
- Mehmet Işık (1938–2022), Turkish politician
- Dursun Aydın Özbek (b. 1949), Turkish businessman and president of Galatasaray S.K.
- Ahmet Yalçınkaya (b. 1963), Turkish poet and academic
- Hasan Turan (b. 1967), Turkish politician
- Erdem Gül (b. 1967), Turkish politician
- Elvan Işık Gezmiş (b. 1974), Turkish pharmacist and politician
- Murat Ongun (b. 1975) Turkish journalist
- Alperen Şengün (b. 2002), Turkish basketball player

== Geography ==
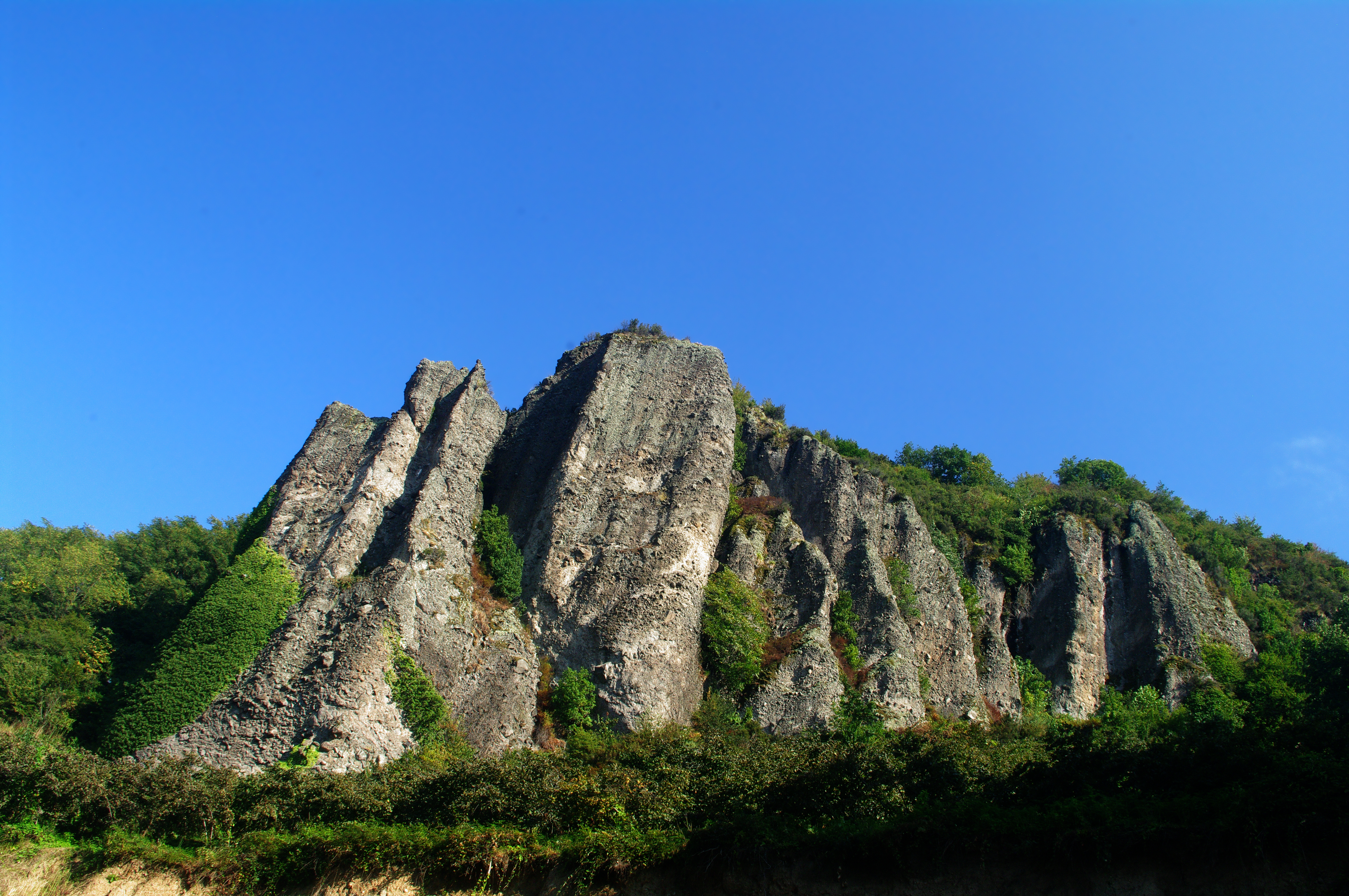
Northern end of Gedikkaya crag, located in the eastern part of Giresun city

The surrounding region has rich agriculture, growing most of Turkey's hazelnuts as well as walnuts, cherries, leather and timber, and the port of Giresun has long handled these products. The harbor was enlarged in the 1960s, and the town is still a port and commercial center for the surrounding districts.

Like everywhere else on the Black Sea coast, it rains (and often snows in winter) and is very humid throughout the year, with a lack of extreme temperatures both in summer and winter. As a result, Giresun and the surrounding countryside are covered with luxuriant flora. Just beyond the city are hazelnut groves, and there are high pastures (yayla) further in the mountains.

== Climate ==
Giresun has a humid subtropical climate (Cfa or Cf) under both the Köppen and Trewartha climate classifications, with warm, humid summers and cool, damp winters. As a part of the very humid southern Black Sea coast, it experiences frequent precipitation throughout the year (mainly due to the lake-effect rain phenomena), with a small peak in rainfall days in spring and fall. Giresun is the cloudiest city in Turkey, as well as one of the cloudiest cities of the temperate latitudes; with annual sunshine of around 1,000 hours, it is more akin to far northwestern Europe.

Snowfall is somewhat common between the months of December and March, snowing for a week or two, and it can be heavy once it snows.

The water temperature is cool in winter and warm in summer and fluctuates between 8 °C (46 °F) and 24 °C (75 °F) throughout the year.

Climate data for Giresun (1991–2020, extremes 1929–2023)
Month	Jan	Feb	Mar	Apr	May	Jun	Jul	Aug	Sep	Oct	Nov	Dec	Year
Record high °C (°F)	29.1 (84.4)	29.5 (85.1)	34.9 (94.8)	36.0 (96.8)	35.4 (95.7)	36.2 (97.2)	35.3 (95.5)	35.2 (95.4)	32.9 (91.2)	37.3 (99.1)	32.8 (91.0)	28.0 (82.4)	37.3 (99.1)
Mean daily maximum °C (°F)	10.6 (51.1)	10.7 (51.3)	12.4 (54.3)	15.3 (59.5)	19.2 (66.6)	23.9 (75.0)	26.8 (80.2)	27.4 (81.3)	24.2 (75.6)	20.3 (68.5)	16.0 (60.8)	12.7 (54.9)	18.3 (64.9)
Daily mean °C (°F)	7.6 (45.7)	7.4 (45.3)	8.8 (47.8)	11.6 (52.9)	16.0 (60.8)	20.8 (69.4)	23.7 (74.7)	24.3 (75.7)	21.0 (69.8)	17.2 (63.0)	12.8 (55.0)	9.7 (49.5)	15.1 (59.2)
Mean daily minimum °C (°F)	5.3 (41.5)	4.8 (40.6)	6.1 (43.0)	8.9 (48.0)	13.6 (56.5)	18.1 (64.6)	21.0 (69.8)	21.7 (71.1)	18.4 (65.1)	14.7 (58.5)	10.3 (50.5)	7.3 (45.1)	12.5 (54.5)
Record low °C (°F)	−6.2 (20.8)	−9.8 (14.4)	−5.8 (21.6)	−1.4 (29.5)	4.0 (39.2)	6.8 (44.2)	12.1 (53.8)	12.1 (53.8)	4.8 (40.6)	4.2 (39.6)	−1.6 (29.1)	−2.4 (27.7)	−9.8 (14.4)
Average precipitation mm (inches)	127.6 (5.02)	92.0 (3.62)	98.0 (3.86)	72.8 (2.87)	73.1 (2.88)	83.9 (3.30)	82.2 (3.24)	81.8 (3.22)	133.7 (5.26)	175.8 (6.92)	158.5 (6.24)	129.0 (5.08)	1,308.4 (51.51)
Average precipitation days	14.9	14.3	16.5	14.9	14.57	12.57	10.93	11.1	12.77	15.43	13	14.73	165.7
Average snowy days	3.0	2.5	1.5	0.1	0	0	0	0	0	0	0	1.3	8.4
Average relative humidity (%)	66.7	67.3	69.8	73.8	76.1	73.8	73	72.5	72.7	73.1	67	65.1	70.9
Mean monthly sunshine hours	52.7	70.6	65.1	87.0	108.5	141.0	124.0	108.5	87.0	62.0	75.0	49.6	1,031
Mean daily sunshine hours	1.7	2.5	2.1	2.9	3.5	4.7	4.0	3.5	2.9	2.0	2.5	1.6	2.8
Source 1: Turkish State Meteorological Service (sun 1929–2020)
Source 2: NOAA NCEI (Humidity), Meteomanz (snowy days 2000-2024)

== Twin towns ==
Giresun is twinned with:

- Alba, Italy
- Bátonyterenye, Hungary
- La Louvière, Belgium
- Ölgii, Mongolia
- Sagae, Japan
- Shaki, Azerbaijan
- Urmia, Iran
