= Virgin Mary Monastery =

Former Greek monastery in northern Turkey

- Meryem Ana Manastırı
- Location within Turkey

Monastery information
- Order: Greek Orthodox
- Established: 2nd century
- Disestablished: 1940s

Architecture
- Status: Ruins
- Functional status: Tourist destination

Site
- Location: Şebinkarahisar District, Giresun, Turkey
- Coordinates: 40.2765463°N 38.5054385°E
- Visible remains: Four stories; 32 rooms
- Public access: Yes

The Virgin Mary Monastery (Turkish: Meryem Ana Manastırı) is a former monastery dating back to the 2nd century in the Giresun Province of Turkey. It was in use until 1940s. Built into a cave in the Pontic Mountains, the monastery sits high above ground, up a steep flight of stairs. The four-story building contains a dining room, church, rooms for the monks, and a classroom.

== History ==
The Virgin Mary Monastery dates back to at least the Byzantine period. It resembles the famous Sumela Monastery, which Turkish sources estimate was completed in the late 4th century. Sumela is also a former Greek Orthodox monastery built into a cliff.

Hulusi Güleç, the director of culture and tourism in Giresun, says the monastery was first used during Roman occupation of Anatolia. According to him, early Christians secretly practiced within the monastery during the persecution of Christians in the Roman Empire.

Virgin Mary Monastery lies in the borders of Şebinkarahisar District, a subdivision of Giresun Province. In the 1880s, the area around Şebinkarahisar had a little over 8,000 Pontian Greeks. Every year between the 26th and 28 August, Greeks from nearby visited the monastery to celebrate and worship.

However, the Greek/Turkish population exchange severely decreased the Pontian Greek presence in the region. The 1939 Erzincan earthquake made the abandoned monastery inaccessible, after which it fell into great disrepair.

== Restoration and tourism ==
In the early 2010s, the four-story monastery underwent restoration work. This was an effort to make the monastery into a tourist attraction, especially while Sumela Monastery, another tourist draw, was closed for repairs.

Both Anadolu Agency, a state-run Turkish news source, and an independently run paper report that the monastery has recently attracted the Pontian Greek diaspora. Forty residents of Kavala, Greece, descendants of Pontians forced out of Şebinkarahisar during the population exchange, visited Virgin Mary Monastery in 2015.
