= Behramşah Mosque =

Mosque in Şebinkarahisar, Turkey

Religion
- Affiliation: Islam
- Province: Giresun Province
- Region: Black Sea Region
- Rite: Sunni Islam
- Status: Active

Location
- Location: Şebinkarahisar, Turkey
- Interactive map of Behramşah Mosque
- Coordinates: 40°18′42″N 38°28′13″E

Architecture
- Type: Mosque
- Completed: 1184; 842 years ago

Specifications
- Length: 12.34 m (40.5 ft)
- Width: 11.47 m (37.6 ft)
- Dome: 1 (3 on narthex)
- Minaret: 1
- Materials: Stone

Behramşah Mosque (Turkish: Behramşah Camii) is a 12th-century built mosque in Şebinkarahisar, Giresun Province, Turkey.

== Location and history ==
Behramşah Mosque is located in Avutmuş neighborhood of Şebinkarahisar district of Giresun Province, norther Turkey.

Fahreddin Behram Shah (r. 1162–1225), the ruler of Anatolian beylik Mengujekids, built a castle near Şebinkarahisar in 1184 after he conquered the region. He ordered his son Muzafferüddin Muhammed to build a mosque in the town before he returned to his capital Erzincan. No inscription about the building date of the mosque exists. Scientists from Giresun University date the building of the mosque to 1184.

Şebinkarahisar has been affected by large earthquakes in the past. The mosques in Şebinkarahisar have been demolished many times for various reasons and rebuilt. Behramşah Mosque was destroyed in the 16th century, and was rebuilt according to the plan tradition of its time consisting of a single-domed prayer hall and three-domed narthex. It is the oldest mosque in the region. It was damaged again during the 1939 earthquake, and was restored.

== Architecture ==
The building has a nearly square plan with dimensions 11.47 m × 12.34 m (37.6 ft × 40.5 ft). While the northern facade is made of ashlar, other facades are constructed in rubble masonry with thick building joints. The top of the harim is covered with a dome on an octagonal drum. The dome is covered today with tin sheet. On the north side of the harim, there is a three-eyed narthex, which is accessed through a stone staircase leading down, since the building is below the road level on the west. The sides of the narthex, which was arranged in the form of a portico, were kept closed. The narthex, which opens to the outside with three pointed arches connecting two monolithic stone columns, is covered with three small domes with pendant passages. The domes are covered with tin sheets.

The minaret, situated at east of the narthex, has a stone base with chamfered corners and brick body, and features a single balcony. Underside the balcony, a hedgehog-like appearance was given by arranging the bricks in different directions. There is a conical cone on the honeycomb section, which tapers and rises above the balcony. The minaret was repaired to its original state following its damage caused by an earthquake. The entrance door, located in the middle of the northern façade, has a square shape, and the entrance opening is emphasized as a niche with a pointed arch. There is a window on both sides of the door. These windows are rectangular in shape, with flat inlay stones, and have a pointed relief arch on them. Additionally, there are two more windows on the east and south facades of the building. All of the windows are rectangular in shape, with flat stone inlays and iron gratings. The western facade of the building is completely blind. There are four square-shaped windows with round arch openings in the dome drum, which is held higher than the building. The one-way mahfil located in the north of the harim is accessed by a staircase located in the east of the entrance. The mahfil, which has a pavilion section, is supported by two wooden poles in the middle. The ashlar mihrab niche has a half-round shape. The pulpit is wooden, and was built later.
