= Taşhanlar =

Historic building ruin in Turkey

- Interactive map of the Taşhanlar area

General information
- Type: Bedesten
- Architectural style: Ottoman architecture
- Location: Şebinkarahisar, Turkey
- Coordinates: 40.26397°N 38.48726°E.
- Completed: 17th century
- Destroyed: 1939

Technical details
- Floor count: 2

Taşhanlar is a partly ruined historic bedesten, a covered bazaar complex, located in Şebinkarahisar district of Giresun Province, northern Turkey.

Taşhanlar, plural of Turkish: Taşhan, which means literally "stone inn or covered bazaar", is a bedesten building complex. It is located on the northern foothill of the Şebinkarahisar Castle, on both sides of the road to Orta neighborhood of Şebinkarahisar in Giresun Province, northern Turkey.

It was built by Taban Ahmed Agha, the leader of Sipahi (English: professional cavalryman in the Ottoman Empire) of Şebinkarahisar in the 17th century. It was constructed from loocal black stone in typical Ottoman Taşhan architecture. There are arched spaces on two-storeys on both sides of the entrance, and a courtyard in the middle. On the north facade, there is a section of Five outward-facing arched shops. The buildings were in use as a bedesten, covered bazaar. Between 1915 and 1939, the building was used as a prison.

During the 1939 Erzincan earthquake, it was partly damaged. Only the south facade has survived the disaster. The buildings were abandoned, and some materials of the building such as the stone, iron and lead sheet were looted.

Later, new shops were built on one side of the covered bazaar. Local people called these covered bazaars as "Taşhanlar". The district municipality took precautions to protect the buildings from further damage.
