= Şebinkarahisar District =

- District
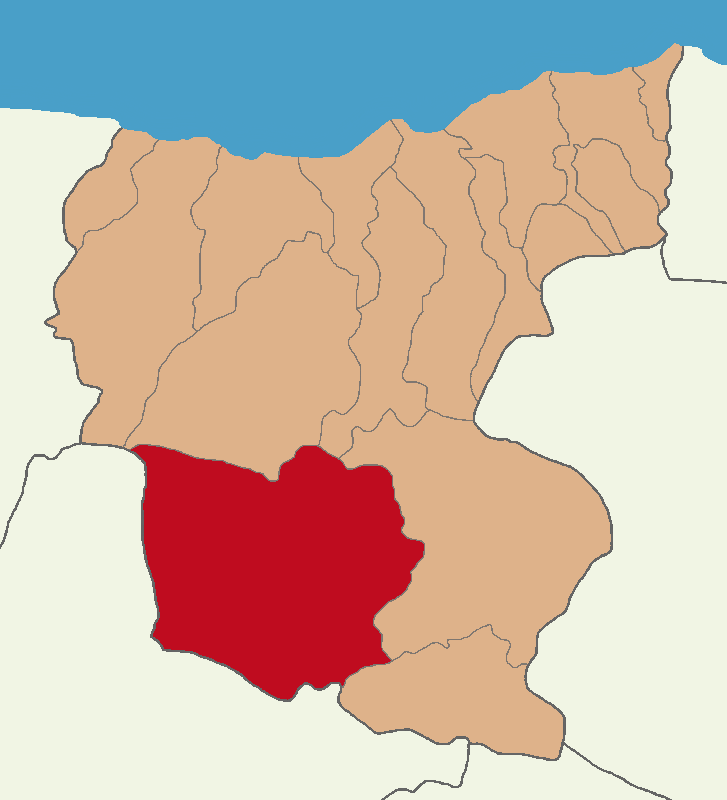
- Map showing Şebinkarahisar District in Giresun Province

- Location in Turkey
- Coordinates: 40°17′N 038°25′E
- Country: Turkey
- Province: Giresun
- Seat: Şebinkarahisar

Government
  - Kaymakam: Alay Yazıcı
- Area: 1,396 km^{2} (539 sq mi)
- Population (2022): 19,625
  - Density: 14/km^{2} (36/sq mi)
- Time zone: UTC+3 (TRT)
- Website: www.sebinkarahisar.gov.tr

Şebinkarahisar District is a district of Giresun Province in northeastern Turkey. Its administrative seat is the town of Şebinkarahisar. Its area is 1,396 km^{2}, and its population is 19,625 (2022). It is inland from the Black Sea in the Giresun Mountains (Paryadres Mountains).

== Composition ==
There is one municipality in Şebinkarahisar District:

- Şebinkarahisar

There are 62 villages in Şebinkarahisar District:

- Ahurck
- Akviran
- Alişar
- Altınçevre
- Arslanşah
- Asarcık
- Balcana
- Baltaşı
- Bayhasan
- Bayram
- Buzkeçi
- Çağlayan
- Çakır
- Çamlıbel
- Dereköy
- Diler
- Doğanyuva
- Dönençay
- Duman
- Ekecek
- Esentepe
- Evcili
- Gökçetaş
- Güneygören
- Gürpınar
- Güvercinlik
- Güzelyurt
- Hacıömer
- Hasanşeyh
- Hocaoğlu
- Karaağaç
- Karacaören
- Kayalı
- Kınık
- Konak
- Kule
- Ocaktaşı
- Ovacık
- Ozanlı
- Örencik
- Saraycık
- Sarıyer
- Sipahi
- Suboyu
- Sultankonağı
- Şahinler
- Şaplıca
- Taşcılı
- Tekkaya
- Tepeltepe
- Tokluağıl
- Toplukonak
- Turpçu
- Uğurca
- Yakınca
- Yaycı
- Yedikardeş
- Yeniyol
- Yeşilyayla
- Yeşilyurt
- Yıltarıç
- Yumrucaktaş

== History ==
Archaeological research shows that the area was first settled about 5500 BC, at the end of the Neolithic, by the Hittites and subsequently by Phrygians, Cimmerians, Lydians, Armenians and Persians.

The area was a part of the Persian Empire, that after Alexander, became part of Kingdom of Lesser Armenia. In II century BC this province became part of the Kingdom of Pontus. After the Romans took the area, it was part of the province of Bithynia et Pontus, and then after the reforms of Diocletian, it was part of the province of Lesser Armenia. Its capital was the town of Colonia (Κολώνεια, now Şebinkarahisar), above the headwaters of the Lykos River now Kelkit River). In the 7th century it was part of the Byzantine province of Armeniac Theme, and later of Chaldia, before finally becoming the seat of its own separate theme by 863. The area was attacked by Arab raiders in 778 and in 940, but remained in Byzantine hands until about 1071.

The area was conquered by the Seljuk Turks soon after the Battle of Manzikert in 1071. There was a short-lived Byzantine recovery about 1106, but the area soon returned to Turkish control. Through the following centuries, the fortress at Kolonia occupied a strategic position on the frontier between the Turkish-controlled interior and the Byzantine Empire of Trebizond in the Pontus. The Danishmends held the area until the 1170s, when it passed into the hands of the Saltukids of Erzurum. In 1202 the Mengujekids, vassals of the Seljuks of Rum, took over. Following the Mongol invasion of the mid-13th century, the area was part of the lands of the Eretnids, who minted coins in the town of Koloneia (Koğoniya). A succession of petty Turkmen warlords controlled the area until Uzun Hasan of the Ak Koyunlu took over in 1459, perhaps under the impression that it was part of the dowry of his new Greek wife, the daughter of John IV of Trebizond.

Mehmed II took the towns of Karahisar and Koyulhisar for the Ottomans from the Ak Koyunlu in 1461, and consolidated his rule over the area in 1473 following his defeat of Uzun Hasan at the Battle of Otluk Beli. During the Ottoman Empire the area came to be known as Eastern Karahisar (Karahisar-ı Şarki or Şarkikarahisar). At first the area was attached to Rûm Eyalet (Amasya), but in 1515 was briefly transferred to Trebizond Eyalet, but due to military considerations was transferred to Erzurum Eyalet. In 1538 it was transferred back to Rûm Eyalet. In 1553 back to Erzurum. In 1805 it went to Trebizond. In the 1864 reorganization it became part of Sivas Vilayet where it remained until the end of the Ottoman Empire.

The area had become Christianized under the Roman and Byzantine Empire, and it remained mostly Christian under Ottoman rule. The 1895 census showed that the majority were Armenians, that is Christian. There were also 63 Ottoman Greek speaking towns recorded as still surviving in the area in 1916.

In 1923 the area was made into Şebinkarahisar Province; however, in 1933 it was subsumed into Giresun Province. While a province from 1924 until 1933 it had the districts of Alucra, Suşehri, Koyulhisar and Mesudiye.

Although prone to earthquakes, the 1939 Erzincan earthquake was particularly devastating in Şebinkarahisar District. Because the quake occurred at night and in the winter (28 December), the loss of life was substantial, 1451 people in Şebinkarahisar District lost their lives.

On 7 and 8 August 1961, a devastating fire claimed 288 homes and five shops in the town of Şebinkarahisar.

== Demographics ==
In the census of 1927 there were 18,533 in the district. In the 1997 census there were 43,904, with 70% (31,329) living in the town of Şebinkarahisar, and 29% (12,575) living in and about the district's villages. The census of 2000, showed 74% (39,853) in town, and 26% (14,304) outside, for a total of 54,157.

There is some seasonal variability in the district's population as a significant number of workers move into the large cities, such as Istanbul or Ankara, for work in the summer and return to Şebinkarahisar during the winter months.

== Economics ==
The Persians mined alum from the mountains above the town of Şebinkarahisar, as did the Pontians, the Romans, and the Turks. In fact, one of the Turkish names for the capital was Şapkarahisar (Alum + Black + Fort). A number of uranium prospects have been investigated, and there are a couple of lead-zinc prospects.

Historically the valley of the Kelkit River produced grain and fruit. And, more recently, also tobacco. The district's primary crops are wheat and barley. The fruits raised include: mulberries, pears, plums, quinces, cherries, sour cherries, apples, and peaches, as well as almonds and walnuts. In the uplands cattle and sheep are raised. Beekeeping provides an important source of income.

== Governance ==
District governors (Kaymakammz)

- 2004 Aziz Mercan
- 2012 Anvi Oral.
- 2022– Alay Yazıcı

== Scenic ==
- The village of Kayadibi, 11 km east of the town of Şebinkarahisar, has an old monastery built into a cave. It was founded approximately in 490 AD.
