= List of earthquakes in 1939 =

Earthquakes in 1939
Approximate epicenters of the earthquakes in 1939
- 4.0–5.9 magnitude
- 6.0–6.9 magnitude
- 7.0–7.9 magnitude
- 8.0+ magnitude
- Strongest: Chile, Biobío Region (Magnitude 8.3) January 24
- Deadliest: Turkey, Erzincan Province (Magnitude 7.8) December 26 32,700 deaths
- Total fatalities: 62,860

Number by magnitude
- 9.0+: 0

This is a list of earthquakes in 1939. Only magnitude 6.0 or greater earthquakes appear on the list. Lower magnitude events are included if they have caused death, injury or damage. Events which occurred in remote areas will be excluded from the list as they wouldn't have generated significant media interest. All dates are listed according to UTC time. 1939 was one of the deadliest years for earthquakes with over 60,000 deaths. Two major events resulted in this being the case. In January, a quake struck Chile causing 30,000 deaths, and in December Turkey was shaken by a quake which left 32,700 dead. Several other events occurred in Japan, Peru, Turkey and Ghana which left some fatalities.

== Overall ==
=== By death toll ===
Rank	Death toll	Magnitude	Location	MMI	Depth (km)	Date
1	32,700	7.8	Turkey, Erzincan Province	XII (Extreme)	20.0	December 26
2	30,000	8.3	Chile, Biobío Region	X (Extreme)	35.0	January 25
3	41	6.3	Turkey, İzmir Province	IX (Violent)	35.0	September 21
4	37	0.0	Peru, Madre de Dios Region	( )	0.0	June 24
5	27	7.0	Japan, off the coast of Akita Prefecture, Honshu	( )	10.0	May 1
6	22	6.4	Gold Coast, Central Region (Gold Coast)	IX (Violent)	15.0	June 22
7	13	5.9	Turkey, Erzincan Province	VII (Very strong)	80.0	November 21
8	12	7.8	British Solomon Islands	( )	15.0	April 30

- Note: At least 10 casualties

=== By magnitude ===
Rank	Magnitude	Death toll	Location	MMI	Depth (km)	Date
1	8.3	30,000	Chile, Biobío Region	X (Extreme)	35.0	January 25
2	8.1	0	Dutch East Indies, Gulf of Tomini	( )	35.0	December 21
= 3	7.8	5	New Guinea, south of Bougainville Island	( )	35.0	January 30
= 3	7.8	12	British Solomon Islands	( )	15.0	April 30
= 3	7.8	32,700	Turkey, Erzincan Province	XII (Extreme)	20.0	December 26
4	7.5	0	southern Indian Ocean	( )	15.0	March 21
= 5	7.4	0	Chile, Atacama Region	( )	35.0	April 18
= 5	7.4	0	New Hebrides	( )	135.0	October 17
6	7.3	0	Costa Rica, Alajuela Province	( )	25.0	December 21
= 7	7.2	0	Tonga	( )	100.0	June 8
= 7	7.2	0	New Hebrides	( )	180.0	August 12
8	7.1	0	United States, Near Islands, Alaska	( )	15.0	September 8
= 9	7.0	0	British Solomon Islands	( )	15.0	February 3
= 9	7.0	0	New Hebrides	( )	30.0	April 5
= 9	7.0	0	Russian SFSR, off the coast of Primorski Krai	( )	530.0	April 21
= 9	7.0	27	Japan, off the coast of Akita Prefecture, Honshu	( )	10.0	May 1
= 9	7.0	0	Mexico, Gulf of California	( )	10.0	May 2
= 9	7.0	0	Japan, off the east coast of Honshu	( )	20.0	October 10

- Note: At least 7.0 magnitude

== Notable events ==
=== January ===
January
- Strongest: 8.3 M_{w} Chile
- Deadliest: 8.3 M_{w} Chile; 30,000 deaths
- Total fatalities: 30,005

Number by magnitude
- 8.0–8.9: 1
- 7.0–7.9: 1
- 6.0–6.9: 5
- 5.0–5.9: 1

Date	Country and location	M_{w}	Depth (km)	MMI	Notes	Casualties	
Date	Country and location	M_{w}	Depth (km)	MMI	Notes	Dead	Injured
2	Turkey, south of	5.3	0.0		Major damage was reported. Depth unknown.		
18	Chile, Coquimbo Region	6.2	70.0				
20	Guatemala, off the south coast of	6.5	70.0				
22	New Guinea, off the east coast of	6.2	35.0				
24	Argentina, Santiago del Estero Province	6.0	580.0				
25	Chile, Biobío Region	8.3	35.0	X	The 1939 Chillán earthquake was one of the worst in Chilean history. 30,000 people were killed. Many homes were destroyed and damage costs were around $920 million (1939 rate).	30,000+	
30	New Guinea, south of Bougainville Island	7.8	35.0		5 people were killed and at least 101 were injured. Many homes were destroyed.	5	101+
30	New Guinea, off the east coast of	6.5	200.0				

=== February ===
February
- Strongest: 7.0 M_{w} British Solomon Islands
- Total fatalities: 0

Number by magnitude
- 8.0–8.9: 0
- 7.0–7.9: 1
- 6.0–6.9: 3

Date	Country and location	M_{w}	Depth (km)	MMI	Notes	Casualties	
Date	Country and location	M_{w}	Depth (km)	MMI	Notes	Dead	Injured
3	British Solomon Islands	7.0	15.0				
4	Philippines, east of Mindanao	6.0	100.0				
16	Japan, off the east coast of Honshu	6.6	35.0				
24	United States, south of Alaska Peninsula	6.3	79.0	V			

=== March ===
March
- Strongest: 7.5 M_{w} south Indian Ocean
- Deadliest: 6.7 M_{w} Japan; 1 death
- Total fatalities: 1

Number by magnitude
- 8.0–8.9: 0
- 7.0–7.9: 1
- 6.0–6.9: 3

Date	Country and location	M_{w}	Depth (km)	MMI	Notes	Casualties	
Date	Country and location	M_{w}	Depth (km)	MMI	Notes	Dead	Injured
2	New Guinea, East Sepik Province	6.0	35.0				
8	New Guinea, off the west coast of Bougainville Island	6.3	35.0				
20	Japan, eastern Kyushu	6.7	25.0		A tsunami was generated. 1 person died and a home was destroyed.	1	
21	south Indian Ocean	7.5	15.0				

=== April ===
April
- Strongest: 7.8 M_{w} British Solomon Islands
- Deadliest: 7.8 M_{w} British Solomon Islands; 12 deaths
- Total fatalities: 12

Number by magnitude
- 8.0–8.9: 0
- 7.0–7.9: 4
- 6.0–6.9: 2

Date	Country and location	M_{w}	Depth (km)	MMI	Notes	Casualties	
Date	Country and location	M_{w}	Depth (km)	MMI	Notes	Dead	Injured
5	New Hebrides	7.0	30.0				
18	Chile, Atacama Region	7.4	35.0				
20	New Zealand, off the south coast of South Island	6.0	35.0				
21	Russian SFSR, Primorski Krai	7.0	530.0				
25	Peru, Junin Region	6.2	150.0				
30	British Solomon Islands	7.8	15.0		A tsunami resulted in 12 deaths and some damage. The earthquake also caused the destruction of some homes.	12	

=== May ===
May
- Strongest: 7.0 M_{w} 2 events
- Deadliest: 7.0 M_{w} Japan; 27 deaths
- Total fatalities: 27

Number by magnitude
- 8.0–8.9: 0
- 7.0–7.9: 2
- 6.0–6.9: 9

Date	Country and location	M_{w}	Depth (km)	MMI	Notes	Casualties	
Date	Country and location	M_{w}	Depth (km)	MMI	Notes	Dead	Injured
1	Japan, off the coast of Akita Prefecture, Honshu	7.0	10.0	VII	27 deaths were caused as well as 52 injuries. 479 homes were destroyed. Main article: 1939 Oga earthquake	27	52
1	Japan, off the coast of Akita Prefecture, Honshu	6.5	10.0		Aftershock.		
2	Mexico, Gulf of California	7.0	10.0				
6	Philippines, north of Mindoro	6.5	110.0	V			
8	Portugal, east of the Azores	6.7	10.0	X			
17	Japan, Volcano Islands	6.5	35.0				
19	Bolivia, Oruro Department	6.2	100.0				
22	Dutch East Indies, New Guinea, border region	6.2	35.0				
26	Russian SFSR, Buryatia	6.0	35.0				
26	Dutch East Indies, Papua (province)	6.3	25.0				
27	India, Manipur	6.1	65.7				

=== June ===
June
- Strongest: 7.2 M_{w} Tonga
- Deadliest: 0.0 M_{w} Peru; 37 deaths
- Total fatalities: 59

Number by magnitude
- 8.0–8.9: 0
- 7.0–7.9: 1
- 6.0–6.9: 7

Date	Country and location	M_{w}	Depth (km)	MMI	Notes	Casualties	
Date	Country and location	M_{w}	Depth (km)	MMI	Notes	Dead	Injured
2	Dutch East Indies, Talaud Islands	6.5	35.0				
4	Dutch East Indies, Savu Sea	6.2	80.0				
8	Tonga	7.2	100.0				
9	Dutch East Indies, Papua (province)	6.3	15.0				
13	Dutch East Indies, Molucca Sea	6.7	150.0				
18	Costa Rica, off the east coast of	6.5	70.0				
22	Gold Coast, Central Region (Gold Coast)	6.4	15.0	IX	This was a rare event for the area. 22 people were killed and 130 were hurt. 1,500 homes were destroyed.	22	130
22	Peru, Madre de Dios Region	0.0	0.0		37 deaths were caused as well as some damage. The magnitude and depth were unknown.		
27	Philippines, east of Mindanao	6.6	35.0				

=== July ===
July
- Strongest: 6.8 M_{w} Fiji
- Total fatalities: 0

Number by magnitude
- 8.0–8.9: 0
- 7.0–7.9: 0
- 6.0–6.9: 5

Date	Country and location	M_{w}	Depth (km)	MMI	Notes	Casualties	
Date	Country and location	M_{w}	Depth (km)	MMI	Notes	Dead	Injured
4	Bolivia, Chuquisaca Department	6.6	275.0				
5	Fiji	6.7	650.0				
12	Dutch East Indies, Papua (province)	6.5	20.0				
14	Russian SFSR, Commander Islands	6.5	60.0				
20	Fiji	6.8	635.0				

=== August ===
August
- Strongest: 7.2 M_{w} New Hebrides
- Total fatalities: 0

Number by magnitude
- 8.0–8.9: 0
- 7.0–7.9: 1
- 6.0–6.9: 5

Date	Country and location	M_{w}	Depth (km)	MMI	Notes	Casualties	
Date	Country and location	M_{w}	Depth (km)	MMI	Notes	Dead	Injured
1	Russian SFSR, Kuril Islands	6.5	140.0				
12	New Hebrides	7.2	180.0				
18	New Hebrides	6.5	55.0				
20	United States, Unimak Island, Alaska	6.3	75.0	V			
25	New Guinea, southeast of New Ireland (island)	6.6	90.0				
27	New Hebrides	6.5	280.0				

=== September ===
September
- Strongest: 7.1 M_{w} United States
- Deadliest: 6.3 M_{w} Turkey; 41 deaths
- Total fatalities: 43

Number by magnitude
- 8.0–8.9: 0
- 7.0–7.9: 1
- 6.0–6.9: 4
- 5.0–5.9: 1

Date	Country and location	M_{w}	Depth (km)	MMI	Notes	Casualties	
Date	Country and location	M_{w}	Depth (km)	MMI	Notes	Dead	Injured
8	United States, Near Islands, Alaska	7.1	15.0				
19	China, Yunnan Province	5.5	0.0	VII	2 people died and some homes collapsed. The depth was unknown.	2	
20	Greece, Ionian Sea	6.5	80.0				
20	Peru, Junin Region	6.0	60.0				
22	Turkey, İzmir Province	6.3	35.0	IX	41 people were killed and some damage was caused.	41	
28	Guatemala, Huehuetenango Department	6.2	110.0				

=== October ===
October
- Strongest: 7.4 M_{w} New Hebrides
- Total fatalities: 0

Number by magnitude
- 8.0–8.9: 0
- 7.0–7.9: 2
- 6.0–6.9: 6

Date	Country and location	M_{w}	Depth (km)	MMI	Notes	Casualties	
Date	Country and location	M_{w}	Depth (km)	MMI	Notes	Dead	Injured
5	Bolivia, Potosí Department	6.0	240.0				
7	Dutch East Indies, Banda Sea	6.5	35.0				
7	Chile, Arica y Parinacota Region	6.0	110.0				
10	Japan, off the east coast of Honshu	7.0	20.0				
11	Peru, Arequipa Region	0.0	120.0	VII	Many homes were destroyed. The magnitude was unknown.		
17	New Hebrides	7.4	135.0				
20	Costa Rica, off the south coast of	6.0	35.0				
22	Japan, southeast of Hokkaido	6.0	90.0				
30	Tonga	6.5	150.0				

=== November ===
November
- Strongest: 6.7 M_{w} Afghanistan
- Deadliest: 5.9 M_{w} Turkey; 13 deaths
- Total fatalities: 13

Number by magnitude
- 8.0–8.9: 0
- 7.0–7.9: 0
- 6.0–6.9: 5
- 5.0–5.9: 1

Date	Country and location	M_{w}	Depth (km)	MMI	Notes	Casualties	
Date	Country and location	M_{w}	Depth (km)	MMI	Notes	Dead	Injured
4	Iran, Khuzestan Province	6.0	35.0				
10	New Guinea, Oro Province	6.2	35.0				
17	New Guinea, southwest of Bougainville Island	6.0	140.0				
18	Russian SFSR, Kamchatka Peninsula	6.5	75.0				
21	Turkey, Erzincan Province	5.9	80.0	VII	13 people were killed and some damage was caused.	13	
21	Afghanistan, Badakhshan Province	6.7	190.0		Some damage was caused.		

=== December ===
December
- Strongest: 8.1 M_{w} Dutch East Indies
- Deadliest: 7.8 M_{w} Turkey; 32,700 deaths
- Total fatalities: 32,700

Number by magnitude
- 8.0–8.9: 1
- 7.0–7.9: 2
- 6.0–6.9: 7

Date	Country and location	M_{w}	Depth (km)	MMI	Notes	Casualties	
Date	Country and location	M_{w}	Depth (km)	MMI	Notes	Dead	Injured
5	Guatemala, Retalhuleu Department	6.7	45.0				
16	Russian SFSR, Kuril Islands	6.5	60.0				
20	Dutch East Indies, Flores Sea	6.0	700.0				
21	Costa Rica, Alajuela Province	7.3	25.0				
21	Dutch East Indies, Gulf of Tomini	8.1	35.0		Many homes were destroyed.		
22	Costa Rica, off the west coast of	6.8	25.0				
25	Dutch East Indies, Gulf of Tomini	6.2	125.0		Aftershock.		
26	El Salvador, Usulután Department	6.0	75.0				
26	Turkey, Erzincan Province	7.8	20.0	XII	The 1939 Erzincan earthquake caused major destruction in the area. 32,700 people were killed. Damage costs were $20 million (1939 rate). Scores of homes were ruined.	32,700	
27	Dutch East Indies, off the north coast of Papua (province)	6.5	80.0				
