= 1939 Chillán earthquake =

Deadliest earthquake in Chile

- Location within South America
- UTC time: 1939-01-25 03:32:14
- ISC event: 901785
- USGS-ANSS: ComCat
- Local date: January 24, 1939
- Local time: 23:32
- Magnitude: 8.3 M_{s}
- Depth: 60; 80–100 km
- Epicenter: 36°12′00″S 72°12′00″W
- Type: Normal
- Areas affected: Chillán, Chile
- Max. intensity: MMI X (Extreme)
- Casualties: ~28,000 deaths 40,000 injuries

The 1939 Chillán earthquake occurred in south-central Chile on 24 January with a surface-wave magnitude of 8.3 and a maximum Mercalli intensity of X (Extreme). With a death toll of around 28,000, compared to the 2,231–6,000 (official estimates vary greatly) of the Great Chilean earthquake of 1960, it is the single deadliest earthquake in Chile.

== Earthquake ==
At 23:32, the earth began to shake strongly underneath Chillán, destroying more than half of it, including around 3,500 homes and the recently constructed Casa Rabié which then was in the city. Aftershocks followed although they were less intense, which left the city completely destroyed. Until then, the Cathedral of Chillán had been one of the principal buildings of the area, but it was completely destroyed. The church that was built to replace it was designed specifically to withstand future earthquakes.

At 23:35, Concepción was violently hit. Almost all of the buildings (around 95% of the houses) were completely destroyed. There was a show going on in the theater where the large chandelier started to swing. The people inside were terrified, so they fled down the stairs, but the spiral staircase cracked, causing many people to fall into the gap. In the intersection of O’Higgins and Aníbal Pinto avenue, the bodies accumulated, which were later brought to the cemetery, and interred in large strips of land.

The electricity was cut in all of the city and tens of fires were reported in various points of the city. The potable water supply was also seriously affected. The material damage in all of the city was evaluated to be more than three thousand million pesos. Various emblematic buildings of the city were destroyed, like the central market, Correos de Chile, but the most emblematic was the plaza of independence, which was seriously damaged. Its two towers leaned dangerously, and because of this, they had to be demolished. Another building that was affected was the first building of the old Central Station of Concepción. In 1941, the construction of a second station building began.

== Geology ==
The community of Chillán is situated in the continental territory of Chile. The city of Chillán was built on a tectonic structure at the end of the Tertiary Period in the part of the Longitudinal Valley which is identified with the Central level. Morphologically, the land corresponds to an alluvial plain, which predominates with fluvioglacial sediments, conformed during the Cuaternario by the action of the Rivers Nuble and Cato in the north and the River Chillán in the south, both tributary streams of the large drainage basin of Itata. The natural flow of the enclave of Chillán is confirmed by later geological studies, found the root of the earthquake of 1939, when a prospection of more than 80 meters was carried out, without finding the bedrock.

== Response ==
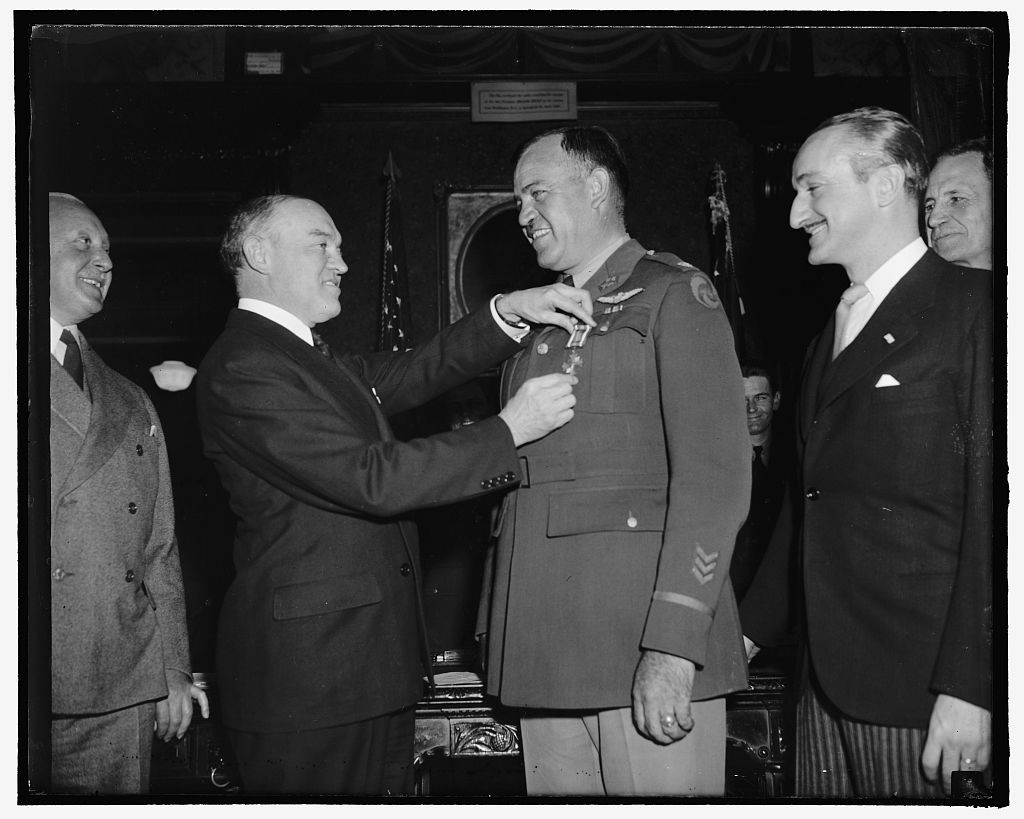
Major Haynes receives the Distinguished Flying Cross for his command of the relief flight.

At the start of February 1939, Major Caleb V. Haynes of the U.S. Army Air Corps commanded a special "flight of mercy" with medical supplies from the American Red Cross loaded in the experimental prototype Boeing XB-15 bomber. The airplane departed from Langley Field, Virginia for Santiago, Chile, and covered a distance 4,933 miles in 49 hours and 18 minutes, with only two stops to refuel in the Panama Canal Zone and in Lima, Peru. The crew was also awarded the Mackay Trophy for 1939 for the "most meritorious flight of the year" made by members of the Air Corps.

In the aftermath, the Chilean government created CORFO (Spanish acronym for Production Development Corporation) to help in the reconstruction of the country and to industrialize the country, mechanize the agriculture and help mining to develop.

== Gallery ==
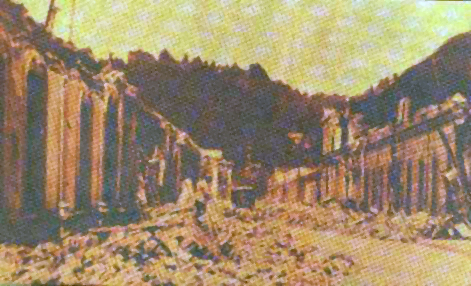
Concepción

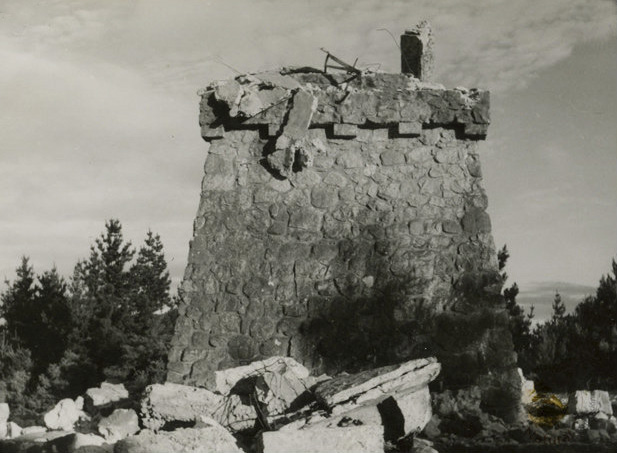
"El Mirador Alemán", in Concepción

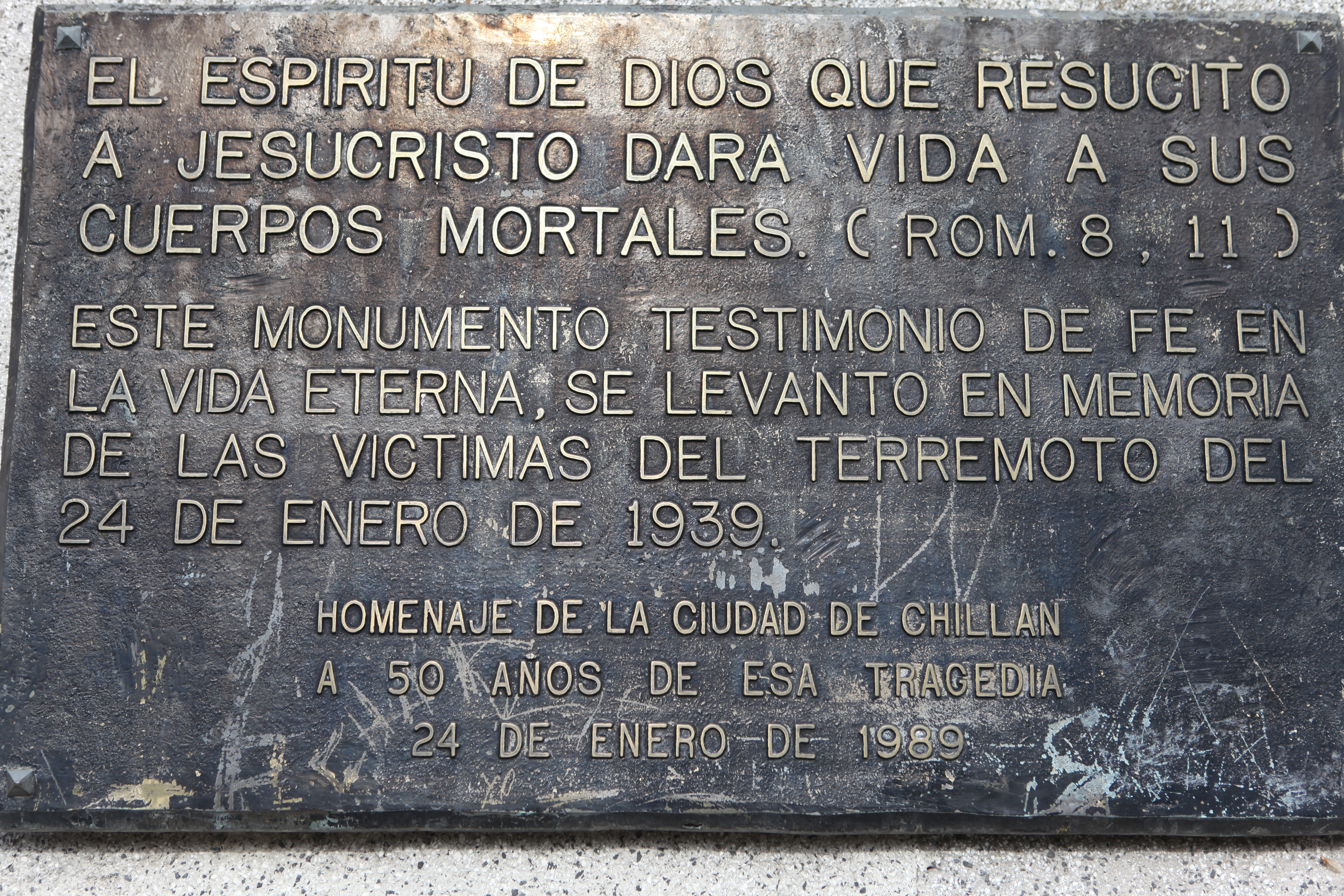
A memorial placard next to the cathedral in Chillán commemorates the victims 50 years later

== See also ==
- List of earthquakes in 1939
- List of earthquakes in Chile
