= Aram Haigaz =

Armenian writer

- Born: Aram Chekenian; March 22, 1900; Shabin Karahisar, Ottoman Empire
- Died: March 10, 1986 (aged 85); Queens, New York, U.S.

Aram Haigaz (Armenian: Արամ Հայկազ; March 22, 1900 – March 10, 1986) was the pen name of Aram Chekenian, an Armenian-American writer. He was born in the town of Şebinkarahisar in the Ottoman Empire and survived the Armenian genocide in 1915. He was a young boy when his birthplace was attacked, and his first book, The Fall of the Aerie, published in English translation in 1935, is often cited by scholars and historians for its eyewitness details. He wrote ten books in his lifetime, as well as articles and essays for Armenian newspapers and magazines.

== Early years ==
Aram Haigaz’s home town was situated at the foot of a mountain in the northeastern area of present day Turkey. In the summer of 1915 when the military forces of the enemy were near, in what became known as the Shabin-Karahisar uprising, the entire Armenian population of 5,000 set fire to their homes and fields and climbed up the mountain to the remains of an old Roman fort at its peak. They took food and animals with them and fought for almost one month, until forced by famine to surrender. Of the more than 5,000 who climbed to the fort, only a handful survived. Aram Haigaz’s brothers, his father and other relatives were among those killed. He and his mother were sent on deportation, a forced march leading to the Syrian desert. Aram Haigaz survived by converting to Islam, which allowed him to live as a Muslim, with a Turkish master, until he escaped to freedom. His memoir of that time, Four Years in the Mountains of Kurdistan, describes his life as a shepherd and servant, and how he grew from boyhood to a young man among the Kurdish tribesmen and chieftains, when Turkey was still the Ottoman Empire.

== America ==
After escaping to Istanbul in 1919, Aram Haigaz was reunited with an aunt; he spent some time in an orphanage run by American missionaries, and also attended the Getronagan High School, where literature was one of his subjects, taught by famous writer and literary critic Hagop Oshagan. Within two years, in 1921, he sailed for the United States. He worked as an apprentice photo-engraver at The Daily Mirror, a New York City newspaper, and studied English at night, reading extensively the great world and American classics, from Kipling and Balzac to Poe. In 1922 he started writing for Armenian publications and took a pen name because he feared the stigma of rejections. At age 22, Aram Chekemian became Aram Haigaz.

== His writing ==
When he died at age 85, Aram Haigaz had published ten books that were read by Armenians in many countries. Except for the autobiographical accounts of his early years, much of his output was in the form of humorous short stories and vignettes of contemporary life in the United States. His work was highly personal, and he wrote in a natural, conversational style about seemingly inconsequential events – what was in a sandwich, going to the wrong funeral, a stay in the hospital, his son's graduation. His stories did not dwell on the pain of the past, and he became one of the most popular Armenian writers of his time. He received several Armenian literary awards and tributes and in 1972, the Jubilee of his fifty years as a writer was marked with programs in cities in the United States, Canada and Lebanon.

He was married in Paris to a young Armenian woman whom he had met in school in Istanbul. He lived in Rego Park, New York, and had two children, a son and daughter. He died in New York, from complications of pneumonia, at age 85.

== Bibliography ==
The Fall of the Aerie was reissued in 2010 to commemorate his 110th birthday tribute by Hamazkayin, the Armenian Educational and Cultural Society. In recent years, several new volumes of his work have been published in Armenia, the first in 2008 called Aram Haigaz, Letters; from 2010-2013, four other volumes of essays and articles called Forgotten Pages; and a collection of his short stories, A Living Tree, published in 2013.

In 2015, to coincide with the centenary of the Armenian genocide, Four Years in the Mountains of Kurdistan was published in English in a new translation by his daughter, Iris Chekenian.

Except for his first book, all the works of Aram Haigaz were written and published in Armenian. He did not say much about his writing, but he did say this: “I do not write to benefit anyone, not to teach anyone, or to preach or spread my beliefs... But my pride in being Armenian is always present in every line I write.”

- The Fall of the Aerie - 1935
- The Call of the Race, vol. I - 1949
- The Call of the Race, vol. II - 1954
- Shabin Karahisar and Its Heroic Struggle - 1957
- Four Worlds - 1962
- Hotel - 1967
- Yearning - 1971
- Four Years in the Mountains of Kurdistan - 1972
- Live, Children! - 1973
- Happiness - 1978
