= Shabin-Karahisar uprising =

Resistance effort by the Armenian militia during the Armenian genocide

Shabin-Karahisar Resistance
- Part of Armenian Resistance
Date	June 2–30, 1915
Location	Castle at Şebinkarahisar
Result	Suppression of the uprising: massacre of the rest of the Armenians

Belligerents
Ottoman Empire	Hunchaks

Commanders and leaders
Kazim Pasha	Aram Manukian

Strength
1,000	250

Casualties and losses
2 officers and 82 soldiers, 30 civilians	230 killed (including civilians)

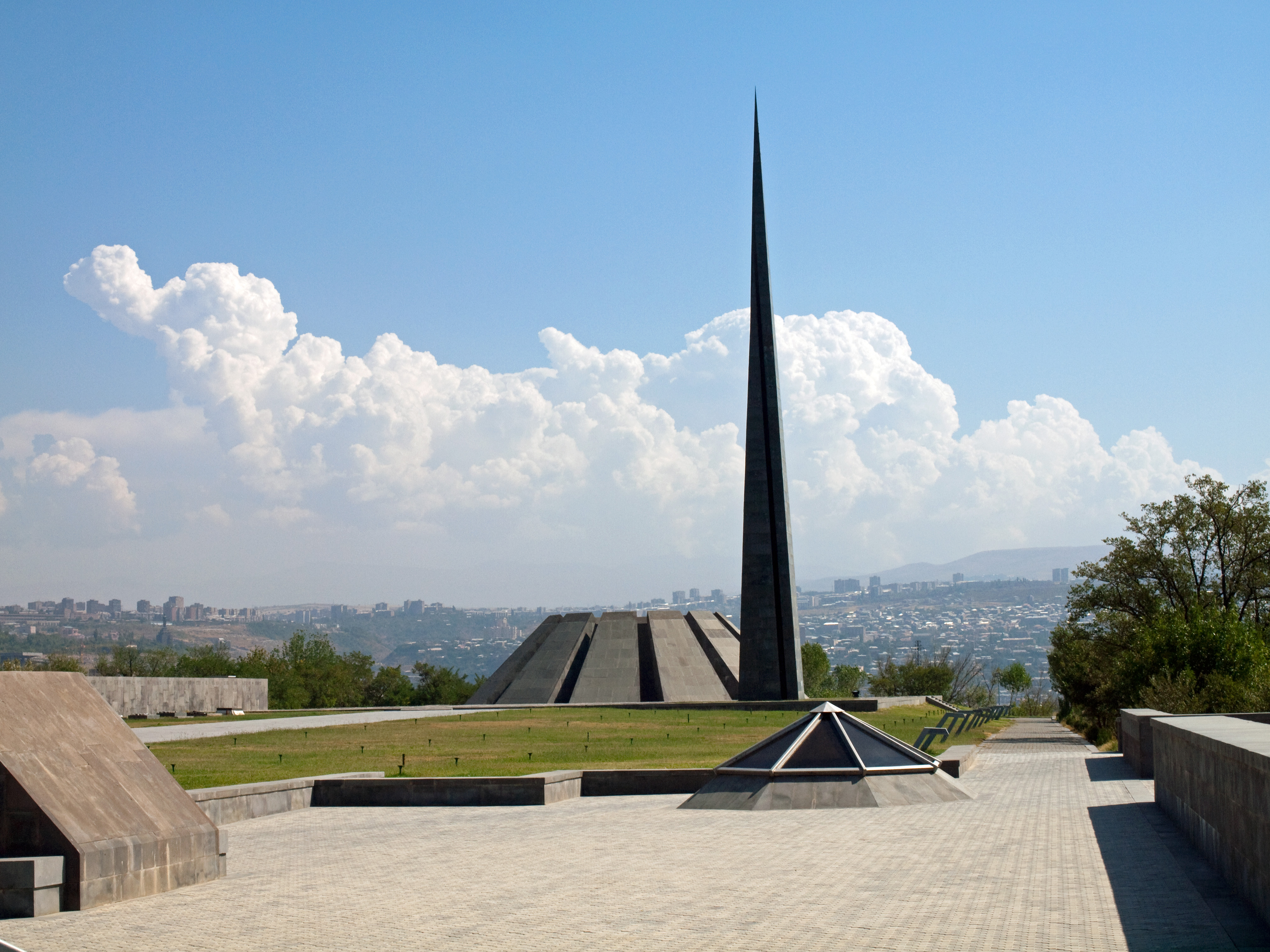
Genocide Monument at Tsitsernakaberd

The Shabin-Karahisar uprising (June 2–30, 1915) was a resistance effort by the Armenian militia of the Hunchaks of the Giresun Province against Ottoman troops during the Armenian genocide. They had resisted the Ottoman onslaught for the duration of a month. The Armenians had positioned themselves in a fort right outside the town where about 250 men fought off Turkish soldiers.

== Background ==
News of the massacres in other regions of Western Armenia made the people of Shabin-Karahisar think that their "turn" was coming soon. In April, 1915, hundreds of young men were suddenly imprisoned. In June, 1915, the region's Armenian religious leader was executed. Then, 200 Armenian merchants were killed as a part of a systematic campaign of genocide by the Ottoman authorities.

The able-bodied Armenians of Shabin-Karahisar thus decided to confront the Ottomans. They started by burning their own homes and fortified themselves in a nearby castle. Many Ottoman soldiers died in battle those days. After weeks of confrontation, the Armenian militia had no ammunition left. They decided to come out from the castle and fight with their own bare hands. Now, there were only women, children, and elderly in the city, who were all massacred following the resistance's suppression.

Shabin Karahisar (Şebinkarahisar) was the birthplace of Andranik Ozanian, a well-known Armenian fedayee.

The resistance at Shabin Karahisar was chronicled by Aram Haigaz, who survived the siege and subsequent deportation, in his book The Fall of the Airie.

== See also ==
- Musa Dagh
- Şebinkarahisar
