= Provinces of Turkey =

Administrative division of Turkey

Provinces of Turkey Türkiye'nin illeri (Turkish)
- Category: Unitary state
- Location: (Turkey) Turkish Republic
- Found in: Regions
- Number: 81
- Populations: 82,836 (Bayburt) – 15,754,053 (Istanbul) as of 31 December 2025
- Areas: 850 km^{2} (327 sq mi) (Yalova) – 38,260 km^{2} (14,771 sq mi) (Konya)
- Government: Provincial government, National government
- Subdivisions: İlçe (Districts)

Turkey is divided into 81 provinces (Turkish: il). Each province is divided into a number of districts (ilçe). Each provincial government is seated in the central district (merkez ilçe). For non-metropolitan municipality designated provinces, the central district bears the name of the province (e.g. the city/district of Rize is the central district of Rize Province). In the Ottoman Empire, the corresponding unit was the vilayet.

Each province is administered by an appointed governor (vali) from the Ministry of the Interior.

== Background ==
After the collapse of the Ottoman Empire and the official establishment of the Republic of Turkey on 29 October 1923, changes were made to the administrative system. Two years later, Ardahan, Beyoğlu, Çatalca, Tunceli, Ergani, Gelibolu, Genç, Kozan, Oltu, Muş, Siverek and Üsküdar provinces were transformed into districts. In 1927, Doğubayazıt was transformed into a district and was made a part of Ağrı. In 1929, Muş became a province again and Bitlis became a district. Four years later, Aksaray, Cebelibereket, Hakkâri and Şebinkarahisar became districts, Mersin and Silifke were merged to form a new province called İçel, and Artvin and Rize were merged to form a new province called Çoruh, bringing the number down to fifty-six. In 1936, Rize, Tunceli and Hakkâri became provinces again, in the same year Dersim was renamed Tunceli; 3 years later in 1939, Hatay was annexed to Turkey and became a province. In 1953, it was decided that Uşak would become a province and that Kırşehir would be transformed into a district, one year later in 1954 Adıyaman, Nevşehir and Sakarya gained province status. In 1956, the name of Çoruh province was changed to Artvin, and in 1957 Kırşehir's province status was restored. After this year, there were no changes in the number of provinces for the next 32 years until Aksaray, Bayburt, Karaman and Kırıkkale became provinces in 1989 along with Batman and Şırnak in 1990; Bartın in 1991; Ardahan and Iğdır in 1992; Yalova, Karabük and Kilis in 1995; Osmaniye in 1996, and Düzce in 1999.

== Provinces ==
Below is a list of the 81 provinces of Turkey, sorted according to their license plate codes. Initially, the order of the codes matched the alphabetical order of the province names. After Zonguldak (code 67), the ordering is not alphabetical, but in the order of the creation of provinces, as these provinces were created more recently and thus their plate numbers were assigned after the initial set of codes had been assigned.

Provinces and metropolitan municipalities of Turkey

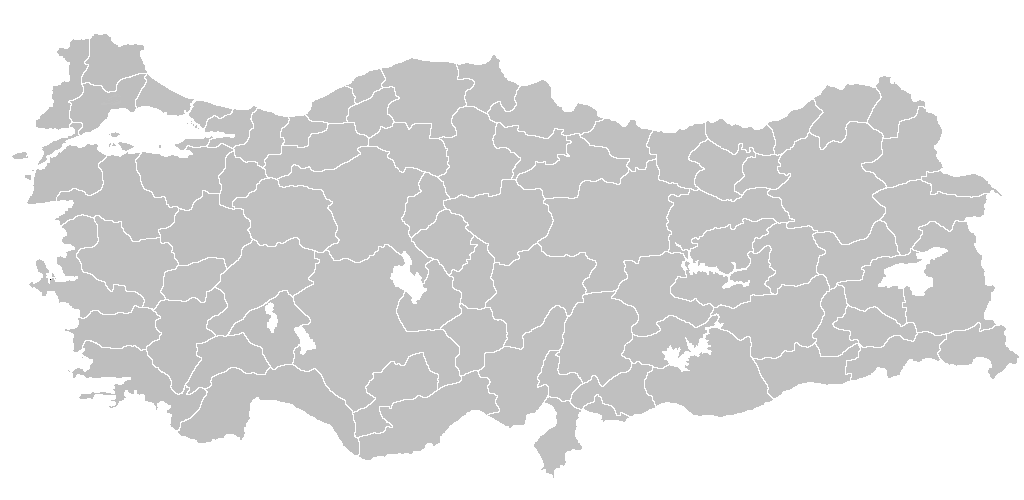

	Name	Capital	Area		Population census (Oct. 2000)	Population census (Nov. 2011)	Population estimate (Dec. 2021)	Population density (per km²) 2021
	Name	Capital	km^{2}	sq mi	Population census (Oct. 2000)	Population census (Nov. 2011)	Population estimate (Dec. 2021)	Population density (per km²) 2021
01	Adana	Adana	14,045.56	5,423.02	1,849,478	2,102,375	2,263,373	161.1
02	Adıyaman	Adıyaman	7,606.16	2,936.75	623,811	594,163	632,148	83.1
03	Afyonkarahisar	Afyonkarahisar	14,718.63	5,682.89	812,416	701,461	744,179	50.6
04	Ağrı	Ağrı	11,498.67	4,439.66	528,744	553,241	524,069	45.6
05	Amasya	Amasya	5,703.78	2,202.24	365,231	323,331	335,331	58.8
06	Ankara	Ankara	25,401.94	9,807.74	4,007,860	4,868,418	5,747,325	226.3
07	Antalya	Antalya	20,790.56	8,027.28	1,719,751	2,035,563	2,619,832	126
08	Artvin	Artvin	7,367.10	2,844.45	191,934	166,177	169,543	23
09	Aydın	Aydın	7,904.43	3,051.92	950,757	999,131	1,134,031	143.5
10	Balıkesir	Balıkesir	14,472.73	5,587.95	1,076,347	1,155,216	1,250,610	86.4
11	Bilecik	Bilecik	4,306.77	1,662.85	194,326	203,157	228,334	53
12	Bingöl	Bingöl	8,253.51	3,186.70	253,739	261,276	283,112	34.3
13	Bitlis	Bitlis	7,094.50	2,739.20	388,678	336,226	352,277	49.7
14	Bolu	Bolu	8,323.39	3,213.68	270,654	276,976	320,014	38.4
15	Burdur	Burdur	7,134.95	2,754.82	256,803	250,984	273,716	38.4
16	Bursa	Bursa	10,886.38	4,203.25	2,125,140	2,640,128	3,147,818	289.2
17	Çanakkale	Çanakkale	9,950.43	3,841.88	464,975	489,298	557,276	56
18	Çankırı	Çankırı	7,491.89	2,892.63	270,355	175,716	196,515	26.2
19	Çorum	Çorum	12,796.21	4,940.64	597,065	534,825	526,282	41.1
20	Denizli	Denizli	11,804.19	4,557.62	850,029	940,532	1,051,056	89
21	Diyarbakır	Diyarbakır	15,204.01	5,870.30	1,362,708	1,561,110	1,791,373	117.8
22	Edirne	Edirne	6,097.91	2,354.42	402,606	400,554	412,115	67.6
23	Elazığ	Elazığ	9,281.45	3,583.59	569,616	559,063	588,088	63.4
24	Erzincan	Erzincan	11,727.55	4,528.03	316,841	214,863	237,351	20.2
25	Erzurum	Erzurum	25,330.90	9,780.32	937,389	781,626	756,893	29.9
26	Eskişehir	Eskişehir	13,902.03	5,367.60	706,009	778,421	898,369	64.6
27	Gaziantep	Gaziantep	6,844.84	2,642.81	1,285,249	1,739,569	2,130,432	311.2
28	Giresun	Giresun	6,831.58	2,637.69	523,819	420,433	450,154	65.9
29	Gümüşhane	Gümüşhane	6,437.01	2,485.34	186,953	129,045	150,119	23.3
30	Hakkâri	Hakkâri	7,178.88	2,771.78	236,581	271,405	278,218	38.8
31	Hatay	Antakya	5,831.36	2,251.50	1,253,726	1,472,282	1,670,712	286.5
32	Isparta	Isparta	8,871.08	3,425.14	513,681	412,039	445,678	50.2
33	Mersin	Mersin	15,512.25	5,989.31	1,651,400	1,660,522	1,891,145	121.9
34	Istanbul		5,315.33	2,052.26	10,018,735	13,565,798	15,840,900	2980.2
35	İzmir	İzmir	12,015.61	4,639.25	3,370,866	3,952,036	4,425,789	368.3
36	Kars	Kars	10,139.09	3,914.72	325,016	306,238	281,077	27.7
37	Kastamonu	Kastamonu	13,157.98	5,080.32	375,476	360,694	375,592	28.5
38	Kayseri	Kayseri	17,109.33	6,605.95	1,060,432	1,251,907	1,434,357	83.8
39	Kırklareli	Kırklareli	6,299.78	2,432.36	328,461	340,977	366,363	58.2
40	Kırşehir	Kırşehir	6,530.32	2,521.37	253,239	221,935	242,944	37.2
41	Kocaeli	İzmit	3,625.29	1,399.73	1,206,085	1,595,643	2,033,441	560.9
42	Konya	Konya	40,813.52	15,758.19	2,192,166	2,033,227	2,277,017	55.8
43	Kütahya	Kütahya	12,013.57	4,638.47	656,903	564,403	578,640	48.2
44	Malatya	Malatya	12,102.70	4,672.88	853,658	749,225	808,692	66.8
45	Manisa	Manisa	13,228.50	5,107.55	1,260,169	1,337,731	1,456,626	110.1
46	Kahramanmaraş	Kahramanmaraş	14,456.74	5,581.78	1,002,384	1,052,336	1,171,298	81
47	Mardin	Mardin	8,806.04	3,400.03	705,098	758,181	862,757	98
48	Muğla	Muğla	12,949.21	4,999.72	715,328	837,804	1,021,141	78.9
49	Muş	Muş	8,067.16	3,114.75	453,654	412,430	405,228	50.2
50	Nevşehir	Nevşehir	5,391.64	2,081.72	309,914	284,150	308,003	57.1
51	Niğde	Niğde	7,365.29	2,843.75	348,081	337,456	363,725	49.4
52	Ordu	Ordu	5,952.49	2,298.27	887,765	712,998	760,872	127.8
53	Rize	Rize	3,921.98	1,514.28	365,938	322,367	345,662	88.1
54	Sakarya	Adapazarı	4,880.19	1,884.25	756,168	886,382	1,060,876	217.4
55	Samsun	Samsun	9,364.10	3,615.50	1,209,137	1,250,598	1,371,274	146.4
56	Siirt	Siirt	5,473.29	2,113.25	263,676	309,599	331,980	60.7
57	Sinop	Sinop	5,816.55	2,245.78	225,574	203,288	218,408	37.5
58	Sivas	Sivas	28,567.34	11,029.91	755,091	627,195	636,121	22.3
59	Tekirdağ	Tekirdağ	6,342.30	2,448.78	623,591	824,223	1,113,400	175.6
60	Tokat	Tokat	10,072.62	3,889.06	828,027	592,481	602,567	59.8
61	Trabzon	Trabzon	4,664.04	1,800.80	975,137	757,857	816,684	175.1
62	Tunceli	Tunceli	7,685.66	2,967.45	93,584	84,896	83,645	10.9
63	Şanlıurfa	Şanlıurfa	19,336.21	7,465.75	1,443,422	1,701,127	2,143,020	110.8
64	Uşak	Uşak	5,363.09	2,070.70	322,313	340,636	373,183	69.6
65	Van	Van	19,414.14	7,495.84	877,524	1,059,734	1,141,015	58.8
66	Yozgat	Yozgat	14,074.09	5,434.04	682,919	465,214	418,500	29.7
67	Zonguldak	Zonguldak	3,309.86	1,277.94	615,599	614,775	589,684	178.2
68	Aksaray	Aksaray	7,965.51	3,075.50	396,084	379,163	429,069	53.9
69	Bayburt	Bayburt	3,739.08	1,443.67	97,358	76,859	85,042	22.7
70	Karaman	Karaman	8,868.90	3,424.30	243,210	234,441	258,838	29.2
71	Kırıkkale	Kırıkkale	4,569.76	1,764.39	383,508	276,847	275,968	60.4
72	Batman	Batman	4,659.21	1,798.93	456,734	520,883	626,319	134.4
73	Şırnak	Şırnak	7,151.57	2,761.24	353,197	453,828	546,589	76.4
74	Bartın	Bartın	2,080.36	803.23	184,178	187,129	201,711	97
75	Ardahan	Ardahan	4,967.63	1,918.01	133,756	107,776	94,932	19.1
76	Iğdır	Iğdır	3,587.81	1,385.26	168,634	187,842	203,159	56.6
77	Yalova	Yalova	850.46	328.36	168,593	205,664	291,001	342.2
78	Karabük	Karabük	4,108.80	1,586.42	225,102	220,401	249,287	60.7
79	Kilis	Kilis	1,427.76	551.26	114,724	124,276	145,826	102.1
80	Osmaniye	Osmaniye	3,195.99	1,233.98	458,782	483,639	553,012	173
81	Düzce	Düzce	2,592.95	1,001.14	314,266	342,281	400,976	154.6

== Codes ==
The province's ISO code suffix number, the first two digits of the vehicle registration plates of Turkey, and the first digits of the postal codes in Turkey are the same. The Nomenclature of Territorial Units for Statistics (NUTS) codes are different.

Name	ISO 3166-2	NUTS	Phone prefix	Statistical Region (NUTS-1)
Adana	TR-01	TR621	322	Mediterranean
Adıyaman	TR-02	TRC12	416	Southeast Anatolia
Afyonkarahisar	TR-03	TR332	272	Aegean
Ağrı	TR-04	TRA21	472	Northeast Anatolia
Aksaray	TR-68	TR712	382	Central Anatolia
Amasya	TR-05	TR834	358	West Black Sea
Ankara	TR-06	TR510	312	West Anatolia
Antalya	TR-07	TR611	242	Mediterranean
Ardahan	TR-75	TRA24	478	Northeast Anatolia
Artvin	TR-08	TR905	466	East Black Sea
Aydın	TR-09	TR321	256	Aegean
Balıkesir	TR-10	TR221	266	West Marmara
Bartın	TR-74	TR813	378	West Black Sea
Batman	TR-72	TRC32	488	Southeast Anatolia
Bayburt	TR-69	TRA13	458	Northeast Anatolia
Bilecik	TR-11	TR413	228	East Marmara
Bingöl	TR-12	TRB13	426	Central East Anatolia
Bitlis	TR-13	TRB23	434	Central East Anatolia
Bolu	TR-14	TR424	374	East Marmara
Burdur	TR-15	TR613	248	Mediterranean
Bursa	TR-16	TR411	224	East Marmara
Çanakkale	TR-17	TR222	286	West Marmara
Çankırı	TR-18	TR822	376	West Black Sea
Çorum	TR-19	TR833	364	West Black Sea
Denizli	TR-20	TR322	258	Aegean
Diyarbakır	TR-21	TRC22	412	Southeast Anatolia
Düzce	TR-81	TR423	380	East Marmara
Edirne	TR-22	TR212	284	West Marmara
Elazığ	TR-23	TRB12	424	Central East Anatolia
Erzincan	TR-24	TRA12	446	Northeast Anatolia
Erzurum	TR-25	TRA11	442	Northeast Anatolia
Eskişehir	TR-26	TR412	222	East Marmara
Gaziantep	TR-27	TRC11	342	Southeast Anatolia
Giresun	TR-28	TR903	454	East Black Sea
Gümüşhane	TR-29	TR906	456	East Black Sea
Hakkari	TR-30	TRB24	438	Central East Anatolia
Hatay	TR-31	TR631	326	Mediterranean
Iğdır	TR-76	TRA23	476	Northeast Anatolia
Isparta	TR-32	TR612	246	Mediterranean
Istanbul-I (Thrace)	TR-34	TR100	212	Istanbul
Istanbul-II (Anatolia)	TR-34	TR100	216	Istanbul
İzmir	TR-35	TR310	232	Aegean
Kahramanmaraş	TR-46	TR632	344	Mediterranean
Karabük	TR-78	TR812	370	West Black Sea
Karaman	TR-70	TR522	338	West Anatolia
Kars	TR-36	TRA22	474	Northeast Anatolia
Kastamonu	TR-37	TR821	366	West Black Sea
Kayseri	TR-38	TR721	352	Central Anatolia
Kilis	TR-79	TRC13	348	Southeast Anatolia
Kırıkkale	TR-71	TR711	318	Central Anatolia
Kırklareli	TR-39	TR213	288	West Marmara
Kırşehir	TR-40	TR715	386	Central Anatolia
Kocaeli (İzmit)	TR-41	TR421	262	East Marmara
Konya	TR-42	TR521	332	West Anatolia
Kütahya	TR-43	TR333	274	Aegean
Malatya	TR-44	TRB11	422	Central East Anatolia
Manisa	TR-45	TR331	236	Aegean
Mardin	TR-47	TRC31	482	Southeast Anatolia
Mersin	TR-33	TR622	324	Mediterranean
Muğla	TR-48	TR323	252	Aegean
Muş	TR-49	TRB22	436	Central East Anatolia
Nevşehir	TR-50	TR714	384	Central Anatolia
Niğde	TR-51	TR713	388	Central Anatolia
Ordu	TR-52	TR902	452	East Black Sea
Osmaniye	TR-80	TR633	328	Mediterranean
Rize	TR-53	TR904	464	East Black Sea
Sakarya (Adapazarı)	TR-54	TR422	264	East Marmara
Samsun	TR-55	TR831	362	West Black Sea
Şanlıurfa	TR-63	TRC21	414	Southeast Anatolia
Siirt	TR-56	TRC34	484	Southeast Anatolia
Sinop	TR-57	TR823	368	West Black Sea
Sivas	TR-58	TRC33	346	Central Anatolia
Şırnak	TR-73	TR722	486	Southeast Anatolia
Tekirdağ	TR-59	TR211	282	West Marmara
Tokat	TR-60	TR832	356	West Black Sea
Trabzon	TR-61	TR901	462	East Black Sea
Tunceli	TR-62	TRB14	428	Central East Anatolia
Uşak	TR-64	TR334	276	Aegean
Van	TR-65	TRB21	432	Central East Anatolia
Yalova	TR-77	TR425	226	East Marmara
Yozgat	TR-66	TR723	354	Central Anatolia
Zonguldak	TR-67	TR811	372	West Black Sea

== Defunct provinces ==
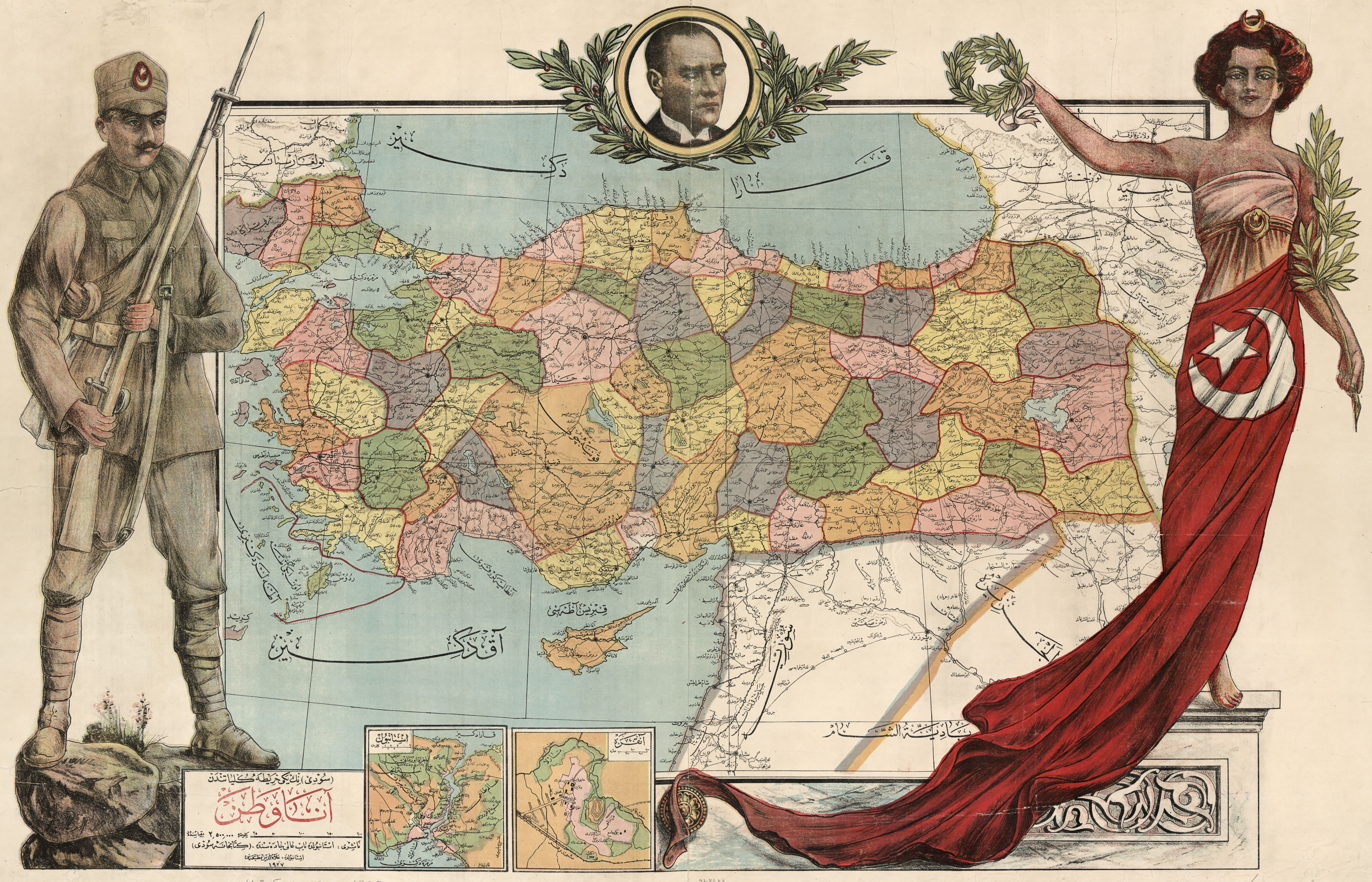
A 1927 map of the provinces of Turkey which was published before the alphabet reform

- Çatalca, now part of Istanbul Province
- Gelibolu, now part of Çanakkale Province
- İçel (Silifke), now part of Mersin Province
- Kozan, now part of Adana Province
- Şebinkarahisar, now part of Giresun Province
- Elazığ Madeni, now part of Elazığ Province
- Genç, now part of Bingöl Province
- Doğubayazıt, now part of Ağrı Province
- Siverek, now part of Şanlıurfa Province
- Biga, now part of Çanakkale Province
- Ergani, now part of Diyarbakır Province
- Oltu, now part of Erzurum Province
- Beyoğlu, now part of Istanbul Province
- Üsküdar, now part of Istanbul Province
- Batum, now part of the Autonomous Republic of Adjara
- Adalar, now part of Istanbul Province

== See also ==
- Provinces of Turkey by population
- Geographical regions of Turkey
- Districts of Turkey
- Villages of Turkey
- Metropolitan centers in Turkey
