= Koloneia (theme) =

Province of the Byzantine Empire

Theme of Koloneia Κολωνεία, θέμα Κολωνείας
- Theme of the Byzantine Empire
- before 863 – 1070s
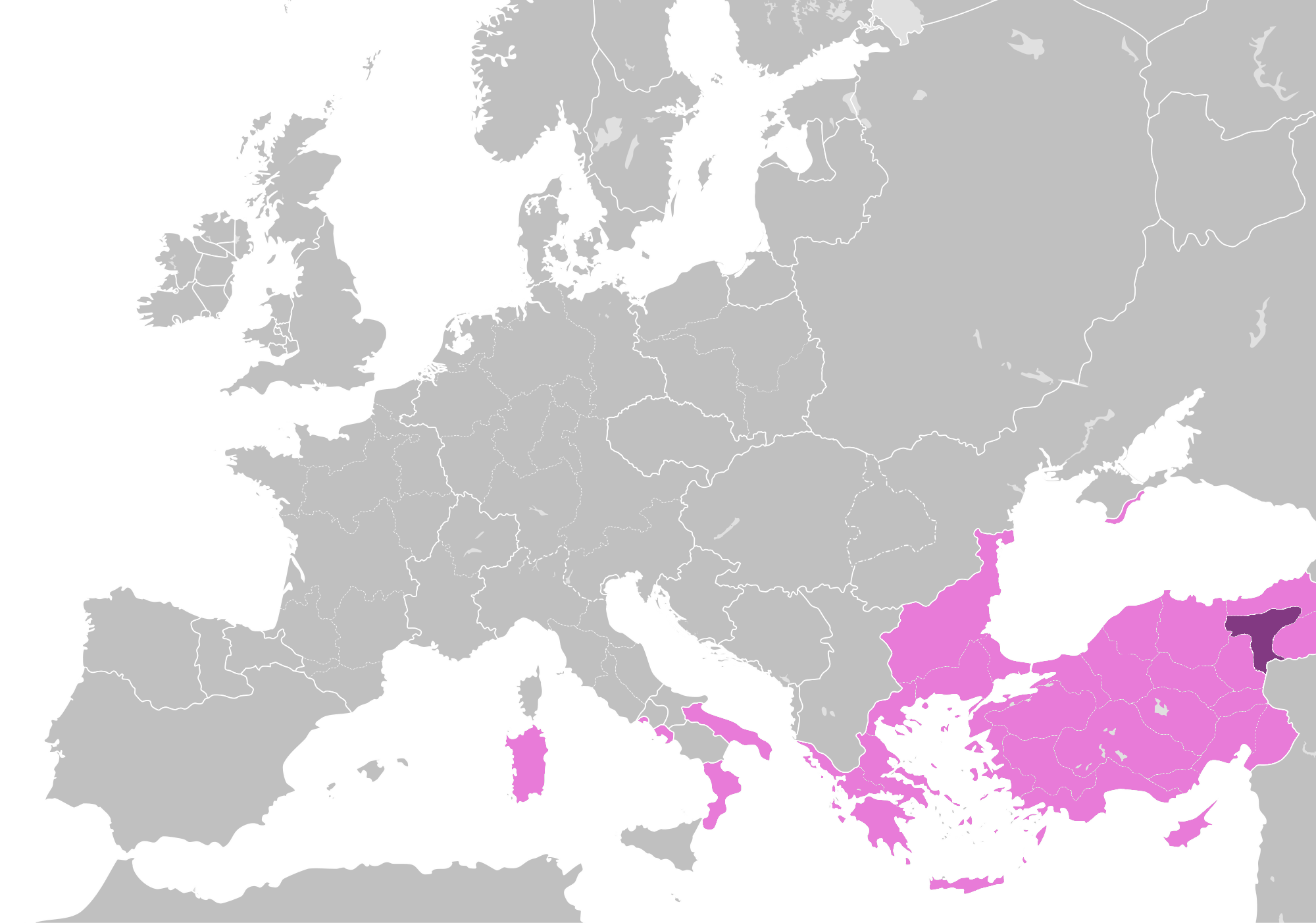
- Map of the Theme of Koloneia within the Byzantine Empire in 1000.
- Historical era: Middle Ages
  - Established: before 863
  - Fall to the Seljuks.: 31 October 1070
- Today part of: Turkey

The Theme of Koloneia (Greek: θέμα Κολωνείας) was a small military-civilian province (thema or theme) of the Byzantine Empire located in northern Cappadocia and the southern Pontus, in modern Turkey. It was founded sometime in the mid-9th century and survived until it was conquered by the Seljuk Turks soon after the Battle of Manzikert in 1071.

== History ==
Originally part of the Armeniac Theme, the theme was formed around the city of Koloneia on the river Lykos (modern Şebinkarahisar). The theme is attested for the first time in 863, but it apparently existed as a separate district earlier: Nicolas Oikonomides interprets a reference by the Arab geographer al-Masudi to mean that it constituted first a kleisoura (a fortified frontier district). In addition, a version of the Life of the 42 Martyrs of Amorium mentions that Emperor Theophilos (r. 829–842) appointed a certain spatharios Kallistos as its doux in circa 842, making it the likely date of its elevation to a full theme (alongside neighbouring Chaldia).

Koloneia's remote location preserved it from the worst of the Arab raids, except for a major raid by Sayf al-Dawla in 939/940. In 1057, the local regiment, under Katakalon Kekaumenos, supported the uprising of Isaac I Komnenos. In 1069, the theme was occupied by the rebel Norman mercenary Robert Crispin. The region fell to the Seljuk Turks soon after the Battle of Manzikert in 1071.

=== Location ===
In the De Thematibus, Emperor Constantine VII Porphyrogennetos (r. 913–959) describes the theme as a small circumscription, encompassing, aside from Koloneia, Neocaesarea in the east, Arabraca, Mount Phalakros (probably modern Karaçam Dağı), Nicopolis and Tephrike. It also comprised sixteen unnamed fortresses. Porphyrogennetos also records that his father, Leo VI the Wise (r. 886–912), separated the tourma of Kamacha from Koloneia to form (along with Keltzene) the new theme of Mesopotamia.

== Sources ==
- Bryer, Anthony; Winfield, David (1985). Byzantine Monuments and Topography of the Pontos, Volume 1. Washington, District of Columbia: Dumbarton Oaks Research Library and Collection. ISBN 0-88402-122-X.
- Kazhdan, Alexander, ed. (1991). The Oxford Dictionary of Byzantium. Oxford and New York: Oxford University Press. ISBN 0-19-504652-8.
- Oikonomides, Nicolas (1972). Les listes de préséance byzantines des IXe et Xe Siècles (in French). Paris: Editions du Centre National de la Recherche Scientifique.
- Pertusi, A. (1952). Constantino Porfirogenito: De Thematibus (in Italian). Rome: Biblioteca Apostolica Vaticana.
