= Şebinkarahisar Castle =

Castle in Şebinkarahisar, Turkey

- Şebinkarahisar, Giresun in Turkey
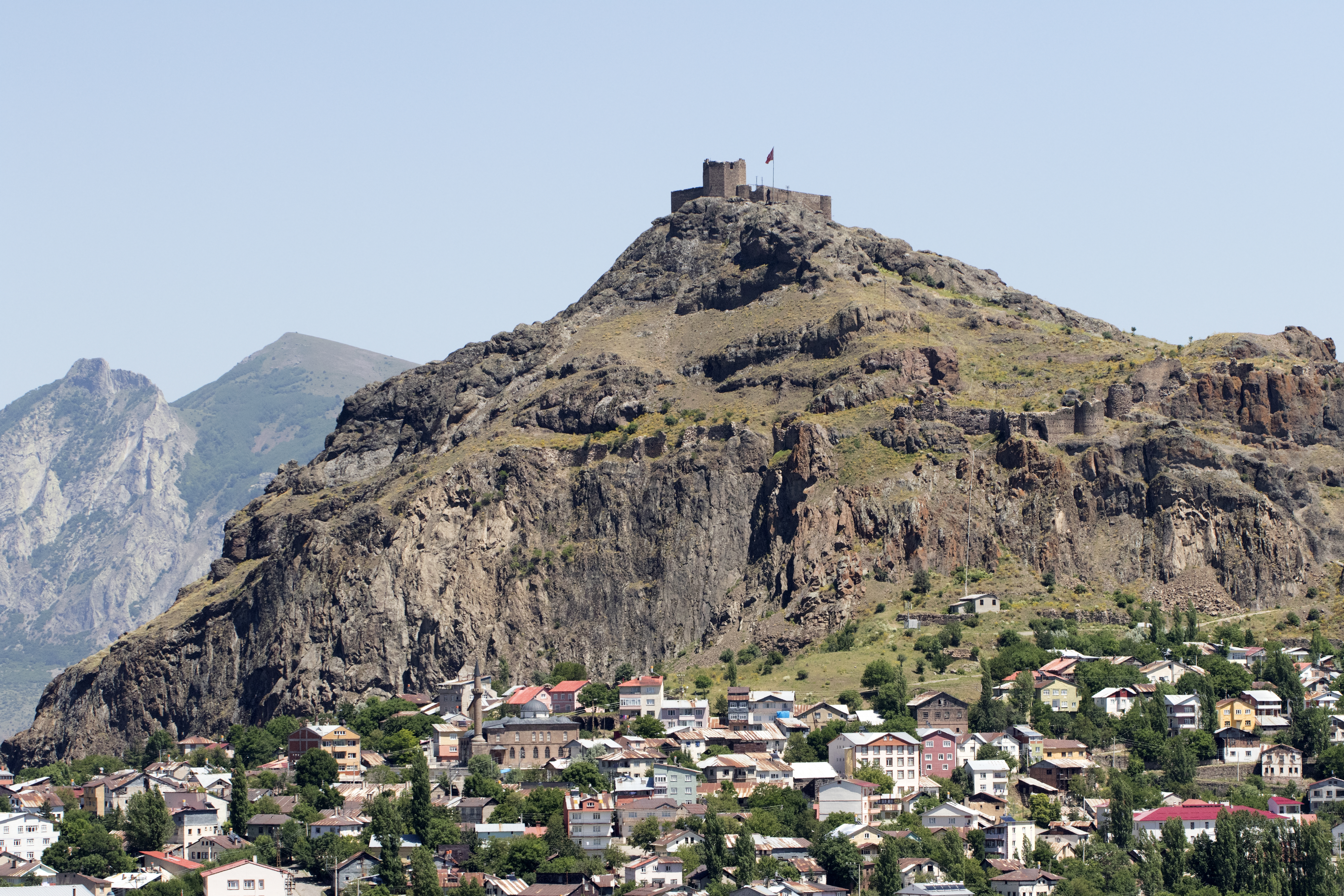
- Şebinkarahisar Castle seen from west.

Site information
- Type: Castle

Location
- Coordinates: 40.25998°N 38.49014°E

Şebinkarahisar Castle (Turkish: Şebinkarahisar Kalesi) is a fortification in Şebinkarahisar district of Giresun Province, northern Turkey.

Şebinkarahisar Castle is located atop of a 1,360 m (4,460 ft)-high hill named Hacikayası southeast of Şebinkarahisar town in Giresun Province, northern Turkey. It is assumed that the castle existed during the Kingdom of Pontus before the Roman Empire period. Some parts of the castle walls in the north and southeast show traces of extensive repairs carried out during the reign of Roman emperor Justinian I (r. 527–565). Most of the castle walls were built during the Anatolian beylik of Mengujekids. It is stated that Ruler Fahreddin Behram Shah (1162-1225) made important additions to the castle in 1184. An inscription from the Mengujekids period featuring a relief of double-headed eagle, originally situated over the castle gate, was removed in 1896 and stolen It was later found, and sent to the Governor of Sivas Province.

The castle consists of two intertwined parts, the outer castle and the inner castle. The pointed-arched castle entrance, called the Seljuk Gate, is accessed through a staircase, and is flanked by two semicircular towers. About 10–15 m (33–49 ft) northeast of it, there exists another entrance, known as from the Byzantium period, which was apparently walled up and closed later. The oval-shaped large bastion located to the northwest of the outer castle is referred to as "Kızlar Kalesi" (literally: The Girls Castle) in the sources. On the order of Behram Shah, his son Muzafferiddin Mehmed built an inner castle in an irregular rectangular plan on the highest part of the rock and an octagonal palace tower. Stonemasonry signs from the 13th century are found at the gate of the inner castle and on the walls of the palace tower structure.

The castle was destroyed during the suppresiion of the rebellions of Şehzade Murad in 1515, Abaza Mehmed Pasha in 1622 and Armenian Shabin-Karahisar uprising in 1915. It was restorated and repaired many times during the Ottoma era. The current walls and entrance of the castle belong to the Seljuk and Ottoman periods.

There are many large and small rock-carved cisterns inside the castle. The most important of these is the water tunnel called "Kırk Badal" (literally: Forty Steps). According to the travelogue Seyahatnâme of Evliya Çelebi (1611–1682), there were seventy houses inside the castle, many cisterns, wheat warehouses and the Küçük Fatih Mosque. It is stated that most of these structures were standing until the Armenian rebellion of 1915. There are traces of rock-carved graves in the eastern direction of the castle that might date back to pre-Turkic period.
