= 1939 Erzincan earthquake =

Earthquake in Turkey

- Location within Turkey
- UTC time: 1939-12-26 23:57:23
- ISC event: 902291
- USGS-ANSS: ComCat
- Local date: 27 December 1939
- Local time: 1:57:23 a.m.
- Magnitude: 7.8 M_{w}
- Depth: 20 km (12 mi)
- Epicenter: 39.77°N 39.58°E
- Fault: North Anatolian Fault
- Type: Strike-slip
- Areas affected: Erzincan Province; Turkey
- Total damage: 116,720 buildings were seriously damaged; US $20 million (estimated)
- Max. intensity: MMI XII (Extreme)
- Tsunami: 0.53 m (1 ft 9 in)
- Aftershocks: Yes
- Casualties: 32,700–32,968 dead 100,000 injured

An earthquake struck Turkey's eastern Erzincan Province at 1:57:23 a.m. on 27 December 1939 local time with a moment magnitude (M_{w}) of 7.8 and maximum Mercalli intensity of XII (Extreme). It is tied with the 2023 Turkey–Syria earthquakes as the most powerful earthquake in Turkey to be recorded by instruments. However, it was less powerful than estimates of the 1668 North Anatolia earthquake. This was one of the largest in a sequence of violent shocks to affect Turkey along the North Anatolian Fault between 1939 and 1999. Surface rupturing, with a horizontal displacement of up to 3.7 meters, occurred in a 360 km long segment of the North Anatolian Fault Zone. The earthquake was the most severe natural loss of life in Turkey in the 20th century, with 32,968 dead, and some 100,000 injured.

== Preface ==
The North Anatolian Fault in Asia Minor is a major transform fault boundary where the Eurasian plate slides past the smaller Anatolian Microplate. Running for over 1,600 km, the fault stretches from Eastern Turkey to the Sea of Marmara. The North Anatolian fault has been, and remains very active; this has led to Ezrican city center being called "one of the most hazardous regions in the world." Erzincan has been destroyed by earthquakes at least 11 times since 1,000 AD. Between 1942 and 1967, there were six major earthquakes along the same fault, with three above 7 M_{w}.

== Earthquake ==
With an epicenter near the city of Erzincan, the earthquake rupture propagated westwards for a length of 400 km. Surface ruptures are still visible to this day. Up to 360 km of surface rupture was formed. An average surface displacement of between 2.3 meters and 8.8 meters was calculated. Vertical displacements measured 0.5–2.0 meters. The maximum horizontal slip was 10.5 meters. The shaking lasted for 52 seconds. It resulted in a tsunami with heights of 1–3 m (3.3–9.8 ft) that hit the Black sea coast. Coulomb stress transfer from the 1939 earthquake promoted westward-progressing ruptures along the North Anatolian Fault. Ten earthquakes greater than magnitude 6.7 have ruptured a 1,000 km portion of the fault since 1939.

== Damage ==
The earthquake seriously damaged some 116,720 buildings. Occurring in winter, it was difficult for aid to reach the affected areas.

Initially, the death toll was about 8,000 people. The next day on 28 December, it was reported that it had risen to 20,000. During the same day, the temperature fell to −30 °C (−22 °F). An emergency rescue operation began. By January 5, almost 33,000 had died from the earthquake and low temperatures, blizzard conditions and floods.

== Aftermath ==
The total destruction of the earthquake prompted Turkey to adopt seismic building regulations. So extensive was the damage to the city of Erzincan that its old site was entirely abandoned and a new settlement was founded a little further to the north.

== See also ==
- List of earthquakes in 1939
- List of earthquakes in Turkey
- Osman Nuri Tekeli
