= Districts of Turkey =

Districts of Turkey Türkiye'nin ilçeleri (Turkish)
- Category: Unitary state
- Location: (Turkey) Turkish Republic
- Found in: Provinces
- Number: 973
- Populations: 1,678 (Yalıhüyük)-Konya Province – 988,369 (Esenyurt)-Istanbul Province
- Areas: 5.2 km^{2} (2 sq mi) (Güngören)-Istanbul Province – 4,314.00 km^{2} (1,665.645 sq mi) (Siverek)-Şanlıurfa Province
- Government: District government, National government
- Subdivisions: Köy

The 81 provinces of Turkey are divided into 922 districts (ilçeler; sing. ilçe). In the Ottoman Empire and in the early Turkish Republic, the corresponding unit was the kaza.

Most provinces bear the same name as their respective provincial capital districts. However, many urban provinces, designated as greater municipalities, have a center consisting of multiple districts, such as the provincial capital of Ankara province, The City of Ankara, comprising nine separate districts. Additionally three provinces, Kocaeli, Sakarya, and Hatay have their capital district named differently from their province, as İzmit, Adapazarı, and Antakya respectively.

A district may cover both rural and urban areas. In many provinces, one district of a province is designated the central district (merkez ilçe) from which the district is administered. The central district is administered by an appointed provincial deputy governor and other non-central districts by an appointed sub-governor (kaymakam) from their district center (ilçe merkezi) municipality. In these central districts the district center municipality also serves as the provincial center municipality. Both the deputy governor and sub-governors are responsible to the province governor (vali). Greater Municipalities, however, are administered differently where a separate seat of municipality exists for the entire province, having administrative power over all districts of the province.

== Local government ==
Municipalities (belediye) can be created in, and are subordinate to, the districts in which they are located. Each district has at least one municipality (belde) in the district center from which both the municipal government for that municipality and the district government is administered. A municipality is headed by an elected mayor (belediye başkanı) who administers the local government for defined municipal matters. More and more settlements which are outside district centers have municipalities as well, usually because their population requires one. A municipality's borders usually correspond to that of the urban settlement it covers, but may also include some undeveloped land.

Villages (köy) outside municipalities and quarters or neighborhoods (mahalle) within municipalities are the lowest level of local government, and are also the most numerous unit of local government in Turkey. They elect muhtars to care for specific administrative matters such as residence registration. The designation slightly differs (köy muhtarı for village muhtar, mahalle muhtarı for quarter muhtar) and the tasks, which are largely similar but are adapted to their locality.

Greater municipalities (büyükşehir belediyesi) exist for large cities like Istanbul and İzmir that consist of an extra administrative layer run by an elected head mayor, who oversee the municipalities and mayors within the province. Currently, 30 provinces are administered by greater municipalities in addition to having separate municipalities for every district within the province.

== List of districts with population ==
The districts and their populations (as of December 31, 2019) are listed below, by region and by province (with capital district in bold text).

=== Aegean region ===
==== Afyonkarahisar Province ====
(Mostly in the Aegean Region)

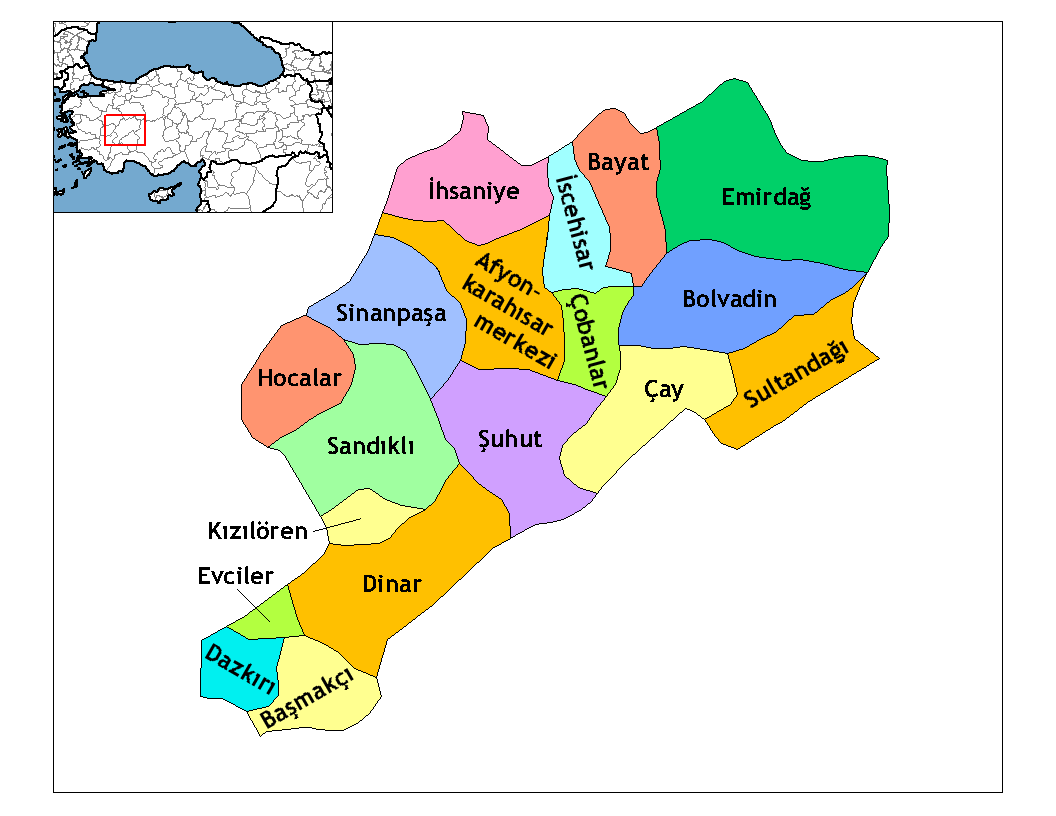
Districts of Afyonkarahisar

The following population data is based on the 2024 census. The list is sorted from highest to lowest population. According to the results of the local elections of March 31, 2024, mayors are listed with their parties.

Afyonkarahisar Province Population: 750,193

District	Population	Mayor	Party
Afyonkarahisar (Merkez)	328,319	Burcu Köksal	CHP
Sandıklı	54,952	Adnan Öztaş	AKP
Dinar	47,326	Veysel Topçu	CHP
Bolvadin	45,468	Derviş Aynacı	MHP
Emirdağ	43,484	Serkan Koyuncu	AKP
Sinanpaşa	38,428	Tolga Yıldırım	MHP
Şuhut	35,492	Muhittin Özaşkın	MHP
Çay	29,459	Yaşar Kemal Kantartopu	İYİ Party
İhsaniye	27,904	Emine Gökçe	AKP
İscehisar	25,084	Seyhan Kılınçarslan	AKP
Çobanlar	14,403	Ali Altuntaş	AKP
Sultandağı	13,779	Mehmet Aldırmaz	AKP
Dazkırı	11,670	Fatih Çiçek	AKP
Başmakçı	9,208	Selçuk Gönüllü	CHP
Hocalar	8,395	Ali Arslan	AKP
Bayat	7,725	Halilibrahim Bodur	AKP
Evciler	7,063	Berrin Uğurlu	CHP
Kızılören	2,034	Ali Erol	MHP

==== Aydın Province ====
(Entirely in the Aegean Region)

Districts of Aydın

The following population data is based on the 2024 census. The list is sorted from highest to lowest population. According to the results of the local elections of March 31, 2024, mayors are listed with their parties.

Aydın Province Population: 1,165,943

District	Population	Mayor	Party
Efeler	308,551	Anıl Yetişkin	CHP
Nazilli	162,041	Ertuğrul Tetik	CHP
Kuşadası	137,015	Ömer Günel	CHP
Söke	123,850	Mustafa İberya Arıkan	CHP
Didim	101,474	Hatice Gençay	CHP
İncirliova	57,483	Aytekin Kaya	AKP
Çine	48,209	Mehmet Kıvrak	CHP
Germencik	44,677	Burak Zencirci	CHP
Bozdoğan	31,945	Mustafa Galip Özel	CHP
Köşk	28,436	Nuri Güler	Independent
Kuyucak	26,684	Uğur Doğanca	CHP
Koçarlı	22,464	Özgür Arıcı	CHP
Sultanhisar	20,147	Osman Yıldırımkaya	Independent
Karacasu	17,508	Mustafa Büyükyapıcı	CHP
Buharkent	13,115	Mehmet Erol	AKP
Yenipazar	11,834	Malik Ercan	CHP
Karpuzlu	10,510	Hilmi Dönmez	AKP

==== Denizli Province ====
(Mostly in the Aegean Region)

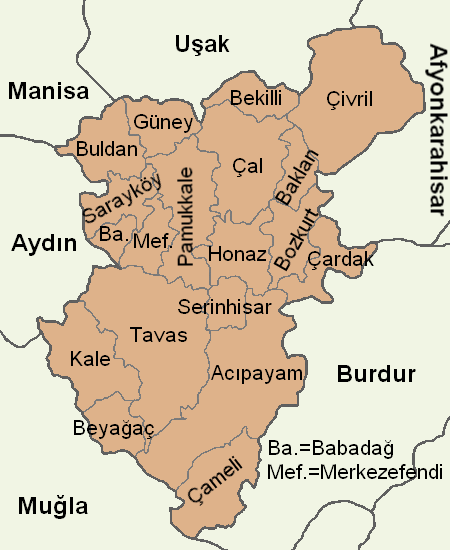
Districts of Denizli

The following population data is based on the 2024 census. The list is sorted from highest to lowest population. According to the results of the local elections of March 31, 2024, mayors are listed with their parties.

Denizli Province Population: 1,061,371

District	Population	Mayor	Party
Merkezefendi	345,933	Şeniz Doğan	CHP
Pamukkale	345,850	Ali Rıza Ertemür	CHP
Çivril	59,680	Semih Dere	CHP
Acıpayam	54,994	Levent Yıldırım	Y.Refah Party
Tavas	40,591	Kadir Tatık	CHP
Honaz	34,835	Yüksel Kepenek	CHP
Sarayköy	31,063	Mehmet Salih Konya	CHP
Buldan	26,456	Mehmet Ali Orpak	CHP
Kale	19,154	Erkan Hayla	CHP
Çal	17,546	Ahmet Hakan	CHP
Çameli	17,492	Cengiz Arslan	AKP
Serinhisar	14,591	Osman Kılıç	CHP
Bozkurt	11,130	Birsen Çelik	CHP
Güney	9,280	Mehmet Ali Eraydın	CHP
Çardak	8,558	Ali Altıner	CHP
Bekilli	6,416	Önder Demir	CHP
Babadağ	6,303	Murat Kumral	AKP
Beyağaç	6,148	Sezayi Pütün	Y.Refah Party
Baklan	5,351	Yusuf Gülsever	AKP

==== İzmir Province ====
(Entirely in the Aegean Region)

Districts of İzmir

The following population data is based on the 2024 census. The list is sorted from highest to lowest population. According to the results of the local elections of March 31, 2024, mayors are listed with their parties.

İzmir Province Population: 4,493,242

District	Population	Mayor	Party
Buca	523,193	Görkem Duman	CHP
Karabağlar	473,058	Emine Helil İnay Kınay	CHP
Bornova	448,737	Ömer Eşki	CHP
Karşıyaka	341,580	Behice Yıldız Ünsal	CHP
Konak	322,393	Nilüfer Çınarlı Mutlu	CHP
Bayraklı	299,859	İrfan Önal	CHP
Torbalı	218,744	Övünç Demir	CHP
Çiğli	215,697	Onur Emrah Yıldız	CHP
Menemen	214,409	Aydın Pehlivan	AKP
Gaziemir	136,930	Ünal Işık	CHP
Ödemiş	132,942	Mustafa Turan	CHP
Kemalpaşa	120,375	Mehmet Türkmen	CHP
Menderes	111,453	İlkay Çiçek	CHP
Aliağa	108,701	Serkan Acar	MHP
Bergama	107,347	Tanju Çelik	CHP
Tire	87,858	Hayati Okuroğlu	CHP
Urla	79,610	Selçuk Balkan	CHP
Balçova	76,613	Onur Yiğit	CHP
Narlıdere	61,732	Erman Uzun	CHP
Seferihisar	60,914	İsmail Yetişkin	CHP
Çeşme	50,828	Lal Denizli	CHP
Dikili	48,647	Adil Kırgöz	Independent
Kiraz	43,401	Nasuh Coşkun	CHP
Bayındır	40,054	Davut Sakarsu	CHP
Selçuk	38,688	Filiz Ceritoğlu Sengel	CHP
Güzelbahçe	38,500	Mustafa Günay	CHP
Foça	36,688	Saniye Fıçı	CHP
Kınık	28,859	Sema Bodur	CHP
Karaburun	13,473	İlkay Girgin Erdoğan	CHP
Beydağ	11,959	Şakir Başaran	CHP

==== Kütahya Province ====
(Mostly in the Aegean Region)

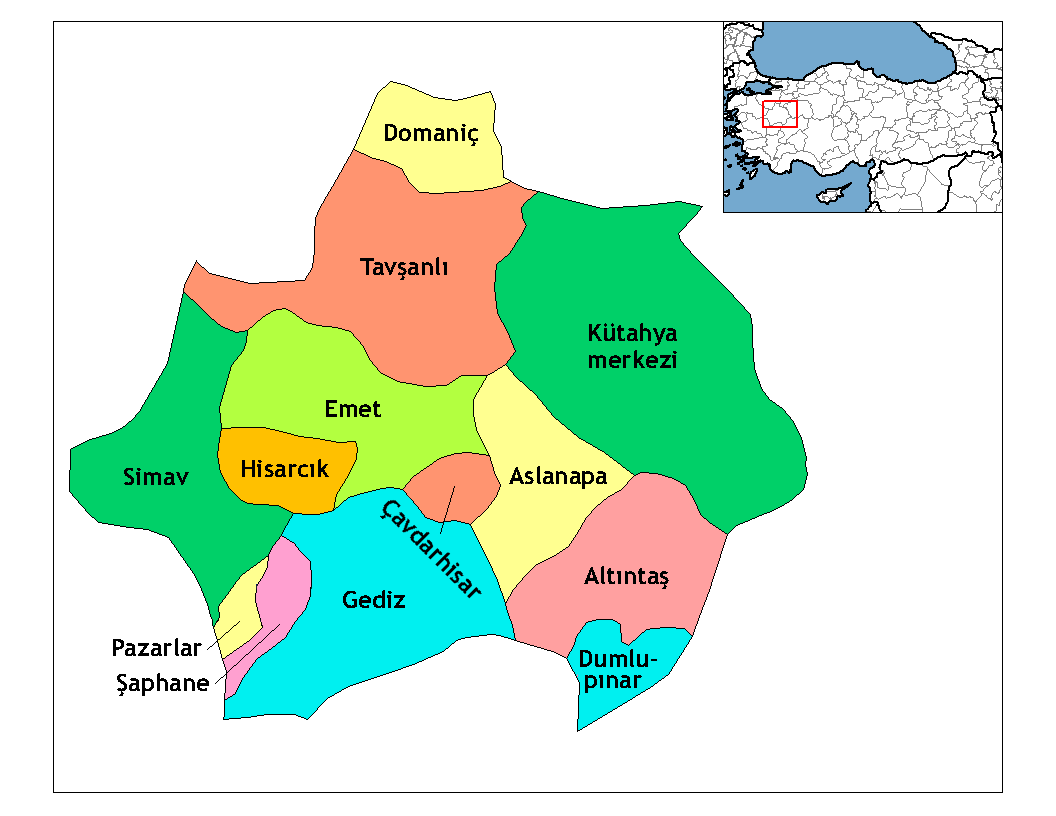
Districts of Kütahya

The following population data is based on the 2024 census. The list is sorted from highest to lowest population. According to the results of the local elections of March 31, 2024, mayors are listed with their parties.

Kütahya Province Population: 571,078

District	Population	Mayor	Party
Kütahya (Merkez)	275,111	Eyüp Kahveci	CHP
Tavşanlı	101,130	Ali Kemal Derin	Y.Refah Party
Simav	60,866	Kübra Tekel Aktulun	MHP
Gediz	49,240	Necdet Akel	MHP
Emet	17,811	Mustafa Koca	MHP
Altıntaş	14,985	Hikmet Tunç	MHP
Domaniç	13,941	Engin Uysal	CHP
Hisarcık	10,840	Mustafa Demirtaş	MHP
Aslanapa	8,082	Necati Kulik	AKP
Çavdarhisar	5,752	Halil İbrahim Topbaş	MHP
Şaphane	5,701	Lütfi Mutlu	CHP
Pazarlar	4,816	Bilal Demirci	AKP
Dumlupınar	2,803	Zekeriya Yılmaz	CHP

==== Manisa Province ====
(Entirely in the Aegean Region)

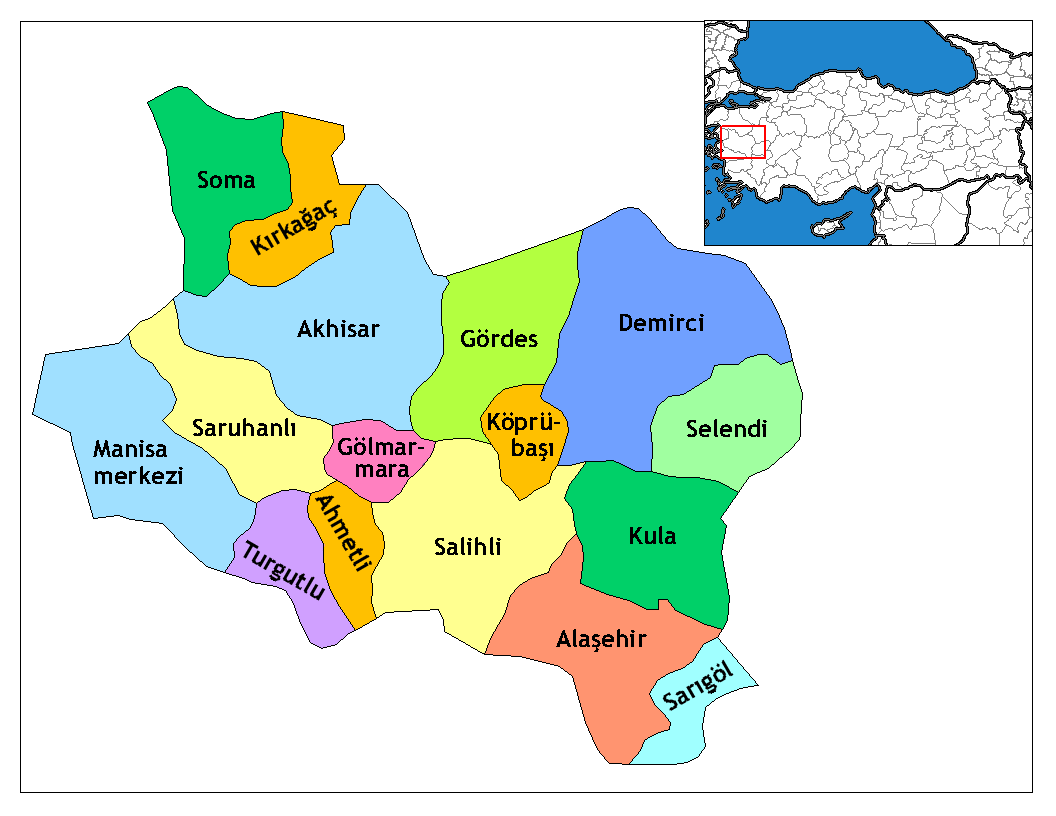
Districts of Manisa

The following population data is based on the 2024 census. The list is sorted from highest to lowest population. According to the results of the local elections of March 31, 2024, mayors are listed with their parties.

Manisa Province Population: 1,475,353

District	Population	Mayor	Party
Yunusemre	269,160	Ferdi Zeyrek	CHP
Akhisar	180,509	Besim Dutlulu	CHP
Turgutlu	178,386	Çetin Akın	CHP
Şehzadeler	166,228	Gülşah Durbay	CHP
Salihli	165,353	Mazlum Nurlu	CHP
Soma	110,996	Sercan Okur	CHP
Alaşehir	105,776	Ahmet Öküzcüoğlu	CHP
Saruhanlı	57,935	Ekrem Cıllı	AKP
Kula	42,952	Hikmet Dönmez	CHP
Kırkağaç	37,718	Üstün Dönmez	CHP
Demirci	35,604	Erkan Kara	AKP
Sarıgöl	35,125	Tahsin Akdeniz	CHP
Gördes	25,759	İbrahim Büke	CHP
Selendi	18,869	Murat Daban	Y.Refah Party
Ahmetli	17,403	Fuat Mintaş	CHP
Gölmarmara	15,176	Cem Aykan	CHP
Köprübaşı	12,404	Fatih Taşlı	CHP

==== Muğla Province ====
(Mostly in the Aegean Region)

Districts of Muğla

The following population data is based on the 2024 census. The list is sorted from highest to lowest population. According to the results of the local elections of March 31, 2024, mayors are listed with their parties.

Muğla Province Population: 1,081,867

District	Population	Mayor	Party
Bodrum	203,035	Tamer Mandalinci	CHP
Fethiye	182,280	Alim Karaca	CHP
Milas	150,520	Fevzi Topuz	CHP
Menteşe	124,825	Gonca Köksal	CHP
Marmaris	96,589	Acar Ünlü	CHP
Seydikemer	65,861	Bayram Önder Akdenizli	AKP
Ortaca	57,155	Evren Tezcan	CHP
Dalaman	51,088	Sezer Durmuş	CHP
Yatağan	45,217	Mesut Günay	CHP
Köyceğiz	41,205	Ali Erdoğan	CHP
Ula	27,392	Mehmet Caner	CHP
Datça	25,866	Aytaç Kurt	CHP
Kavaklıdere	10,834	Mehmet Demir	AKP

==== Uşak Province ====
(Entirely in the Aegean Region)

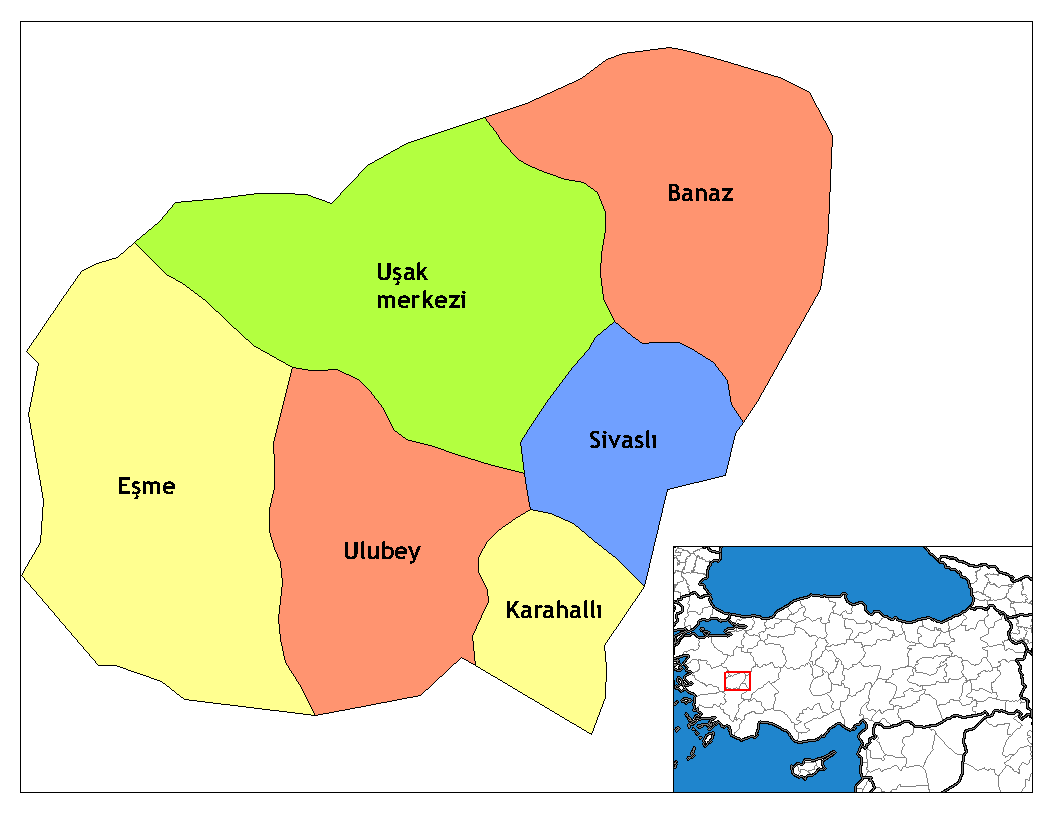
Districts of Uşak

The following population data is based on the 2024 census. The list is sorted from highest to lowest population. According to the results of the local elections of March 31, 2024, mayors are listed with their parties.

Uşak Province Population: 375,310

District	Population	Mayor	Party
Uşak (Merkez)	265,063	Özkan Yalım	CHP
Banaz	34,897	Zafer Arpacı	Independent
Eşme	34,596	Yılmaz Tozan	CHP
Sivaslı	19,481	Bahri Azatçam	AKP
Ulubey	11,650	Veli Koçlu	AKP
Karahallı	9,623	Ramazan Karakaya	CHP

=== Central Anatolia region ===
==== Aksaray Province ====
(Entirely in the Central Anatolia region)

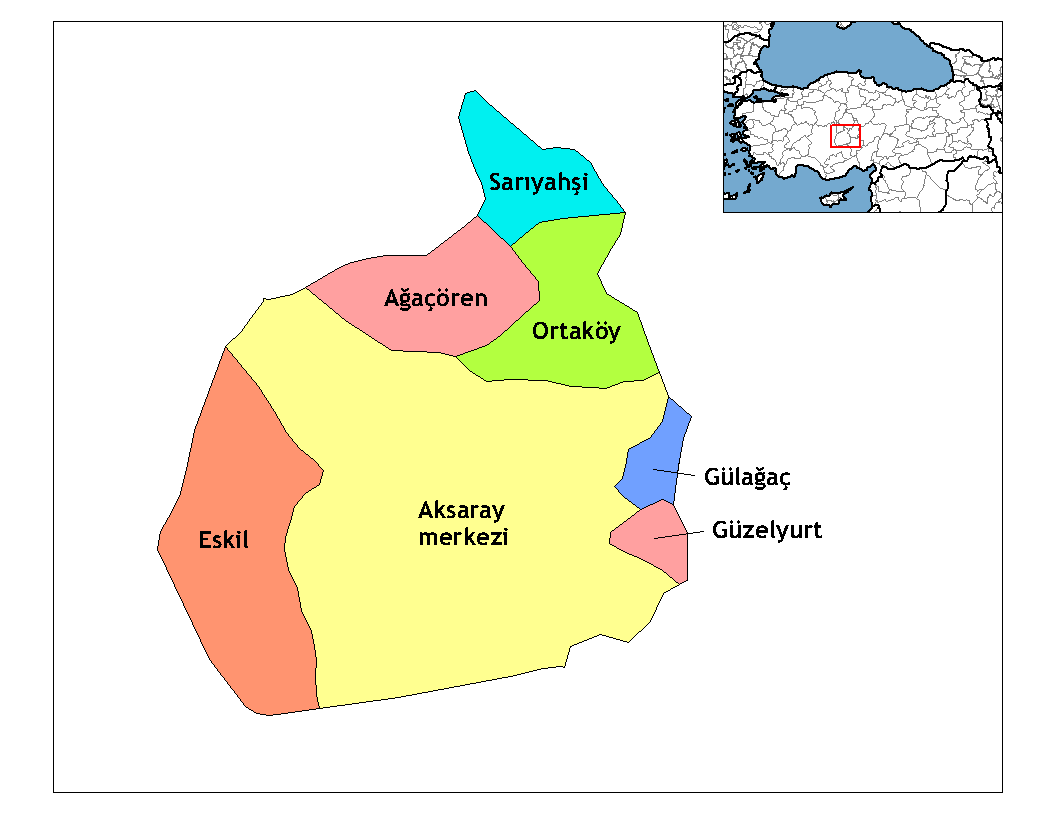
Districts of Aksaray

The following population data is based on the 2024 census. The list is sorted from highest to lowest population. According to the results of the local elections of March 31, 2024, mayors are listed with their parties.

Aksaray Province Population: 439,474

District	Population	Mayor	Party
Aksaray (Merkez)	324,816	Evren Dinçer	AKP
Ortaköy	31,287	Ahmet Koyuncu	MHP
Eskil	27,822	Mustafa Zavlak	AKP
Gülağaç	19,382	Doğan Başbuğ	MHP
Sultanhanı	12,749	Fahri Solak	AKP
Güzelyurt	10,782	Hazim Turan	AKP
Ağaçören	7,628	Kemal Salman	AKP
Sarıyahşi	5,008	Doğan Mutlu	MHP

==== Ankara Province ====
(Mostly in the Central Anatolia region)

Districts of Ankara

The following population data is based on the 2024 census. The list is sorted from highest to lowest population. According to the results of the local elections of March 31, 2024, mayors are listed with their parties.

Ankara Province Population: 5,864,049

District	Population	Mayor	Party
Çankaya	947,330	Hüseyin Can Güner	CHP
Keçiören	932,128	Mesut Özarslan	CHP
Yenimahalle	714,866	Fethi Yaşar	CHP
Mamak	686,777	Veli Gündüz Şahin	CHP
Etimesgut	629,112	Erdal Beşikcioğlu	CHP
Sincan	590,309	Murat Ercan	AKP
Altındağ	414,893	Veysel Tiryaki	AKP
Pursaklar	165,665	Ertuğrul Çetin	AKP
Gölbaşı	165,201	Yakup Odabaşı	CHP
Polatlı	130,515	Mürsel Yıldızkaya	CHP
Çubuk	100,750	Baki Demirbaş	AKP
Kahramankazan	62,060	Selim Çırpanoğlu	CHP
Beypazarı	48,445	Özer Kasap	CHP
Elmadağ	45,133	Adem Barış Aşkın	CHP
Akyurt	44,541	Hilal Ayık	AKP
Şereflikoçhisar	33,316	Mustafa Koçak	CHP
Kızılcahamam	28,823	Süleyman Acar	AKP
Haymana	27,241	Levent Koç	CHP
Nallıhan	26,488	Ertunç Güngör	CHP
Bala	21,893	Ahmet Buran	AKP
Ayaş	13,670	İzzet Demircioğlu	CHP
Kalecik	12,801	Satılmış Karakoç	CHP
Çamlıdere	10,475	Adem Ceylan	Independent
Güdül	8,521	Mehmet Doğanay	CHP
Evren	3,096	Hüsamettin Ünsal	AKP

==== Çankırı Province ====
(Mostly in the Central Anatolia region)

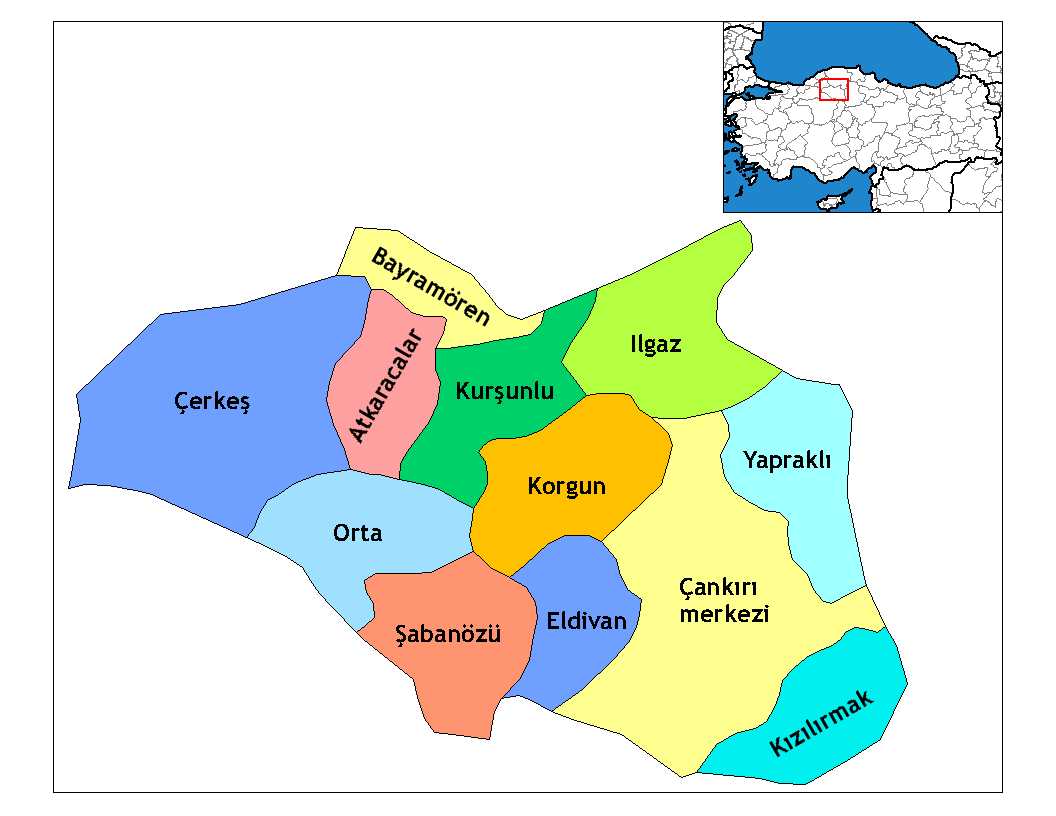
Districts of Çankırı

The following population data is based on the 2024 census. The list is sorted from highest to lowest population. According to the results of the local elections of March 31, 2024, mayors are listed with their parties.

Çankırı Province Population: 199,981

District	Population	Mayor	Party
Çankırı (Merkez)	98,972	İsmail Hakkı Esen	MHP
Çerkeş	17,249	Hasan Sopacı	AK Party
Orta	14,709	Ömer Bezci	MHP
Ilgaz	13,996	Mehmed Öztürk	AK Party
Şabanözü	12,651	Faik Özcan	AK Party
Kurşunlu	9,637	Şerafettin Uslu	MHP
Yapraklı	7,436	Ömer Güngör	MHP
Kızılırmak	7,098	Erol Şentürk	MHP
Eldivan	6,392	Mustafa Lafcı	AK Party
Atkaracalar	5,126	Harun Oflaz	AK Party
Korgun	4,353	Hasan Hüseyin Kozan	MHP
Bayramören	2,362	Raşit Güngör	AK Party

==== Eskişehir Province ====
(Mostly in the Central Anatolia region)

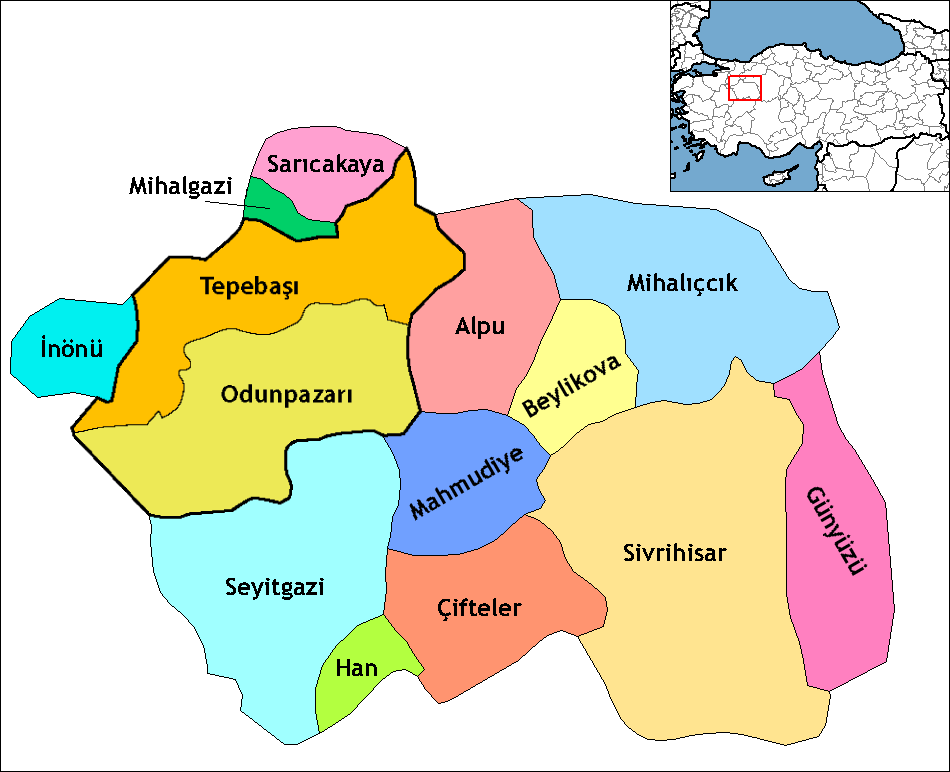
Districts of Eskişehir

The following population data is based on the 2024 census. The list is sorted from highest to lowest population. According to the results of the local elections of March 31, 2024, mayors are listed with their parties.

Eskişehir Province Population: 921,630

District	Population	Mayor	Party
Odunpazarı	426,581	Kazım Kurt	CHP
Tepebaşı	394,734	Ahmet Ataç	CHP
Sivrihisar	20,258	Habil Dökmeci	CHP
Çifteler	14,814	Zehra Konakcı	CHP
Seyitgazi	12,878	Uğur Tepe	CHP
Alpu	10,072	Gürbüz Güller	CHP
Mihalıççık	7,959	Haydar Çorum	DSP
Mahmudiye	7,524	İshak Gündoğan	CHP
İnönü	6,194	Serhat Hamamcı	AK Party
Beylikova	5,723	Hakan Karabacak	CHP
Günyüzü	5,261	Hidayet Özmen	BBP
Sarıcakaya	4,534	Ahmet Dönmez	AK Party
Mihalgazi	2,934	Zeynep Güneş	AK Party
Han	2,164	Bekir Belceli	AK Party

===== Karaman Province =====
(Mostly in the Central Anatolia region)

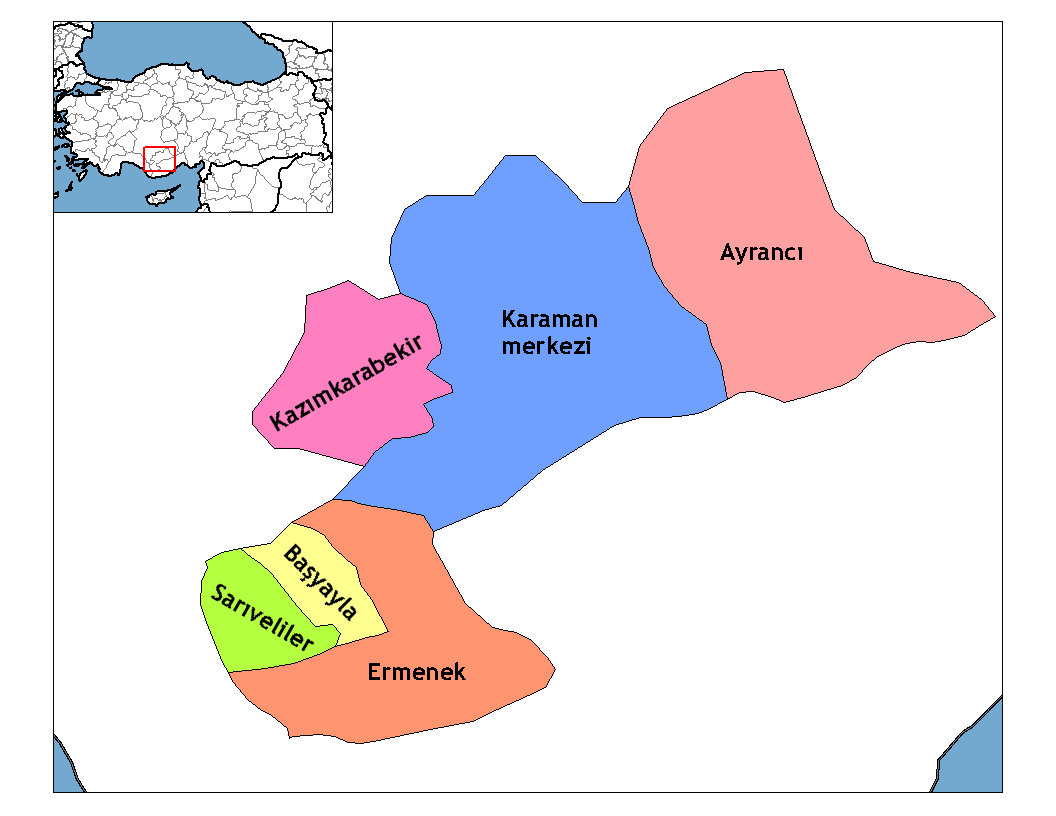
Districts of Karaman

The following population data is based on the 2024 census. The list is sorted from highest to lowest population. According to the results of the local elections of March 31, 2024, mayors are listed with their parties.

Karaman Province Population: 262,791

District	Population	Mayor	Party
Karaman (Merkez)	207,686	Savaş Kalaycı	MHP
Ermenek	27,988	Mustafa Bozcu	CHP
Sarıveliler	11,800	Mehmet Ali Yılmaz	AK Party
Ayrancı	7,342	Yüksel Büyükkarcı	MHP
Kazımkarabekir	4,683	Durmuş Demir	AK Party
Başyayla	3,292	Abdülkadir Ateş	AK Party

==== Kayseri Province ====
(Mostly in the Central Anatolia region)

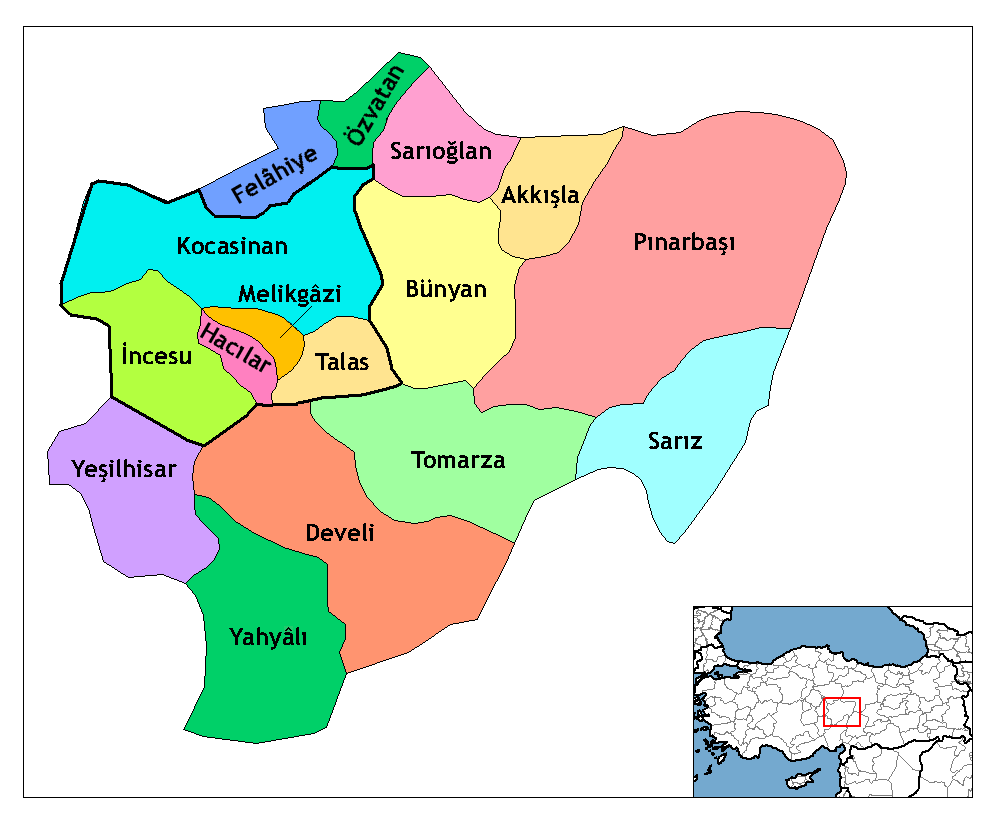
Districts of Kayseri

The following population data is based on the 2024 census. The list is sorted from highest to lowest population. According to the results of the local elections of March 31, 2024, mayors are listed with their parties.

Kayseri Province Population: 1,452,458

District	Population	Mayor	Party
Melikgazi	589,989	Hacı Mustafa Palancıoğlu	AK Party
Kocasinan	416,124	Ahmet Çolakbayrakdar	AK Party
Talas	171,689	Mustafa Yalçın	AK Party
Develi	67,676	Adem Şengül	AK P arty
Yahyalı	35,588	Esat Öztürk	AK Party
Bünyan	30,486	Selahattin Metin	MHP
İncesu	30,181	Mustafa İlmek	AK Party
Pınarbaşı	21,567	Deniz Yağan	CHP
Tomarza	20,832	Osman Koç	İYİ Party
Yeşilhisar	15,674	Halit Taşyapan	AK Party
Sarıoğlan	13,943	Bekir Ayyıldırım	MHP
Hacılar	13,270	Bilal Özdoğan	AK Party
Sarız	9,853	Ömer Faruk Eroğlu	CHP
Felahiye	5,781	Şeref Güleser	CHP
Akkışla	5,738	Mustafa Dursun	CHP
Özvatan	4,067	Halit Demir	MHP

==== Kırıkkale Province ====
(Entirely in the Central Anatolia region)

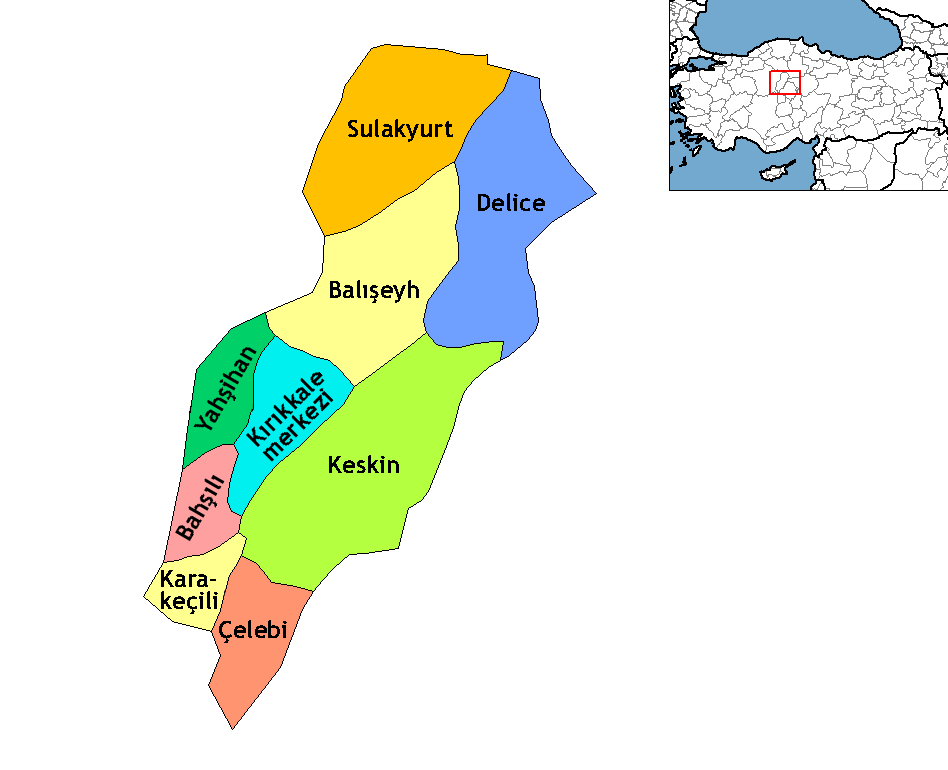
Districts of Kırıkkale

The following population data is based on the 2024 census. The list is sorted from highest to lowest population. According to the results of the local elections of March 31, 2024, mayors are listed with their parties.

Kırıkkale Province Population: 283,053

District	Population	Mayor	Party
Kırıkkale (Merkez)	192,558	Ahmet Önal	CHP
Yahşihan	38,530	Ahmet Sungur	AK Party
Keskin	16,265	Ekmel Cönger	AK Party
Delice	10,200	Yılmaz Uyan	AK Party
Bahşılı	7,423	Halil İbrahim Bişkin	MHP
Sulakyurt	6,145	Seyfettin Çetiner	AK Party
Balışeyh	6,060	Hilmi Şen	Y.Refah Party
Karakeçili	3,124	Hüseyin Özçelik	AK Party
Çelebi	2,748	Yaşar Erdemir	AK Party

==== Kırşehir Province ====
(Entirely in the Central Anatolia region)

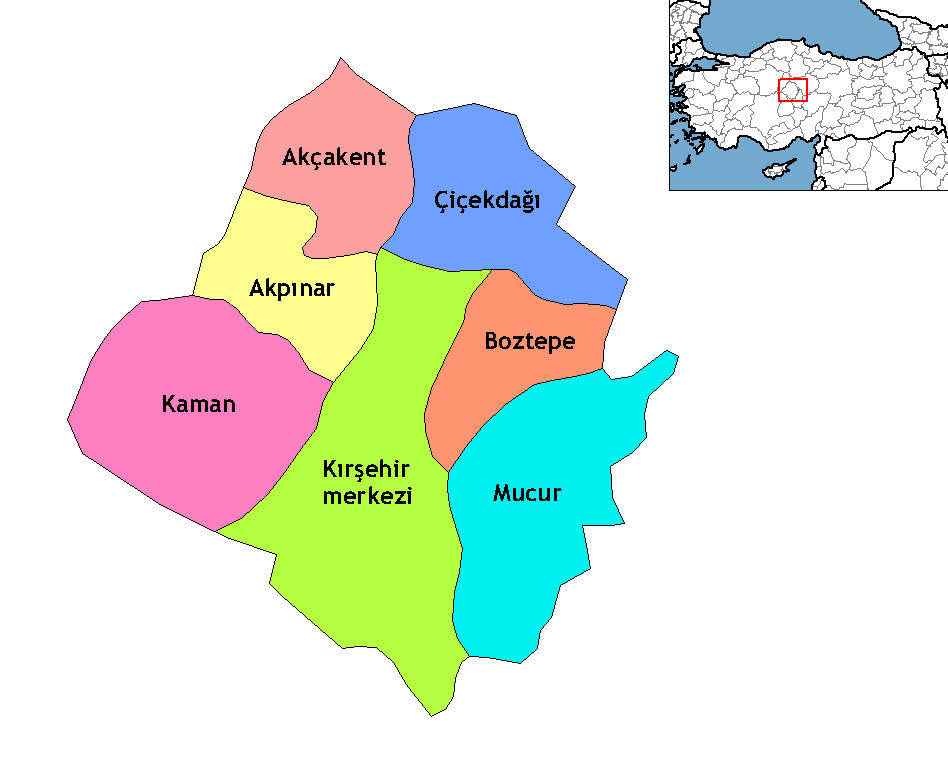
Districts of Kırşehir

The following population data is based on the 2024 census. The list is sorted from highest to lowest population. According to the results of the local elections of March 31, 2024, mayors are listed with their parties.

Kırşehir Province Population: 244,546

District	Population	Mayor	Party
Kırşehir (Merkez)	163,349	Selahattin Ekicioğlu	CHP
Kaman	33,469	Emre Demirci	AK Party
Mucur	18,235	Ali Şahin	BBP
Çiçekdağı	13,908	Hasan Hakanoğlu	AK Party
Akpınar	6,918	Şükrü Turgut	CHP
Boztepe	5,229	Musa Ceylan	MHP
Akçakent	3,438	Yılmaz Kılıç	AK Party

==== Konya Province ====
(Mostly in the Central Anatolia region)

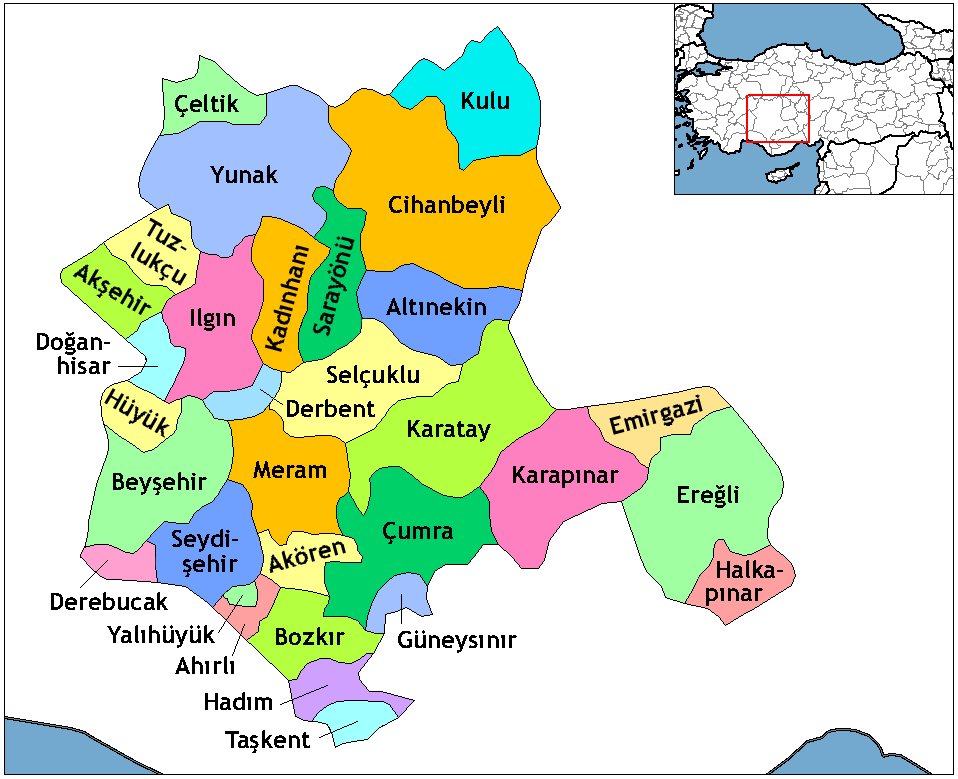
Districts of Konya

The following population data is based on the 2024 census. The list is sorted from highest to lowest population. According to the results of the local elections of March 31, 2024, mayors are listed with their parties.

Konya Province Population: 2,330,024

District	Population	Mayor	Party
Selçuklu	700,358	Ahmet Pekyatırmacı	AK Party
Karatay	385,432	Hasan Kılca	AK Party
Meram	348,071	Mustafa Kavuş	AK Party
Ereğli	156,253	Ümit Akpınar	CHP
Akşehir	93,719	Ahmet Nuri Köksal	CHP
Beyşehir	79,629	Adil Bayındır	AK Party
Çumra	68,551	Mehmet Aydın	Y.Refah Party
Seydişehir	66,067	Hasan Ustaoğlu	DP (Democrat Party)
Ilgın	53,239	Ömer Apil	Y.Refah Party
Kulu	51,794	Abdurrahim Sertdemir	AK Party
Karapınar	51,324	İbrahim Önal	Y.Refah Party
Cihanbeyli	50,021	Fırat Kızılkaya	CHP
Kadınhanı	31,494	İrfan Karaca	Y.Refah Party
Sarayönü	28,533	Necati Koç	Y.Refah Party
Bozkır	25,199	Nazif Karabulut	BBP (Great Unity Party)
Yunak	20,646	Subhan Günaltay	BBP (Great Unity Party)
Hüyük	15,033	Sadık Sefer	Independent
Altınekin	14,593	Fatih Orhan	Y.Refah Party
Doğanhisar	14,445	Ali Öztoklu	Y.Refah Party
Hadim	11,049	Mehmet Çetiner	AK Party
Çeltik	9,726	Ali Meşe	AK Party
Güneysınır	9,287	Ahmet Demir	AK Party
Emirgazi	7,739	Mesut Mertcan	Y.Refah Party
Tuzlukçu	6,127	Nurettin Akbuğa	CHP
Taşkent	5,931	Mehmet Acar	BBP (Great Unity Party)
Akören	5,857	İsmail Arslan	Y.Refah Party
Derebucak	5,540	Ahmet Kısa	Independent
Ahırlı	4,666	Ali Üzlük	İYİ Party
Derbent	4,014	Hüseyin Ayten	Independent
Halkapınar	4,009	Mehmet Vardar	BBP (Great Unity Party)
Yalıhüyük	1,678	Mehmet Ali Yılmaz	Y.Refah Party

==== Nevşehir Province ====
(Entirely in the Central Anatolia region)

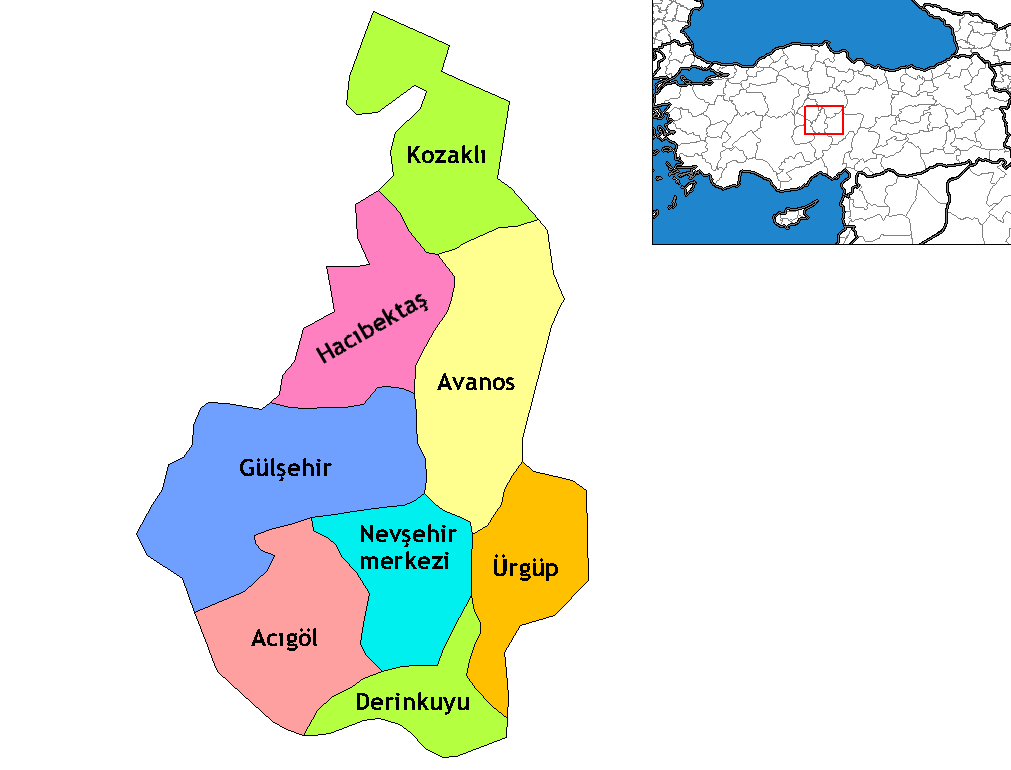
Districts of Nevşehir

The following population data is based on the 2024 census. The list is sorted from highest to lowest population. According to the results of the local elections of March 31, 2024, mayors are listed with their parties.

Nevşehir Province Population: 317,952

District	Population	Mayor	Party
Nevşehir (Merkez)	161,293	Rasim Arı	İYİ Party
Ürgüp	39,055	Ali Ertuğrul Bul	CHP
Avanos	32,098	Mustafa Kenan Sarıtaş	MHP
Gülşehir	21,378	Erkan Çiftci	MHP
Derinkuyu	20,971	Taner İnce	CHP
Acıgöl	19,365	Mehmet Eroğlu	MHP
Kozaklı	12,906	Sefer Neslihanoğlu	CHP
Hacıbektaş	10,886	Ali Avcı	Independent

==== Niğde Province ====
(Entirely in the Central Anatolia region)

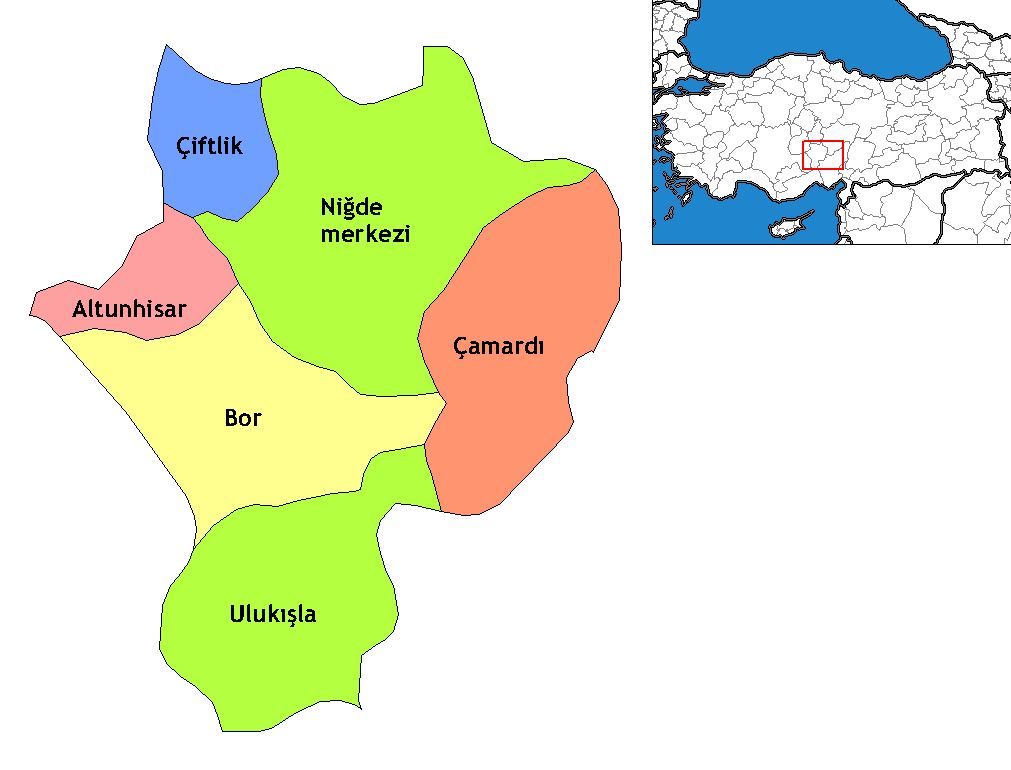
Districts of Niğde

The following population data is based on the 2024 census. The list is sorted from highest to lowest population. According to the results of the local elections of March 31, 2024, mayors are listed with their parties.

Niğde Province Population: 372,708

District	Population	Mayor	Party
Niğde (Merkez)	240,283	Emrah Özdemir	AK Party
Bor	62,346	Serkan Baran	AK Party
Çiftlik	25,977	Arif Çakıl	CHP
Ulukışla	19,534	Ali Uğurlu	AK Party
Altunhisar	12,593	Neşet Doygun	AK Party
Çamardı	11,975	Ali Pınar	AK Party

==== Sivas Province ====
(Mostly in the Central Anatolia region)

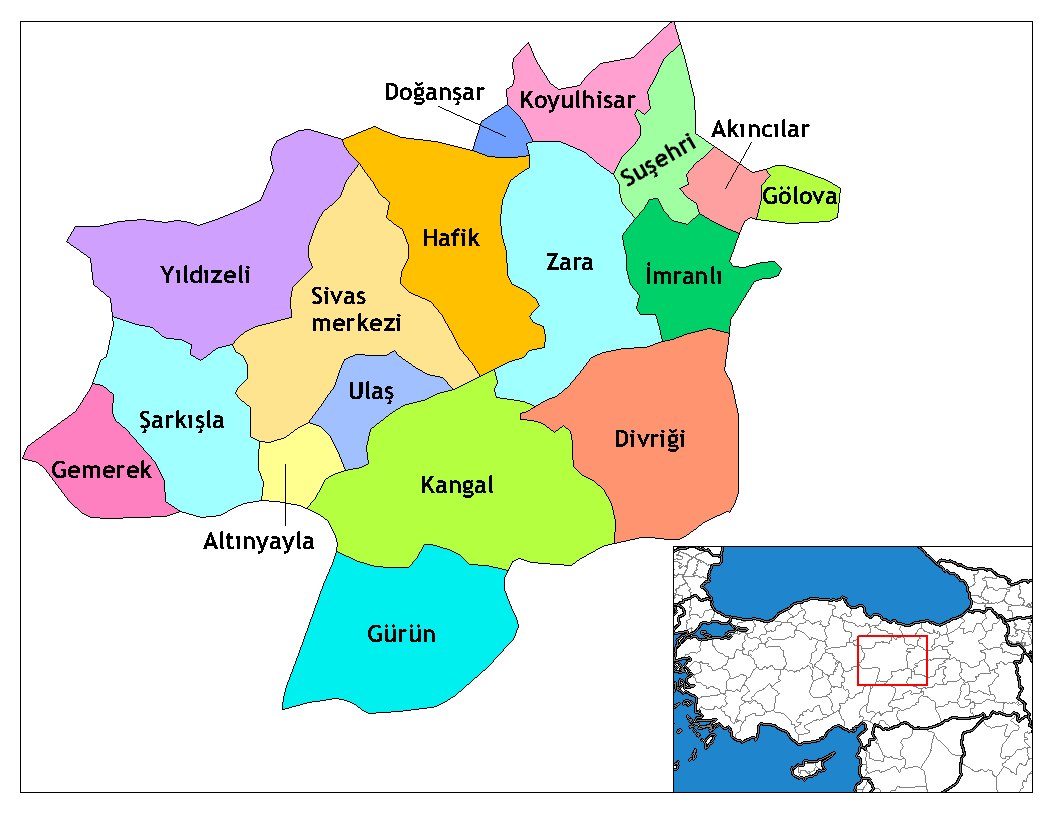
Districts of Sivas

The following population data is based on the 2024 census. The list is sorted from highest to lowest population. According to the results of the local elections of March 31, 2024, mayors are listed with their parties.

Sivas Province Population: 637,007

District	Population	Mayor	Party
Sivas (Merkez)	392,711	Adem Uzun	BBP
Şarkışla	37,340	Kasım Gültekin	BBP
Yıldızeli	28,382	Yaşar Göktaş	MHP
Suşehri	24,938	Ahmet Ayhan Kayaoğlu	MHP
Zara	21,951	Fatih Çelik	MHP
Gemerek	21,525	Sezai Çelikten	Y.Refah Party
Kangal	20,176	Mehmet Öztürk	AK Party
Gürün	17,486	Nami Çiftçi	MHP
Divriği	16,204	Cihan Deniz Akbaş	CHP
Koyulhisar	12,212	Bora Karakullukcu	İYİ Party
Hafik	9,448	Habip Görler	AK Party
Altınyayla	8,453	Sezai Subaşı	MHP
Ulaş	8,029	Turan İlbey	MHP
İmranlı	7,438	Ali Ürek	AKP
Akıncılar	4,766	Murat Sevinç	MHP
Gölova	3,215	Tevfik Ayan	AK Party
Doğanşar	2,733	Hasan Hüseyin Karataş	AK Party

==== Yozgat Province ====
(Entirely in the Central Anatolia region)

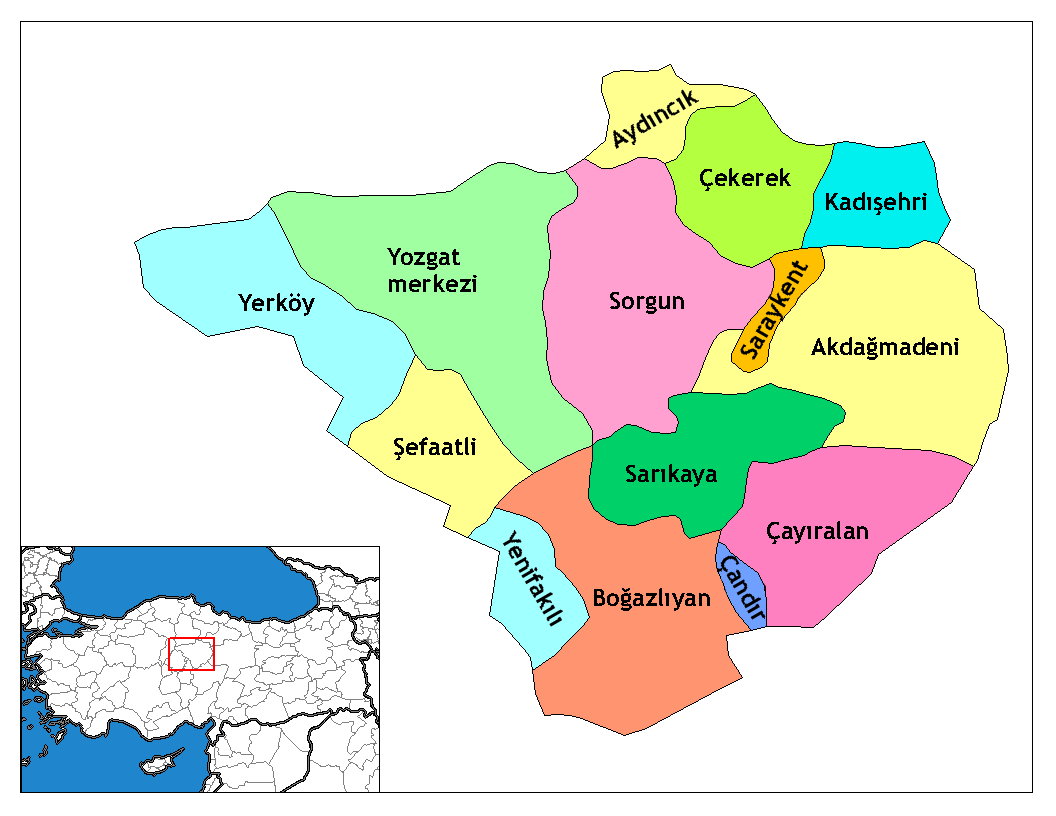
Districts of Yozgat

The following population data is based on the 2024 census. The list is sorted from highest to lowest population. According to the results of the local elections of March 31, 2024, mayors are listed with their parties.

Yozgat Province Population: 413,161

District	Population	Mayor	Party
Yozgat (Merkez)	109,305	Kazım Arslan	Y.Refah
Sorgun	80,095	Mustafa Erkut Ekinci	MHP
Akdağmadeni	39,758	Nezih Yalçın	MHP
Boğazlıyan	34,670	Gökhan Coşar	AKP
Yerköy	33,069	Fatih Arslan	AKP
Sarıkaya	31,000	Osman Gözan	AKP
Çekerek	18,401	Üzeyir İnce	MHP
Şefaatli	14,184	Zeki Bozkurt	AKP
Çayıralan	12,054	Ahmet Kaygısız	MHP
Saraykent	11,369	Ahmet Köroğlu	MHP
Kadışehri	10,080	Davut Karadavut	Y.Refah
Aydıncık	9,696	Mustafa Tekçam	AKP
Yenifakılı	5,095	Musa Sarıaslan	MHP
Çandır	4,385	Ertan Eroğlu	MHP

=== Eastern Anatolia region ===
==== Ağrı Province ====
(Entirely in the Eastern Anatolia Region)

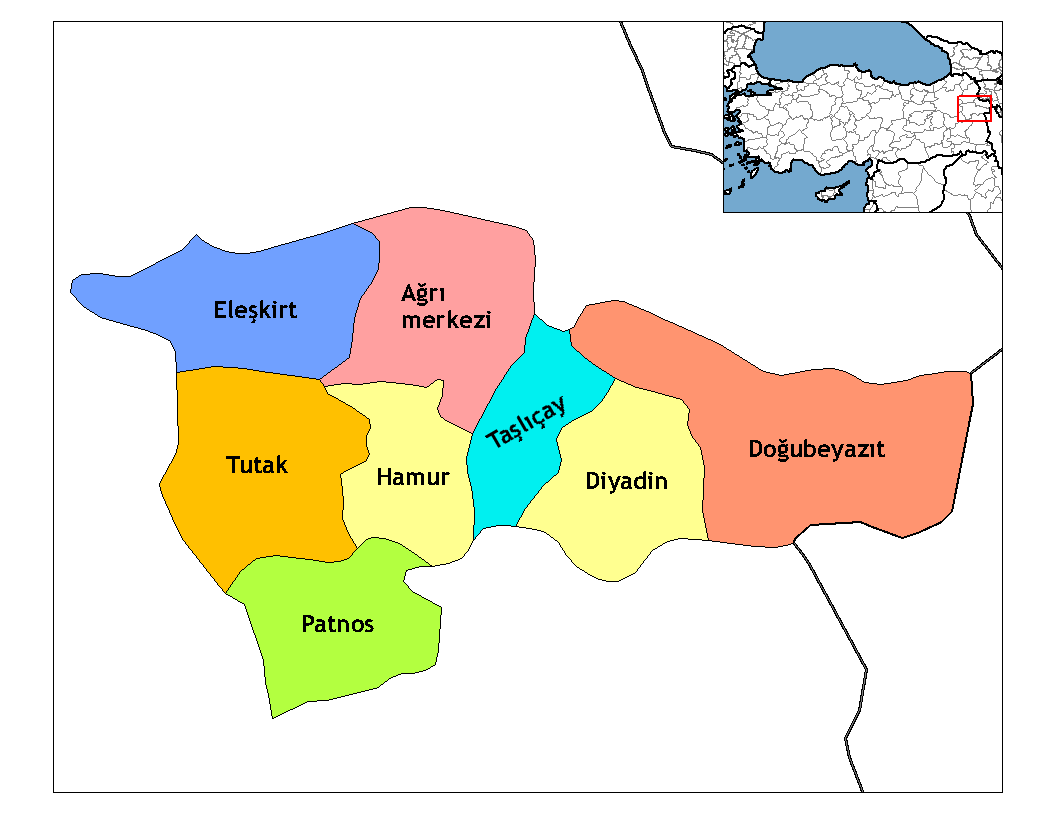
Districts of Ağrı

The following population data is based on the 2024 census. The list is sorted from highest to lowest population. According to the results of the local elections of March 31, 2024, mayors are listed with their parties.

Ağrı Province Population: 499,801

District	Population	Mayor	Party
Ağrı (Merkez)	150,602	Hazal Aras	DEM Party
Doğubayazıt	114,769	Kenan Alkan	DEM Party
Patnos	109,224	Abdulhalık Taşkın	AK Party
Diyadin	36,416	Adnan Doğan	DEM Party
Eleşkirt	28,901	Ramazan Yakut	AK Party
Tutak	26,776	Fevzi Sayan	AK Party
Taşlıçay	18,152	Mehmetali Budak	DEM Party
Hamur	14,961	İsmet Aslan	Y.Reffah Party

==== Ardahan Province ====
(Mostly in the Eastern Anatolia Region)

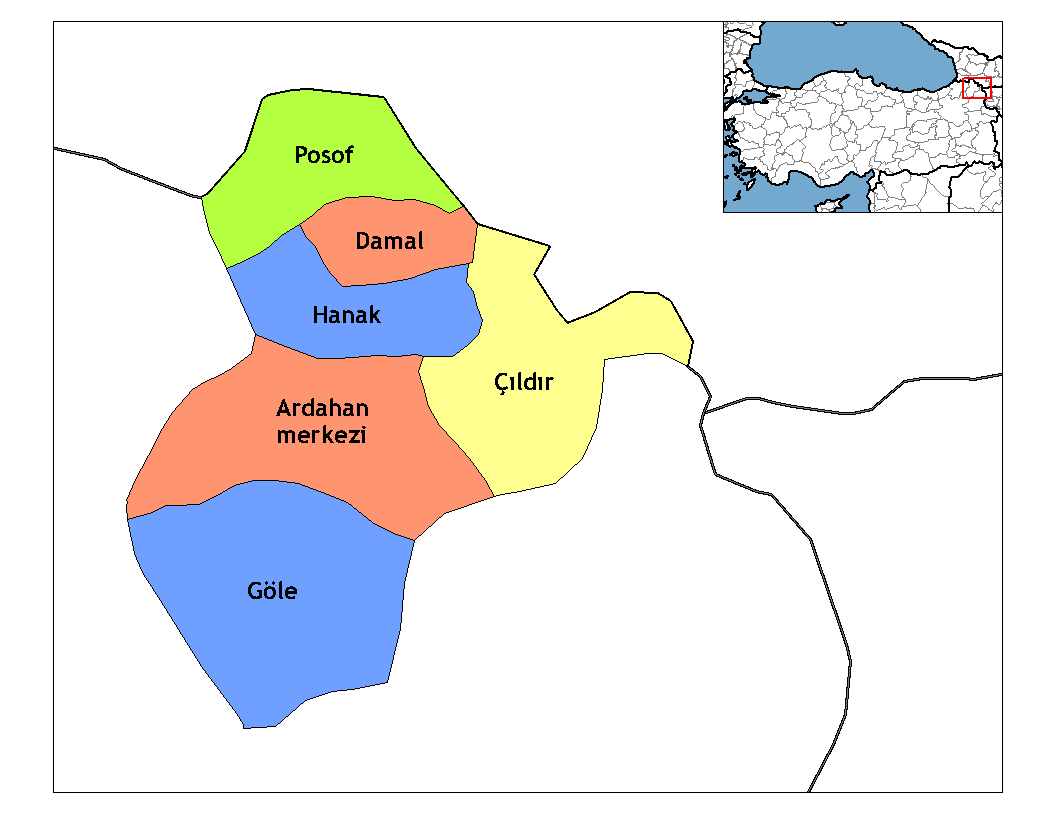
Districts of Ardahan

The following population data is based on the 2024 census. The list is sorted from highest to lowest population. According to the results of the local elections of March 31, 2024, mayors are listed with their parties.

Ardahan Province Population: 91,354

District	Population	Mayor	Party
Ardahan (Merkez)	42,146	Faruk Demir	CHP
Göle	22,214	Gökhan Budak	CHP
Çıldır	8,448	Kemal Yakup Azizoğlu	AKP
Hanak	7,836	Erdal Kurukaya	AKP
Posof	6,057	Erdem Demirci	CHP
Damal	4,653	Elvan Baran	Independent

==== Bingöl Province ====
(Entirely in the Eastern Anatolia Region)

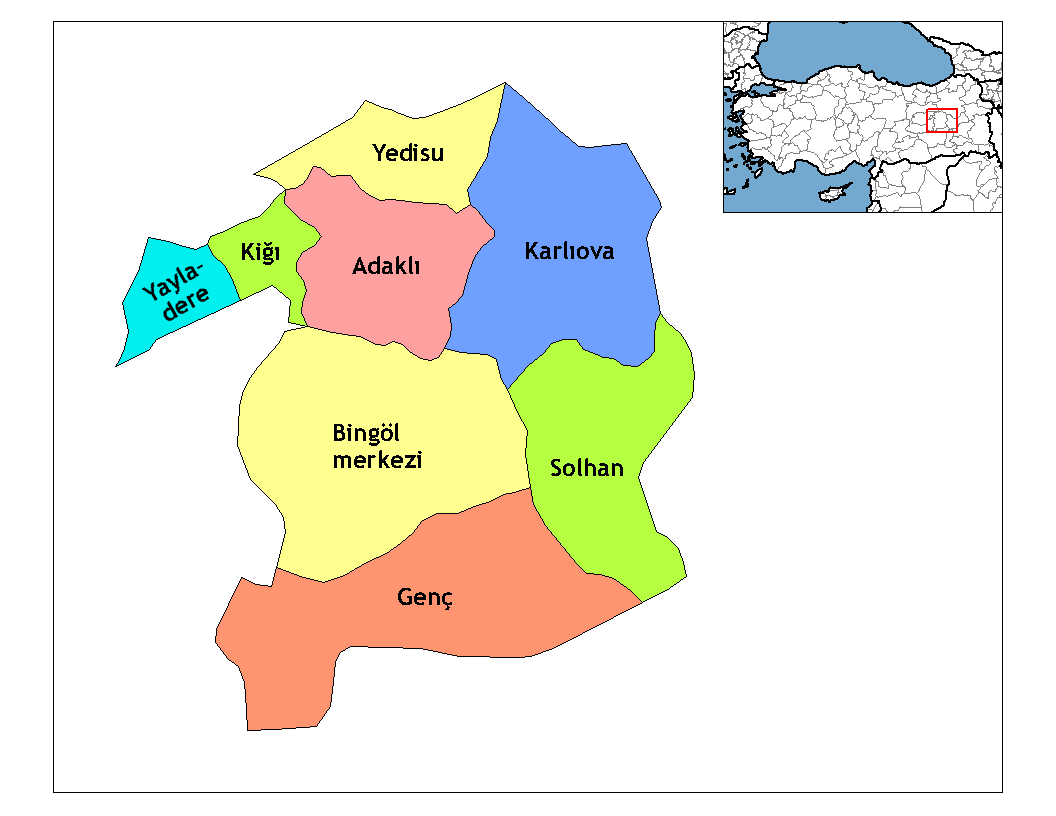
Districts of Bingöl

The following population data is based on the 2024 census. The list is sorted from highest to lowest population. According to the results of the local elections of March 31, 2024, mayors are listed with their parties.

Bingöl Province Population: 283,276

District	Mayor	Party
Bingöl (Merkez)	Erdal Arıkan	AK Party
Solhan	Abdulhakim Yıldız	AK Party
Genç	Kemal Tartar	Y.Refah Party
Karlıova	Veysi Bingöl	AK Party
Adaklı	Erdal Almalı	MHP
Kiğı	Hikmet Özüağ	AKP
Yedisu	Sedat Uçar	İyi Party
Yayladere	Nadir Ergin	AK Party

==== Bitlis Province ====
(Entirely in the Eastern Anatolia Region)

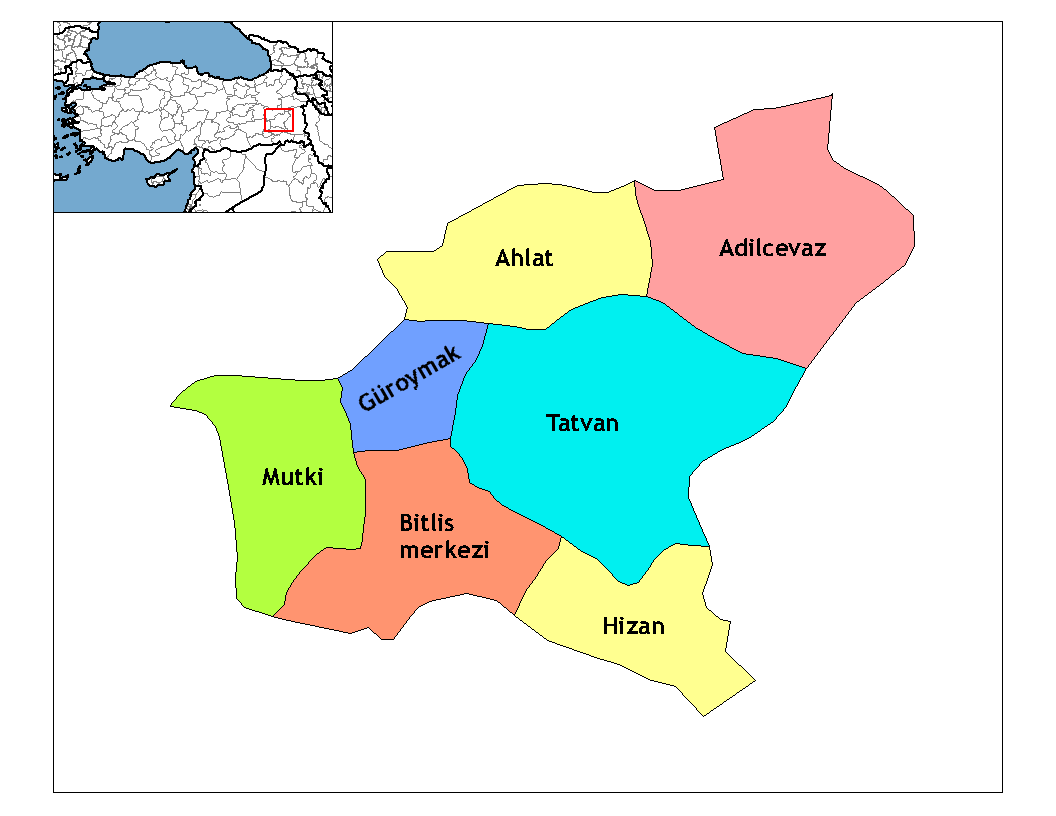
Districts of Bitlis

The following population data is based on the 2024 census. The list is sorted from highest to lowest population. According to the results of the local elections of March 31, 2024, mayors are listed with their parties.

Bitlis Province Population: 359,808

District	Population	Mayor	Party
Tatvan	103,752	Mümin Erol	DEM Party
Bitlis (Merkez)	73,678	Nesrullah Tanğlay	AK Party
Güroymak	49,090	Emrullah Yıldırım	Y.Refah Party
Ahlat	45,096	Yavuz Gülmez	AK Party
Hizan	31,030	Yahya Şam	AK Party
Adilcevaz	29,290	Abdullah Akbaba	AK Party
Mutki	27,872	Vahdettin Barlak	AK Party

==== Elazığ Province ====
(Entirely in the Eastern Anatolia Region)

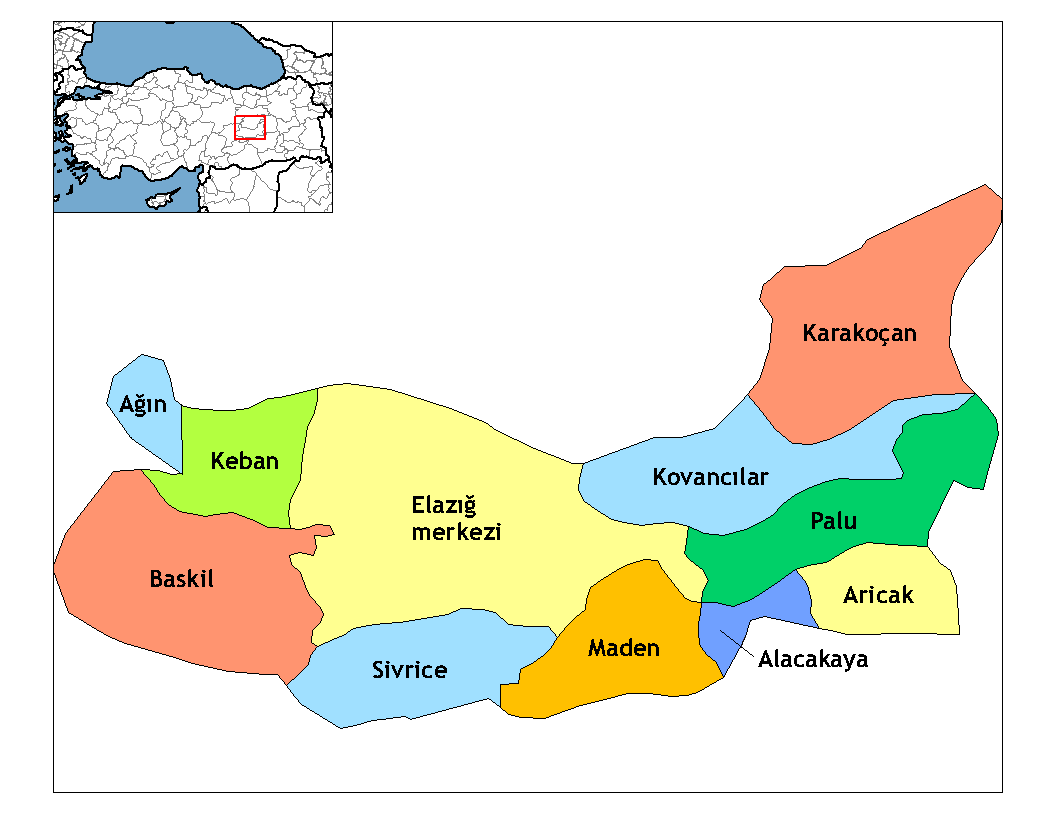
Districts of Elazığ

The following population data is based on the 2024 census. The list is sorted from highest to lowest population. According to the results of the local elections of March 31, 2024, mayors are listed with their parties.

Elazığ Province Population: 603,941

District	Population	Mayor	Party
Elazığ (Merkez)	458,747	Şahin Şerifoğulları	AK Party
Kovancılar	38,605	Vahap Gök	BBP
Karakoçan	28,645	Cafer Oğur	DEM
Palu	17,856	Muhammet Septioğlu	Y.Refah Party
Baskil	13,443	Tuncer Turus	MHP
Arıcak	13,161	Mehmet Yılmaz Yalçınkaya	AK Party
Maden	10,183	Musa Orhan	AK Party
Sivrice	8,446	Ebubekir Irmak	Y.Refah Party
Keban	6,629	Yücel Doğan	MHP
Alacakaya	5,647	Zafer Altınışık	Y.Refah Party
Ağın	2,579	Şeref Çakar	AK Party

==== Erzincan Province ====
(Mostly in the Eastern Anatolia Region)

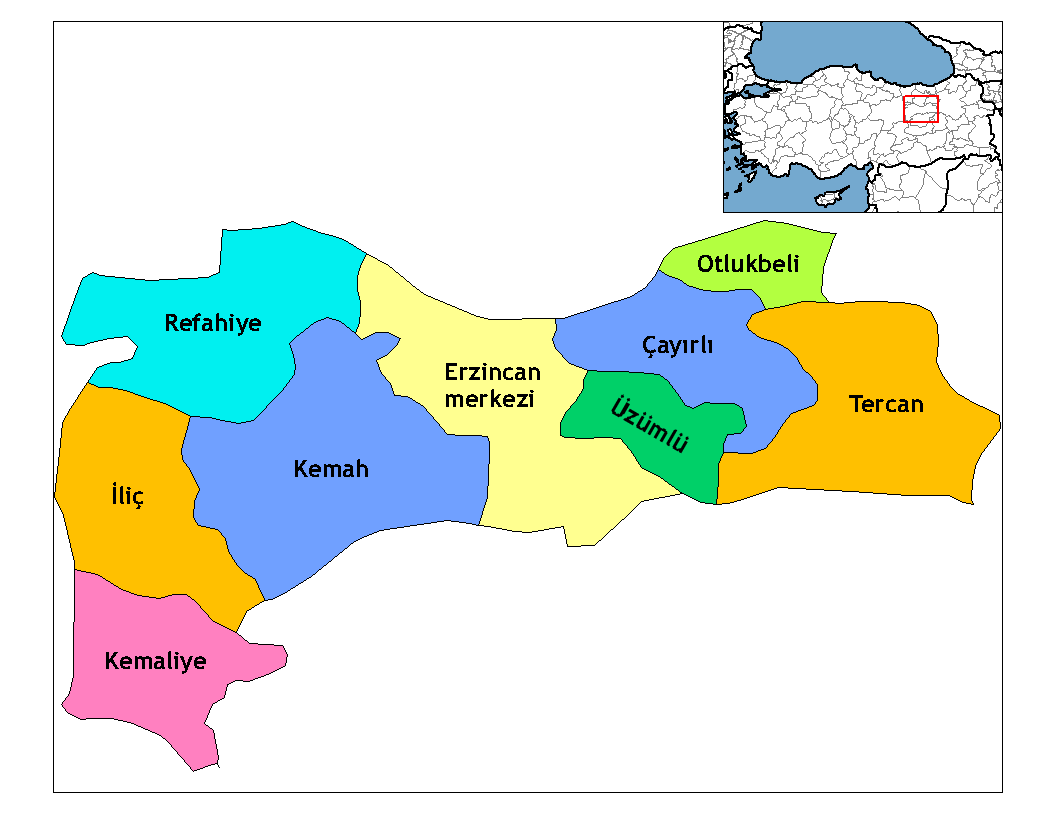
Districts of Erzincan

The following population data is based on the 2024 census. The list is sorted from highest to lowest population. According to the results of the local elections of March 31, 2024, mayors are listed with their parties.

Erzincan Province Population: 241,239

District	Population	Mayor	Party
Erzincan (Merkez)	168,093	Bekir Aksun	MHP
Tercan	16,351	Mehmet Yılmaz	MHP
Üzümlü	14,265	Lütfi Yakut	MHP
Refahiye	11,609	Fatih Kök	BBP
İliç	9,134	Mehmet Elçi	MHP
Çayırlı	7,977	Oktay Efe	MHP
Kemah	6,850	Cevdet Bayram	MHP
Kemaliye	4,774	Erdem Atmaca	AK Party
Otlukbeli	2,186	Yusuf Tektaş	MHP

==== Erzurum Province ====
(Mostly in the Eastern Anatolia Region)

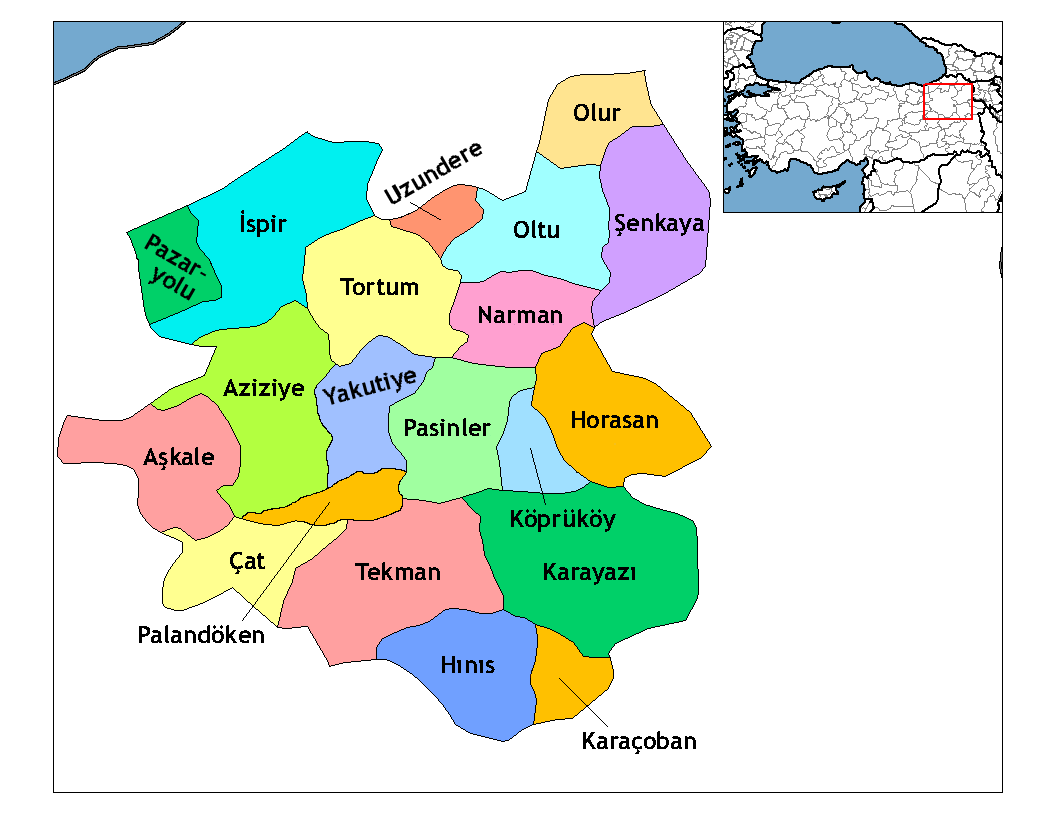
Districts of Erzurum

The following population data is based on the 2024 census. The list is sorted from highest to lowest population. According to the results of the local elections of March 31, 2024, mayors are listed with their parties.

Erzurum Province Population: 745,005

District	Population	Mayor	Party
Yakutiye	191,228	Mahmut Uçar	AK Party
Palandöken	179,286	Muhammet Sunar	AK Party
Aziziye	70,032	Emrullah Akpunar	Y.Refah Party
Horasan	35,642	Hayrettin Özdemir	Iyi Party
Oltu	30,374	Adem Çelebi	AK Party
Pasinler	26,041	Ünsal Sertoğlu	AK Party
Hınıs	23,707	Serdal Şan	AK Party
Karayazı	23,376	Bahar Göksu	DEM Party
Tekman	21,682	Abdurrahman Sever	DEM Party
Karaçoban	20,733	Kazım Erhan	DEM Party
Aşkale	20,700	Şenol Polat	AK Party
Şenkaya	15,412	Görbil Özcan	CHP
Tortum	14,787	Muammer Yiğider	AK Party
İspir	14,765	Ahmet Coşkun	MHP
Çat	14,641	Arif Hikmet Kılıç	CHP
Köprüköy	13,393	Nevzat Karasu	Y.Refah Party
Narman	11,536	Aydemir Adem Kınalı	AK Party
Uzundere	7,664	Muhammet Halis Özsoy	BBP
Olur	6,220	Vedat Ergün	MHP
Pazaryolu	3,786	İbrahim Şahin	AK Party

==== Hakkâri Province ====
(Entirely in the Eastern Anatolia Region)

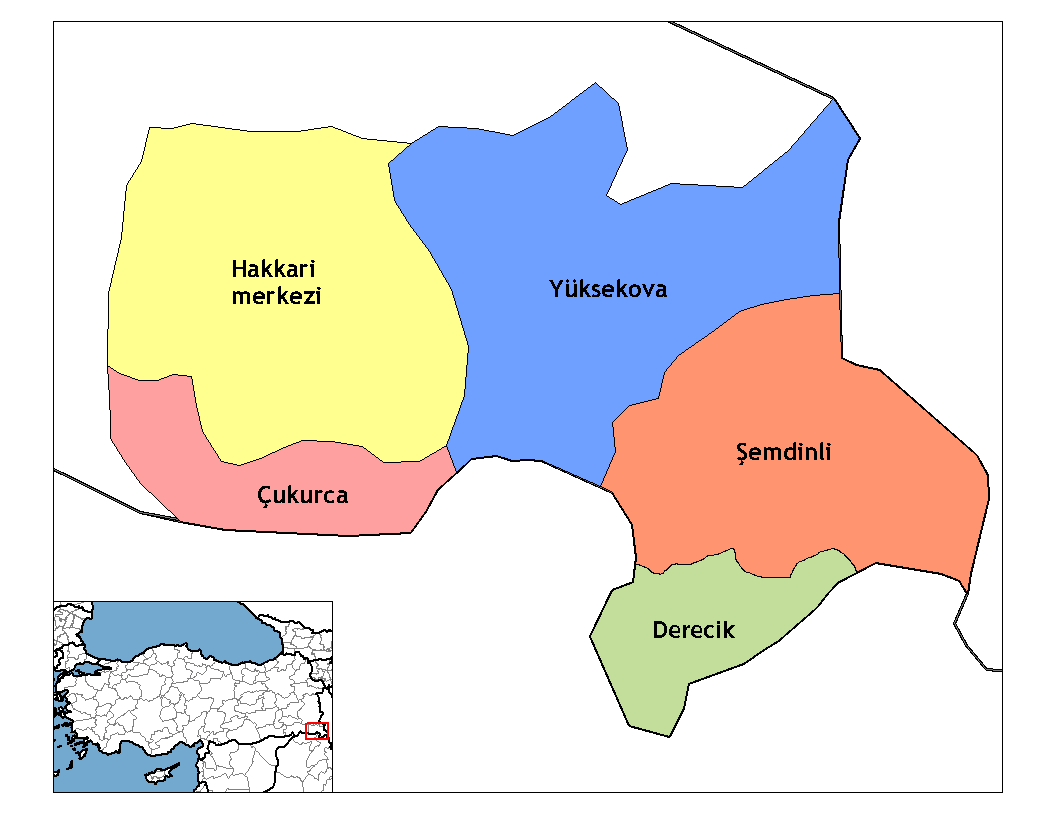
Districts of Hakkâri

The following population data is based on the 2024 census. The list is sorted from highest to lowest population. According to the results of the local elections of March 31, 2024, mayors are listed with their parties.

Hakkari Province Population: 282,191

District	Population	Mayor	Party
Yüksekova	121,153	Şadiye Kırmızıgül	DEM Party
Hakkari (Merkez)	76,630	Mehmet Sıddık Akış	DEM Party
Şemdinli	43,571	Fahri Şakar	AK Party
Derecik	25,209	Hasan Dinç	Y.Refah Party
Çukurca	15,628	Nazmi Demir	AK Party

==== Iğdır Province ====
(Entirely in the Eastern Anatolia Region)

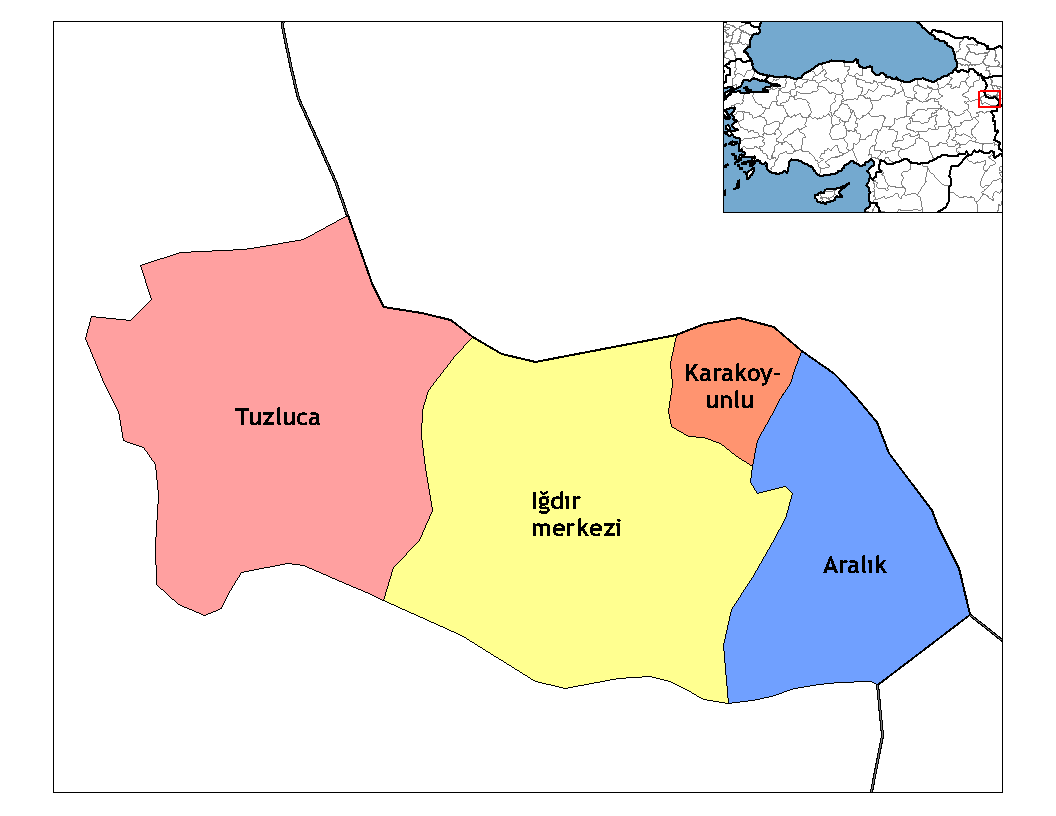
Districts of Iğdır

The following population data is based on the 2024 census. The list is sorted from highest to lowest population. According to the results of the local elections of March 31, 2024, mayors are listed with their parties.

Iğdır Province Population: 206,857

District	Population	Mayor	Party
Iğdır (Merkez)	152,454	Mehmet Nuri Güneş	DEM Party
Tuzluca	22,182	Cemal Kurnaz	CHP
Aralık	19,485	Mustafa Güzelkaya	AKP
Karakoyunlu	12,736	Bayramali Ballı	MHP

==== Kars Province ====
(Entirely in the Eastern Anatolia Region)

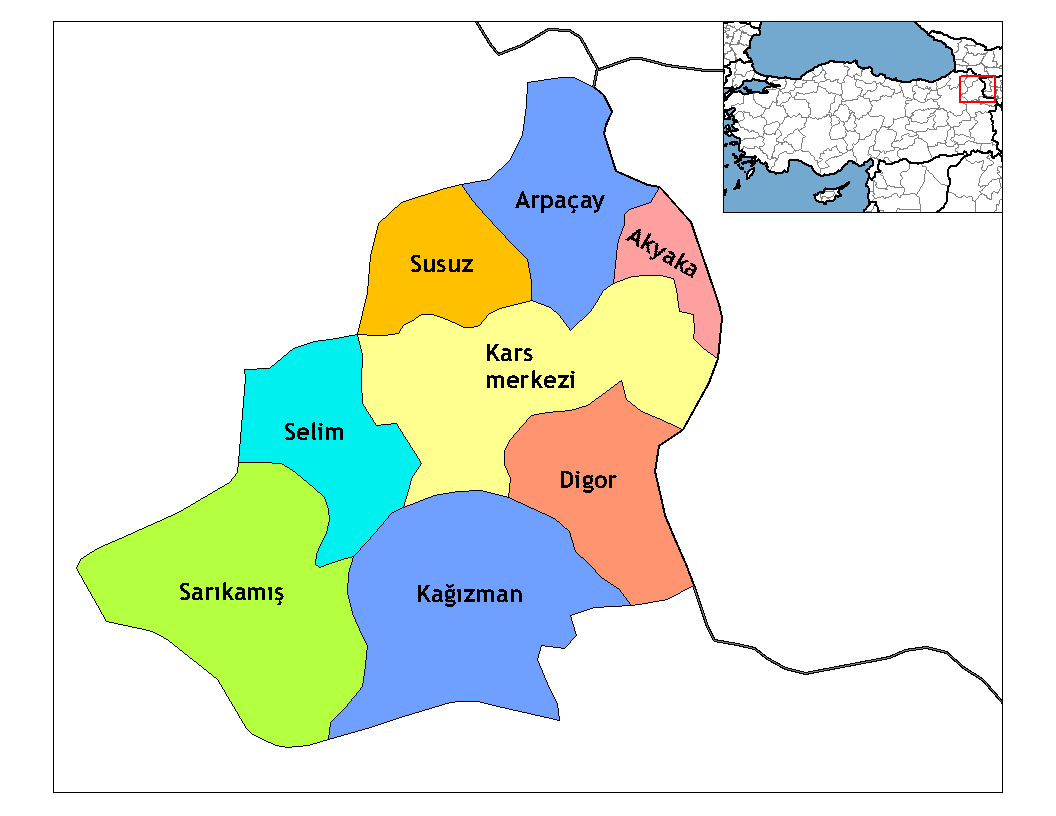
Districts of Kars

The following population data is based on the 2024 census. The list is sorted from highest to lowest population. According to the results of the local elections of March 31, 2024, mayors are listed with their parties.

Kars Province Population: 272,300

District	Population	Mayor	Party
Kars (Merkez)	120,948	Ötüken Senger	MHP
Kağızman	43,331	Mehmet Alkan	DEM Party
Sarıkamış	36,293	Serdar Kılıç	MHP
Selim	20,725	İlyas Barış Koç	CHP
Digor	18,528	Adem Oyman	DEM Party
Arpaçay	14,143	Zeki Elma	Other AKP
Akyaka	9,693	Ergüder Toptaş	AKP
Susuz	8,639	Oğuz Yantemur	CHP

==== Malatya Province ====
(Entirely in the Eastern Anatolia Region)

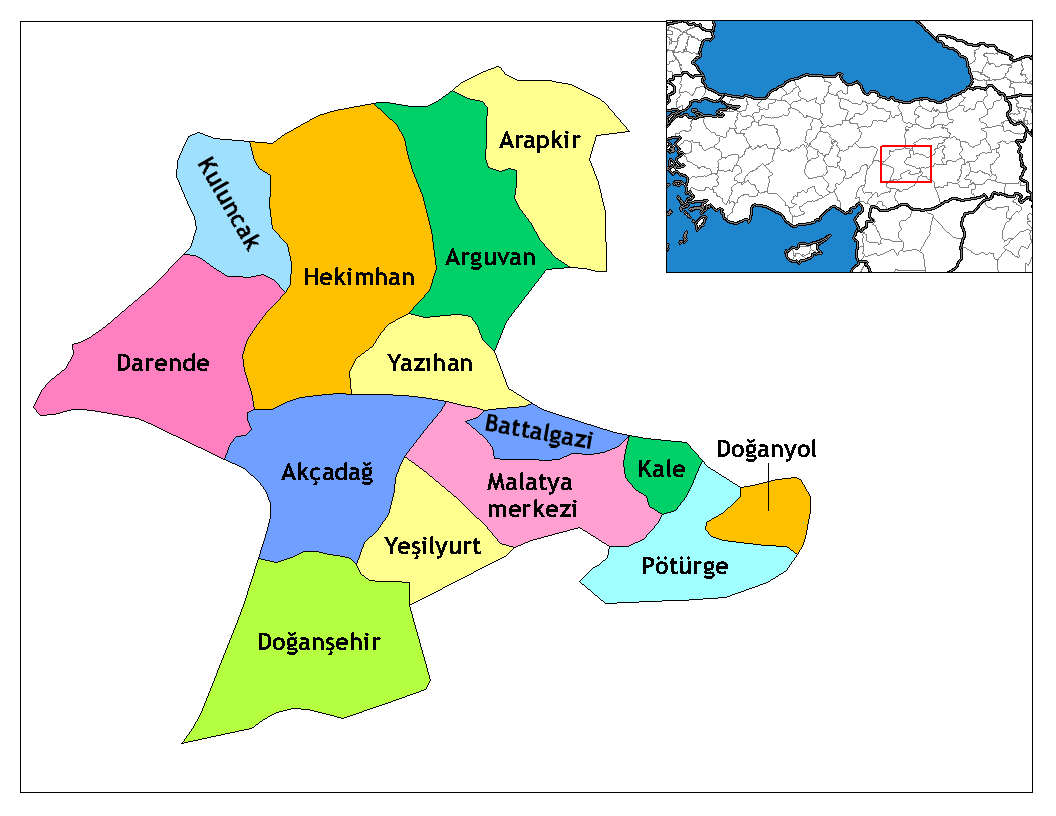
Districts of Malatya

The following population data is based on the 2024 census. The list is sorted from highest to lowest population. According to the results of the local elections of March 31, 2024, mayors are listed with their parties.

Malatya Province Population: 750,491

District	Mayor	Party
Yeşilyurt	İlhan Geçit	AK Party
Battalgazi	Bayram Taşkın	AK Party
Doğanşehir	Memet Bayram	CHP
Akçadağ	Hasan Ulutaş	AK Party
Darende	Alican Bozkurt	AK Party
Hekimhan	Mehmet Şerif Yıldırım	CHP
Yazıhan	Abdulvahap Göçer	CHP
Pütürge	Mikail Sülük	AK Party
Arapgir	Haluk Cömertoğlu	CHP
Kuluncak	Erhan Cengiz	MHP
Arguvan	Ersoy Eren	CHP
Kale	İhsan Özbay	AK Party
Doğanyol	Hakan Bay	AK Party

==== Muş Province ====
(Entirely in the Eastern Anatolia Region)

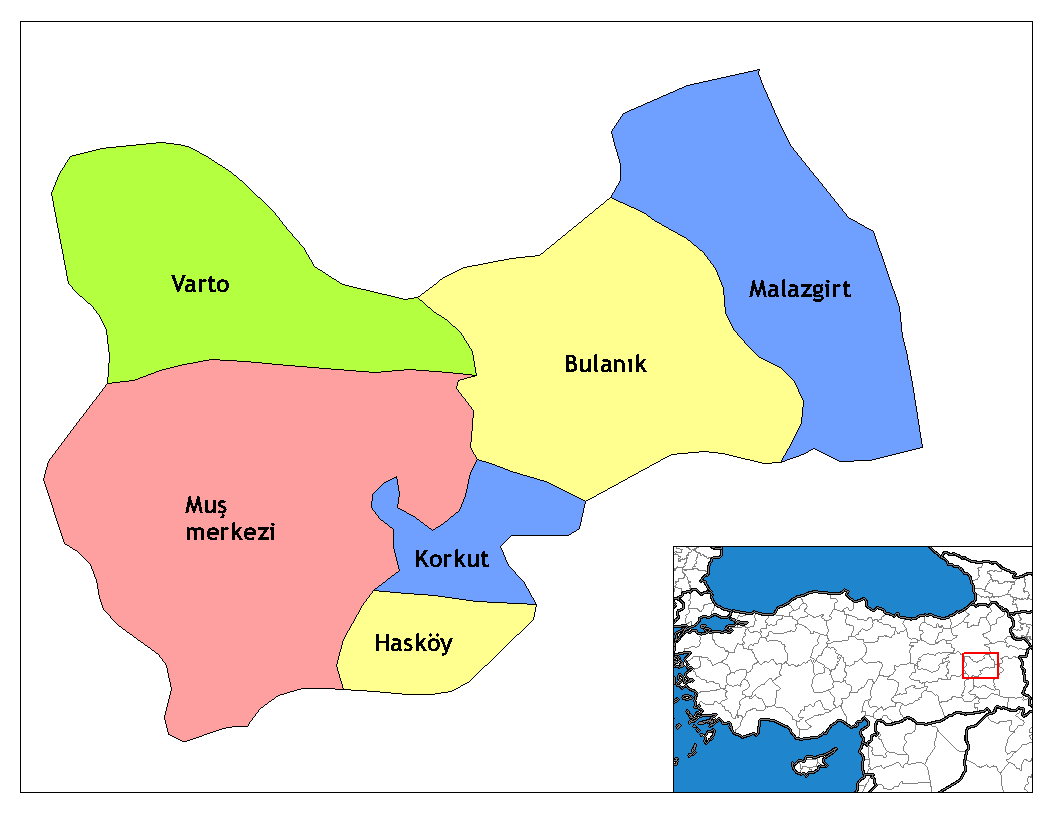
Districts of Muş

The following population data is based on the 2024 census. The list is sorted from highest to lowest population. According to the results of the local elections of March 31, 2024, mayors are listed with their parties.

Muş Province Population: 392,301

District	Population	Mayor	Party
Muş (Merkez)	202,012	Sırrı Söylemez	DEM Party
Bulanık	70,568	Aryan Doğan	DEM Party
Malazgirt	42,135	Ahmet Kenan Türker	DEM Party
Varto	29,174	Gıyasettin Aydemir	DEM Party
Hasköy	26,336	Cemal Orbay	MHP
Korkut	22,076	Haşim Arık	AK Party

==== Şırnak Province ====
(Mostly in the Eastern Anatolia Region)

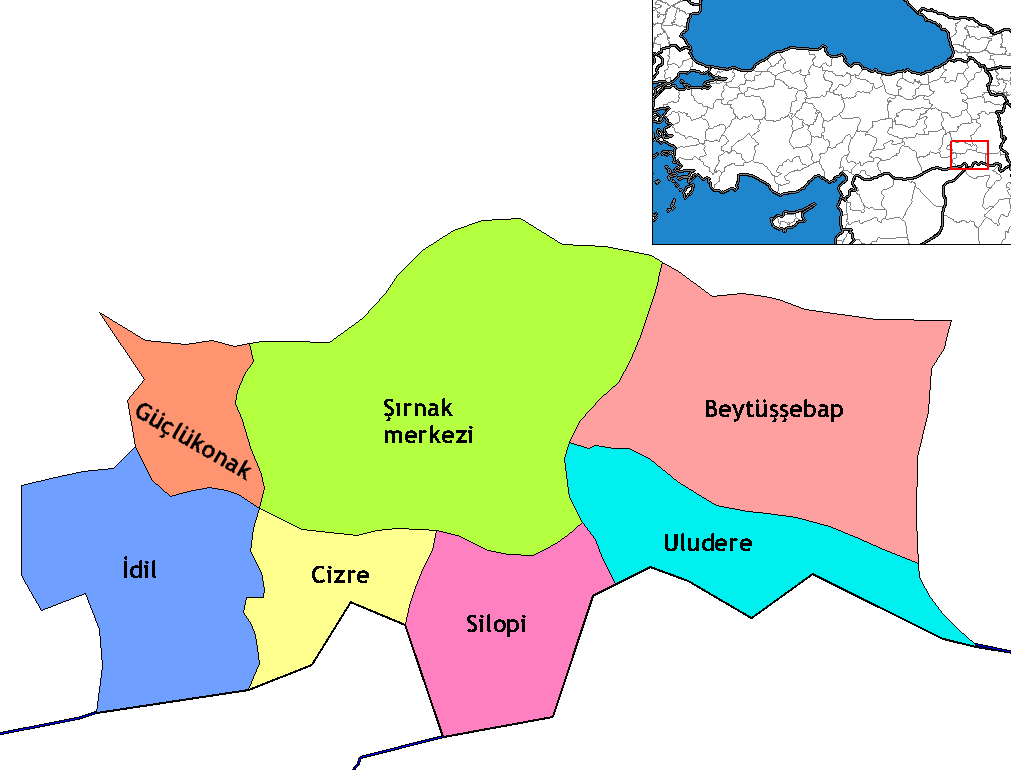
Districts of Şırnak

The following population data is based on the 2024 census. The list is sorted from highest to lowest population. According to the results of the local elections of March 31, 2024, mayors are listed with their parties.

Şırnak Province Population: 570,826

District	Population	Mayor	Party
Cizre	163,883	Güler Yerbasan	DEM Party
Silopi	150,712	Jiyan Ormanlı	DEM Party
Şırnak (Merkez)	105,908	Mehmet Yarka	AK Party
İdil	76,698	Türkan Kayır	DEM Party
Uludere	46,221	Gürgin Ürek	AK Party
Beytüşşebap	14,809	Kamil Dürmüş	AK Party
Güçlükonak	12,595	Selahattin Aktuğ	BBP

==== Tunceli Province ====
(Entirely in the Eastern Anatolia Region)

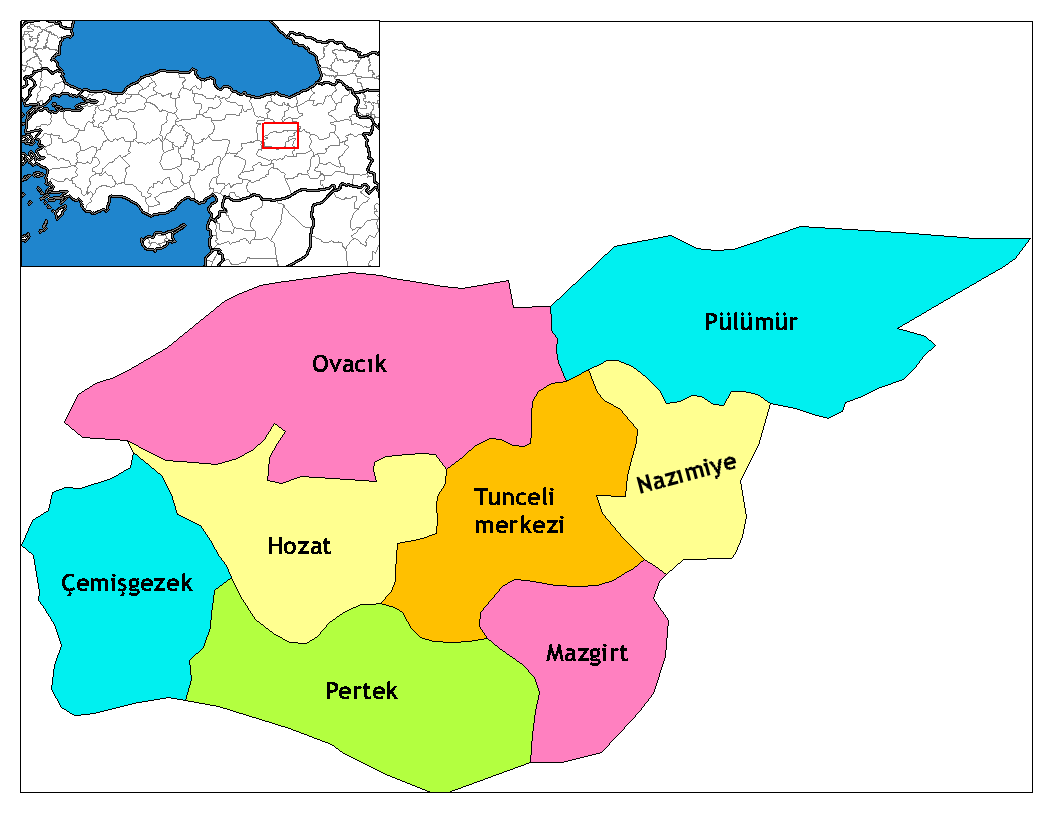
Districts of Tunceli

The following population data is based on the 2024 census. The list is sorted from highest to lowest population. According to the results of the local elections of March 31, 2024, mayors are listed with their parties.

Tunceli Province Population: 86,612

District	Population	Mayor	Party
Tunceli (Merkez)	41,360	Cevdet Konak	DEM Party
Pertek	10,975	Recai Vural	AK Party
Çemişgezek	7,676	İbrahim Enes Somyürek	AK Party
Mazgirt	7,359	Ümit Tayhava	CHP
Ovacık	6,889	Mustafa Sarıgül	CHP
Hozat	5,459	Aydın Kaya	SOL Party
Pülümür	3,762	Müslüm Tosun	CHP
Nazımiye	3,132	Ali Emrah Tekin	CHP

==== Van Province ====
(Entirely in the Eastern Anatolia Region)

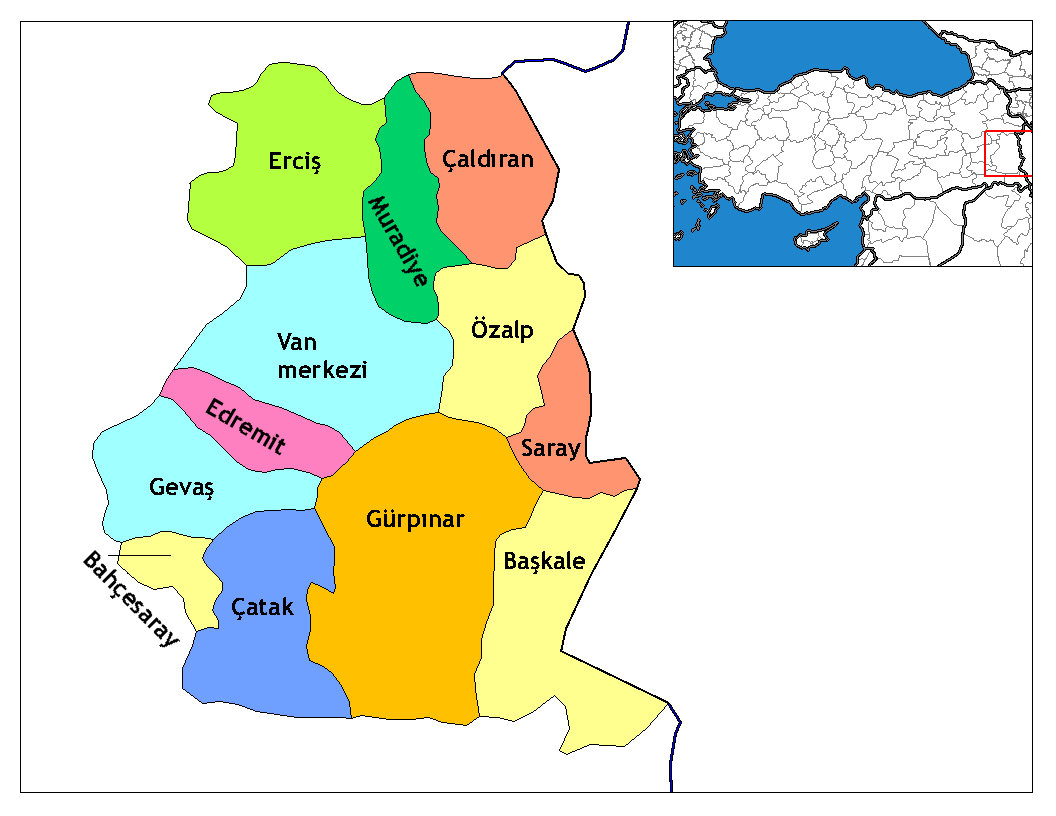
Districts of Van

The following population data is based on the 2024 census. The list is sorted from highest to lowest population. According to the results of the local elections of March 31, 2024, mayors are listed with their parties.

Van Province Population: 1,118,087

District	Population	Mayor	Party
İpekyolu	356,977	Abdullah Zeydan	DEM Party
Erciş	170,209	Baran Bilici	DEM Party
Tuşba	165,885	Hanım Akkoş	DEM Party
Edremit	130,768	Rabia Başak Koç	DEM Party
Özalp	53,966	Sakine Kutpınar	DEM Party
Çaldıran	52,614	Hatice Atabay Gündoğdu	DEM Party
Muradiye	42,986	Hediye Sayıner	DEM Party
Başkale	41,159	Şengül Polat	DEM Party
Gürpınar	29,982	Mehmet Tahir Ertaş	DEM Party
Gevaş	26,597	Ruknettin Hakan	DEM Party
Çatak	17,389	Reşat Eraslan	DEM Party
Saray	17,382	Davut Acar	DEM Party
Bahçesaray	12,173	Ayvaz Hazir	DEM Party

=== Black Sea region ===
==== Amasya Province ====
(Entirely in the Black Sea Region)

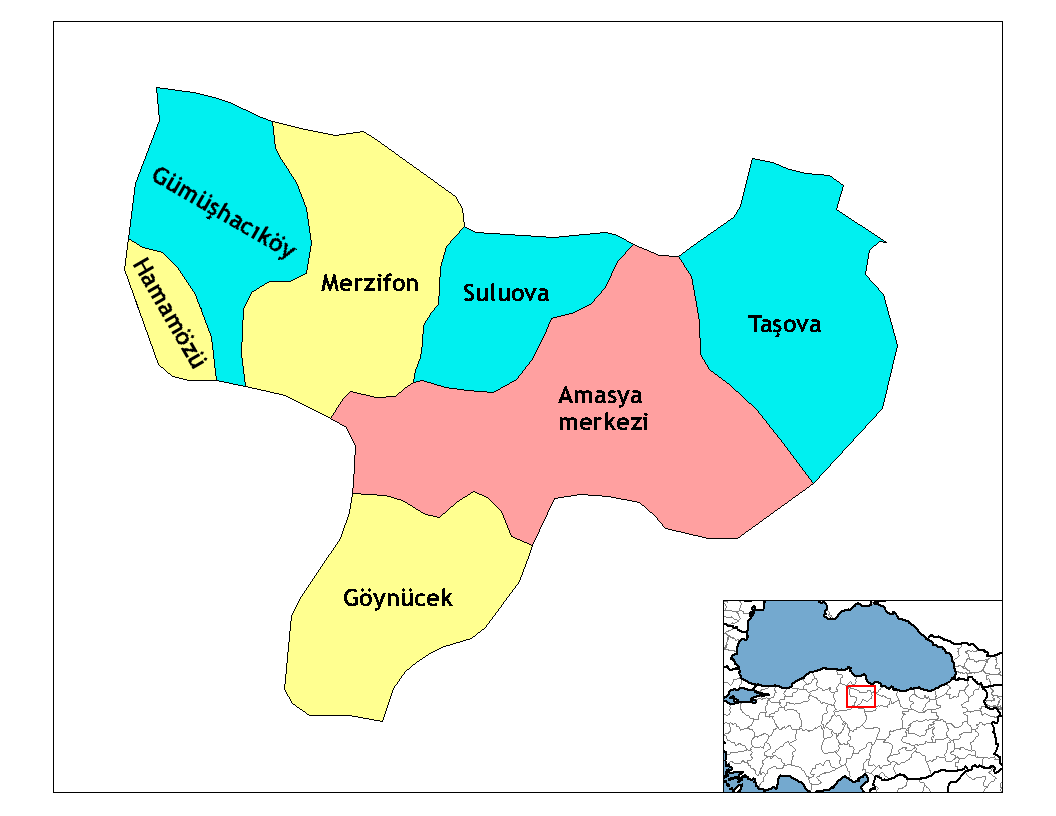
Districts of Amasya

The following population data is based on the 2024 census. The list is sorted from highest to lowest population. According to the results of the local elections of March 31, 2024, mayors are listed with their parties.

Amasya Province Population: 342,378

District	Population	Mayor	Party
Amasya (Merkez)	151,058	Turgay Sevindi	CHP
Merzifon	76,854	Alp Kargı	CHP
Suluova	47,101	Rıfat Uzun	MHP
Taşova	30,348	Ömer Özalp	CHP
Gümüşhacıköy	22,663	Zehra Özyol	CHP
Göynücek	10,787	Kemal Şahin	AK Party
Hamamözü	3,567	Cihan Demir	AK Party

==== Artvin Province ====
(Mostly in the Black Sea Region)

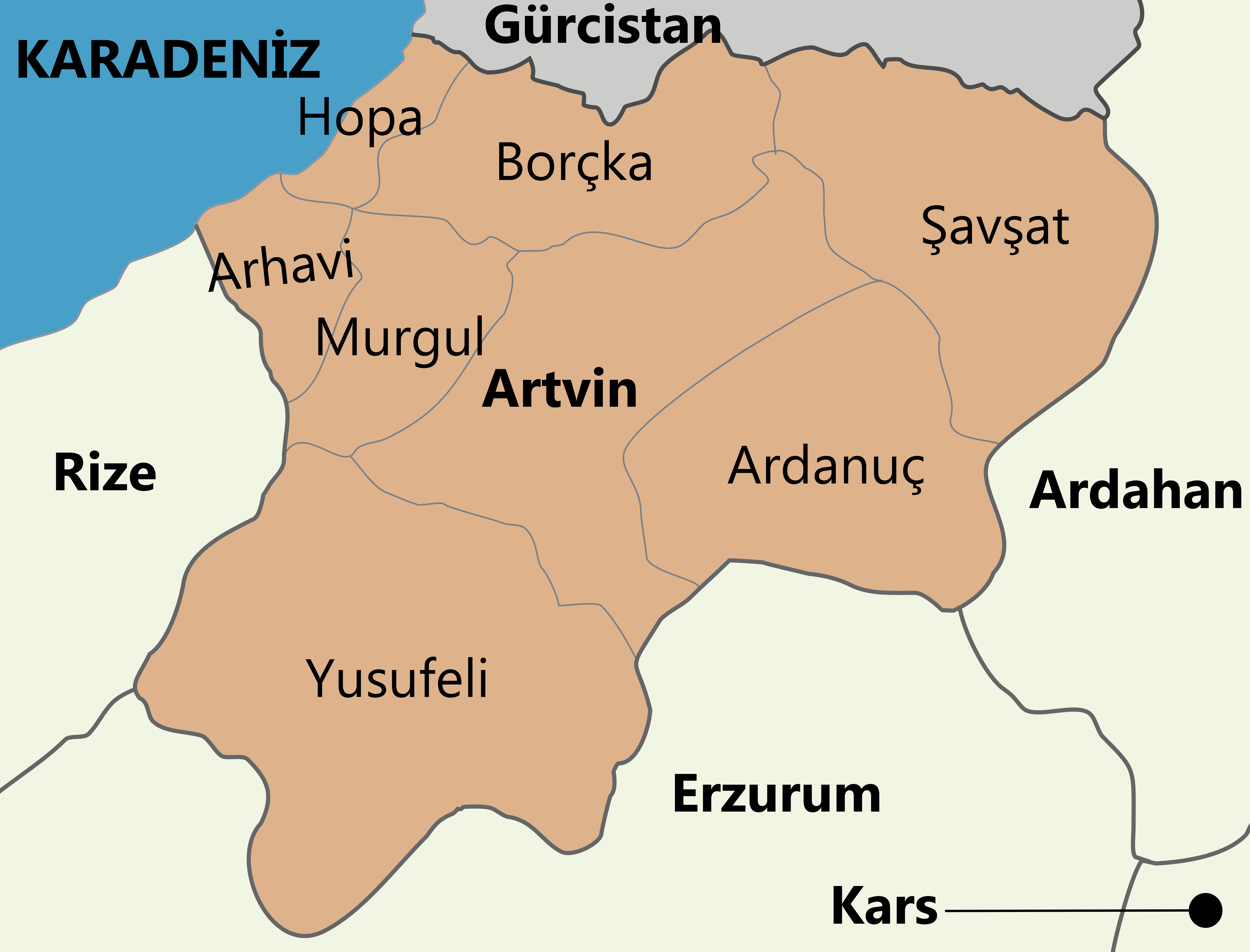
Districts of Artvin

The following population data is based on the 2024 census. The list is sorted from highest to lowest population. According to the results of the local elections of March 31, 2024, mayors are listed with their parties.

Artvin Province Population: 169,280

District	Population	Mayor	Party
Artvin (Merkez)	36,071	Bilgehan Erdem	CHP
Hopa	27,806	Utku Cihan	CHP
Borçka	22,288	Ercan Orhan	CHP
Arhavi	21,821	Turgay Ataselim	AK Party
Yusufeli	18,080	Barış Demirci	CHP
Şavşat	16,534	Durmuş Aydın	AK Party
Ardanuç	11,006	Emrah Yılmaz	AK Party
Kemalpaşa	9,343	Erhan Yılmaz	CHP
Murgul	6,331	Mehmet Yıldırım	CHP

==== Bartın Province ====
(Entirely in the Black Sea Region)

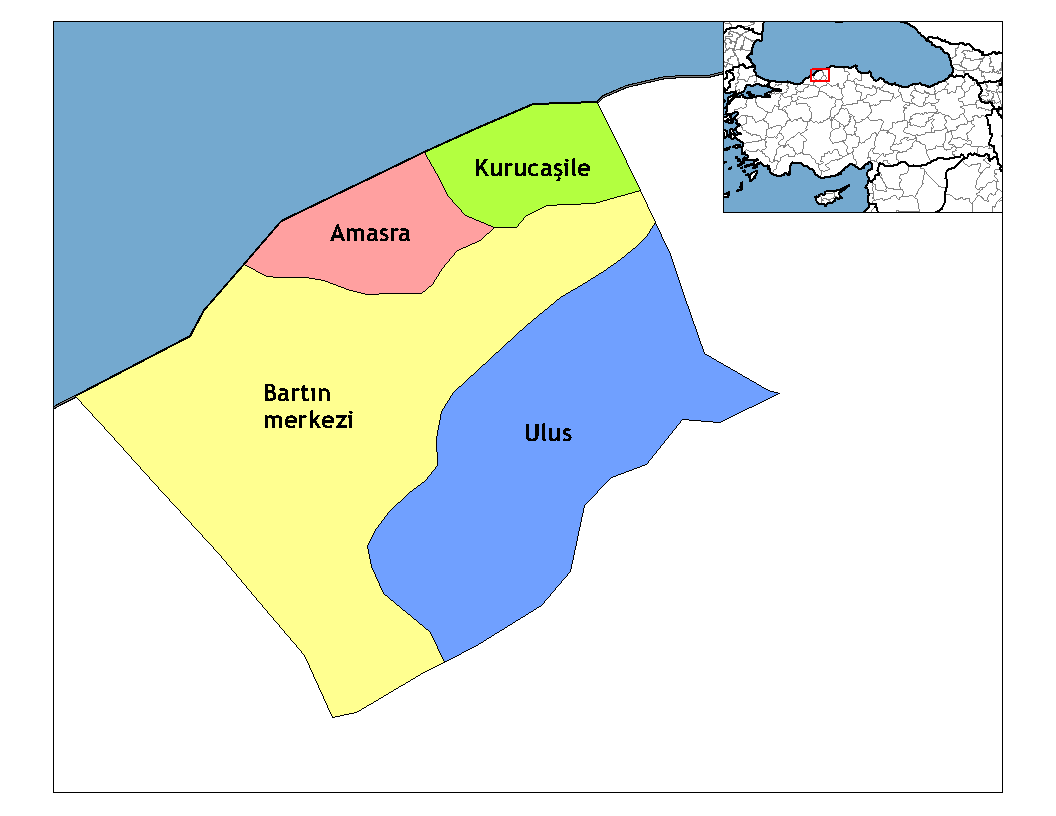
Districts of Bartın

The following population data is based on the 2024 census. The list is sorted from highest to lowest population. According to the results of the local elections of March 31, 2024, mayors are listed with their parties.

Bartın Province Population: 206,715

District	Population	Mayor	Party
Bartın (Merkez)	162,793	Muhammet Rıza Yalçınkaya	CHP
Ulus	23,256	Hasan Hüseyin Uzun	AK Party
Amasra	14,107	Recai Çakır	CHP
Kurucaşile	6,559	Uğur Güneş	CHP

==== Bayburt Province ====
(Mostly in the Black Sea Region)

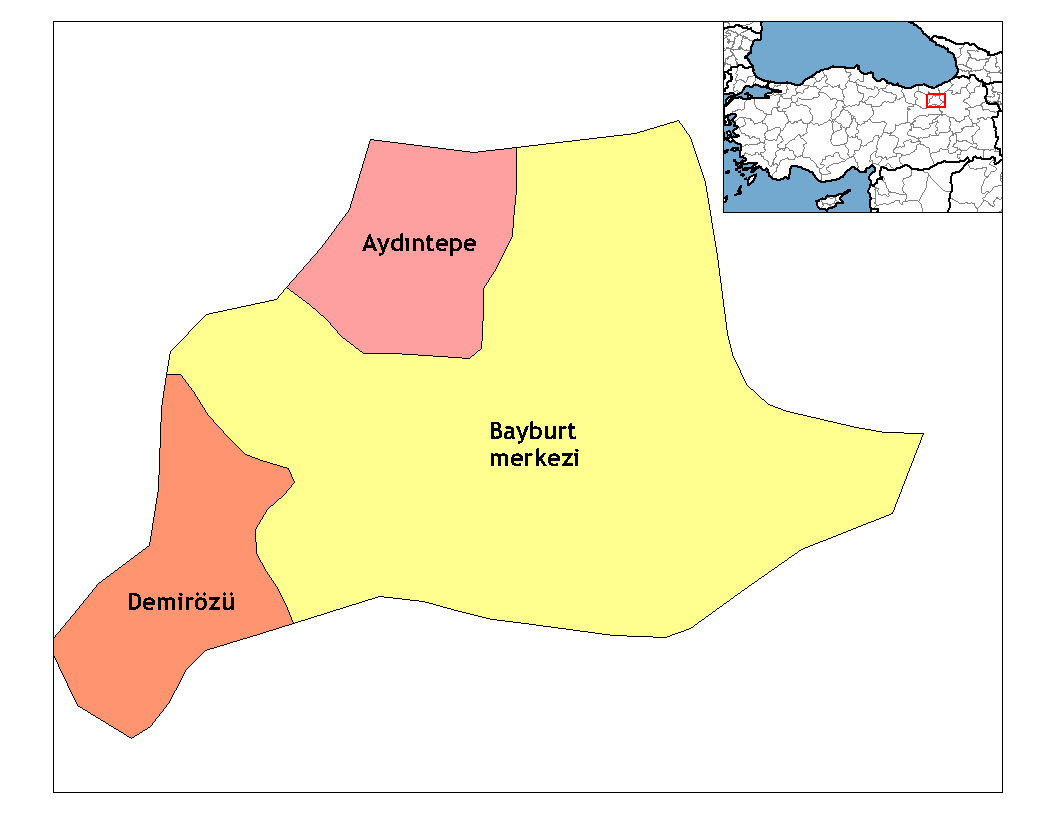
Districts of Bayburt

- The following population data is based on the 2024 census. The list is sorted from highest to lowest population. According to the results of the local elections of March 31, 2024, mayors are listed with their parties.

Bayburt Province Population: 83,676

District	Population	Mayor	Party
Bayburt (Merkez)	69,029	Mete Memiş	AK Party
Demirözü	8,259	Arslan Gürer	AK Party
Aydıntepe	6,388	Haşim Şentürk	MHP

==== Bolu Province ====
(Entirely in the Black Sea Region)

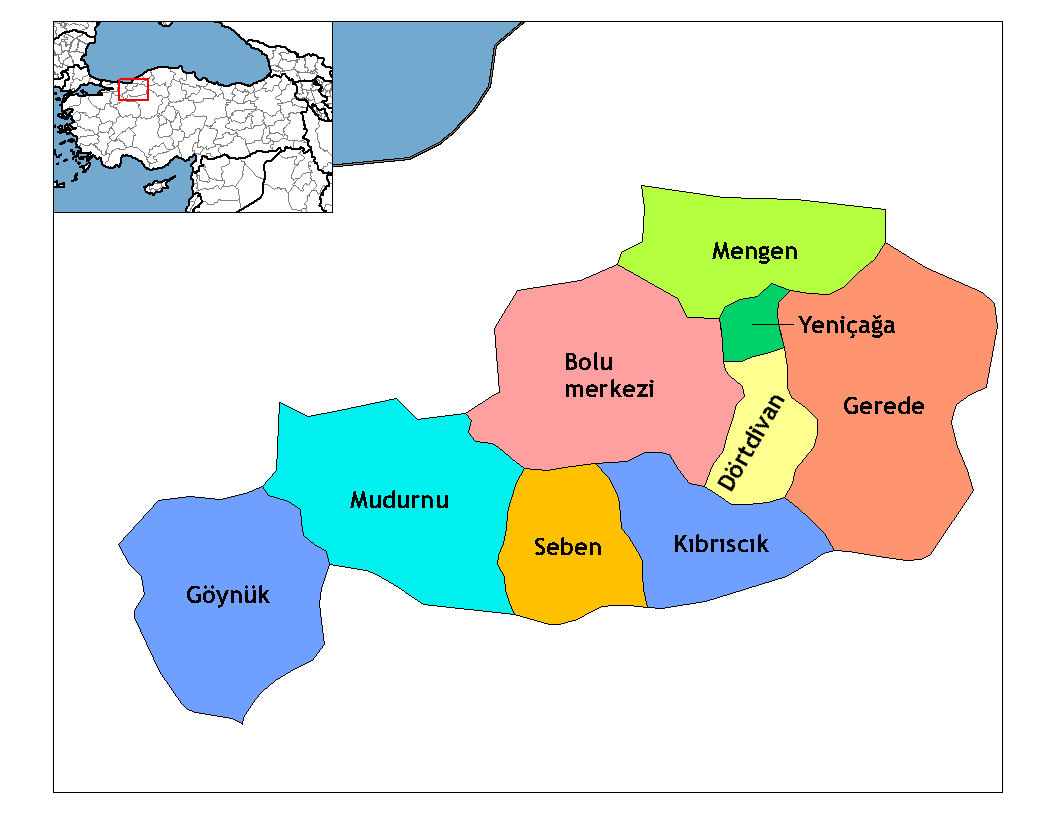
Districts of Bolu

The following population data is based on the 2024 census. The list is sorted from highest to lowest population. According to the results of the local elections of March 31, 2024, mayors are listed with their parties.

Bolu Province Population: 326,409

District	Population	Mayor	Party
Bolu (Merkez)	222,340	Tanju Özcan	CHP
Gerede	36,927	Mustafa Allar	AK Party
Mudurnu	18,360	Doğan Onurlu	CHP
Göynük	14,412	Ali Oral	CHP
Mengen	13,964	Vural Turan	AK Party
Yeniçağa	6,585	Recayi Çağlar	AK Party
Dörtdivan	6,407	Hamza Efe	AK Party
Seben	4,604	Uygar Oturakdaş	CHP
Kıbrıscık	2,810	Emin Tekemen	CHP

==== Çorum Province ====
(Mostly in the Black Sea Region)

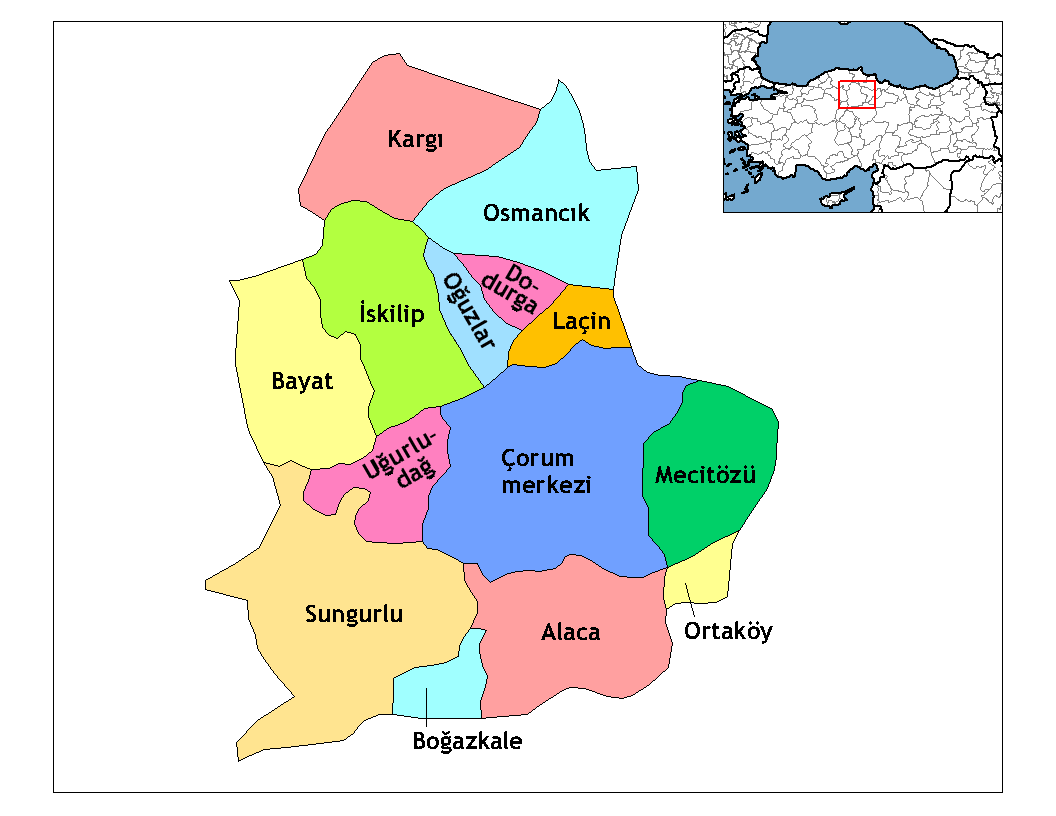
Districts of Çorum

The following population data is based on the 2024 census. The list is sorted from highest to lowest population. According to the results of the local elections of March 31, 2024, mayors are listed with their parties.

Çorum Province Population: 521,335

District	Population	Mayor	Party
Çorum (Merkez)	297,255	Halil İbrahim Aşgın	AK Party
Sungurlu	48,844	Muhsin Dere	MHP
Osmancık	43,056	Ahmet Gelgör	MHP
Alaca	29,448	Şerif Arslan	MHP
İskilip	28,817	İsmail Çizikci	AK Party
Kargı	15,518	Hamit Dereli	CHP
Bayat	13,954	Ahmet Bahadır Ünlü	AK Party
Mecitözü	13,480	Veli Aylar	CHP
Ortaköy	6,553	Taner İsbir	AK Party
Uğurludağ	6,282	Remzi Torun	AK Party
Dodurga	5,325	İsmail Çetinkaya	MHP
Oğuzlar	4,794	Mustafa Cebeci	CHP
Laçin	4,336	Mustafa Toydemir	AK Party
Boğazkale	3,673	Adem Özel	AK Party

==== Düzce Province ====
(Entirely in the Black Sea Region)

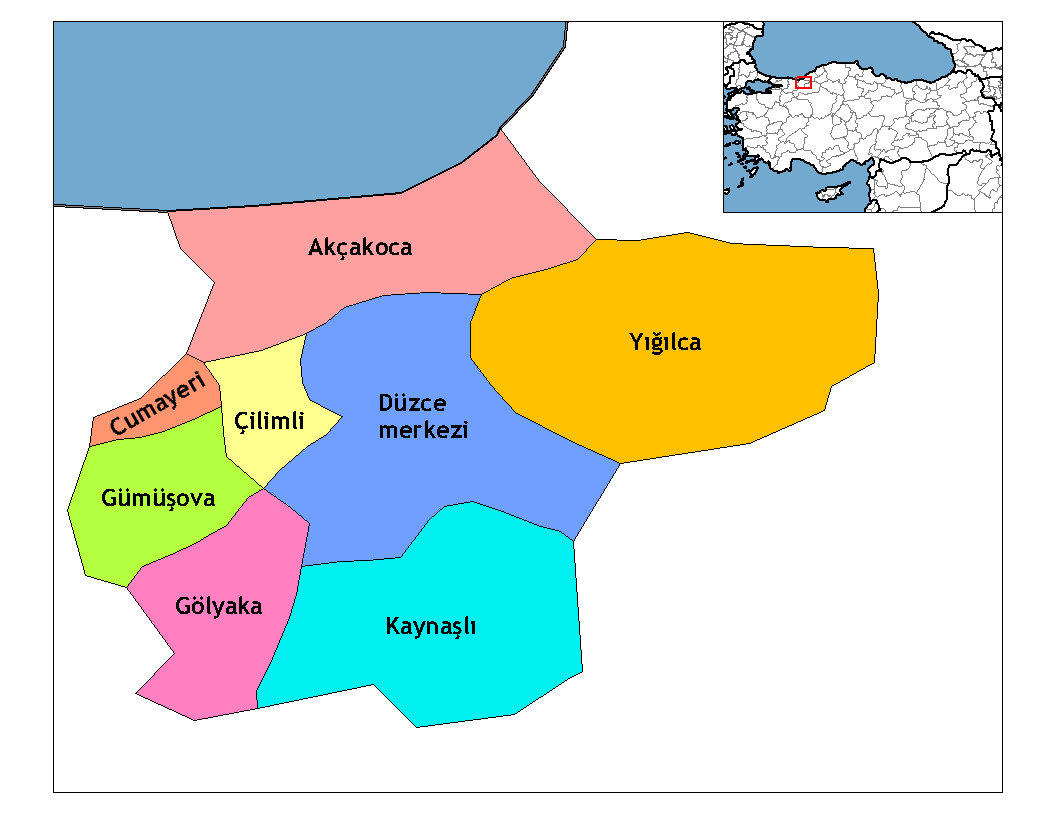
Districts of Düzce

The following population data is based on the 2024 census. The list is sorted from highest to lowest population. According to the results of the local elections of March 31, 2024, mayors are listed with their parties.

Düzce Province Population: 412,344

District	Population	Mayor	Party
Düzce (Merkez)	263,220	Faruk Özlü	AK Party
Akçakoca	41,233	Fikret Albayrak	CHP
Gölyaka	20,930	Muzaffer Coşkun	MHP
Kaynaşlı	20,539	Efdal Altundal	MHP
Çilimli	19,116	Yılmaz Yıldız	AK Party
Gümüşova	17,205	Kenan Sübekci	AK Party
Cumayeri	16,011	Mustafa Koloğlu	MHP
Yığılca	14,090	Selami Savaş	AK Party

==== Giresun Province ====
(Entirely in the Black Sea Region)

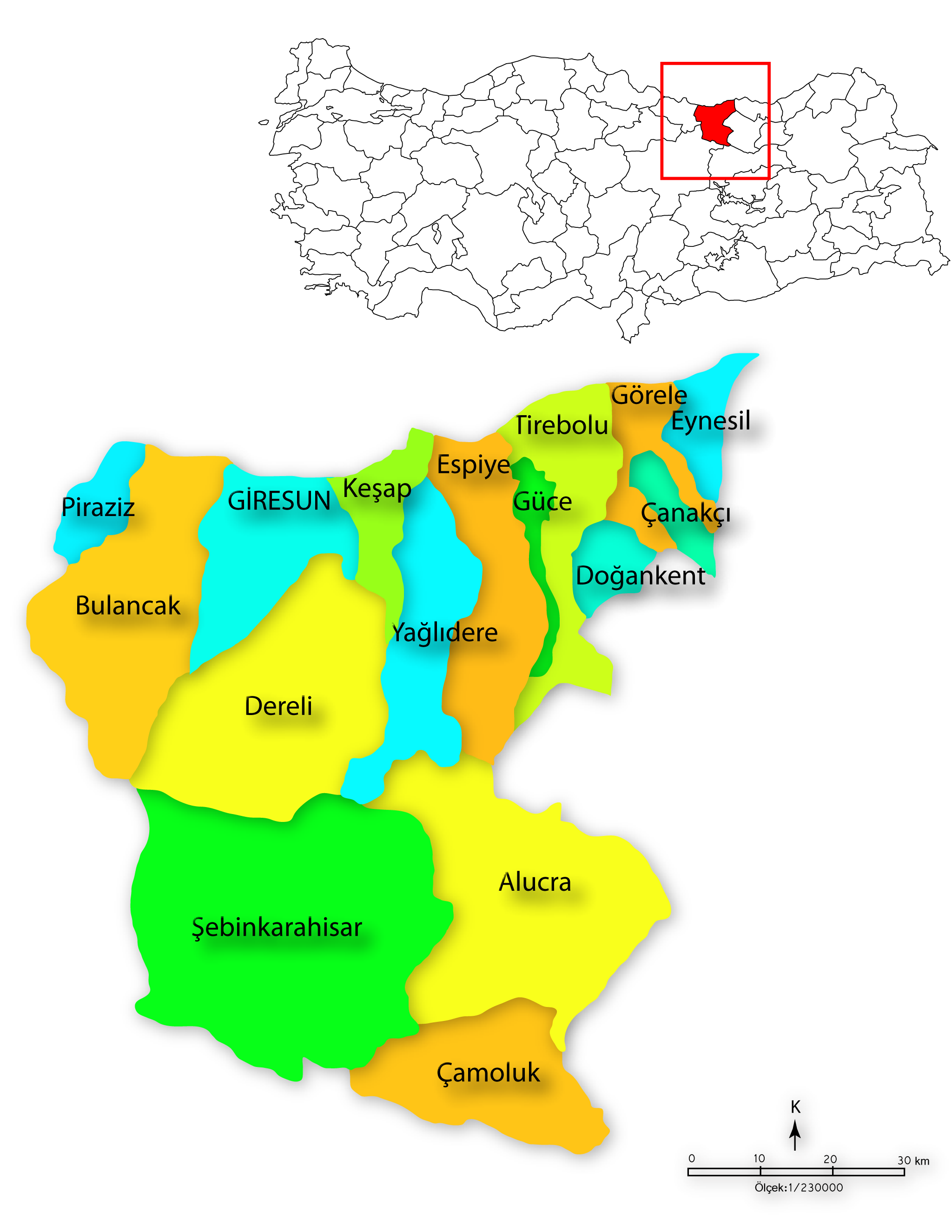
Districts of Giresun

The following population data is based on the 2024 census. The list is sorted from highest to lowest population. According to the results of the local elections of March 31, 2024, mayors are listed with their parties.

Giresun Province Population: 455,922

District	Population	Mayor	Party
Giresun (Merkez)	144,158	Fuat Köse	CHP
Bulancak	70,683	Necmi Sıbıç	CHP
Espiye	38,840	Erol Karadere	CHP
Tirebolu	32,720	Bülent Kara	İYİ Party
Görele	31,661	Hasbi Dede	CHP
Keşap	20,186	Tuncay Muhammet Arışan	AKP
Dereli	20,180	Kazım Zeki Şenlikoğlu	AKP
Şebinkarahisar	19,506	Ömer Şentürk	AKP
Yağlıdere	14,857	Yaşar İbaş	MHP
Piraziz	14,162	Mahmut Esat Ayyıldız	AKP
Eynesil	12,678	Barış Güdük	MHP
Alucra	9,025	Faruk Demirağ	AKP
Güce	8,303	Aytekin Boduroğlu	AKP
Doğankent	6,588	Rüşan Özden	AKP
Çamoluk	6,258	Ergün Bakırhan	AKP
Çanakçı	6,117	Tuncay Kasım	SP

==== Gümüşhane Province ====
(Entirely in the Black Sea Region)

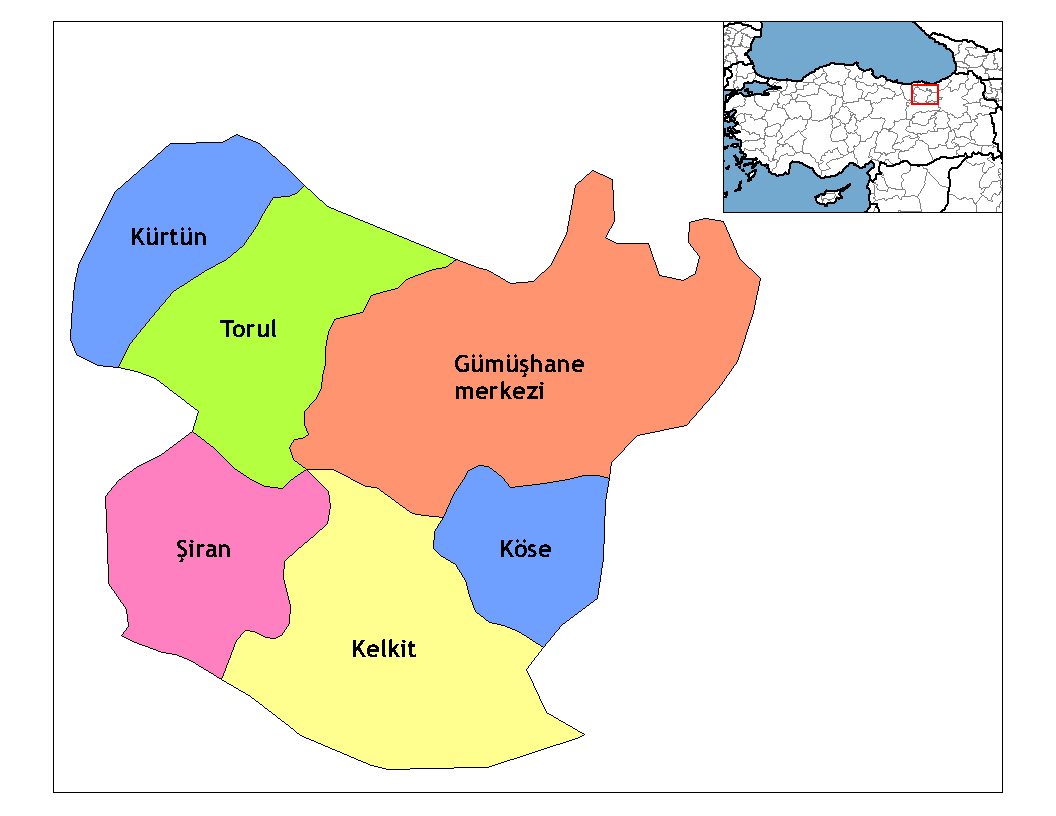
Districts of Gümüşhane

The following population data is based on the 2024 census. The list is sorted from highest to lowest population. According to the results of the local elections of March 31, 2024, mayors are listed with their parties.

Gümüşhane Province Population: 142,617

District	Population	Mayor	Party
Gümüşhane (Merkez)	54,341	Vedat Soner Başer	MHP
Kelkit	38,922	Ünal Yılmaz	AKP
Şiran	19,158	Abdulbaki Kara	DP
Kürtün	12,707	Ahmet Kanat	AKP
Torul	10,762	Evren Evrim Özdemir	MHP
Köse	6,727	Turgay Kesler	MHP

==== Karabük Province ====
(Entirely in the Black Sea Region)

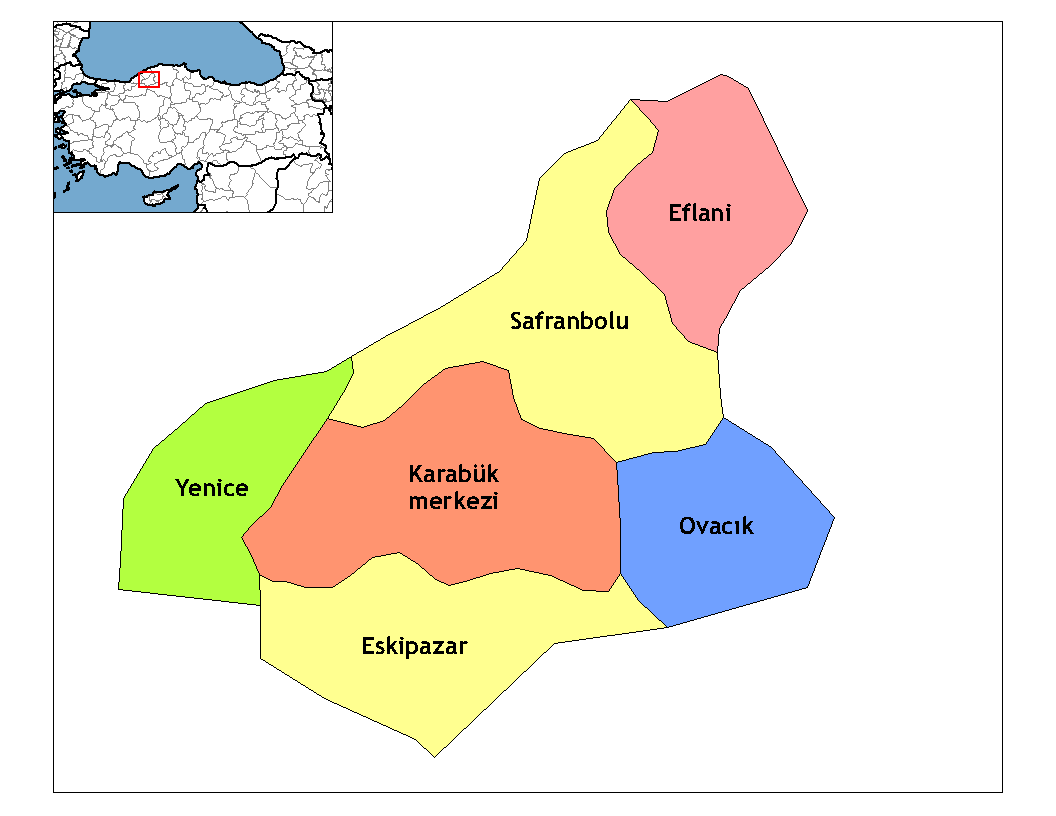
Districts of Karabük

The following population data is based on the 2024 census. The list is sorted from highest to lowest population. According to the results of the local elections of March 31, 2024, mayors are listed with their parties.

Karabük Province Population: 250,478

District	Mayor	Party
Karabük (Merkez)	Özkan Çetinkaya	AKP
Safranbolu	Elif Köse	CHP
Yenice	Şekip Sertaş Karakaş	AKP
Eskipazar	Serkan Cıva	AKP
Eflani	Hüsnü Akın	MHP
Ovacık	Ahmet Şahin	AKP

==== Kastamonu Province ====
(Entirely in the Black Sea Region)

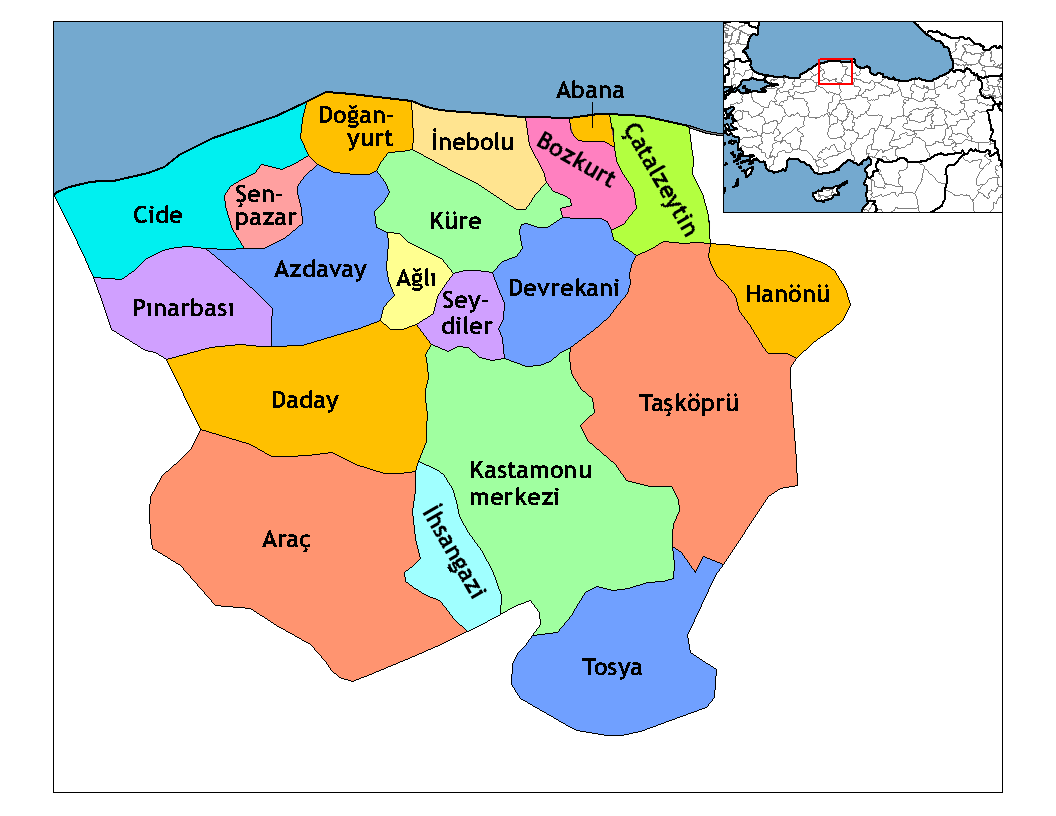
Districts of Kastamonu

The following population data is based on the 2024 census. The list is sorted from highest to lowest population. According to the results of the local elections of March 31, 2024, mayors are listed with their parties.

Kastamonu Province Population: 381,991

District	Population	Mayor	Party
Kastamonu (Merkez)	156,638	Hasan Baltacı	CHP
Tosya	39,401	Volkan Kavaklıgil	MHP
Taşköprü	37,196	Hüseyin Arslan	AKP
Cide	22,587	Nejdet Demir	MHP
İnebolu	20,036	Engin Uzuner	MHP
Araç	18,452	Süleyman Yazkan	AKP
Devrekani	12,544	Engin Altıkulaç	AKP
Bozkurt	9,425	Muammer Yanık	independent
Daday	7,992	Selahattin Yanık	CHP
Çatalzeytin	7,626	Ahmet Demir	MHP
Azdavay	7,462	Cevat Taşkan	MHP
Pınarbaşı	6,036	Serkan Arı	AKP
Küre	5,303	Salih Turan	AKP
Doğanyurt	5,173	Ahmet Kaya	AKP
İhsangazi	5,122	Hayati Sağlık	MHP
Seydiler	4,627	Mehmet Erdoğan	MHP
Abana	4,419	Seda Oyar	AKP
Şenpazar	4,380	Cem Çınar	AKP
Hanönü	4,322	Metin Yamalı	MHP
Ağlı	3,250	Bülent Ergin	AKP

==== Ordu Province ====
(Entirely in the Black Sea Region)

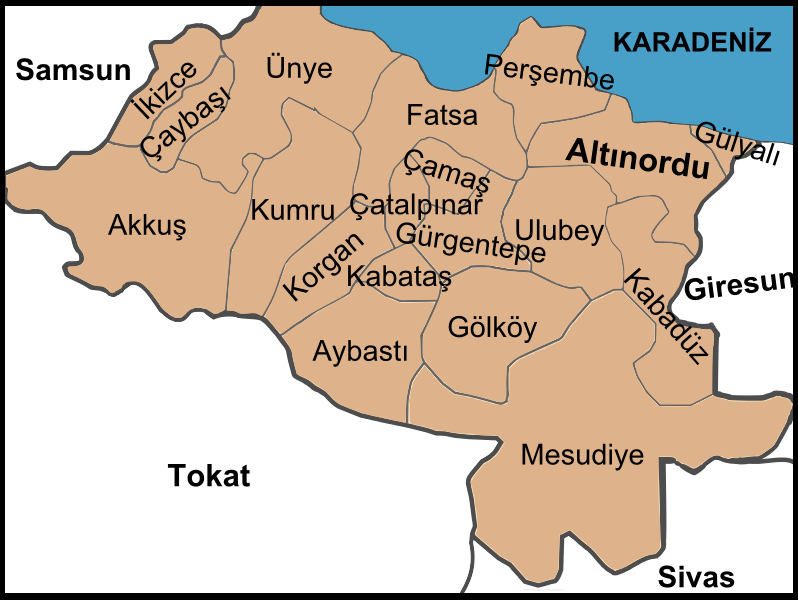
Districts of Ordu

The following population data is based on the 2024 census. The list is sorted from highest to lowest population. According to the results of the local elections of March 31, 2024, mayors are listed with their parties.

Ordu Province Population: 770,711

District	Population	Mayor	Party
Altınordu	234,628	Ulaş Tepe	CHP
Ünye	134,771	Hüseyin Tavlı	AKP
Fatsa	128,359	İbrahim Etem Kibar	AKP
Perşembe	30,558	Cihat Albayrak	AKP
Kumru	28,357	Yusuf Yalçuva	AKP
Korgan	27,250	Sait Korgan	İYİ Party
Gölköy	25,809	Fikri Uludağ	AKP
Akkuş	21,177	İsa Demirci	AKP
Aybastı	20,334	İzzet Gündoğar	AKP
Ulubey	19,289	İsa Türkcan	AKP
Gürgentepe	13,459	Cemil Çoşkun	CHP
İkizce	13,389	Osman Kaygı	MHP
Çatalpınar	13,260	Ahmet Özay	AKP
Mesudiye	12,944	Cengiz Koçyiğit	AKP
Çaybaşı	11,959	Mesut Karayiğit	Y.Refah Party
Kabataş	10,201	Bülent Güney	CHP
Çamaş	8,935	Leyla Çıtır	CHP
Gülyalı	8,837	Medet Sipahi	MHP
Kabadüz	7,195	Yener Kaya	AKP

==== Rize Province ====
(Entirely in the Black Sea Region)

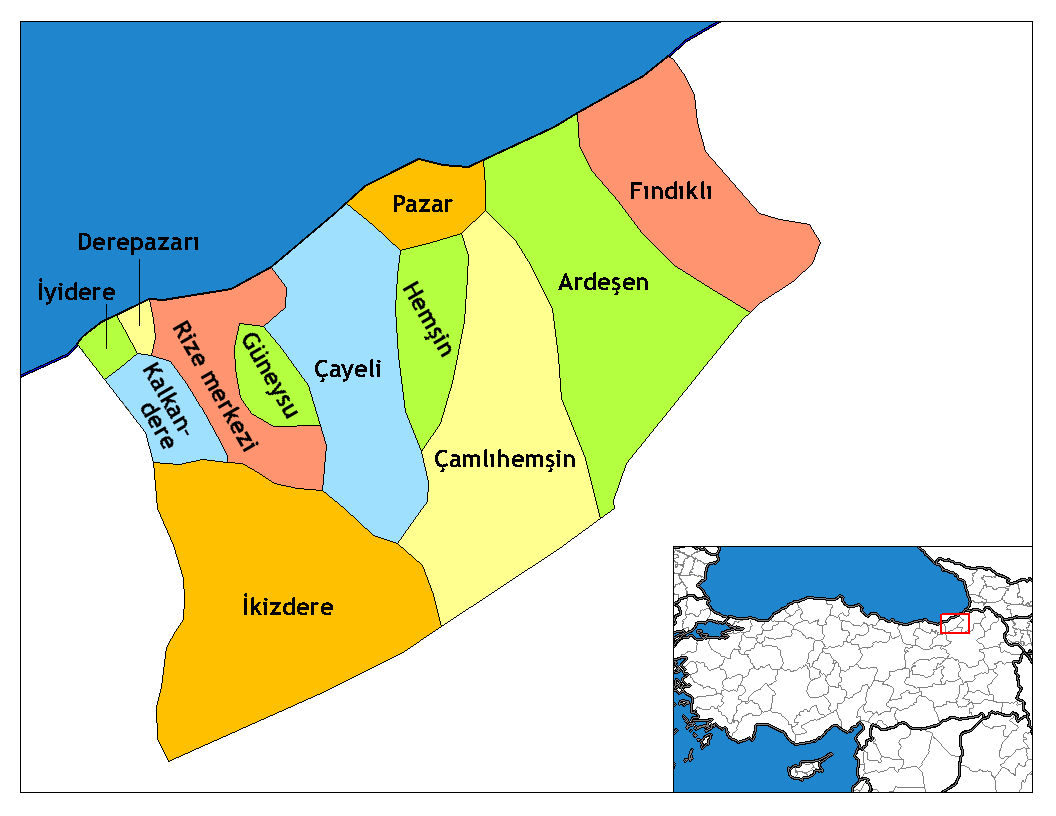
Districts of Rize

The following population data is based on the 2024 census. The list is sorted from highest to lowest population. According to the results of the local elections of March 31, 2024, mayors are listed with their parties.

Rize Province Population: 346,977

District	Population	Mayor	Party
Rize (Merkez)	151,617	Rahmi Metin	AKP
Ardeşen	43,418	Enver Atagün	CHP
Çayeli	42,208	İsmail Hakkı Çiftçi	MHP
Pazar	31,776	Neşet Çakır	CHP
Fındıklı	16,677	Ercüment Şahin Çervatoğlu	CHP
Güneysu	15,198	Rıfat Özer	AKP
Kalkandere	13,788	Mehmet Yılmaz	AKP
İyidere	8,635	Saffet Mete	AKP
Çamlıhemşin	7,361	Ömer Altun	AKP
İkizdere	6,939	Abdi Ekşi	AKP
Derepazarı	6,938	Şaban Kalça	AKP
Hemşin	2,422	Halim Kazim Bekar	AKP

==== Samsun Province ====
(Entirely in the Black Sea Region)

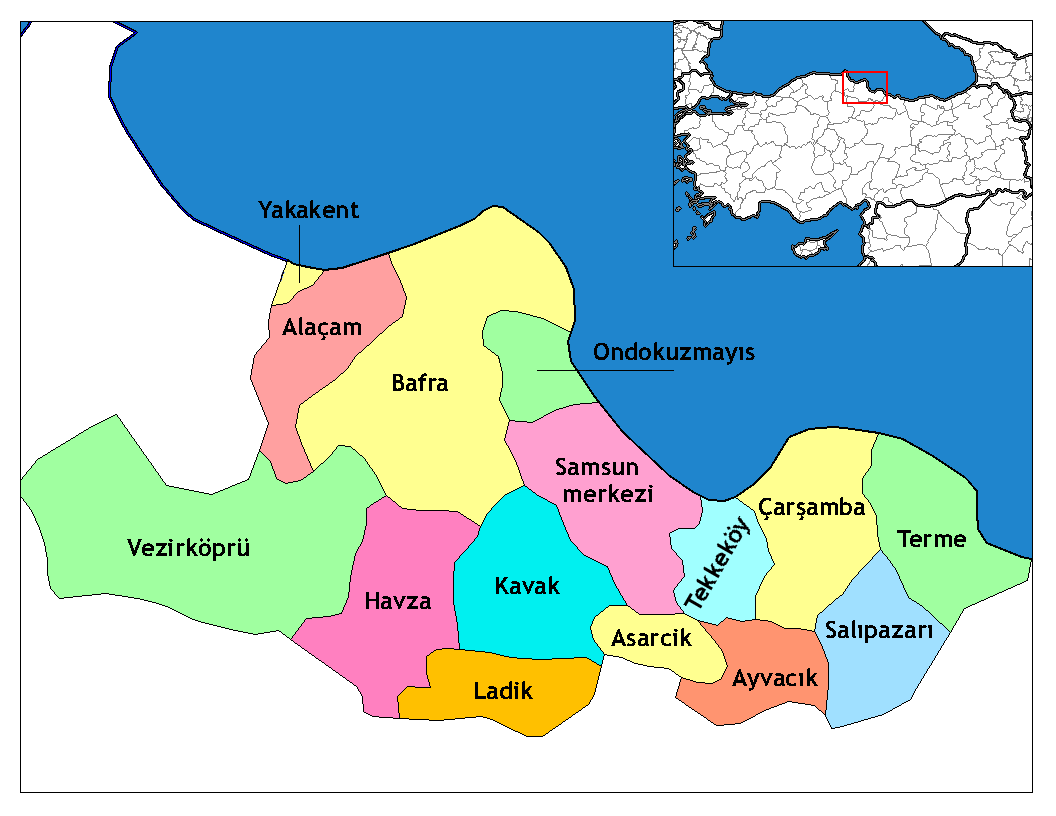
Districts of Samsun

The following population data is based on the 2024 census. The list is sorted from highest to lowest population. According to the results of the local elections of March 31, 2024, mayors are listed with their parties.

Samsun Province Population: 1,382,376

District	Population	Mayor	Party
İlkadım	325,775	İhsan Kurnaz	AKP
Atakum	253,437	Serhat Türkel	CHP
Bafra	143,600	Hamit Kılıç	AKP
Çarşamba	141,850	Hüseyin Dündar	Independent
Canik	100,591	İbrahim Sandıkçı	AKP
Vezirköprü	88,564	Murat Gül	AKP
Terme	71,720	Şenol Kul	AKP
Tekkeköy	58,889	Mustafa Candal	AKP
Havza	38,493	Murat İkiz	AKP
19 Mayıs	28,318	Osman Topaloğlu	AKP
Kavak	25,469	Şerif Ün	Y.Refah Party
Alaçam	24,686	Ramazan Özdemir	MHP
Salıpazarı	20,046	Refaettin Karaca	BBP
Ayvacık	19,556	Refahittin Şencan	Y.Refah Party
Ladik	16,309	Adnan Topal	Y.Refah Party
Asarcık	16,128	Şerif Kılağuz	MHP
Yakakent	8,945	Şerafettin Aydoğdu	İYİ Parti

==== Sinop Province ====
(Entirely in the Black Sea Region)

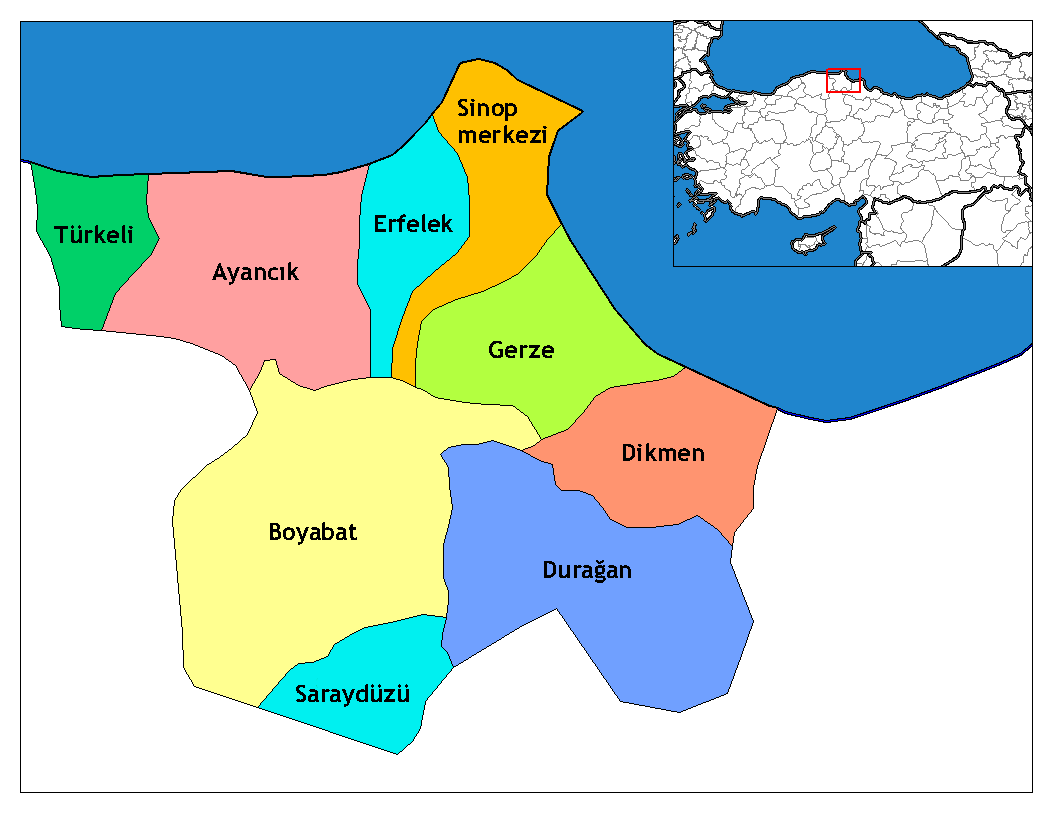
Districts of Sinop

The following population data is based on the 2024 census. The list is sorted from highest to lowest population. According to the results of the local elections of March 31, 2024, mayors are listed with their parties.

Sinop Province Population: 226,957

District	Population	Mayor	Party
Sinop (Merkez)	70,051	Metin Gürbüz	CHP
Boyabat	45,494	Hasan Kara	Yeniden Refah Party
Gerze	30,100	Osman Belovacıklı	CHP
Ayancık	24,013	Hayrettin Kaya	CHP
Durağan	17,151	Necmettin Ermiş	AKP
Türkeli	16,635	Veysel Şahin	AKP
Erfelek	12,795	Mehmet Uzun	AKP
Saraydüzü	5,867	Ferdi Canoğlu	MHP
Dikmen	4,851	Adnan Acar	AKP

==== Tokat Province ====
(Entirely in the Black Sea Region)

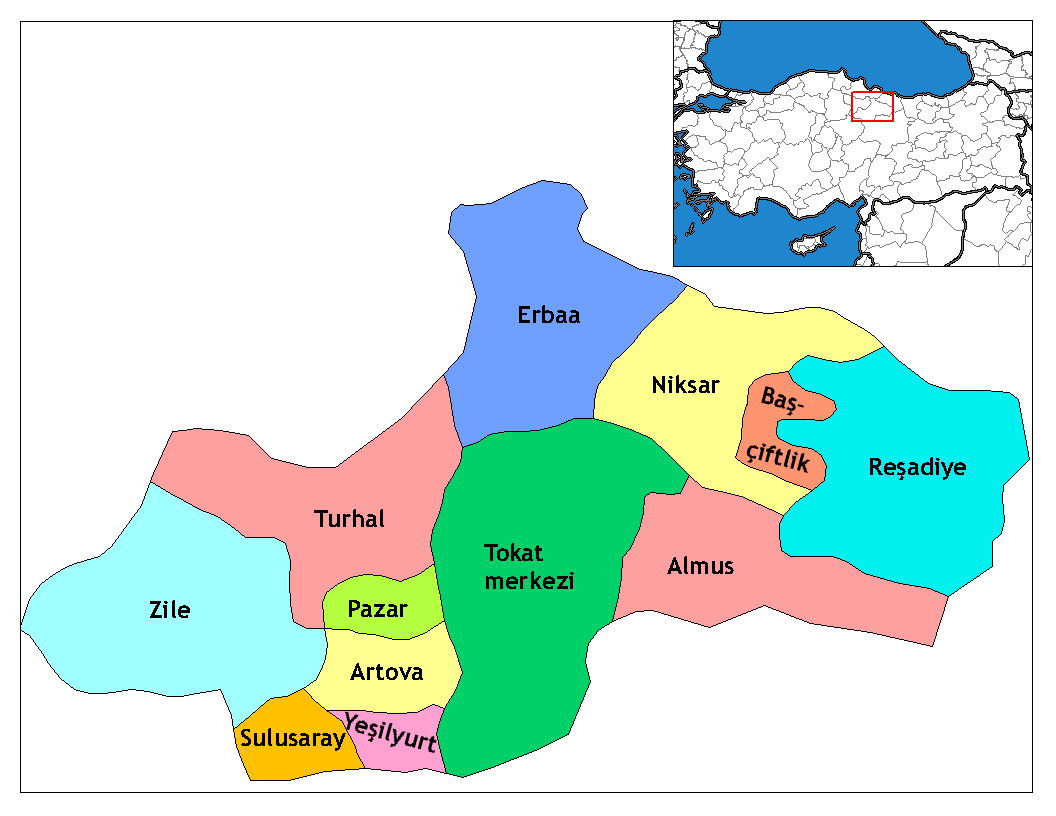
Districts of Tokat

The following population data is based on the 2024 census. The list is sorted from highest to lowest population. According to the results of the local elections of March 31, 2024, mayors are listed with their parties.

Tokat Province Population: 612,674

District	Population	Mayor	Party
Tokat (Merkez)	201,231	Mehmet Kemal Yazıcıoğlu	MHP
Erbaa	101,568	Ertuğrul Karagöl	MHP
Turhal	78,101	Mehmet Erdem Ural	CHP
Niksar	64,204	Semih Tepebaşı	AKP
Zile	53,668	Şükrü Sargın	CHP
Reşadiye	41,952	Ergül Ünal	MHP
Almus	27,764	Bekir Özer	MHP
Pazar	12,992	Şerafettin Pervanlar	MHP
Başçiftlik	8,508	Şaban Bolat	AKP
Yeşilyurt	8,213	Muhsin Yılmaz	MHP
Artova	7,593	Ali Güner	AKP
Sulusaray	6,880	Davut Kılıç	MHP

==== Trabzon Province ====
(Entirely in the Black Sea Region)

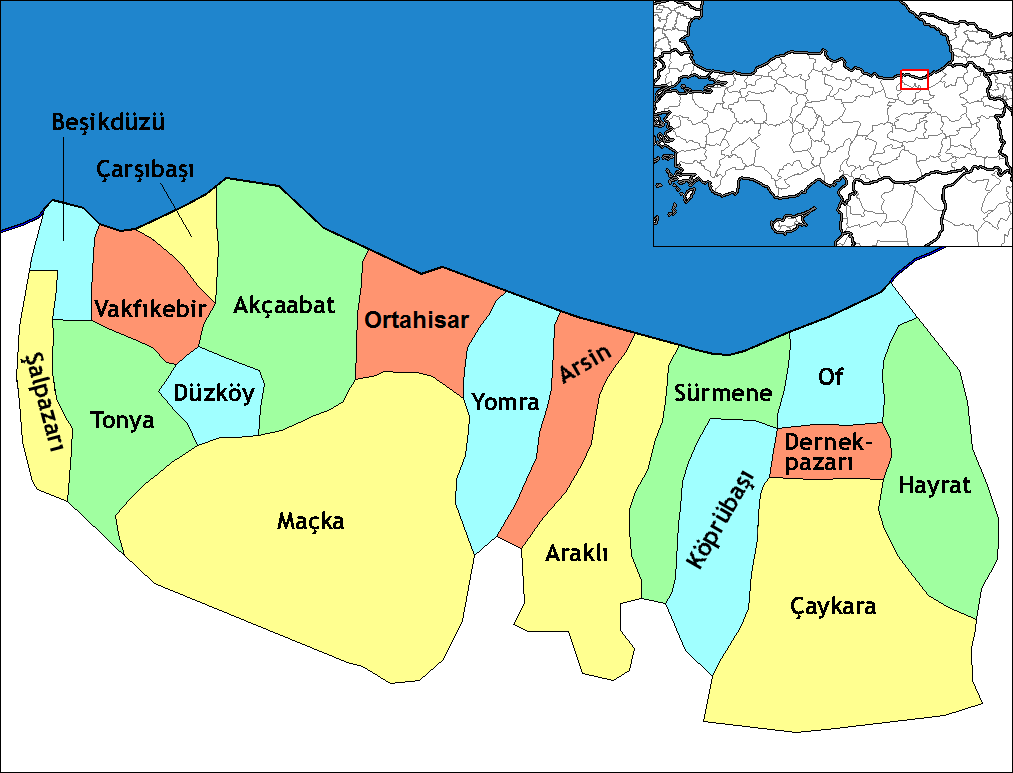
Districts of Trabzon

The following population data is based on the 2024 census. The list is sorted from highest to lowest population. According to the results of the local elections of March 31, 2024, mayors are listed with their parties.

Trabzon Province Population: 822,270

District	Population	Mayor	Party
Ortahisar	330,836	Ahmet Kaya	CHP
Akçaabat	130,585	Osman Nuri Ekim	AKP
Yomra	50,339	Mustafa Bıyık	İYİ Party
Araklı	49,627	Hüseyin Avni Coşkun Çebi	AKP
Of	43,879	Salim Salih Sarıalioğlu	AKP
Arsin	31,709	Hamza Bilgin	Y.Refah Party
Vakfıkebir	27,219	Ahmet İhsan Hacıfettahoğlu	Independent
Sürmene	25,535	Hüseyin Azizoğlu	AKP
Maçka	25,472	Koray Koçhan	AKP
Beşikdüzü	23,367	Burhan Cahit Erdem	CHP
Çarşıbaşı	15,229	Ahmet Keleş	MHP
Tonya	13,785	Osman Beşel	AKP
Çaykara	13,674	Hanefi Tok	AKP
Düzköy	13,451	Selim Çelenk	AKP
Şalpazarı	11,161	Refik Kurukız	MHP
Hayrat	7,916	Mehmet Nuhoğlu	AKP
Köprübaşı	4,527	Ali Aydın	AKP
Dernekpazarı	3,959	Mehmet Aşık	AKP

==== Zonguldak Province ====
(Entirely in the Black Sea Region)

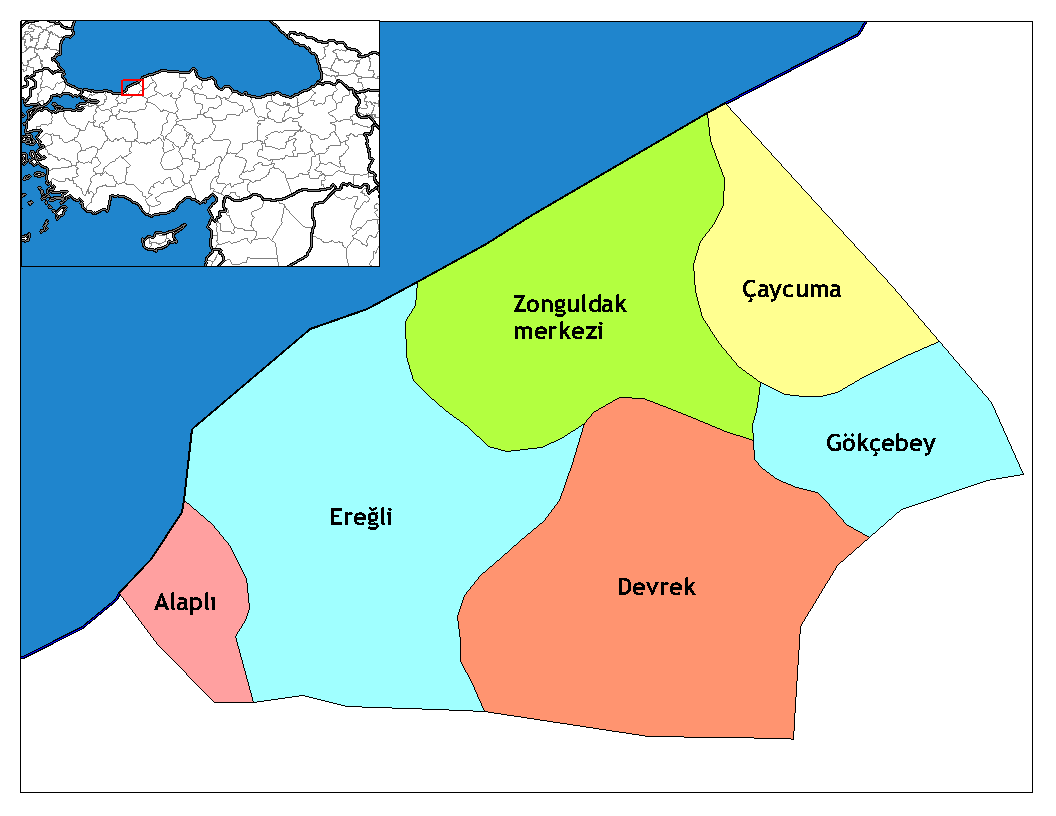
Districts of Zonguldak

The following population data is based on the 2024 census. The list is sorted from highest to lowest population. According to the results of the local elections of March 31, 2024, mayors are listed with their parties.

Zonguldak Province Population: 586,802

District	Population	Mayor	Party
Ereğli	174,468	Halil Posbıyık	CHP
Merkez	116,325	Tahsin Erdem	CHP
Çaycuma	90,423	Bülent Kantarcı	CHP
Devrek	57,328	Özcan Ulupınar	AKP
Kozlu	50,820	Altuğ Dökmeci	CHP
Alaplı	43,168	Nuri Tekin	AKP
Kilimli	33,002	Kamil Altun	AKP
Gökçebey	21,268	Vedat Öztürk	CHP

=== Marmara Region ===
==== Balıkesir Province ====
(Mostly in the Marmara Region)

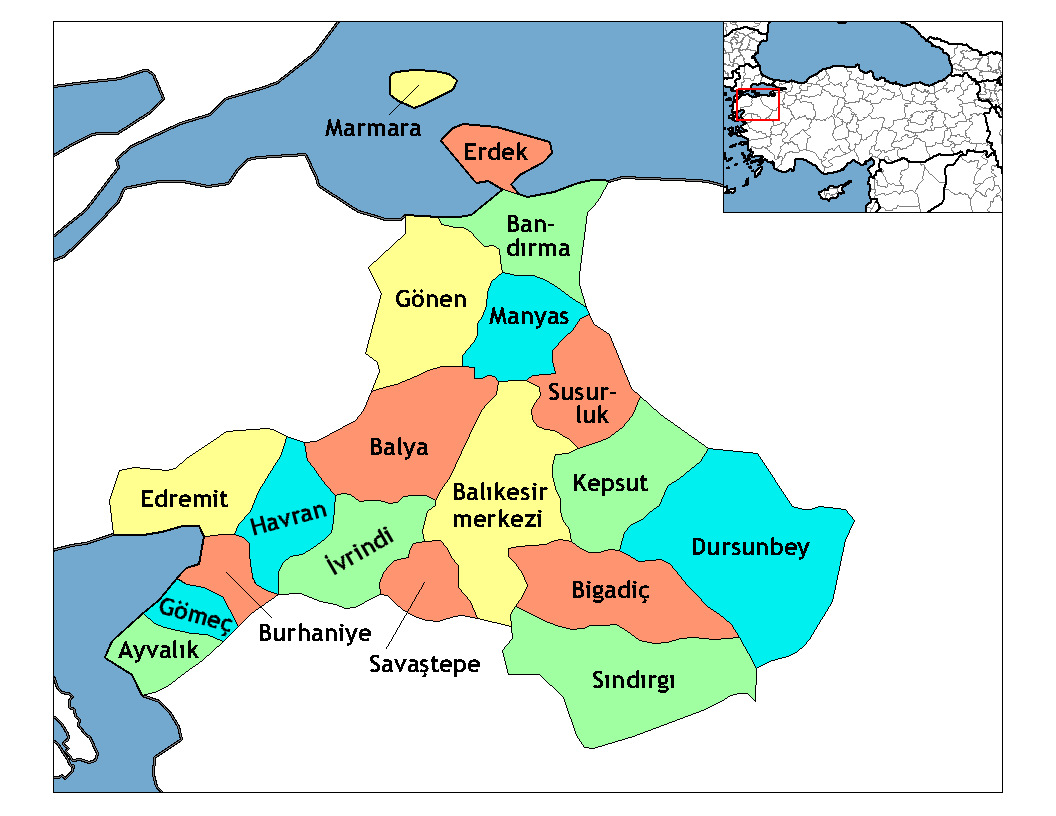
Districts of Balıkesir

The following population data is based on the 2024 census. The list is sorted from highest to lowest population. According to the results of the local elections of March 31, 2024, mayors are listed with their parties.

Balıkesir Province Population: 1,276,096

District	Population	Mayor	Party
Karesi	190,427	Mesut Akbıyık	CHP
Altıeylül	185,351	Hakan Şehirli	CHP
Edremit	173,689	Mehmet Ertaş	New Party
Bandırma	167,363	Dursun Mirza	New Party
Ayvalık	75,126	Mesut Ergin	New Party
Gönen	75,486	İbrahim Palaz	New Party
Gömeç	75,486	Melih Bağcı	New Party
Burhaniye	67,039	Ali Kemal Deveciler	New Party
Bigadiç	48,445	Mustafa Göksel	AKP
Susurluk	37,750	Hakan Yıldırım Semizel	New Party
Dursunbey	32,778	Ramazan Bahçavan	AKP
Erdek	32,021	Burhan Karışık	New Party
Sındırgı	32,133	Serkan Sak	New Party
İvrindi	31,386	Önder Lapanta	İYİ Party
Havran	28,107	Emin Ersoy	AKP
Kepsut	21,886	İsmail Cankul	AKP
Balya	12,695	Orhan Gaga	New Party
Manyas	17,890	Ahmet Duru	New Party
Savaştepe	16,547	Ali Koyuncu	CHP
Marmara	11,708	Aydın Dinçer	New Party

==== Bilecik Province ====
(Mostly in the Marmara Region)

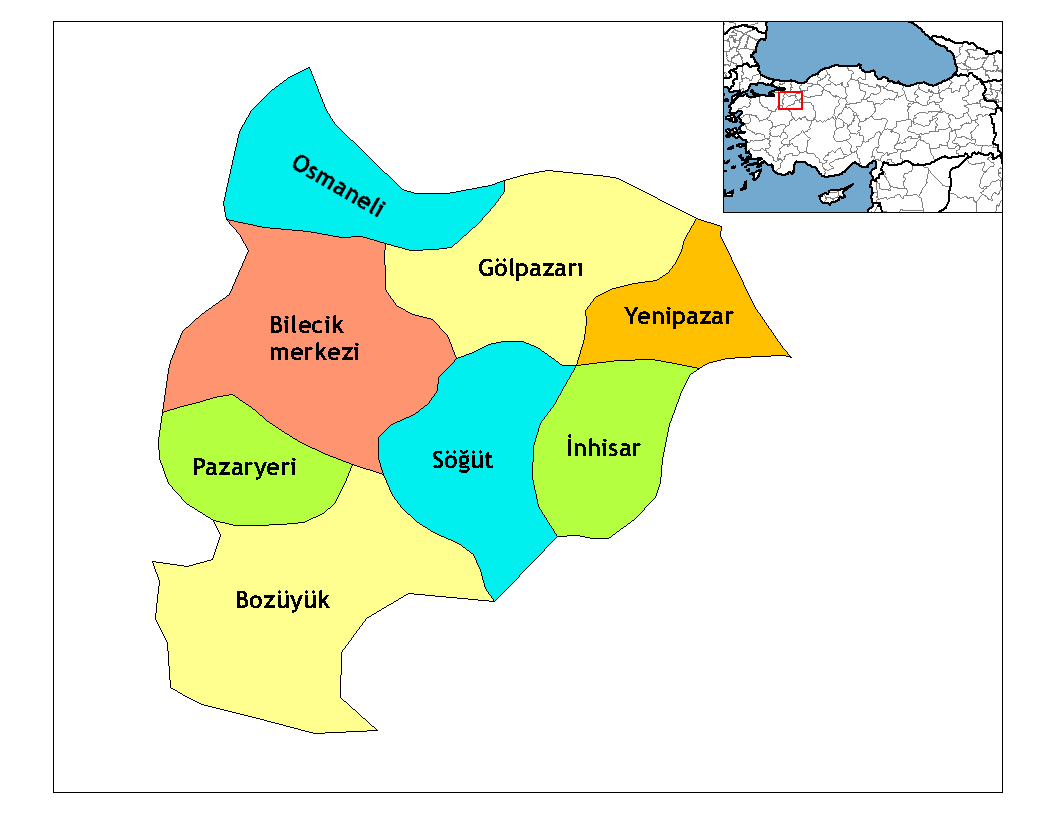
Districts of Bilecik

The following population data is based on the 2024 census. The list is sorted from highest to lowest population. According to the results of the local elections of March 31, 2024, mayors are listed with their parties.

Bilecik Province Population: 228,495

District	Population	Mayor	Party
Bilecik (Merkez)	82,403	Melek Mızrak Subaşı	CHP
Bozüyük	80,865	Mehmet Talat Bakkalcıoğlu	CHP
Osmaneli	21,931	Bekir Torun	İYİ Party
Söğüt	18,665	Ferhat Durgut	MHP
Gölpazarı	9,910	Hayri Suer	AKP
Pazaryeri	9,778	Zekiye Tekin	AKP
Yenipazar	2,775	İlhan Özden	MHP
İnhisar	2,168	Nihal Arslan	AKP

==== Bursa Province ====
(Mostly in the Marmara Region)

Districts of Bursa

The following population data is based on the 2024 census. The list is sorted from highest to lowest population. According to the results of the local elections of March 31, 2024, mayors are listed with their parties.

Bursa Province Population: 3,238,618

District	Population	Mayor	Party
Osmangazi	885,441	Erkan Aydın	AKP
Yıldırım	654,998	Oktay Yılmaz	AKP
Nilüfer	561,730	Şadi Özdemir	CHP
İnegöl	302,251	Alper Taban	AKP
Gemlik	123,361	Şükrü Deviren	CHP
Mudanya	110,797	Deniz Dalgıç	CHP
Gürsu	104,867	Mustafa Işık	AKP
Mustafakemalpaşa	103,581	Şükrü Erdem	CHP
Karacabey	85,968	Fatih Karabatı	İYİ Party
Orhangazi	82,111	Bekir Aydın	AKP
Kestel	76,659	Ferhat Erol	AKP
Yenişehir	55,606	Ercan Özel	İYİ Party
İznik	45,208	Kağan Mehmet Usta	AKP
Orhaneli	19,069	Ali Osman Tayır	AKP
Keles	11,171	Ali Doğru	AKP
Büyükorhan	9,596	Kamil Turhan	AKP
Harmancık	6,204	Haşim Ali Arıkan	CHP

==== Çanakkale Province ====
(Mostly in the Marmara Region)

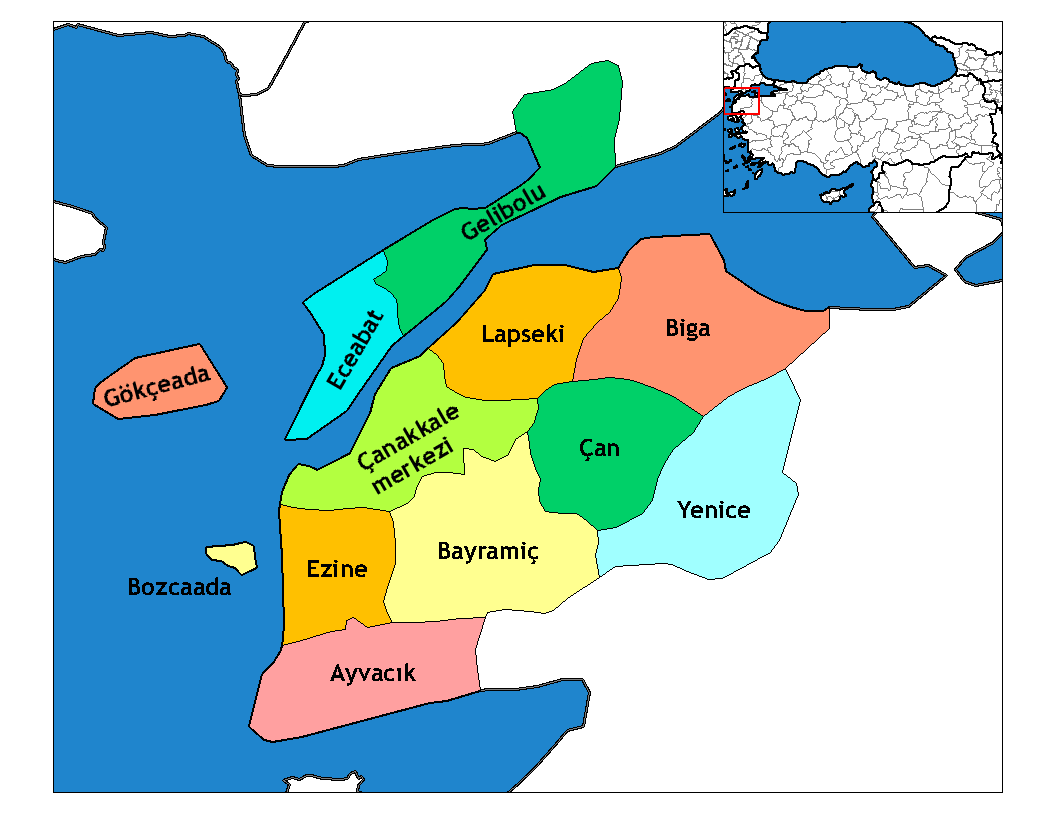
Districts of Çanakkale

The following population data is based on the 2024 census. The list is sorted from highest to lowest population. According to the results of the local elections of March 31, 2024, mayors are listed with their parties.

Çanakkale Province Population: 568,966

District	Population	Mayor	Party
Çanakkale (Merkez)	204,454	Muharrem Erkek	CHP
Biga	94,112	Alper Şen	CHP
Çan	46,920	Harun Arslan	CHP
Gelibolu	44,174	Ali Kamil Soyuak	AKP
Ayvacık	35,088	Mesut Bayram	AKP
Ezine	31,811	Güray Yüksel	AKP
Lapseki	30,497	Atilla Öztürk	İYİ Party
Yenice	29,833	Veysel Acar	AKP
Bayramiç	28,741	Hasan Cem Atılgan	CHP
Gökçeada	11,145	Bülent Ecevit Atalay	CHP
Eceabat	8,828	Saim Zileli	CHP
Bozcaada	3,363	Yahya Göztepe	CHP

==== Edirne Province ====
(Entirely in the Marmara Region)

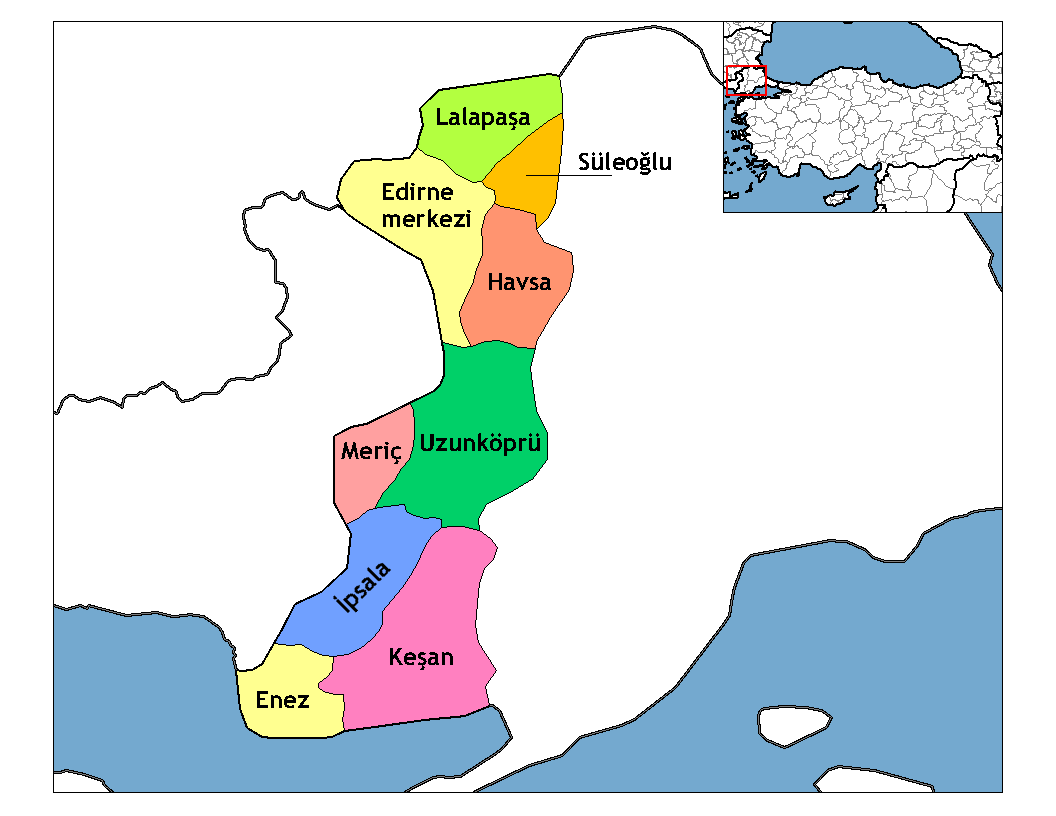
Districts of Edirne

The following population data is based on the 2024 census. The list is sorted from highest to lowest population. According to the results of the local elections of March 31, 2024, mayors are listed with their parties.

Edirne Province Population: 421,247

District	Population	Mayor	Party
Merkez	198,428	Filiz Gencan Akın	CHP
Keşan	84,791	Mehmet Özcan	CHP
Uzunköprü	59,457	Ediz Martin	İYİ Parti
İpsala	25,645	Mehmet Kerman	AKP
Havsa	17,716	Hüseyin Özden	CHP
Meriç	12,548	Yunus Atay	AKP
Enez	10,529	Özkan Günenç	CHP
Süloğlu	6,068	Mehmet Ormankıran	CHP
Lalapaşa	6,065	Zafer Sezgin Geldi	CHP

==== Istanbul Province ====
(Entirely in the Marmara Region)

Districts of Istanbul

The following population data is based on the 2024 census. The list is sorted from highest to lowest population. According to the results of the local elections of March 31, 2024, mayors are listed with their parties.

Istanbul Province Population: 15,701,602

District	Population	Mayor	Party
Esenyurt	988,369	Ahmet Özer	CHP
Küçükçekmece	789,033	Kemal Çebi	CHP
Pendik	749,356	Şadİ Yazıcı	AKP
Ümraniye	727,819	İsmet Yıldırım	AKP
Bağcılar	713,594	Abdullah Özdemir	AKP
Bahçelievler	560,086	Hakan Bahadır	AKP
Sultangazi	532,601	Abdurrahman Dursun	AKP
Maltepe	524,921	Ali Kılıç	CHP
Başakşehir	520,467	Yasin Kartoğlu	AKP
Üsküdar	512,981	Hilmi Türkmen	CHP
Sancaktepe	502,077	Şeyma Döğücü	CHP
Gaziosmanpaşa	479,931	Hasan Tahsin Usta	CHP
Kartal	475,859	Gökhan Yüksel	CHP
Kadıköy	462,189	Şerdil Dara Odabaşı	CHP
Kağıthane	444,820	Mevlüt Öztekin	AKP
Avcılar	440,934	Utku Caner Çaykara	CHP
Esenler	423,625	Mehmet Tevfik Göksu	AKP
Eyüpsultan	420,706	Mithat Bülent Özmen	CHP
Beylikdüzü	415,290	Mehmet Murat Çalık	CHP
Ataşehir	414,866	Onursal Adıgüzel	CHP
Sultanbeyli	369,193	Hüseyin Keskin	AKP
Fatih	354,472	Mehmet Ergün Turan	AKP
Arnavutköy	344,868	Mustafa Candaroğlu	AKP
Sarıyer	342,582	Şükrü Genç	CHP
Çekmeköy	306,739	Orhan Çerkez	CHP
Tuzla	301,400	Şadi Yazıcı	CHP
Büyükçekmece	280,528	Hasan Akgün	CHP
Zeytinburnu	278,344	Ömer Arısoy	AKP
Bayrampaşa	268,303	Hasan Mutlu	CHP
Güngören	264,831	Şakir Yıldız	AKP
Şişli	263,063	Muammer Keskin	CHP
Beykoz	245,440	Alaattin Köseler	CHP
Silivri	232,156	Volkan Yılmaz	CHP
Bakırköy	219,893	Ayşegül Özdemir Ovalıoğlu	CHP
Beyoğlu	216,688	İnan Güney	CHP
Beşiktaş	167,264	Rıza Akpolat	CHP
Çatalca	80,399	Erhan Güzel	CHP
Şile	48,936	Can Tabakoğlu	CHP
Adalar	16,979	Ali Ercan Akpolat	CHP

==== Kırklareli Province ====
(Entirely in the Marmara Region)

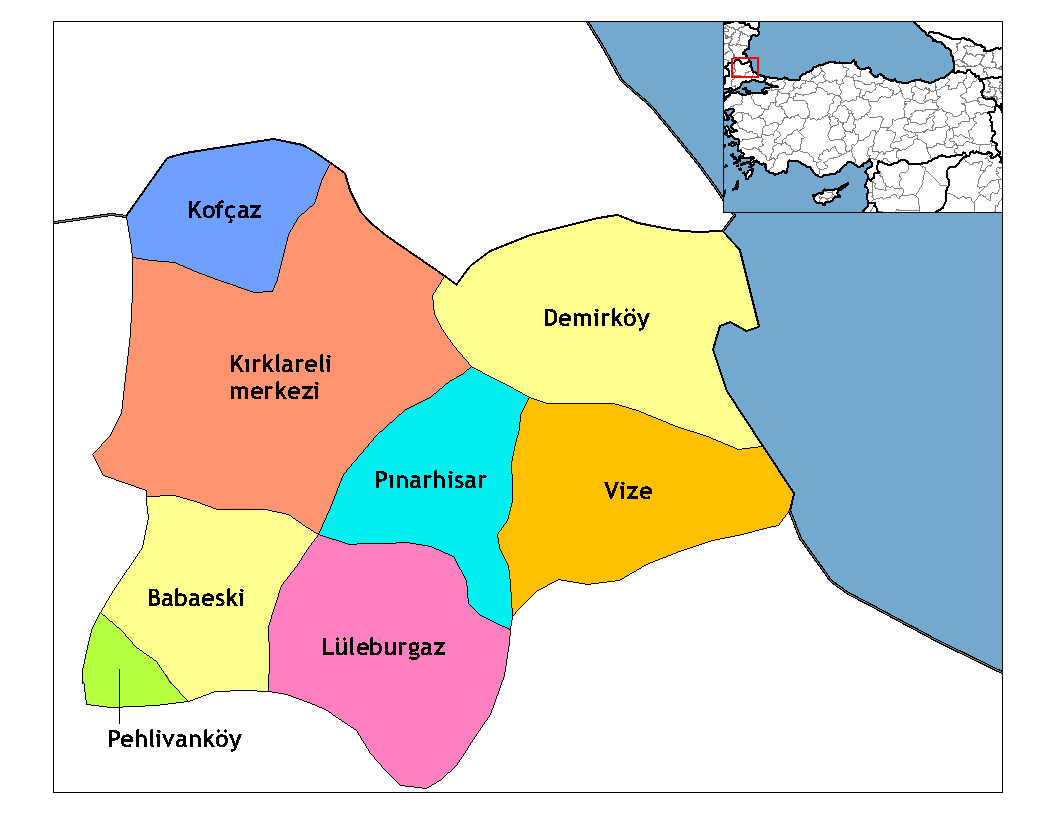
Districts of Kırklareli

The following population data is based on the 2024 census. The list is sorted from highest to lowest population. According to the results of the local elections of March 31, 2024, mayors are listed with their parties.

Kırklareli Province Population: 379,031

District	Population	Mayor	Party
Lüleburgaz	156,648	Murat Gerenli	CHP
Kırklareli (Merkez)	114,800	Derya Bulut	MHP
Babaeski	46,656	Fırat Yayla	AKP
Vize	29,024	Ercan Özalp	CHP
Pınarhisar	17,499	İhsan Talay	AKP
Demirköy	8,970	Recep Gün	AKP
Pehlivanköy	3,278	Gündüz Hoşgör	AKP
Kofçaz	2,156	Levent Şenol	MHP

==== Kocaeli Province ====
(Mostly in the Marmara Region)

Districts of Kocaeli

The following population data is based on the 2024 census. The list is sorted from highest to lowest population. According to the results of the local elections of March 31, 2024, mayors are listed with their parties.

Kocaeli Province Population: 2,130,006

District	Population	Mayor	Party
Gebze	411,800	Zinnur Büyükgöz	AKP
İzmit	380,831	Fatma Kaplan Hürriyet	CHP
Darıca	231,442	Muzaffer Bıyık	AKP
Körfez	181,666	Şener Söğüt	AKP
Gölcük	178,872	Ali Yıldırım Sezer	AKP
Çayırova	157,503	Bünyamin Çiftçi	AKP
Kartepe	147,814	Muhammet Mustafa Kocaman	AKP
Derince	147,518	Sertif Gökçe	CHP
Başiskele	124,998	Mehmet Yasin Özlü	AKP
Karamürsel	59,504	Ahmet Çalık	CHP
Dilovası	54,664	Ramazan Ömeroğlu	AKP
Kandıra	53,394	Erol Ölmez	AKP

==== Sakarya Province ====
(Mostly in the Marmara Region)

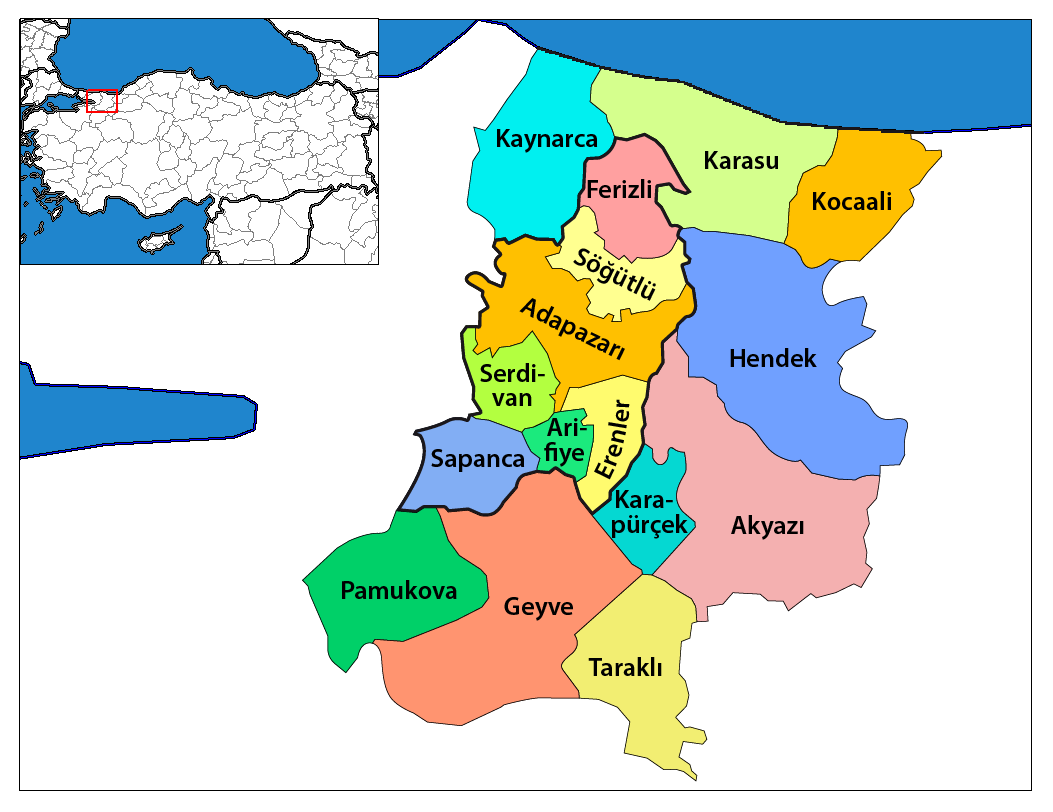
Districts of Sakarya

The following population data is based on the 2024 census. The list is sorted from highest to lowest population. According to the results of the local elections of March 31, 2024, mayors are listed with their parties.

Sakarya Province Population: 1,110,735

District	Population	Mayor	Party
Adapazarı	282,078	Mutlu Işıksu	AKP
Serdivan	166,321	Osman Çelik	AKP
Akyazı	98,098	Bilal Soykan	AKP
Hendek	92,729	İrfan Püsküllü	BBP
Erenler	92,463	Şenol Dinç	BBP
Karasu	74,548	İshak Sarı	Y. Refah
Arifiye	52,979	İsmail Karakullukçu	AKP
Geyve	51,751	Selçuk Yıldız	Y. Refah
Sapanca	46,847	Nihat Arda Şahin	CHP
Ferizli	35,163	Mehmet Ata	İYİ Parti
Pamukova	31,330	Fatih Akın	AKP
Kaynarca	25,256	Kadir Yazgan	Y. Refah
Kocaali	25,080	Turan Yüzücü	AKP
Söğütlü	15,366	Selçuk Kurt	AKP
Karapürçek	13,726	Mehmet Murat Çoruhlu	AKP
Taraklı	7,000	İbrahim Pilavcı	MHP

==== Tekirdağ Province ====
(Entirely in the Marmara Region)

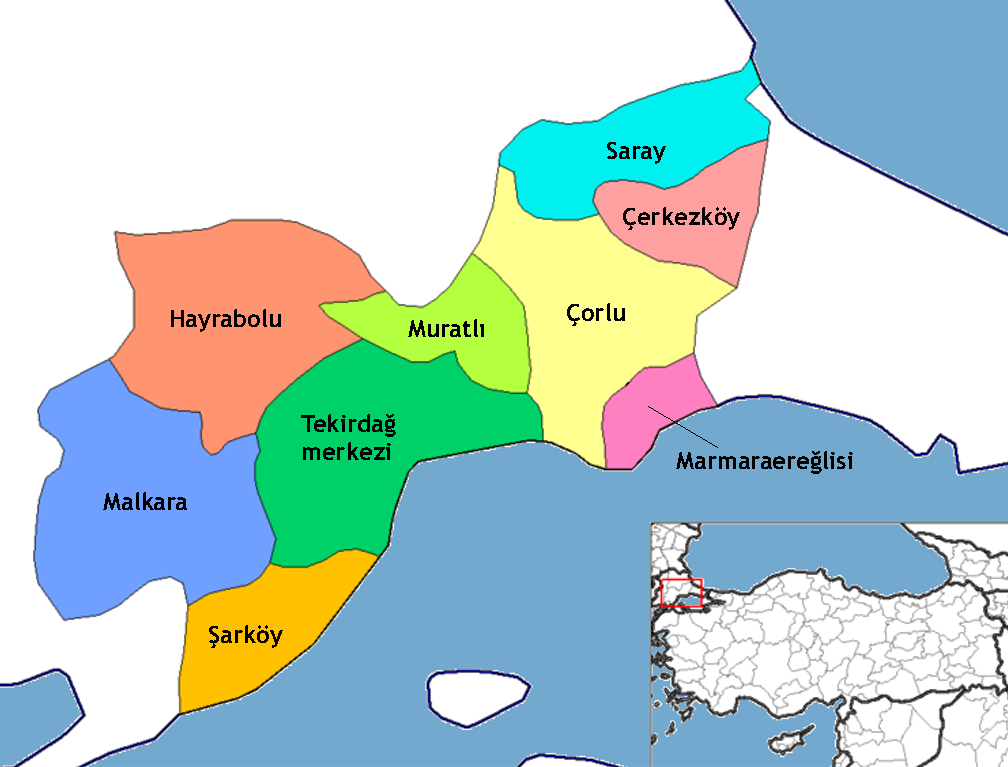
Districts of Tekirdağ

The following population data is based on the 2024 census. The list is sorted from highest to lowest population. According to the results of the local elections of March 31, 2024, mayors are listed with their parties.

Tekirdağ Province Population: 1,187,162

District	Population	Mayor	Party
Çorlu	300,296	Ahmet Sarıkurt	CHP
Süleymanpaşa	223,068	Volkan Nallar	CHP
Çerkezköy	218,926	Vahap Akay	CHP
Kapaklı	147,610	Mustafa Çetin	AKP
Ergene	68,526	Müge Yıldız Topak	AKP
Saray	51,275	Abdül Taşyasan	CHP
Malkara	50,727	Nergiz Karaağaçlı Öztürk	CHP
Şarköy	34,091	Alpay Var	CHP
Marmaraereğlisi	32,104	Mustafa Onur Bozkurter	CHP
Muratlı	30,455	Varol Türel	CHP
Hayrabolu	30,084	Tuncer Başoğlu	CHP

==== Yalova Province ====
(Entirely in the Marmara Region)

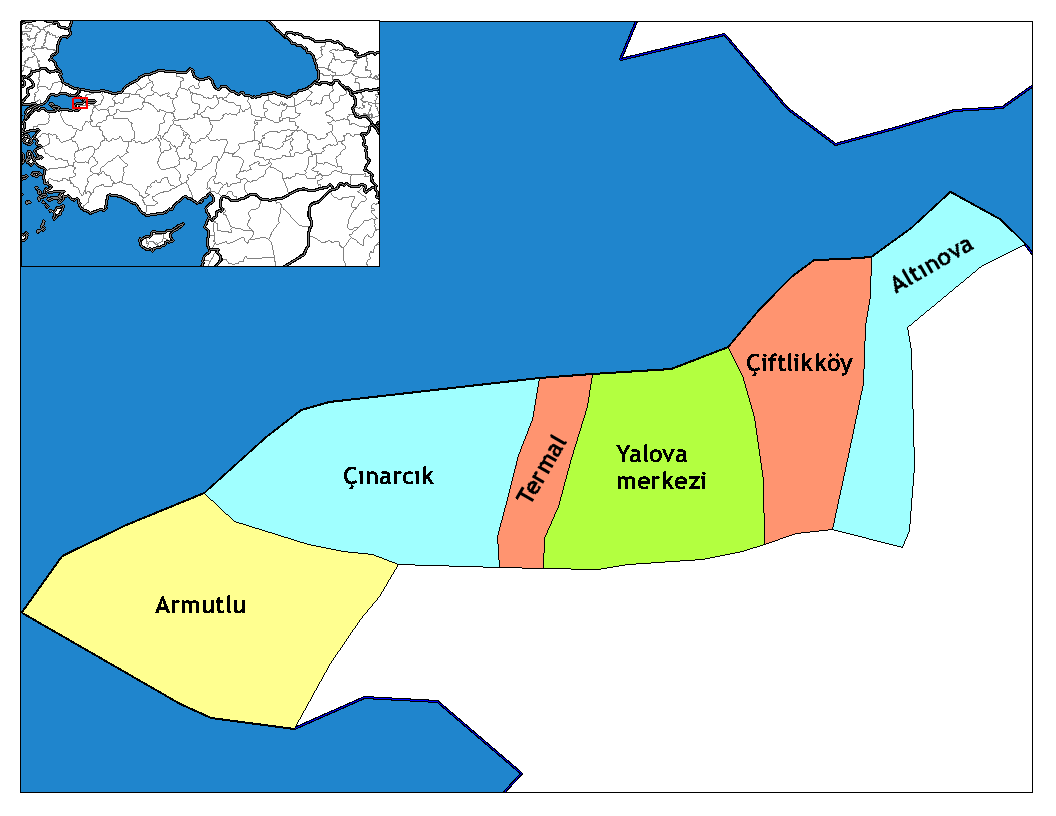
Districts of Yalova

The following population data is based on the 2024 census. The list is sorted from highest to lowest population. According to the results of the local elections of March 31, 2024, mayors are listed with their parties.

Yalova Province Population: 307,882

District	Population	Mayor	Party
Yalova (Merkez)	157,499	Mehmet Gürel	CHP
Çiftlikköy	56,387	Adil Yele	CHP
Çınarcık	40,632	Avni Kurt	CHP
Altınova	34,090	Yasemin Fazlaca	CHP
Armutlu	11,827	Cengiz Arslan	AKP
Termal	7,447	Hüseyin Sinan Acar	AKP

=== Mediterranean Region ===
==== Adana Province ====
(Entirely in the Mediterranean Region)

Districts of Adana

The following population data is based on the 2024 census. The list is sorted from highest to lowest population. According to the results of the local elections of March 31, 2024, mayors are listed with their parties.

Adana Province Population: 2,280,484

District	Population	Mayor	Party
Seyhan		Zeydan Karalar	CHP
Yüreğir		Ali Demirçalı	CHP
Çukurova		Emrah Kozay	CHP
Sarıçam		Bilal Uludağ	MHP
Ceyhan		Kadir Aydar	CHP
Kozan		Mustafa Atlı	MHP
İmamoğlu		Kasım Karaköse	CHP
Karataş		Ali Bedrettin Karataş	CHP
Karaisalı		Bekir Şimşek	MHP
Pozantı		Ali Avan	MHP
Yumurtalık		Erdinç Altıok	CHP
Tufanbeyli		Ahmet Aktürk	CHP
Aladağ		Kemal Özdemir	CHP
Feke		Cömert Özen	Y.Refah Party
Saimbeyli		Mahmut Dal	Independent

==== Antalya Province ====
(Entirely in the Mediterranean Region)

Districts of Antalya

The following population data is based on the 2024 census. The list is sorted from highest to lowest population. According to the results of the local elections of March 31, 2024, mayors are listed with their parties.

Antalya Province Population: 2,722,103

District	Population	Mayor	Party
Kepez	629,479	Mesut Kocagöz	CHP
Muratpaşa	509,444	Ümit Uysal	CHP
Alanya	361,873	Osman Tarık Özçelik	CHP
Manavgat	262,576	Niyazi Nefi Kara	CHP
Konyaaltı	196,079	Cem Kotan	CHP
Serik	143,435	Kadir Kumbul	CHP
Döşemealtı	90,572	Menderes Dal	CHP
Aksu	82,560	İsa Yıldırım	CHP
Kumluca	75,041	Mesut Avcıoğlu	DP
Kaş	63,921	Erol Demirhan	CHP
Korkuteli	58,728	Saniye Caran	CHP
Gazipaşa	55,362	Mehmetali Yılmaz	CHP
Finike	51,620	Mustafa Geyikçi	CHP
Kemer	50,436	Necati Topaloğlu	CHP
Elmalı	41,853	Halil Öztürk	CHP
Demre	27,814	Fahri Duran	CHP
Akseki	10,546	İlkay Akca	CHP
Gündoğmuş	7,353	Ali Gülen	AKP
İbradı	3,411	Hatice Sekmen	AKP

==== Burdur Province ====
(Entirely in the Mediterranean Region)

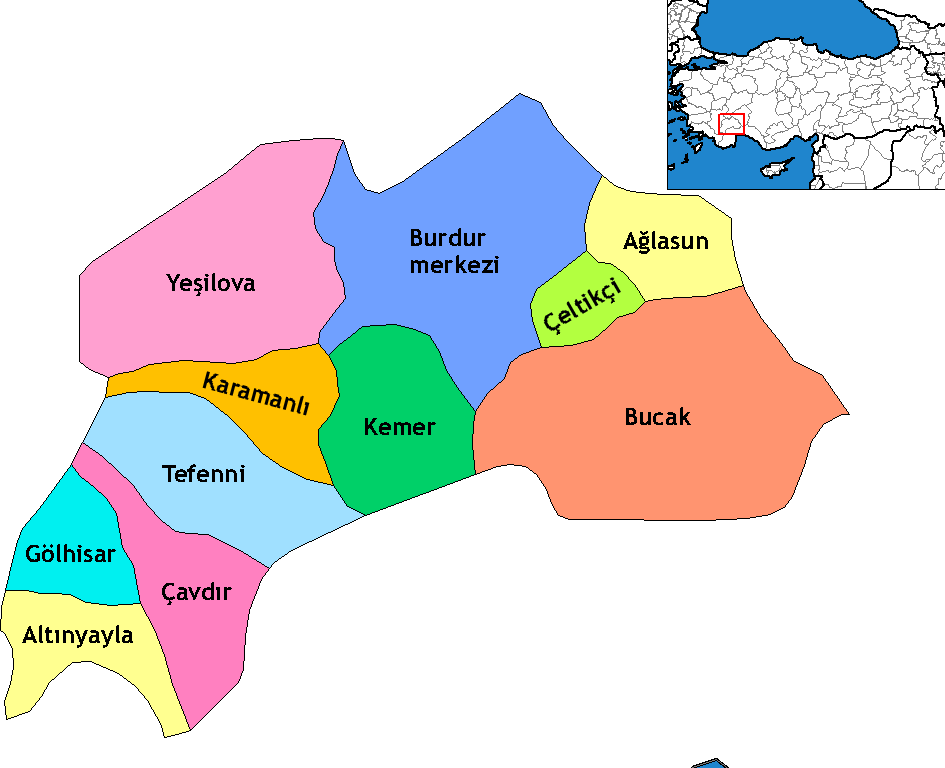
Districts of Burdur

The following population data is based on the 2024 census. The list is sorted from highest to lowest population. According to the results of the local elections of March 31, 2024, mayors are listed with their parties.

Burdur Province Population: 275,826

District	Population	Mayor	Party
Burdur (Merkez)	118,234	Ali Orkun Ercengiz	CHP
Bucak	68,096	Hülya Gümüş	CHP
Gölhisar	23,988	İbrahim Sertbaş	AKP
Yeşilova	14,179	Okan Kurd	CHP
Çavdır	12,741	Ali Okan Yücel	CHP
Tefenni	9,812	Ümit Alagöz	MHP
Karamanlı	8,223	Fatih Selimoğlu	AKP
Ağlasun	7,552	Ali Ulusoy	AKP
Altınyayla	5,120	Selen Kınalı	MHP
Çeltikçi	5,067	Ramazan Ezin	MHP
Kemer	2,814	İsmail Asan	AKP

==== Hatay Province ====
(Entirely in the Mediterranean Region)

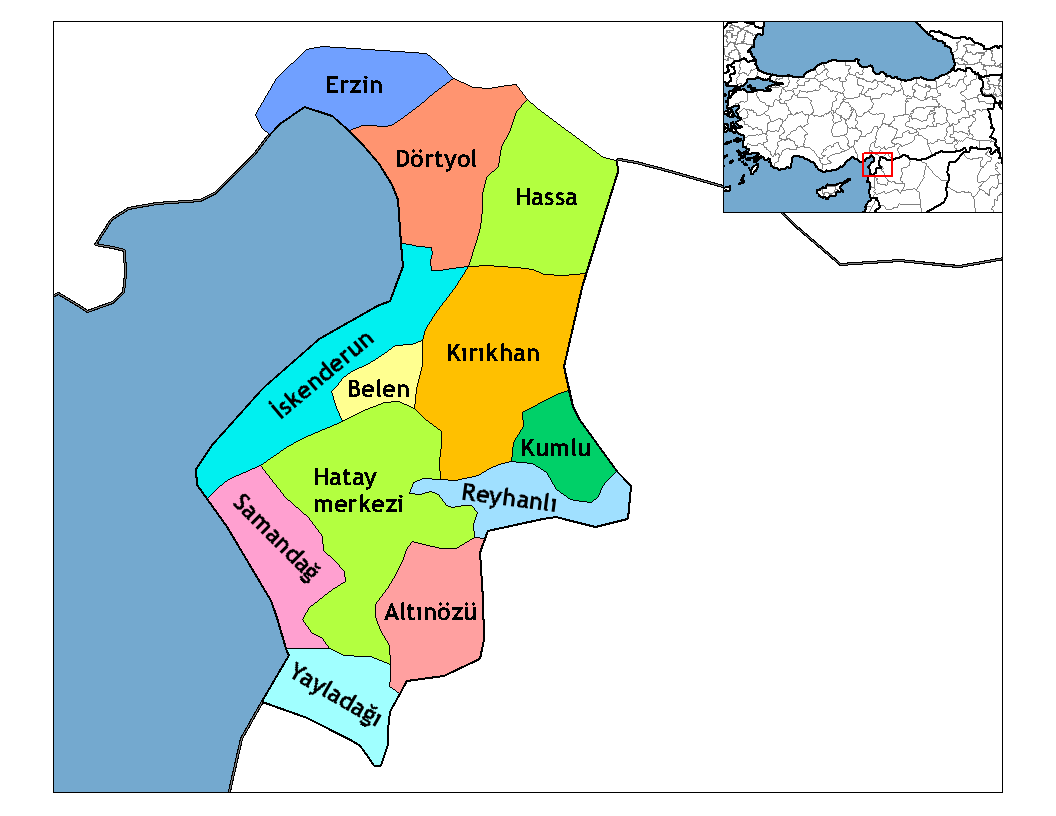
Districts of Hatay

The following population data is based on the 2024 census. The list is sorted from highest to lowest population. According to the results of the local elections of March 31, 2024, mayors are listed with their parties.

Hatay Province Population: 1,562,185

District	Population	Mayor	Party
Antakya	299,586	İbrahim Naci Yapar	AKP
İskenderun	231,926	Mehmet Dönmez	AKP
Defne	140,950	Halil İbrahim Özgün	CHP
Dörtyol	131,528	Bahadır Amaç	CHP
Samandağ	121,660	Emrah Karaçay	TİP
Reyhanlı	115,566	Ahmet Yumuşak	AKP
Arsuz	109,550	Sami Üstün	CHP
Kırıkhan	107,103	Ömer Erdal Çelik	AKP
Altınözü	68,500	Rifat Sarı	AKP
Hassa	56,541	Selahattin Çolak	AKP
Payas	44,073	Bekir Altan	AKP
Erzin	42,420	Ökkeş Elmasoğlu	CHP
Yayladağı	41,872	Mehmet Yalçın	AKP
Belen	35,755	İbrahim Gül	MHP
Kumlu	15,155	İbrahim Paç	BBP

==== Isparta Province ====
(Entirely in the Mediterranean Region)

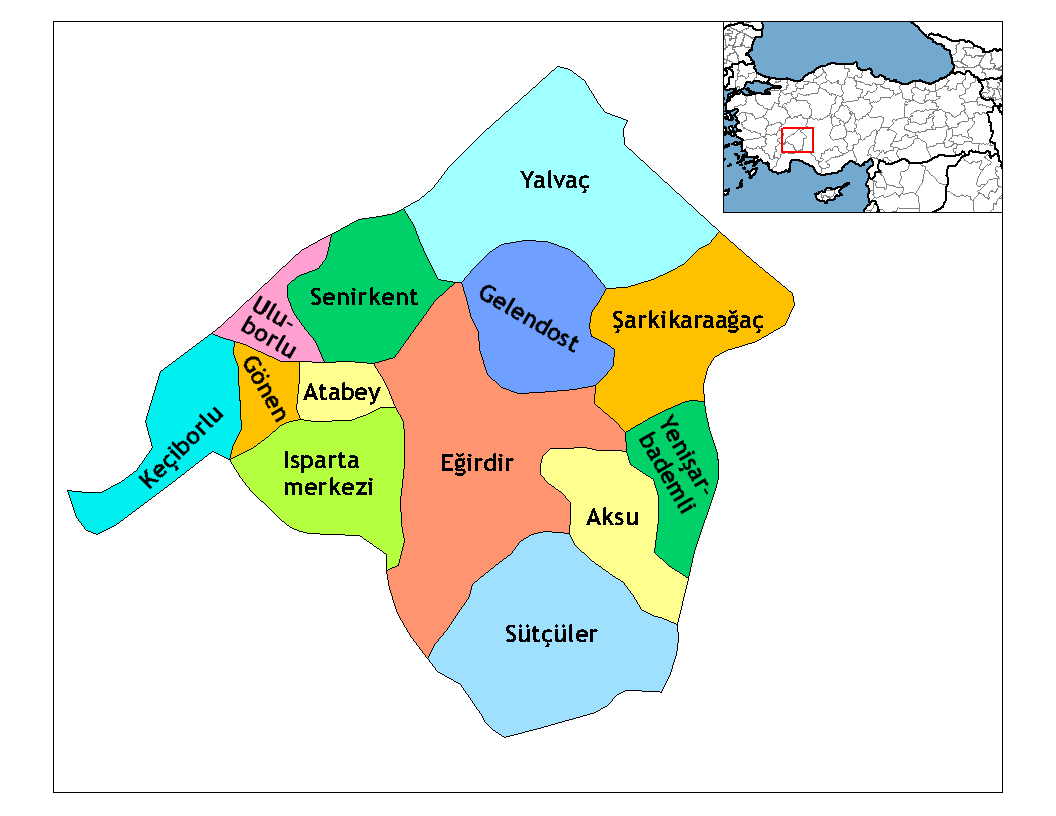
Districts of Isparta

The following population data is based on the 2024 census. The list is sorted from highest to lowest population. According to the results of the local elections of March 31, 2024, mayors are listed with their parties.

Isparta Province Population: 446,409

District	Population	Mayor	Party
Isparta (Merkez)	272,797	Şükrü Başdeğirmen	AKP
Yalvaç	44,777	Mustafa Kodal	İYİ Party
Eğirdir	30,053	Mustafa Özer	AKP
Şarkikaraağaç	24,579	Ali Göçer	AKP
Gelendost	14,235	Mustafa Özmen	İYİ Party
Keçiborlu	14,129	Yusuf Murat Parlak	AKP
Senirkent	10,659	Hüseyin Baykal	MHP
Sütçüler	9,470	İsmail Yurdabak	AKP
Gönen	6,877	Osman Kesmen	CHP
Uluborlu	6,344	Ahmet Oğuz Bakır	AKP
Atabey	6,090	Serdar Pehlivan	AKP
Aksu	4,148	Veli Kahraman	AKP
Yenişarbademli	2,251	Mehmet Özata	AKP

==== Kahramanmaraş Province ====
(Mostly in the Mediterranean Region)

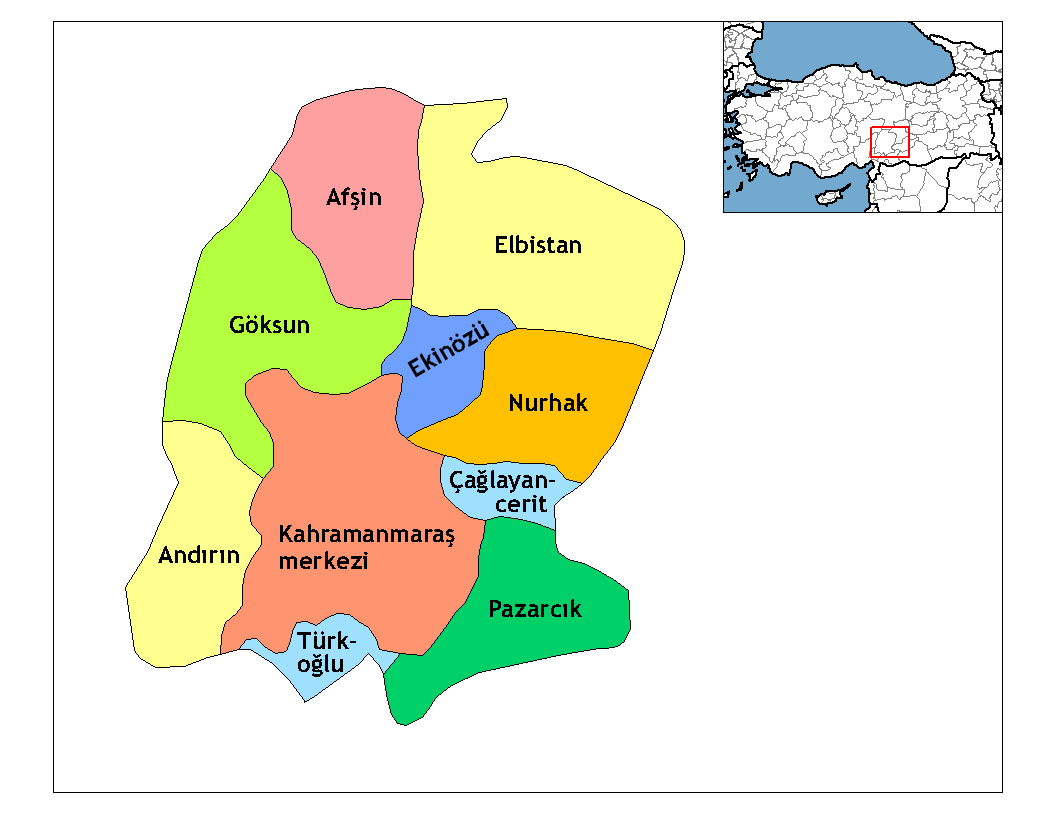
Districts of Kahramanmaraş

The following population data is based on the 2024 census. The list is sorted from highest to lowest population. According to the results of the local elections of March 31, 2024, mayors are listed with their parties.

Kahramanmaraş Province Population: 1,134,105

District	Population	Mayor	Party
Onikişubat	436,385	Hanifi Toptaş	AKP
Dulkadiroğlu	217,530	Mehmet Akpınar	Y.Refah
Elbistan	130,246	Erkan Gürbüz	CHP
Afşin	78,836	Koray Kıraç	AKP
Türkoğlu	78,047	Mehmet Karaca	Y.Refah
Pazarcık	67,057	Haydar İkizer	CHP
Göksun	49,576	Selim Cüce	Y.Refah
Andırın	32,059	Ahmet Sinan Gökşen	AKP
Çağlayancerit	22,498	Yemliha Göktaş	İYİ Parti
Nurhak	11,824	İlhami Bozan	CHP
Ekinözü	10,047	Harun Vicdan	CHP

==== Mersin Province ====
(Entirely in the Mediterranean Region)

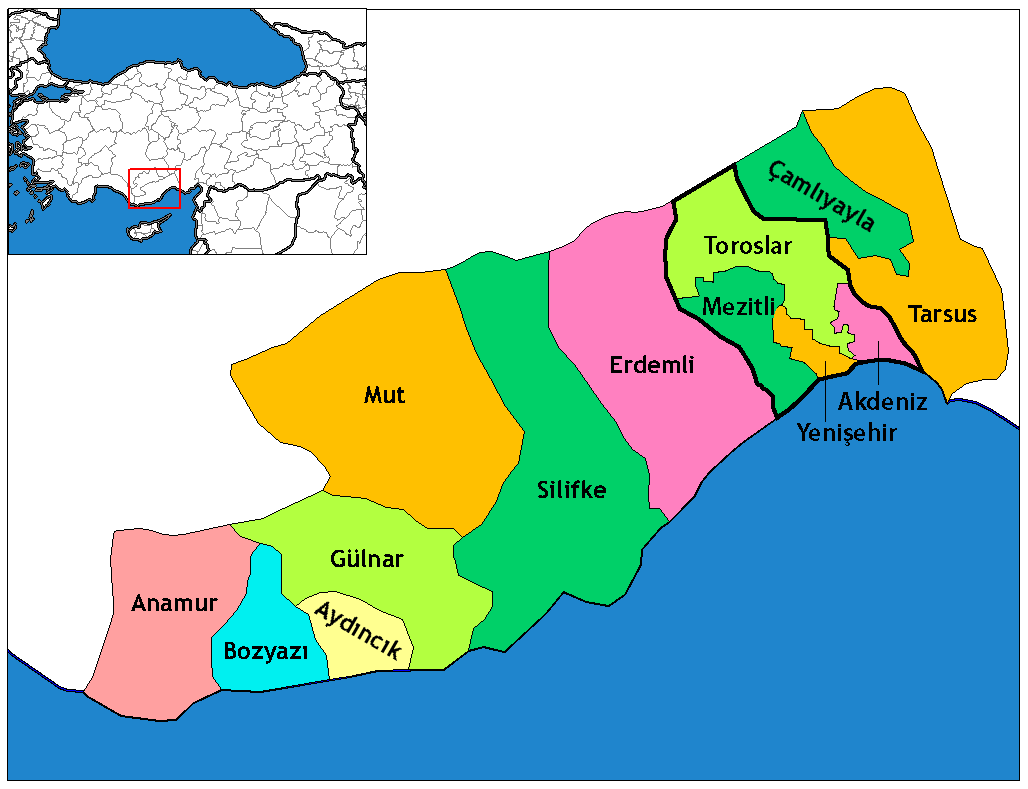
Districts of Mersin

The following population data is based on the 2024 census. The list is sorted from highest to lowest population. According to the results of the local elections of March 31, 2024, mayors are listed with their parties.

Mersin Province Population: 1,954,279

District	Population	Mayor	Party
Tarsus	356,937	Ali Boltaç	CHP
Toroslar	323,271	Abdurrahman Yıldız	CHP
Yenişehir	279,402	Abdullah Özyiğit	CHP
Akdeniz	256,292	Hoşyar Sarıyıldız	DEM
Mezitli	225,824	Ahmet Serkan Tuncer	CHP
Erdemli	155,435	Mustafa Kara	MHP
Silifke	139,852	Mustafa Turgut	CHP
Anamur	66,930	Durmuş Deniz	CHP
Mut	63,218	Murat Orhan	İYİ Party
Gülnar	40,188	Fatih Önge	MHP
Bozyazı	26,995	Mustafa Çetinkaya	MHP
Aydıncık	11,500	Özkan Kılıçarpa	CHP
Çamlıyayla	8,435	Mehmet Fatih Sofu	İYİ Party

==== Osmaniye Province ====
(Entirely in the Mediterranean Region)

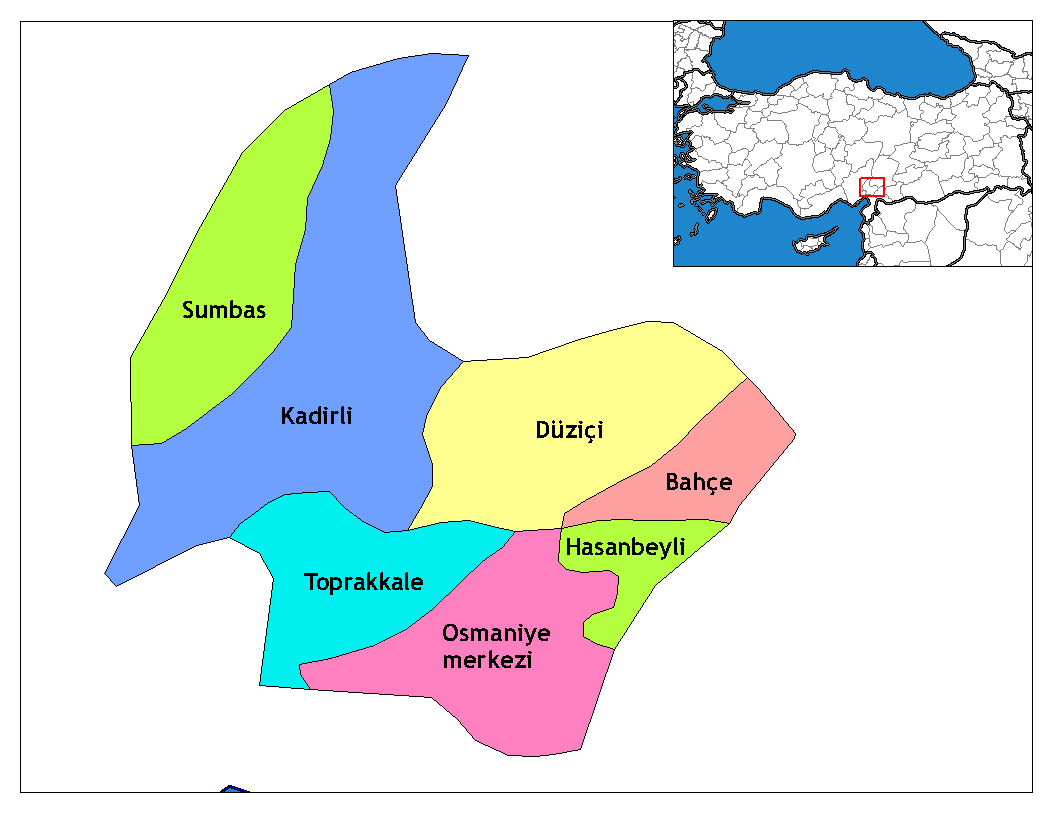
Districts of Osmaniye

The following population data is based on the 2024 census. The list is sorted from highest to lowest population. According to the results of the local elections of March 31, 2024, mayors are listed with their parties.

Osmaniye Province Population: 561,061

District	Population	Mayor	Party
Osmaniye (Merkez)	282,645	İbrahim Çenet	MHP
Kadirli	127,657	Mustafa Mert Olcar	CHP
Düziçi	86,929	Mustafa İba	AKP
Bahçe	23,069	Zeynel Mete Kadıoğlu	MHP
Toprakkale	22,518	Bekirhan Uyutmaz	AKP
Sumbas	13,240	Zeki Demiroğlu	AKP
Hasanbeyli	5,003	Şevket Yumrutepe	AKP

=== Southeastern Anatolia region ===
==== Adıyaman Province ====
(Mostly in the Southeastern Anatolia region)

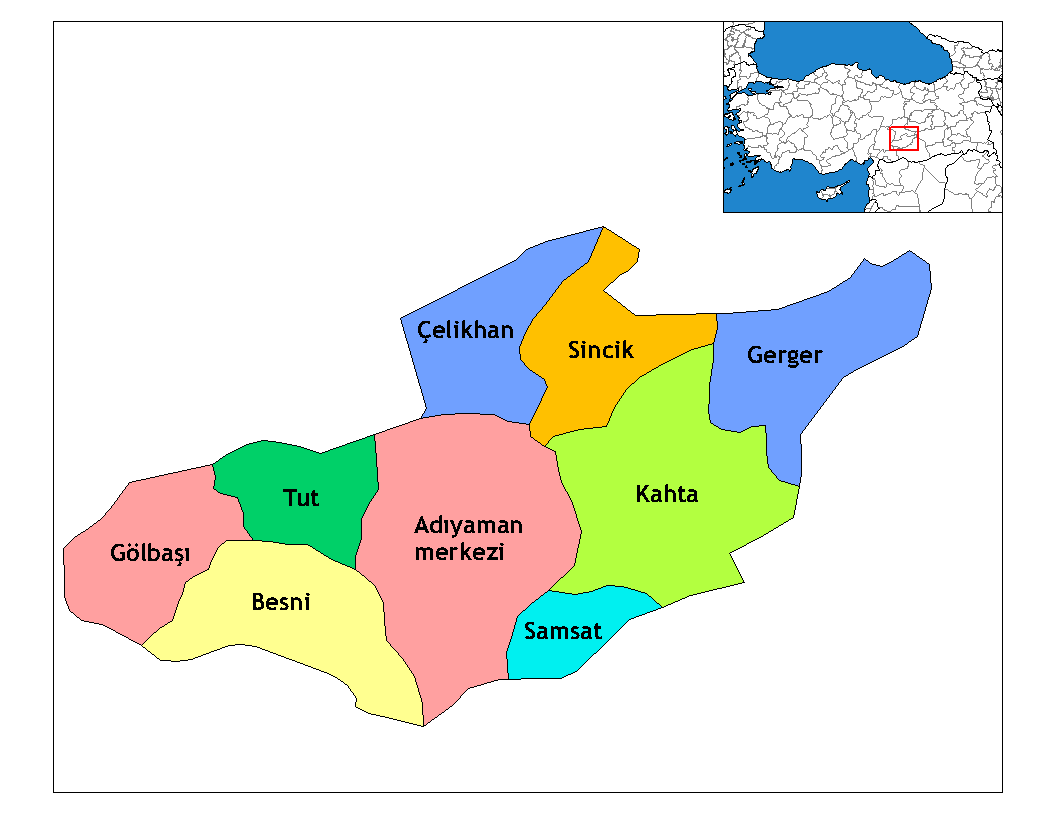
Districts of Adıyaman

The following population data is based on the 2024 census. The list is sorted from highest to lowest population. According to the results of the local elections of March 31, 2024, mayors are listed with their parties.

Adıyaman Province Population: 611,037

District	Population	Mayor	Party
Adıyaman (Merkez)	290,883	Abdurrahman Tutdere	CHP
Kahta	134,524	Memet Can Hallaç	AKP
Besni	75,849	Reşit Alkan	AKP
Gölbaşı	47,983	İskender Yıldırım	CHP
Sincik	16,016	Mehmet Korkut	AKP
Gerger	15,052	Erkan Aksoy	AKP
Çelikhan	14,641	Mahmut Şahin	DEVA Party
Tut	9,333	Ercan Öncebe	AKP
Samsat	6,756	Halil Fırat	AKP

==== Batman Province ====
(Mostly in the Southeastern Anatolia region)

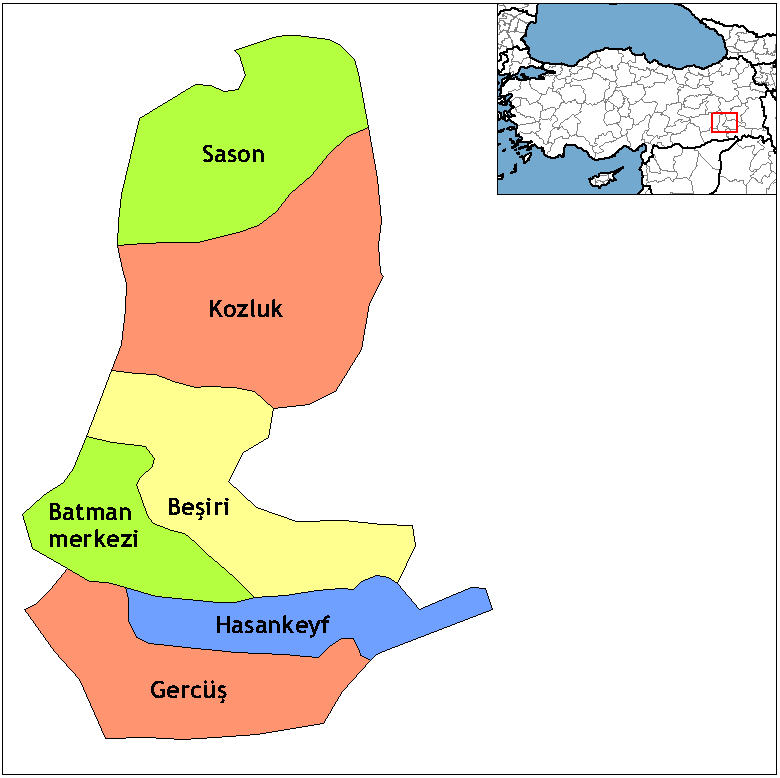
Districts of Batman

The following population data is based on the 2024 census. The list is sorted from highest to lowest population. According to the results of the local elections of March 31, 2024, mayors are listed with their parties.

Batman Province Population: 654,528

District	Population	Mayor	Party
Merkez	506,322	Gülüstan Sönük	DEM
Kozluk	59,562	Mehmet Veysi Işık	AKP
Beşiri	32,424	Alpaslan Karabulut	Y.Refah
Sason	29,102	İrfan Demir	AKP
Gercüş	19,794	Gündüz Günaydın	AKP
Hasankeyf	7,324	Hamit Tutuş	CHP

==== Diyarbakır Province ====
(Mostly in the Southeastern Anatolia region)

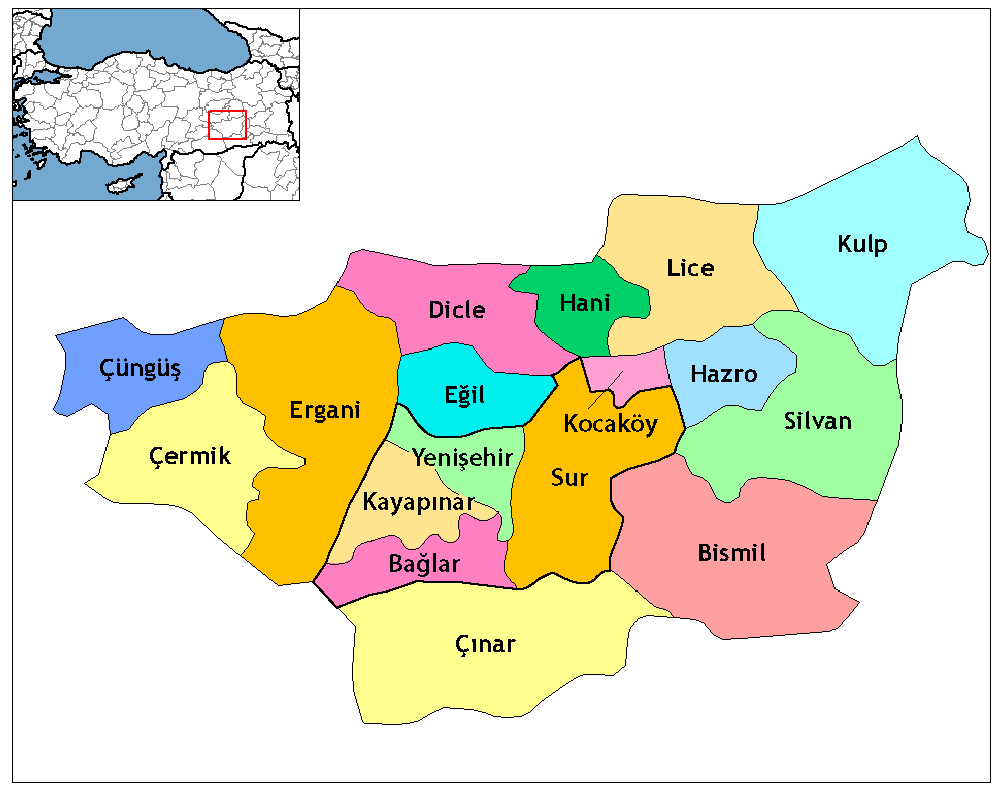
Districts of Diyarbakır

The following population data is based on the 2024 census. The list is sorted from highest to lowest population. According to the results of the local elections of March 31, 2024, mayors are listed with their parties.

Diyarbakır Province Population: 1,833,684

District	Population	Mayor	Party
Kayapınar	440,886	Gülşen Sincar	DEM
Bağlar	397,661	Sıraç Çelik	DEM
Yenişehir	228,570	Safiye Akdağ	DEM
Ergani	139,223	Şiyar Güldiken	DEM
Bismil	120,093	Mizgin Ekin	DEM
Sur	97,823	Adnan Örhan	DEM
Silvan	86,905	Sevim Biçici	DEM
Çınar	78,788	Semra Akyüz	DEM
Çermik	49,607	Şehmus Karamehmetoğlu	AKP
Dicle	36,758	Hacı Akengin	DEM
Kulp	35,264	Fatma Ay	DEM
Hani	32,604	Besile Narin	DEM
Lice	24,959	Dilek Diyar Özer	DEM
Eğil	22,346	Fırat Seydaoğlu	AKP
Hazro	16,411	Fuat Mehmetoğlu	AKP
Kocaköy	15,323	Mehmet Şık	DEM
Çüngüş	10,463	Ali Suat Akmeşe	AKP

==== Gaziantep Province ====
(Mostly in the Southeastern Anatolia region)

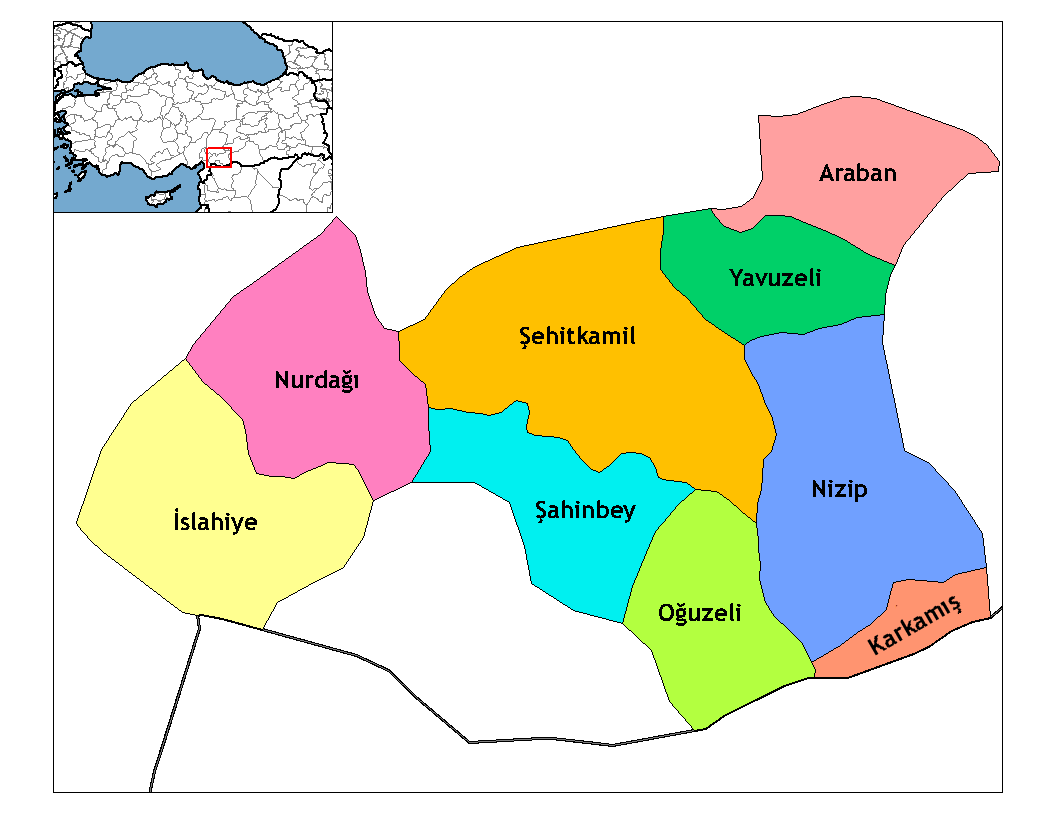
Districts of Gaziantep

The following population data is based on the 2024 census. The list is sorted from highest to lowest population. According to the results of the local elections of March 31, 2024, mayors are listed with their parties.

Gaziantep Province Population: 2,193,363

District	Population	Mayor	Party
Şahinbey	946,812	Mehmet İhsan Tahmazoğlu	AKP
Şehitkamil	888,696	Umut Yılmaz	CHP
Nizip	151,246	Ali Doğan	CHP
İslahiye	65,208	Kemal Vural	AKP
Nurdağı	38,701	Mehmet Yıldırır	AKP
Oğuzeli	37,027	Bekir Öztekin	Y.Refah Party
Araban	32,832	Mehmet Özdemir	MHP
Yavuzeli	23,329	Mehmet Kaya	Y.Refah Party
Karkamış	9,512	Mustafa Güzel	CHP

==== Kilis Province ====
(Mostly in the Southeastern Anatolia region)

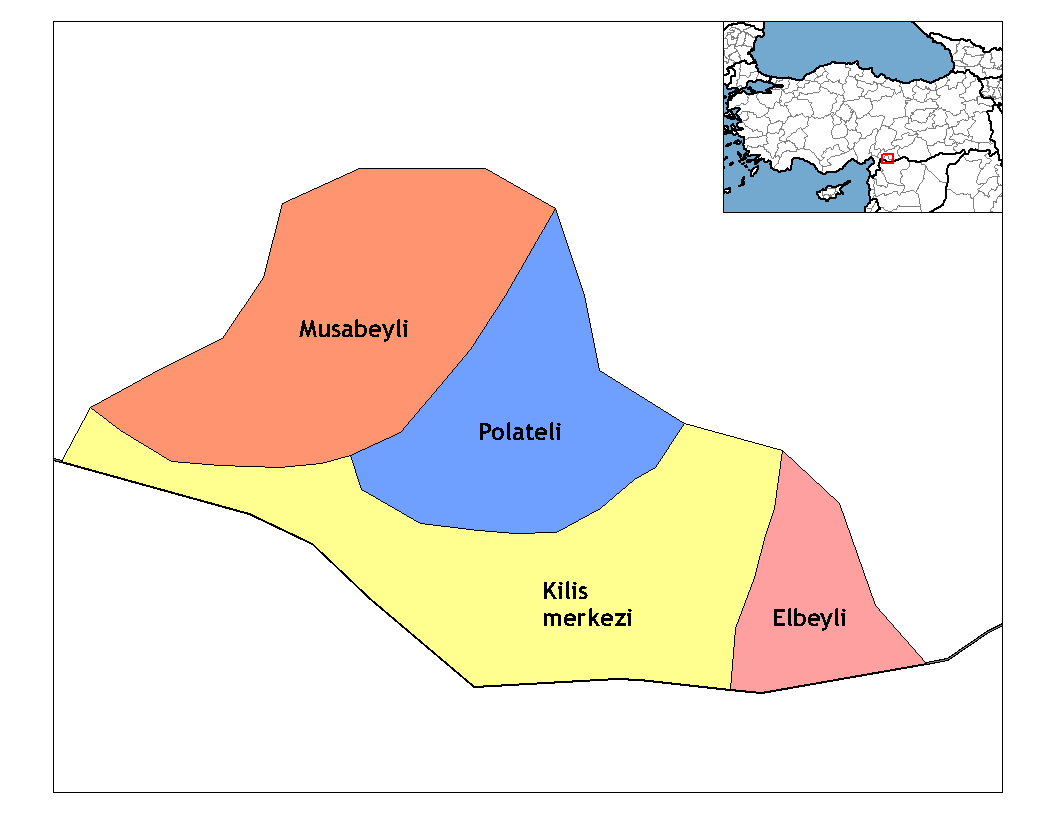
Districts of Kilis

The following population data is based on the 2024 census. The list is sorted from highest to lowest population. According to the results of the local elections of March 31, 2024, mayors are listed with their parties.

Kilis Province Population: 156,739

District	Population	Mayor	Party
Kilis (Merkez)	133,225	Hakan Bilecen	CHP
Musabeyli	12,612	Mehmet Ölmez	MHP
Elbeyli	5,830	İsmail Kördeve	AKP
Polateli	5,072	Ali Koyuncu	CHP

==== Mardin Province ====
(Entirely in the Southeastern Anatolia regio)

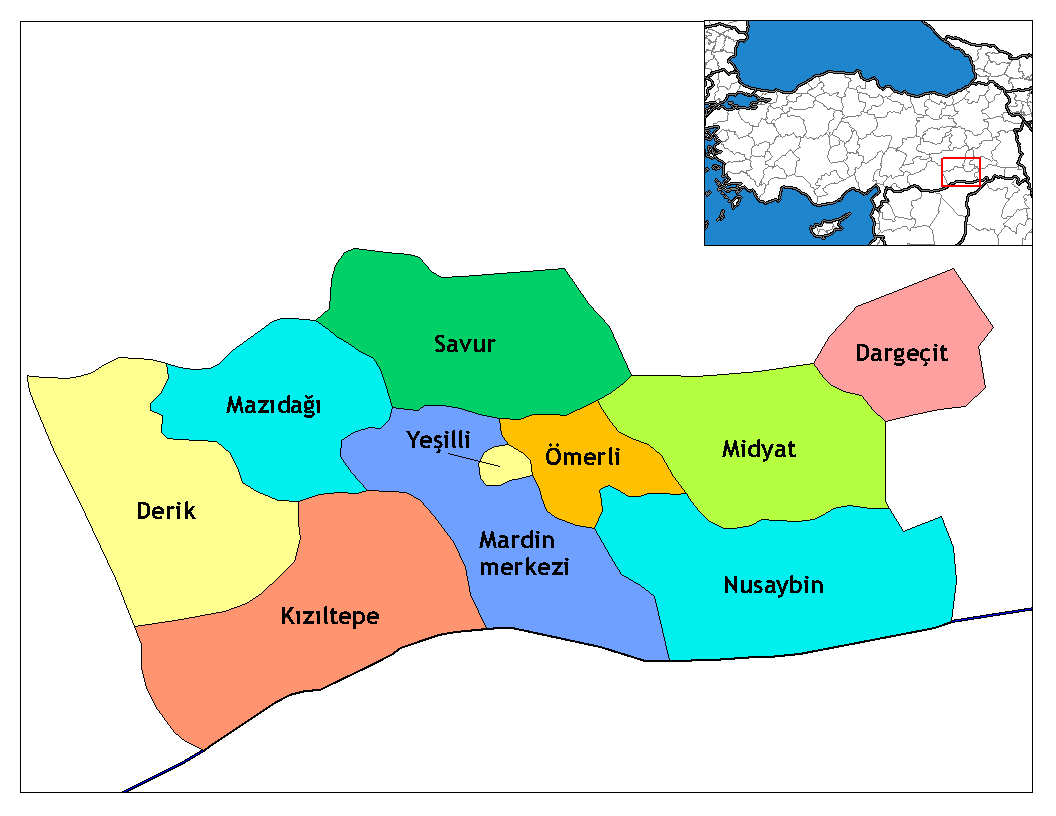
Districts of Mardin

The following population data is based on the 2024 census. The list is sorted from highest to lowest population. According to the results of the local elections of March 31, 2024, mayors are listed with their parties.

Mardin Province Population: 895,911

District	Population	Mayor	Party
Kızıltepe	275,460	Zeyni İpek	DEM
Artuklu	197,776	Mehmet Ali Amak	DEM
Midyat	124,543	Veysi Şahin	AKP
Nusaybin	119,499	Gülbin Şahin Dağhan	DEM
Derik	62,401	Songül Özbahçeci	DEM
Mazıdağı	37,470	Kudret Uçuk	DEM
Dargeçit	27,406	Asya Gezer	DEM
Savur	24,294	Engin Uğur Hamidi	AKP
Ömerli	14,066	Hüsamettin Altındağ	AKP
Yeşilli	12,996	Hayrettin Demir	AKP

==== Siirt Province ====
(Mostly in the Southeastern Anatolia region)

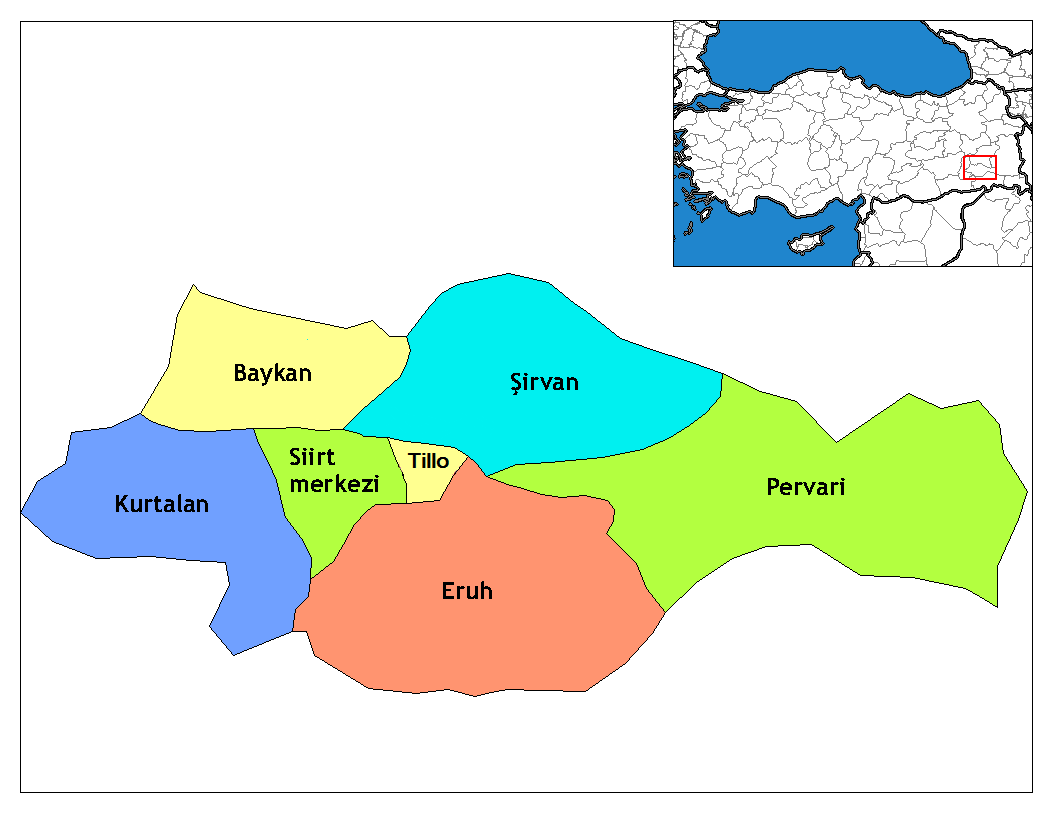
Districts of Siirt

The following population data is based on the 2024 census. The list is sorted from highest to lowest population. According to the results of the local elections of March 31, 2024, mayors are listed with their parties.

Siirt Province Population: 336,453

District	Population	Mayor	Party
Siirt (Merkez)	181,118	Sofya Alağaş	DEM
Kurtalan	61,004	Ali Rıza Bingöl	DEM
Pervari	27,407	Teyyar Özcan	AKP
Baykan	24,168	Ekrem Erdem	AKP
Şirvan	19,563	Necat Cellek	AKP
Eruh	18,932	Cevher Çiftçi	AKP
Tillo	4,261	İdham Aydın	AKP

==== Şanlıurfa Province ====
(Entirely in the Southeastern Anatolia region)

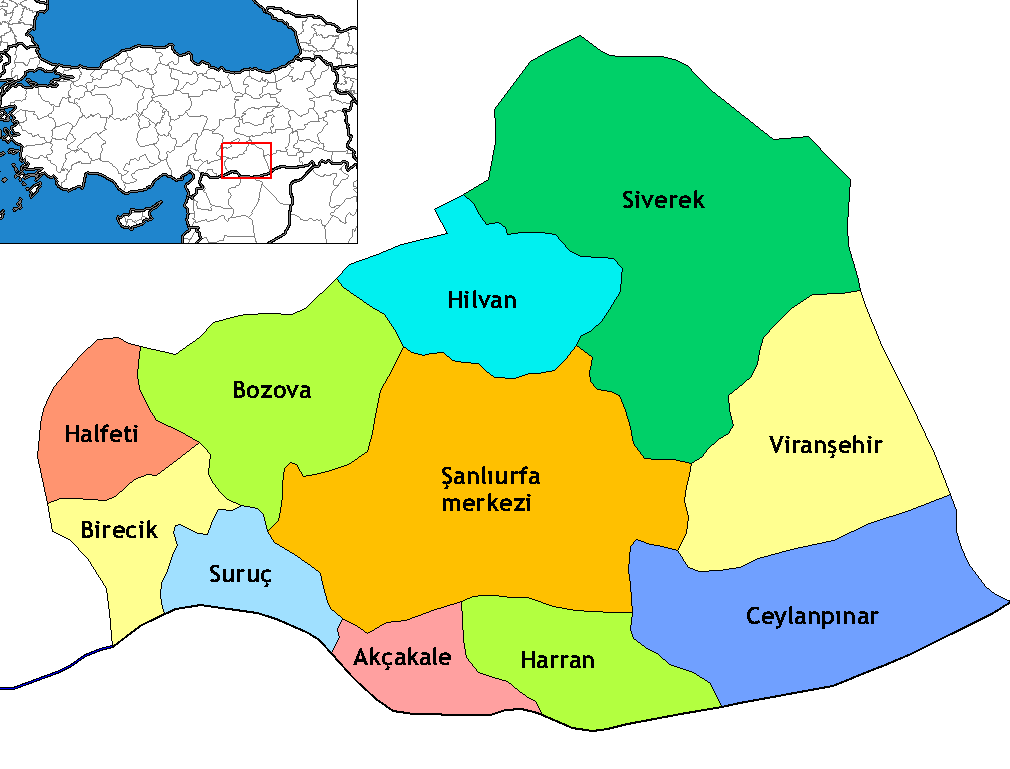
Districts of Şanlıurfa

The following population data is based on the 2024 census. The list is sorted from highest to lowest population. According to the results of the local elections of March 31, 2024, mayors are listed with their parties.

Şanlıurfa Province Population: 2,237,745

District	Population	Mayor	Party
Eyyübiye	405,089	Mehmet Kuş	AKP
Haliliye	396,226	Mehmet Canpolat	AKP
Karaköprü	295,746	Nihat Çiftçi	Y.Refah Party
Siverek	274,588	Ali Murat Bucak	AKP
Viranşehir	213,352	Serhat Dicle İnan	DEM
Akçakale	129,262	Abdülhakim Ayhan	AKP
Suruç	100,137	Ayten Kaya	DEM
Harran	99,990	Mahmut Özyavuz	MHP
Birecik	92,833	Mehmet Begit	DEM
Ceylanpınar	92,361	Uğur Kahraman	DEM
Bozova	52,578	Aygül Kapıkayalı	DEM
Halfeti	43,023	Mehmet Karayılan	DEM
Hilvan	42,560	Serhan Paydaş	DEM

== See also ==
- List of regions in Turkey
- List of provinces in Turkey
- List of cities and towns in Turkey
