= List of municipalities in Yozgat Province =

This is the List of municipalities in Yozgat Province, Turkey as of March 2023.

District	Municipality
Akdağmadeni	Akdağmadeni
Akdağmadeni	Belekçehan
Akdağmadeni	Oluközü
Akdağmadeni	Umutlu
Aydıncık	Aydıncık
Aydıncık	Baydiğin
Boğazlıyan	Boğazlıyan
Boğazlıyan	Ovakent
Boğazlıyan	Sırçalı
Boğazlıyan	Uzunlu
Boğazlıyan	Yamaçlı
Boğazlıyan	Yenipazar
Çandır	Çandır
Çayıralan	Çayıralan
Çayıralan	Konuklar
Çekerek	Çekerek
Çekerek	Özükavak
Kadışehri	Halıköy
Kadışehri	Kadışehri
Saraykent	Dedefakılı
Saraykent	Ozan
Saraykent	Saraykent
Sarıkaya	Karayakup
Sarıkaya	Sarıkaya
Şefaatli	Şefaatli
Sorgun	Araplı
Sorgun	Bahadın
Sorgun	Çiğdemli
Sorgun	Doğankent
Sorgun	Eymir
Sorgun	Gülşehri
Sorgun	Sorgun
Sorgun	Yeniyer
Yenifakılı	Yenifakılı
Yerköy	Yerköy
Yozgat	Yozgat
