= List of populated places in Yozgat Province =

Below is the list of populated places in Yozgat Province, Turkey by the districts. In the following lists first place in each list is the administrative center of the district.

== Yozgat ==
- Yozgat
- Aktaş, Yozgat
- Akyamaç, Yozgat
- Alemdar, Yozgat
- Aydoğan, Yozgat
- Azizli, Yozgat
- Azizlibağları, Yozgat
- Bacılı, Yozgat
- Bahçecik, Yozgat
- Baltasarılar, Yozgat
- Başıbüyüklü, Yozgat
- Başınayayla, Yozgat
- Battal, Yozgat
- Bayatören, Yozgat
- Beyvelioğlu, Yozgat
- Bişek, Yozgat
- Bozlar, Yozgat
- Buzağcıoğlu, Yozgat
- Büyükincirli, Yozgat
- Büyükmahal, Yozgat
- Büyüknefes, Yozgat
- Cihanpaşa, Yozgat
- Çadırardıç, Yozgat
- Çağlayan, Yozgat
- Çalatlı, Yozgat
- Çalılı, Yozgat
- Çatma, Yozgat
- Çorak, Yozgat
- Dağyenicesi, Yozgat
- Dambasan, Yozgat
- Darıcı, Yozgat
- Dayılı, Yozgat
- Delihasanlı, Yozgat
- Derbent, Yozgat
- Dereboymul, Yozgat
- Derekışla, Yozgat
- Deremahal, Yozgat
- Deremumlu, Yozgat
- Divanlı, Yozgat
- Erkekli, Yozgat
- Esenli, Yozgat
- Evci, Yozgat
- Fakıbeyli, Yozgat
- Gevrek, Yozgat
- Gökçekışla, Yozgat
- Görpeli, Yozgat
- Güdülelmahacılı, Yozgat
- Güllük, Yozgat
- Güllüoluk, Yozgat
- Gülyayla, Yozgat
- Güneşli, Yozgat
- Hamzalı, Yozgat
- Haydarbeyli, Yozgat
- İnceçayır, Yozgat
- İşleğen, Yozgat
- Kababel, Yozgat
- Kale, Yozgat
- Karabıyık, Yozgat
- Karacalar, Yozgat
- Karalar, Yozgat
- Kaşkışla, Yozgat
- Kavurgalı, Yozgat
- Kırıksoku, Yozgat
- Kırım, Yozgat
- Kışla, Yozgat
- Kızıltepe, Yozgat
- Kolanlı, Yozgat
- Koyunculu, Yozgat
- Köçekkömü, Yozgat
- Köçeklioğlu, Yozgat
- Köseyusuflu, Yozgat
- Kuşcu, Yozgat
- Kuyumcu, Yozgat
- Lök, Yozgat
- Mezraa, Yozgat
- Musabeyli, Yozgat
- Musabeyliboğazı, Yozgat
- Osmanpaşa, Yozgat
- Örencik, Yozgat
- Özlüce, Yozgat
- Penbecik, Yozgat
- Recepli, Yozgat
- Sağlık, Yozgat
- Salmanfakılı, Yozgat
- Sarıfatma, Yozgat
- Sarıhacılı, Yozgat
- Sarımbey, Yozgat
- Sarınınören, Yozgat
- Söğütlüyayla, Yozgat
- Tayfur, Yozgat
- Tayıp, Yozgat
- Tekkeyenicesi, Yozgat
- Topaç, Yozgat
- Topcu, Yozgat
- Türkmen, Yozgat
- Türkmensarılar, Yozgat
- Yassıhüyük, Yozgat
- Yazpınar, Yozgat
- Yeşilova, Yozgat
- Yudan, Yozgat

== Akdağmadeni ==
- Akdağmadeni
- Abdurrahmanlı, Akdağmadeni
- Ağaçlı, Akdağmadeni
- Akbaş, Akdağmadeni
- Akçakışla, Akdağmadeni
- Akçakoyunlu, Akdağmadeni
- Alicik, Akdağmadeni
- Altılı, Akdağmadeni
- Ardıçalanı, Akdağmadeni
- Arpalık, Akdağmadeni
- Arslanlı, Akdağmadeni
- Aşağıçulhalı, Akdağmadeni
- Bahçecik, Akdağmadeni
- Başçatak, Akdağmadeni
- Belekçehan
- Boğazköy, Akdağmadeni
- Boyalık, Akdağmadeni
- Bozhüyük, Akdağmadeni
- Bulgurlu, Akdağmadeni
- Çağlayan, Akdağmadeni
- Muşalikalesi, Akdağmadeni
- Çampınar, Akdağmadeni
- Çardak, Akdağmadeni
- Çaypınar, Akdağmadeni
- Çerçialanı, Akdağmadeni
- Davulbaz, Akdağmadeni
- Davutlu, Akdağmadeni
- Dayılı, Akdağmadeni
- Dereyurt, Akdağmadeni
- Dokuz, Akdağmadeni
- Dolak, Akdağmadeni
- Evci, Akdağmadeni
- Eynelli, Akdağmadeni
- Gökdere, Akdağmadeni
- Güllük, Akdağmadeni
- Gümüşdibek, Akdağmadeni
- Gündüzler, Akdağmadeni
- Hacıfakılı, Akdağmadeni
- Halhacı, Akdağmadeni
- Hayran, Akdağmadeni
- Hüyüklüalanı, Akdağmadeni
- İbrahimağaçiftliği, Akdağmadeni
- Karaalikaçağı, Akdağmadeni
- Karacaören, Akdağmadeni
- Karadikmen, Akdağmadeni
- Karahisartatlısı, Akdağmadeni
- Karapir, Akdağmadeni
- Kartal, Akdağmadeni
- Kayabaşı, Akdağmadeni
- Kayakışla, Akdağmadeni
- Kılınçlı, Akdağmadeni
- Kırlar, Akdağmadeni
- Kızılcaova, Akdağmadeni
- Kızıldağ, Akdağmadeni
- Kirsinkavağı, Akdağmadeni
- Konacı, Akdağmadeni
- Körük, Akdağmadeni
- Kuşlukaçağı, Akdağmadeni
- Melikli, Akdağmadeni
- Okçulu, Akdağmadeni
- Olucak, Akdağmadeni
- Oluközü, Akdağmadeni
- Ortaköy, Akdağmadeni
- Örenkale, Akdağmadeni
- Özer, Akdağmadeni
- Paşabey, Akdağmadeni
- Pazarcık, Akdağmadeni
- Sağıroğlu, Akdağmadeni
- Sarıgüney, Akdağmadeni
- Sekikaşı, Akdağmadeni
- Sazlıdere, Akdağmadeni
- Şahnaderesi, Akdağmadeni
- Tarhana, Akdağmadeni
- Taspınar, Akdağmadeni
- Tekkegüneyi, Akdağmadeni
- Temurşeyh, Akdağmadeni
- Umutlu, Akdağmadeni
- Uzakçay, Akdağmadeni
- Üçkaraağaç, Akdağmadeni
- Veziralanı, Akdağmadeni
- Yazılıtaş, Akdağmadeni
- Yedişehri, Akdağmadeni
- Yeniyapan, Akdağmadeni
- Yukarıçulhalı, Akdağmadeni
- Yünalanı, Akdağmadeni

== Aydıncık ==
- Aydıncık
- Ağıllı, Aydıncık
- Aşağıkuyucak, Aydıncık
- Bakırboğazı, Aydıncık
- Baştürk, Aydıncık
- Baydiğin, Aydıncık
- Benlioğlu, Aydıncık
- Boğazkaya, Aydıncık
- Büyüktoraman, Aydıncık
- Dereçiftlik, Aydıncık
- Güroğlu, Aydıncık
- Hacıilyas, Aydıncık
- Kazankaya, Aydıncık
- Kırımoluk, Aydıncık
- Kıyıkışla, Aydıncık
- Kızılcakışla, Aydıncık
- Kocabekir, Aydıncık
- Kösrelik, Aydıncık
- Kuşsaray, Aydıncık
- Kuyu, Aydıncık
- Küçüktoraman, Aydıncık
- Mercimekören, Aydıncık
- Mollaismail, Aydıncık
- Sakızlık, Aydıncık
- Üzümlük, Aydıncık

== Boğazlıyan ==
- Boğazlıyan
- Abdilli, Boğazlıyan
- Aşağıhasinli, Boğazlıyan
- Aşağısarıkaya, Boğazlıyan
- Bahariye, Boğazlıyan
- Başhoroz, Boğazlıyan
- Belören, Boğazlıyan
- Çakmak, Boğazlıyan
- Çalapverdi, Boğazlıyan
- Dereçepni, Boğazlıyan
- Devecipınar, Boğazlıyan
- Eğlence, Boğazlıyan
- Esentepe, Boğazlayan
- Gövdecili, Boğazlıyan
- Güveçli, Boğazlıyan
- Karakuyu, Boğazlıyan
- Müftükışla, Boğazlıyan
- Oğulcuk, Boğazlıyan
- Ovakent, Boğazlıyan
- Ömerli, Boğazlıyan
- Özler, Boğazlıyan
- Poyrazlı, Boğazlıyan
- Sırçalı, Boğazlıyan
- Uzunlu, Boğazlıyan
- Yamaçlı, Boğazlıyan
- Yapalak, Boğazlıyan
- Yaraş, Boğazlıyan
- Yazıçepni, Boğazlıyan
- Yazıkışla, Boğazlıyan
- Yenikışla, Boğazlıyan
- Yenipazar, Boğazlıyan
- Yeşilhisar, Boğazlıyan
- Yoğunhisar, Boğazlıyan

== Çandır ==
- Çandır
- Büyükkışla, Çandır
- Gülpınar, Çandır
- İğdeli, Çandır
- Kozan, Çandır

== Çayıralan ==
- Çayıralan
- Alidemirci, Çayıralan
- Aşağıtekke, Çayıralan
- Aşağıyahyasaray, Çayıralan
- Avşaralanı, Çayıralan
- Curali, Çayıralan
- Çokradan, Çayıralan
- Derekemal, Çayıralan
- Elçi, Çayıralan
- Evciler, Çayıralan
- Fahralı, Çayıralan
- Günyayla, Çayıralan
- Güzelyayla, Çayıralan
- İnönü, Çayıralan
- Kaletepe, Çayıralan
- Karakışla, Çayıralan
- Konuklar, Çayıralan
- Külekçi, Çayıralan
- Menteşe, Çayıralan
- Söbeçimen, Çayıralan
- Turluhan, Çayıralan
- Yukarıtekke, Çayıralan
- Yukarıyahyasaray, Çayıralan

== Çekerek ==
- Çekerek
- Alıçlı, Çekerek
- Arpaç, Çekerek
- Başalan, Çekerek
- Başpınar, Çekerek
- Bayındırhüyük, Çekerek
- Bazlambaç, Çekerek
- Beyyurdu, Çekerek
- Cemaloğlu, Çekerek
- Çakır, Çekerek
- Çandır, Çekerek
- Çayırözü, Çekerek
- Çeltek, Çekerek
- Demircialan, Çekerek
- Doğanoğlu, Çekerek
- Ekizce, Çekerek
- Elemin, Çekerek
- Fakıdağı, Çekerek
- Fuadiye, Çekerek
- Gökdere, Çekerek
- Gönülyurdu, Çekerek
- Hamzalı, Çekerek
- İlbeyli, Çekerek
- İsaklı, Çekerek
- Kahyalı, Çekerek
- Kalederesi, Çekerek
- Kamışcık, Çekerek
- Kavakalanı, Çekerek
- Kayalar, Çekerek
- Kırkdilim, Çekerek
- Koyunculu, Çekerek
- Körpınar, Çekerek
- Kurtağılı, Çekerek
- Kuruçay, Çekerek
- Kuzgun, Çekerek
- Mehmetli, Çekerek
- Ortaoba, Çekerek
- Özören, Çekerek
- Özükavak, Çekerek
- Sarıkaya, Çekerek
- Sarıköy, Çekerek
- Tipideresi, Çekerek
- Yukarıkarahacılı, Çekerek
- Yukarıkarakaya, Çekerek
- Yukarıoba, Çekerek

== Kadışehri ==
- Kadışehri
- Akçakale, Kadışehri
- Aşağıkızılöz, Kadışehri
- Belören, Kadışehri
- Buzluk, Kadışehri
- Çamsaray, Kadışehri
- Derbent, Kadışehri
- Dikmesöğüt, Kadışehri
- Elmalı, Kadışehri
- Elmalıçiftliği, Kadışehri
- Elmalıütüğü, Kadışehri
- Gümüşsu, Kadışehri
- Halıköy, Kadışehri
- Hanözü, Kadışehri
- Kabalı, Kadışehri
- Kemalli, Kadışehri
- Kıyılı, Kadışehri
- Ovacık, Kadışehri
- Örencik, Kadışehri
- Seyhan, Kadışehri
- Üçağaç, Kadışehri
- Yakacık, Kadışehri
- Yangı, Kadışehri
- Yanık, Kadışehri
- Yavuhasan, Kadışehri
- Yelten, Kadışehri
- Yoncalık, Kadışehri
- Yukarıkızılöz, Kadışehri

== Saraykent ==
- Saraykent
- Altınsu, Saraykent
- Balkaya, Saraykent
- Başpınar, Saraykent
- Benli, Saraykent
- Çiçekli, Saraykent
- Çiçeklihüyüğü, Saraykent
- Dedefakılı, Saraykent
- İzibüyük, Saraykent
- Kamberli, Saraykent
- Karapınar, Saraykent
- Kesikköprü, Saraykent
- Kösealili, Saraykent
- Ozan, Saraykent
- Parmaksız, Saraykent
- Sarayözü, Saraykent
- Söğütlü, Saraykent

== Sarıkaya ==
- Sarıkaya
- Akbenli, Sarıkaya
- Akbucak, Sarıkaya
- Akçadam, Sarıkaya
- Alembey, Sarıkaya
- Alifakılı, Sarıkaya
- Arpalık, Sarıkaya
- Azapbaşılı, Sarıkaya
- Babayağmur, Sarıkaya
- Bağlıca, Sarıkaya
- Baraklı, Sarıkaya
- Bebekköy, Sarıkaya
- Boyalık, Sarıkaya
- Burunkışla, Sarıkaya
- Büyükçalağıl, Sarıkaya
- Çatak, Sarıkaya
- Çıkrıkçı, Sarıkaya
- Çokumeşme, Sarıkaya
- Deredoğan, Sarıkaya
- Derekaplancı, Sarıkaya
- Doğansaray, Sarıkaya
- Emirbey, Sarıkaya
- Erbek, Sarıkaya
- Gülpınar, Sarıkaya
- Gündüzlü, Sarıkaya
- Hasbek, Sarıkaya
- Hisarbey, Sarıkaya
- Ilısu, Sarıkaya
- İnevi, Sarıkaya
- İnkışla, Sarıkaya
- Kadıgüllü, Sarıkaya
- Kadılı, Sarıkaya
- Karabacak, Sarıkaya
- Karacalar, Sarıkaya
- Karaelli, Sarıkaya
- Karahallı, Sarıkaya
- Karayakup, Sarıkaya
- Kargalık, Sarıkaya
- Kemallı, Sarıkaya
- Kerpiçcik, Sarıkaya
- Koçak, Sarıkaya
- Koçcağız, Sarıkaya
- Konurlu, Sarıkaya
- Köprücek, Sarıkaya
- Küçükçalağıl, Sarıkaya
- Kürkcü, Sarıkaya
- Mescitli, Sarıkaya
- Pınarkaya, Sarıkaya
- Ramadanlı, Sarıkaya
- Selimli, Sarıkaya
- Söylemez, Sarıkaya
- Tepedoğan, Sarıkaya
- Tomarcahüyüğü, Sarıkaya
- Topaktaş, Sarıkaya
- Toprakpınar, Sarıkaya
- Ürkütlü, Sarıkaya
- Yahyalı, Sarıkaya
- Yaylagül, Sarıkaya
- Yazıkaplancı, Sarıkaya
- Yukarısarıkaya, Sarıkaya

== Sorgun ==
- Sorgun
- Ağcın, Sorgun
- Ahmetfakılı, Sorgun
- Akocak, Sorgun
- Akoluk, Sorgun
- Alcı, Sorgun
- Alişar, Sorgun
- Araplı, Sorgun
- Aşağıcumafakılı, Sorgun
- Aşağıemirler, Sorgun
- Aşağıkarahacılı, Sorgun
- Aşağıkarakaya, Sorgun
- Ayrıdam, Sorgun
- Ayvalık, Sorgun
- Babalı, Sorgun
- Bağlarbaşı, Sorgun
- Bahadın, Sorgun
- Belencumafakılı, Sorgun
- Boğazcumafakılı, Sorgun
- Büyükeynelli, Sorgun
- Büyükkışla, Sorgun
- Büyükören, Sorgun
- Büyüktaşlık, Sorgun
- Caferli, Sorgun
- Cihanşarlı, Sorgun
- Çakırhacılı, Sorgun
- Çamurlu, Sorgun
- Çatmasöğüt, Sorgun
- Çavuşköyü, Sorgun
- Çayözü, Sorgun
- Çiğdemli, Sorgun
- Dişli, Sorgun
- Doğankent, Sorgun
- Doğanlı, Sorgun
- Emirhan, Sorgun
- Emirler, Sorgun
- Eymir, Sorgun
- Faraşlı, Sorgun
- Garipler, Sorgun
- Gedikhasanlı, Sorgun
- Gevrek, Sorgun
- Gökiniş, Sorgun
- Gököz, Sorgun
- Gözbaba, Sorgun
- Gülşehri, Sorgun
- Güngören, Sorgun
- Günpınar, Sorgun
- Günyazı, Sorgun
- Halilfakılı, Sorgun
- İdrisli, Sorgun
- İkikara, Sorgun
- İncesu, Sorgun
- İsafakılı, Sorgun
- Kapaklı, Sorgun
- Karabalı, Sorgun
- Karaburun, Sorgun
- Karakız, Sorgun
- Karakocaoğlu, Sorgun
- Karalık, Sorgun
- Karaveli, Sorgun
- Kayakışla, Sorgun
- Kepirce, Sorgun
- Keser, Sorgun
- Kodallı, Sorgun
- Kodallıçiftliği, Sorgun
- Küçükeynelli, Sorgun
- Küçükköhne, Sorgun
- Küçüktaşlık, Sorgun
- Külhüyük, Sorgun
- Mansuroğlu, Sorgun
- Mehmetbeyli, Sorgun
- Mirahor, Sorgun
- Muğallı, Sorgun
- Ocaklı, Sorgun
- Osmaniye, Sorgun
- Peyniryemez, Sorgun
- Sarıhacılı, Sorgun
- Sarıhamzalı, Sorgun
- Sivri, Sorgun
- Şahmuratlı, Sorgun
- Taşpınar, Sorgun
- Temrezli, Sorgun
- Tiftik, Sorgun
- Tulum, Sorgun
- Tuzlacık, Sorgun
- Veliöldük, Sorgun
- Yaycılar, Sorgun
- Yaylalık, Sorgun
- Yazılıtaş, Sorgun

== Şefaatli ==
- Şefaatli
- Akcami, Şefaatli
- Akçakoyunlu, Şefaatli
- Alifakılı, Şefaatli
- Arife, Şefaatli
- Armağan, Şefaatli
- Bağyazı, Şefaatli
- Başköy, Şefaatli
- Caferli, Şefaatli
- Cankılı, Şefaatli
- Cıcıklar, Şefaatli
- Çaydoğan, Şefaatli
- Dedeli, Şefaatli
- Deliler, Şefaatli
- Ekinciuşağı, Şefaatli
- Gülistan, Şefaatli
- Gülpınar, Şefaatli
- Gözelli, Şefaatli
- Halaçlı, Şefaatli
- Hamzalı, Şefaatli
- Hüyükkışla, Şefaatli
- İbrahimhacılı, Şefaatli
- Kabacaoğlu, Şefaatli
- Kabakini, Şefaatli
- Karakaya, Şefaatli
- Karalar, Şefaatli
- Kaykılı, Şefaatli
- Kazlıuşağı, Şefaatli
- Kızılkoca, Şefaatli
- Kızılyar, Şefaatli
- Koçköy, Şefaatli
- Konaklı, Şefaatli
- Kumkuyu, Şefaatli
- Kuzayca, Şefaatli
- Küçükincirli, Şefaatli
- Paşaköy, Şefaatli
- Saatli, Şefaatli
- Saçlı, Sefaatli
- Sarıkent, Şefaatli
- Şerefoğlu, Şefaatli
- Tahiroğlu, Şefaatli
- Temlik, Şefaatli
- Türüdüler, Şefaatli
- Yıldızköy, Şefaatli

== Yenifakılı ==
- Yenifakılı
- Başpınar, Yenifakılı
- Bektaşlı, Yenifakılı
- Çöplüçiftliği, Yenifakılı
- Eskiören, Yenifakılı
- Fehimli, Yenifakılı
- Üçobalar, Yenifakılı
- Yiğitler, Yenifakılı

== Yerköy ==
- Yerköy
- Akpınar, Yerköy
- Arifeoğlu, Yerköy
- Arslanhacılı, Yerköy
- Aşağıeğerci, Yerköy
- Aşağıelmahacılı, Yerköy
- Aydıngün, Yerköy
- Belkavak, Yerköy
- Beserek, Yerköy
- Bicikler, Yerköy
- Buruncuk, Yerköy
- Cakcak, Yerköy
- Çakırhacılı, Yerköy
- Çakırlar, Yerköy
- Çalıklı, Yerköy
- Çamdibi, Yerköy
- Çamlıbel, Yerköy
- Çayköy, Yerköy
- Delice, Yerköy
- Derebağı, Yerköy
- Derecik, Yerköy
- Göçerli, Yerköy
- Gündoğdu, Yerköy
- Hacıçeşmesi, Yerköy
- Hacılı, Yerköy
- Hacımusalı, Yerköy
- Hacıosmanlı, Yerköy
- Hacıuşağı, Yerköy
- Hatip, Yerköy
- Kahyaköy, Yerköy
- Karacaağaç, Yerköy
- Karacaahmetli, Yerköy
- Karaosmanoğlu, Yerköy
- Karlı, Yerköy
- Kayadibi, Yerköy
- Kocaoğlu, Yerköy
- Kömüşören, Yerköy
- Kördeve, Yerköy
- Köycü, Yerköy
- Kumluca, Yerköy
- Küçükçalıklı, Yerköy
- Küçüknefes, Yerköy
- Orhan, Yerköy
- Poyraz, Yerköy
- Salihli, Yerköy
- Saray, Yerköy
- Sarıyaprak, Yerköy
- Sedir, Yerköy
- Sekili, Yerköy
- Susuz, Yerköy
- Süleymanlı, Yerköy
- Terzili, Yerköy
- Topaç, Yerköy
- Yakuplu, Yerköy
- Yerköy, Yerköy
- Yukarıeğerci, Yerköy
- Yukarıelmahacılı, Yerköy
- Yukarıihsangazili, Yerköy
- Zencir, Yerköy
