= Akdağmadeni District =

District of Yozgat Province, Turkey

- District
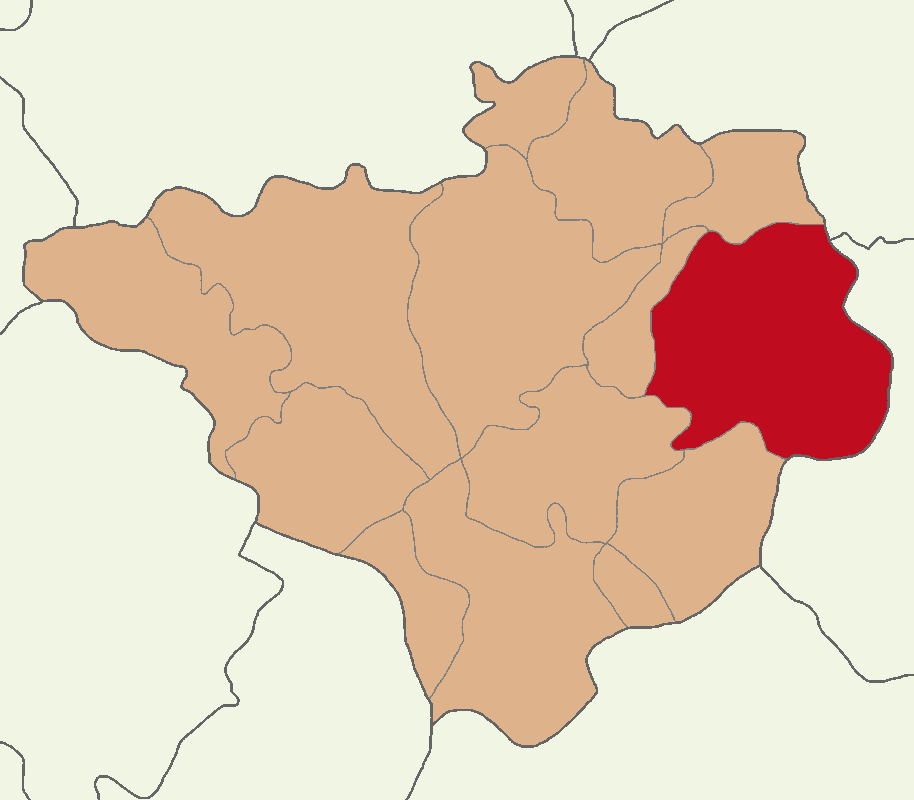
- Map showing Akdağmadeni District in Yozgat Province

- Location within Turkey Location within Turkey Central Anatolia
- Coordinates: 39°40′N 35°53′E
- Country: Turkey
- Province: Yozgat
- Seat: Kadışehri

Government
  - Kaymakam: Fatih Topuz
- Area: 1,810 km^{2} (700 sq mi)
- Population (2022): 41,577
  - Density: 23.0/km^{2} (59.5/sq mi)
- Time zone: UTC+3 (TRT)
- Website: www.akdagmadeni.gov.tr

Akdağmadeni District is a district of the Yozgat Province of Turkey. Its seat is the town of Akdağmadeni. Its area is 1,810 km^{2}, and its population is 41,577 (2022). The district of Akdağmadeni is located in the east of the Yozgat province. It is surrounded to the north by the district of Kadışehri, in the south by Çayıralan, Sarikaya and Saraykent in the west and the Sarkisla district in the east.

== Climate ==
The district is situated in the central Anatolian plateau and shares its climatic peculiarities. Summers are very hot, winters are not extremely cold. Snowfall can be detected as soon as in mid-November. The average annual rainfall lies between 478 and 500 millimeters. In summer, temperatures are between 20 and 25 degrees Celsius. The annual average temperature varies between 8 and 12 degrees. Generally, the climate is quite damp. Winds blow mostly from the east and south.

== Composition ==
There are two municipalities in Akdağmadeni District:

- Akdağmadeni
- Belekçehan
- Oluközü
- Umutlu

There are 78 villages in Akdağmadeni District:

- Abdurrahmanlı
- Ağaçlı
- Akbaş
- Akçakışla
- Akçakoyunlu
- Alicik
- Altılı
- Ardıçalanı
- Arpalık
- Arslanlı
- Aşağıçulhalı
- Bahçecik
- Başçatak
- Boğazköy
- Boyalık
- Bozhüyük
- Bulgurlu
- Çağlayan
- Çampınar
- Çardak
- Çaypınar
- Çerçialanı
- Davulbaz
- Davutlu
- Dayılı
- Demirşeyh
- Dereyurt
- Dokuzköy
- Dolak
- Evci
- Eynelli
- Gökdere
- Güllük
- Gümüşdibek
- Gündüzler
- Hacıfakılı
- Halhacı
- Hayran
- Hüyüklüalanı
- İbrahimağaçiftliği
- Karaalikaçağı
- Karacaören
- Karadikmen
- Karapir
- Kartal
- Kayabaşı
- Kayakışla
- Kılıçlı
- Kırlar
- Kirsinkavağı
- Kızılcaova
- Kızıldağ
- Körük
- Kuşlukaçağı
- Melikli
- Muşalikalesi
- Okçulu
- Örenkale
- Ortaköy
- Özer
- Paşabey
- Pazarcık
- Sağıroğlu
- Şahnaderesi
- Sarıgüney
- Sazlıdere
- Sekikaşı
- Tarhana
- Taşpınar
- Tekkegüney
- Üçkaraağaç
- Uzakçay
- Veziralanı
- Yazılıtaş
- Yedişehri
- Yeniyapan
- Yukarıçulhalı
- Yünalanı
