= Boğazlıyan District =

District of Yozgat Province, Turkey

- District
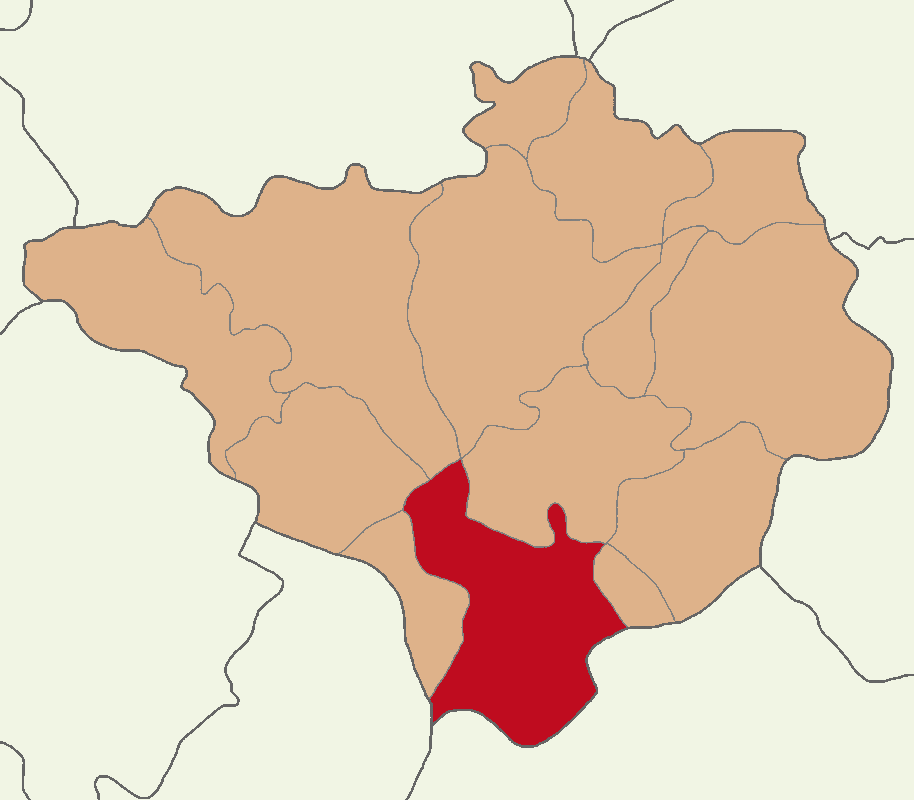
- Map showing Boğazlıyan District in Yozgat Province

- Location in Turkey Boğazlıyan District (Turkey Central Anatolia)
- Coordinates: 39°12′N 35°15′E
- Country: Turkey
- Province: Yozgat
- Seat: Boğazlıyan

Government
  - Kaymakam: Recep Aydın
- Area: 1,515 km^{2} (585 sq mi)
- Population (2022): 33,892
  - Density: 22/km^{2} (58/sq mi)
- Time zone: UTC+3 (TRT)
- Website: www.bogazliyan.gov.tr

Boğazlıyan District is a district of the Yozgat Province of Turkey. Its seat is the town of Boğazlıyan. Its area is 1,515 km^{2}, and its population is 33,892 (2022). Neighbouring districts are Sarıkaya on the north, Yenifakılı on the west, Çandır and Çayıralan on the east.

== Composition ==
There are 6 municipalities in Boğazlıyan District:

- Boğazlıyan
- Ovakent
- Sırçalı
- Uzunlu
- Yamaçlı
- Yenipazar

There are 22 villages in Boğazlıyan District:

- Abdilli
- Bahariye
- Başhoroz
- Belören
- Çakmak
- Çalapverdi
- Dereçepni
- Devecipınar
- Esentepe
- Gövdecili
- Güveçli
- Karakuyu
- Müftükışla
- Oğulcuk
- Özler
- Poyrazlı
- Yapalak
- Yazıçepni
- Yazıkışla
- Yenikışla
- Yeşilhisar
- Yoğunhisar
