= Kadışehri District =

District of Yozgat Province, Turkey

- District
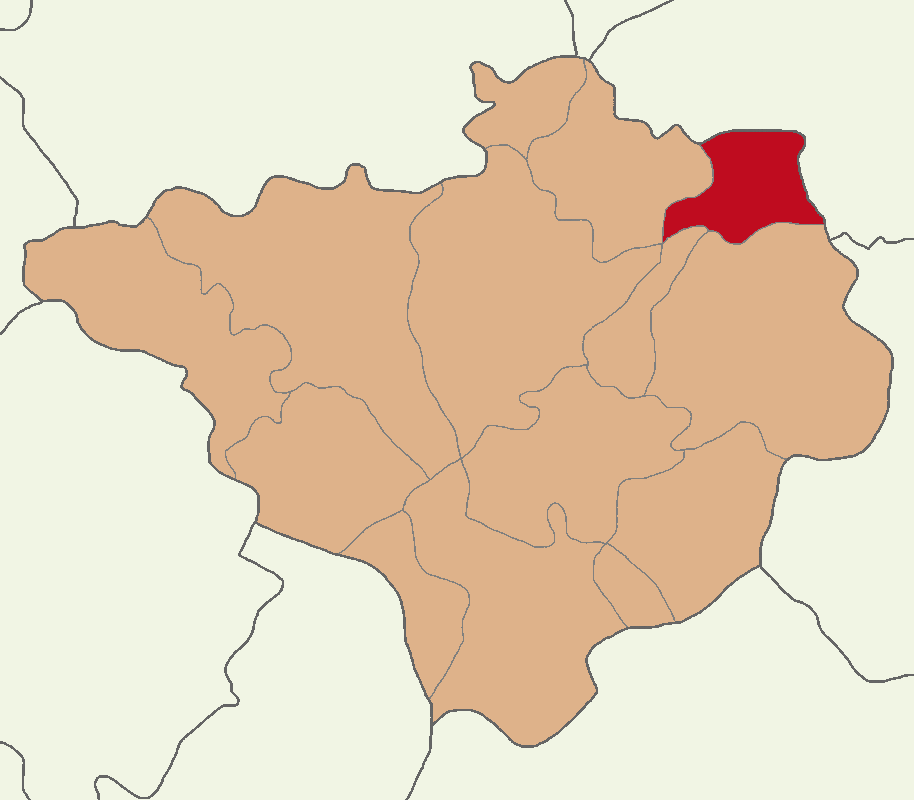
- Map showing Kadışehri District in Yozgat Province

- Location in Turkey Kadışehri District (Turkey Central Anatolia)
- Coordinates: 39°59′N 35°49′E
- Country: Turkey
- Province: Yozgat
- Seat: Kadışehri

Government
  - Kaymakam: Yunus Polat
- Area: 472 km^{2} (182 sq mi)
- Population (2022): 10,004
  - Density: 21/km^{2} (55/sq mi)
- Time zone: UTC+3 (TRT)
- Website: www.kadisehri.gov.tr

Kadışehri District is a district of the Yozgat Province of Turkey. Its seat is the town of Kadışehri. Its area is 472 km^{2}, and its population is 10,004 (2022). Neighbouring districts are Zile on the north, Akdağmadeni and Saraykent on the south, Çekerek on the west and Sulusaray on the east.

== Composition ==
There are two municipalities in Kadışehri District:

- Halıköy
- Kadışehri

There are 19 villages in Kadışehri District:

- Akçakale
- Aşağıkızılöz
- Buzluk
- Çamsaray
- Derbent
- Dikmesöğüt
- Elmalıçiftliği
- Elmalıütüğü
- Gümüşsu
- Hanözü
- Kabalı
- Kemalli
- Kıyılı
- Örencik
- Ovacık
- Seyhan
- Yanık
- Yavıhasan
- Yelten
