= Sarıkaya District =

District of Yozgat Province, Turkey

- District
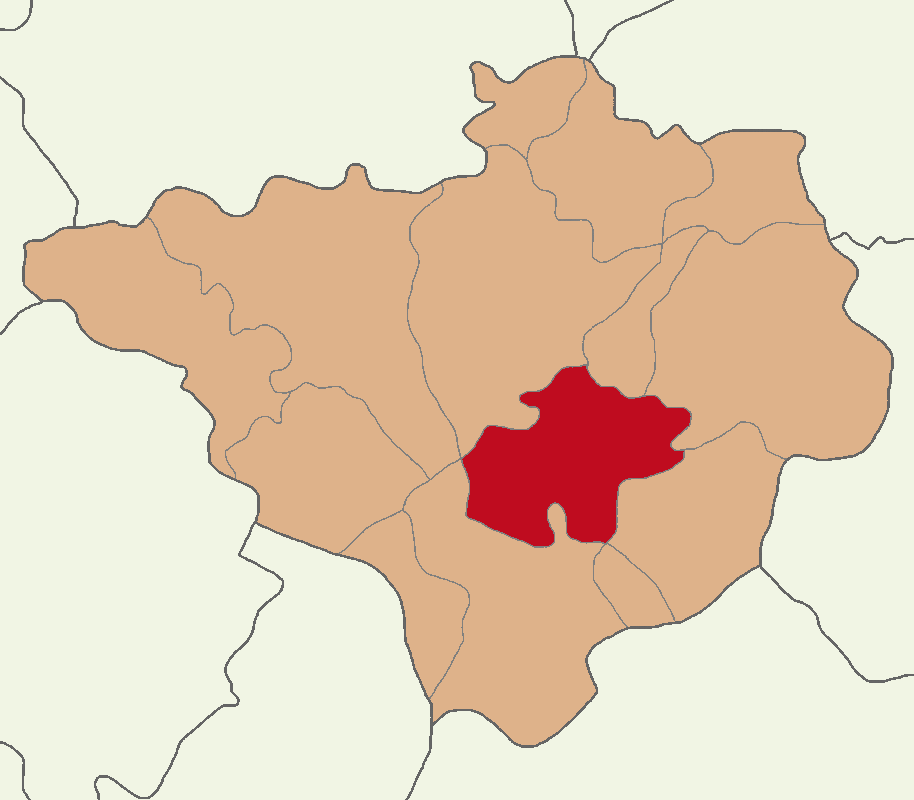
- Map showing Sarıkaya District in Yozgat Province

- Location in Turkey Sarıkaya District (Turkey Central Anatolia)
- Coordinates: 39°30′N 35°23′E
- Country: Turkey
- Province: Yozgat
- Seat: Sarıkaya

Government
  - Kaymakam: Samet Serin
- Area: 1,018 km^{2} (393 sq mi)
- Population (2022): 32,175
  - Density: 32/km^{2} (82/sq mi)
- Time zone: UTC+3 (TRT)
- Website: www.sarikaya.gov.tr

Sarıkaya District is a district of the Yozgat Province of Turkey. Its seat is the town of Sarıkaya. Its area is 1,018 km^{2}, and its population is 32,175 (2022).

== Composition ==
There are two municipalities in Sarıkaya District:

- Karayakup
- Sarıkaya

There are 56 villages in Sarıkaya District:

- Akbenli
- Akbucak
- Akçadam
- Alembey
- Alifakılı
- Arpalık
- Azapbaşılı
- Babayağmur
- Bağlıca
- Baraklı
- Bebekköy
- Boyalık
- Burunkışla
- Büyükçalağıl
- Çatak
- Çokumeşme
- Deredoğan
- Derekaplancı
- Doğansaray
- Emirbey
- Erbek
- Gülpınar
- Gündüzlü
- Hasbek
- Hisarbey
- Ilısu
- İnevi
- İnkışla Celalhüyüğü
- Kadıgüllü
- Kadılı
- Karabacak
- Karacalar
- Karaelli
- Karahallı
- Kargalık
- Kemallı
- Kerpiççik
- Koçak
- Koççağız
- Konurlu
- Küçükçalağıl
- Kürkçü
- Mescitli
- Pınarkaya
- Ramazanlı
- Selimli
- Söylemez
- Tepedoğan
- Tomarcahüyüğü
- Topaktaş
- Toprakpınar
- Ürkütlü
- Yahyalı
- Yaylagül
- Yazıkaplancı
- Yukarısarıkaya
