= Aydıncık District, Yozgat =

District of Yozgat Province, Turkey

Aydıncık District
- District
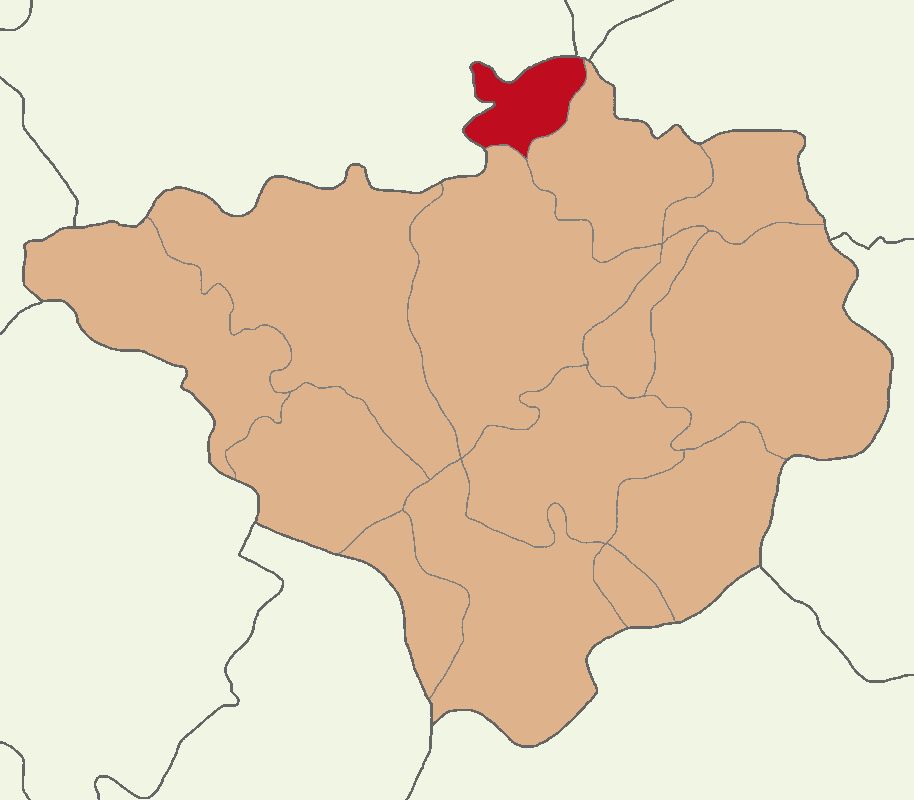
- Map showing Aydıncık District in Yozgat Province

- Location in Turkey Aydıncık District (Turkey Central Anatolia)
- Coordinates: 40°07′N 35°16′E
- Country: Turkey
- Province: Yozgat
- Seat: Aydıncık

Government
  - Kaymakam: Mustafa Turan
- Area: 338 km^{2} (131 sq mi)
- Population (2022): 11,552
  - Density: 34/km^{2} (89/sq mi)
- Time zone: UTC+3 (TRT)
- Website: www.yozgataydincik.gov.tr

Aydıncık District is a district of the Yozgat Province of Turkey. Its seat is the town of Aydıncık. Its area is 338 km^{2}, and its population is 11,552 (2022).

== Composition ==
There are two municipalities in Aydıncık District:

- Aydıncık
- Baydiğin

There are 22 villages in Aydıncık District:

- Ağıllı
- Aşağıkuyucak
- Bakırboğazı
- Benlioğlu
- Boğazkaya
- Büyüktoraman
- Dereçiftlik
- Güroğlu
- Hacıilyas
- Kazankaya
- Kırımoluk
- Kıyıkışla
- Kızılcakışla
- Kocabekir
- Kösrelik
- Küçüktoraman
- Kuşsaray
- Kuyuköy
- Mercimekören
- Mollaismail
- Sakızlık
- Üzümlük
