= Şefaatli District =

District of Yozgat Province, Turkey

- District
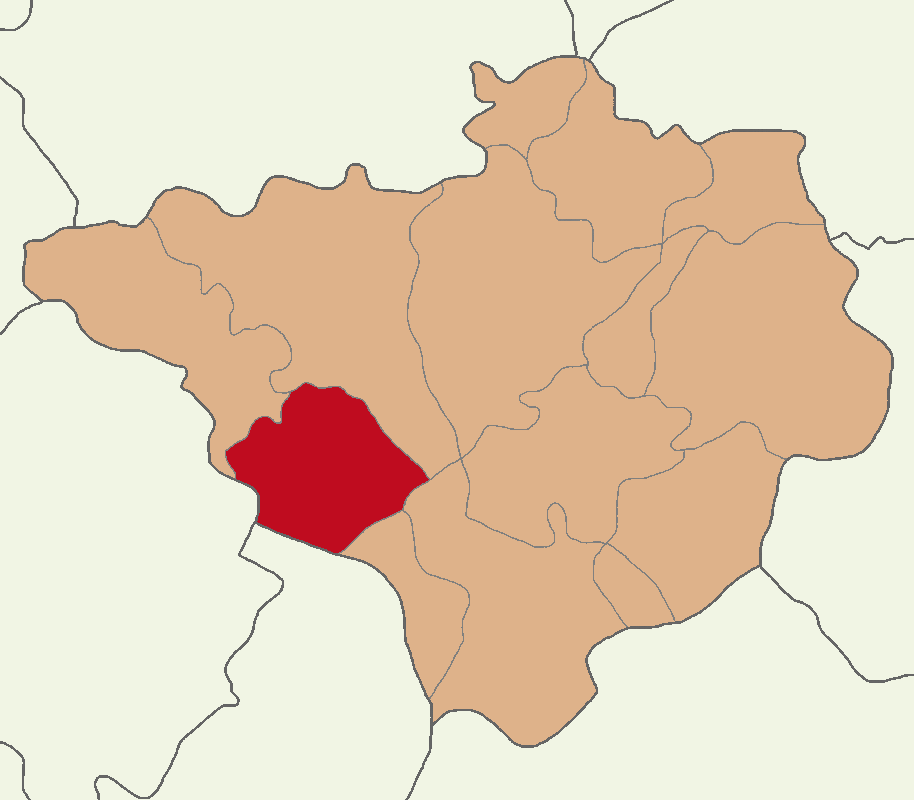
- Map showing Şefaatli District in Yozgat Province

- Location in Turkey Şefaatli District (Turkey Central Anatolia)
- Coordinates: 39°30′N 34°45′E
- Country: Turkey
- Province: Yozgat
- Seat: Şefaatli

Government
  - Kaymakam: Yusuf Ilıca
- Area: 882 km^{2} (341 sq mi)
- Population (2022): 14,129
  - Density: 16/km^{2} (41/sq mi)
- Time zone: UTC+3 (TRT)
- Website: www.sefaatli.gov.tr

Şefaatli District is a district of the Yozgat Province of Turkey. Its seat is the town of Şefaatli. Its area is 882 km^{2}, and its population is 14,129 (2022).

== Composition ==
There is one municipality in Şefaatli District:

- Şefaatli

There are 41 villages in Şefaatli District:

- Akcami
- Akçakoyunlu
- Alifakılı
- Arife
- Armağan
- Başköy
- Caferli
- Cankılı
- Çaydoğan
- Cıcıklar
- Dedeli
- Ekinciuşağı
- Gülistan
- Gülpınar
- Güzelli
- Hallaçlı
- Hamzalı
- Hüyükkışla
- İbrahimhacılı
- Kabacıoğlu
- Kabakini
- Karakaya
- Kaygılı
- Kazlıuşağı
- Kızılkoca
- Kızılyar
- Koçköy
- Küçükincirli
- Kumkuyu
- Kuzayca
- Osmanlı
- Paşaköy
- Rızvan
- Saatlı
- Saçlı
- Sarıkent
- Şerefoğlu
- Tahiroğlu
- Temlik
- Türüdüler
- Yıldızköy
