= Saraykent District =

District of Yozgat Province, Turkey

- District
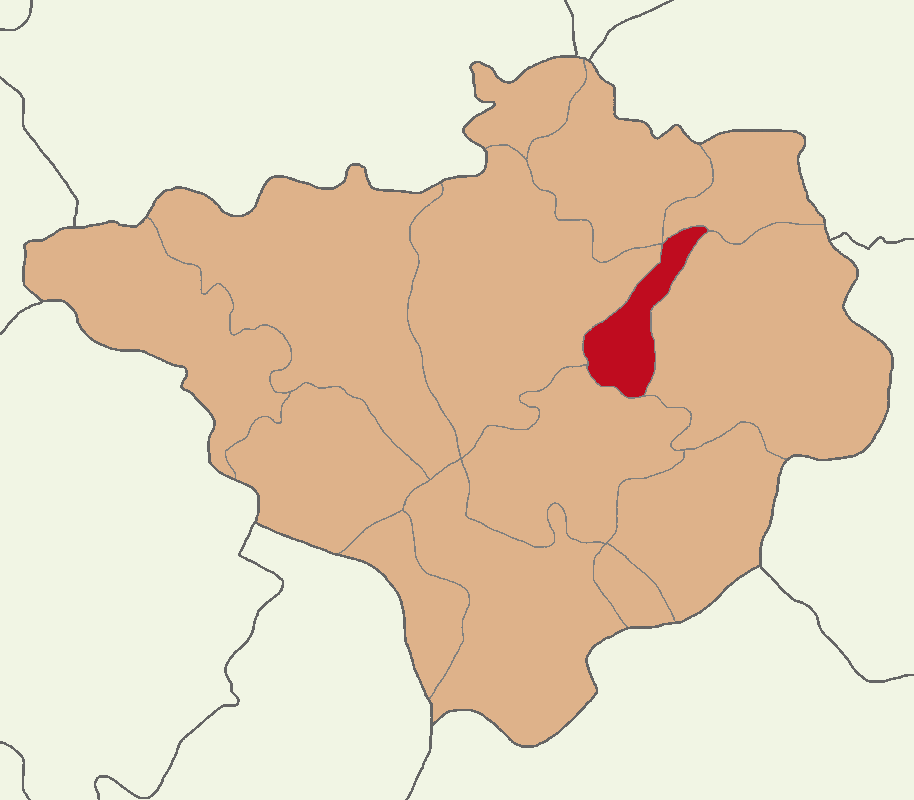
- Map showing Saraykent District in Yozgat Province

- Location in Turkey Saraykent District (Turkey Central Anatolia)
- Coordinates: 39°42′N 35°31′E
- Country: Turkey
- Province: Yozgat
- Seat: Saraykent

Government
  - Kaymakam: Ali Açıkgöz
- Area: 319 km^{2} (123 sq mi)
- Population (2022): 11,966
  - Density: 38/km^{2} (97/sq mi)
- Time zone: UTC+3 (TRT)
- Website: www.saraykent.gov.tr

Saraykent District is a district of the Yozgat Province of Turkey. Its seat is the town of Saraykent. Its area is 319 km^{2}, and its population is 11,966 (2022).

== Composition ==
There are three municipalities in Saraykent District:

- Dedefakılı
- Ozan
- Saraykent

There are 12 villages in Saraykent District:

- Altınsu
- Başpınar
- Benli
- Beşkavak
- Çiçekli
- Çiçeklihüyüğü
- İzibüyük
- Kamberli
- Kesikköprü
- Kösealili
- Parmaksız
- Söğütlü
