= Baydiğin =

- Municipality
- Location in Turkey Baydiğin (Turkey Central Anatolia)
- Coordinates: 40°13′12″N 35°09′43″E
- Country: Turkey
- Province: Yozgat
- District: Aydıncık
- Population (2022): 3,100
- Time zone: UTC+3 (TRT)

Baydiğin is a town (belde) in the Aydıncık District, Yozgat Province, Turkey. Its population is 3,100 (2022).
