= Çayıralan District =

District of Yozgat Province, Turkey

- District
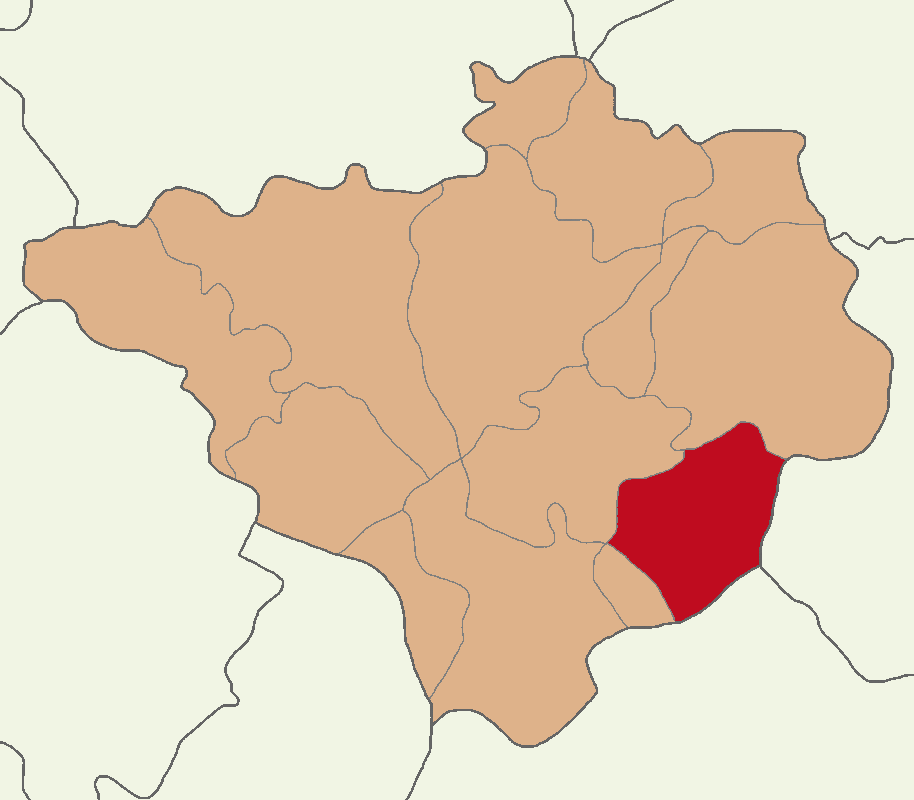
- Map showing Çayıralan District in Yozgat Province

- Location in Turkey Çayıralan District (Turkey Central Anatolia)
- Coordinates: 39°22′N 35°41′E
- Country: Turkey
- Province: Yozgat
- Seat: Çayıralan

Government
  - Kaymakam: Mustafa Çelik
- Area: 995 km^{2} (384 sq mi)
- Population (2022): 12,109
  - Density: 12/km^{2} (32/sq mi)
- Time zone: UTC+3 (TRT)
- Website: www.cayiralan.gov.tr

Çayıralan District is a district of the Yozgat Province of Turkey. Its seat is the town of Çayıralan. Its area is 995 km^{2}, and its population is 12,109 (2022). The district has one of the largest forest areas in Central Anatolia. It also possesses marble mines.

== Composition ==
There are two municipalities in Çayıralan District:

- Çayıralan
- Konuklar

There are 23 villages in Çayıralan District:

- Alidemirci
- Aşağıtekke
- Aşağıyahyasaray
- Avşaralanı
- Çukurören
- Curali
- Derekemal
- Elçi
- Evciler
- Fahralı
- Gülderesi
- Günyayla
- Güzelyayla
- İnönü
- Kaletepe
- Karaazap
- Karakışla
- Külekçi
- Menteşe
- Söbeçimen
- Turluhan
- Yukarıtekke
- Yukarıyahyasaray
