= Sorgun District =

District of Yozgat Province, Turkey

- District
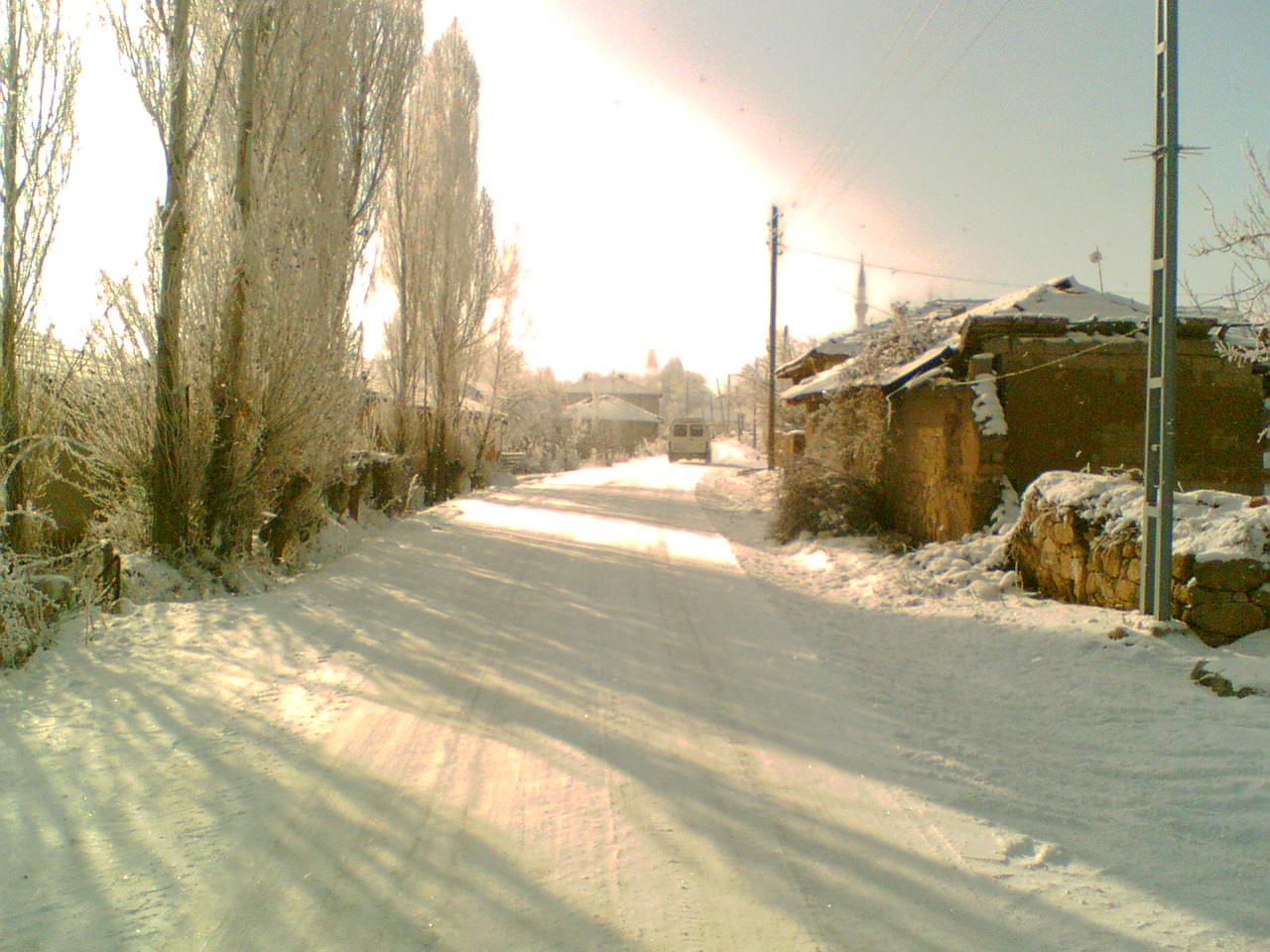
- Ayrıdam, a village in Sorgun District

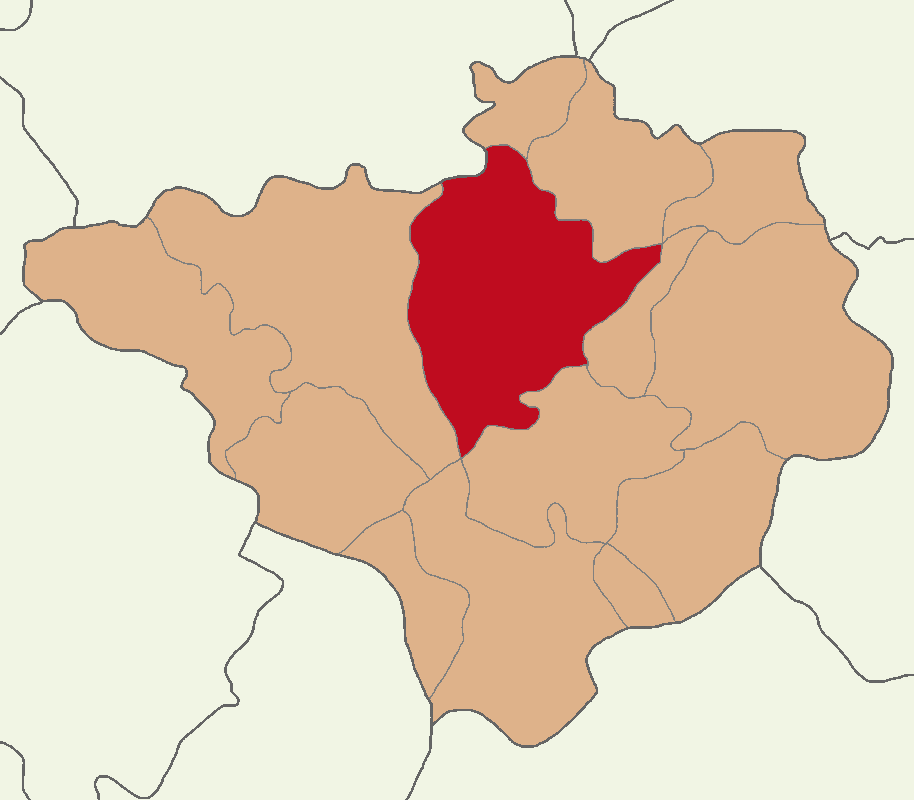
- Map showing Sorgun District in Yozgat Province

- Location within Turkey Location within Turkey Central Anatolia
- Coordinates: 39°49′N 35°11′E
- Country: Turkey
- Province: Yozgat
- Seat: Sorgun

Government
  - Kaymakam: Halil İbrahim Kazar
- Area: 1,768 km^{2} (683 sq mi)
- Population (2022): 79,977
  - Density: 45.24/km^{2} (117.2/sq mi)
- Time zone: UTC+3 (TRT)
- Website: www.sorgun.gov.tr

Sorgun District is a district of the Yozgat Province of Turkey. Its seat is the city of Sorgun. Its area is 1,768 km^{2}, and its population is 79,977 (2022).

== Composition ==
There are 8 municipalities in Sorgun District:

- Araplı
- Bahadın
- Çiğdemli
- Doğankent
- Eymir
- Gülşehri
- Sorgun
- Yeniyer

There are 75 villages in Sorgun District:

- Ağcın
- Akoluk
- Alcı
- Alişar
- Aşağıcumafakılı
- Aşağıemirler
- Aşağıkarahacılı
- Aşağıkarakaya
- Ayrıdam
- Babalı
- Bağlarbaşı
- Belencumafakılı
- Boğazcumafakılı
- Büyükeynelli
- Büyükkışla
- Büyükören
- Büyüktaşlık
- Caferli
- Çakırhacılı
- Çamurlu
- Çavuşköyü
- Çayözü
- Cihanşarlı
- Dişli
- Doğanlı
- Emirhan
- Emirler
- Erkekli
- Garipler
- Gedikhasanlı
- Gevrek
- Gökiniş
- Gököz
- Gözbaba
- Güngören
- Günpınar
- Günyazı
- Halilfakılı
- İdrisli
- İkikara
- İncesu
- İsafakılı
- Kapaklı
- Karaabalı
- Karaburun
- Karakocaoğlu
- Karalık
- Karaveli
- Karlık Ayvalık
- Kepirce
- Keser
- Kodallı
- Kodallıçiftliği
- Küçükeynelli
- Küçükköhne
- Küçüktaşlık
- Külhüyük
- Mansuroğlu
- Mehmetbeyli
- Mirahor
- Muğallı
- Ocaklı
- Osmaniye
- Peyniryemez
- Şahmuratlı
- Sarıhacılı
- Sarıhamzalı
- Sivri
- Taşpınar
- Temrezli
- Tiftik
- Tulum
- Tuzlacık
- Veliöldüğü
- Yazılıtaş
