= Çekerek District =

District of Yozgat Province, Turkey

- District
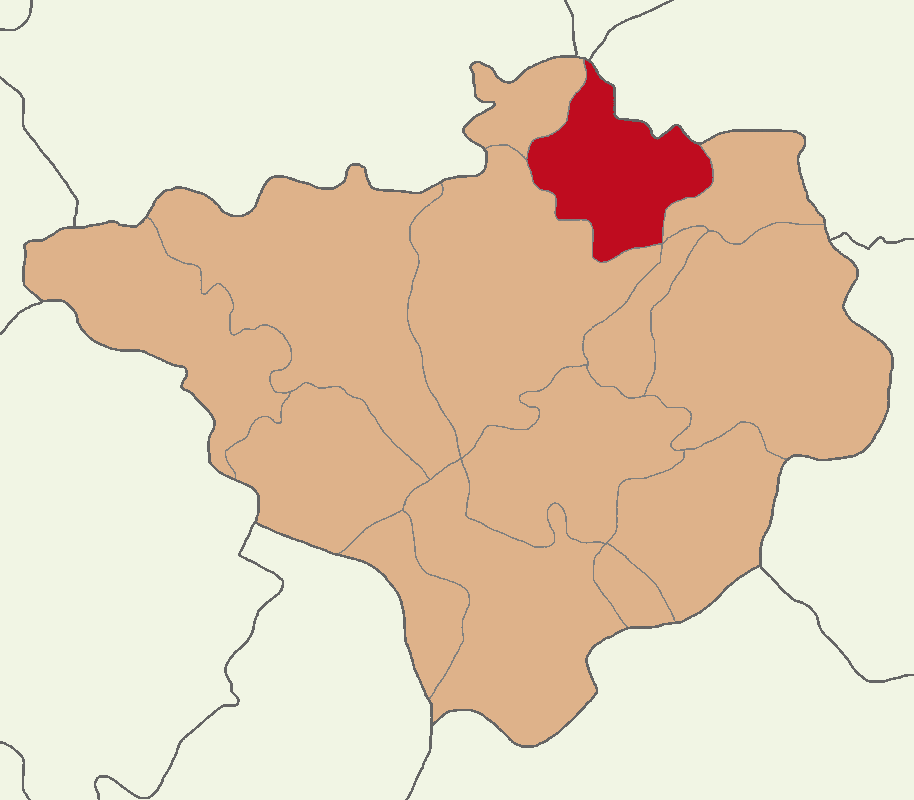
- Map showing Çekerek District in Yozgat Province

- Location in Turkey Çekerek District (Turkey Central Anatolia)
- Coordinates: 40°04′N 35°30′E
- Country: Turkey
- Province: Yozgat
- Seat: Çekerek

Government
  - Kaymakam: Hayrettin Buğra Güzel
- Area: 790 km^{2} (310 sq mi)
- Population (2022): 18,245
  - Density: 23/km^{2} (60/sq mi)
- Time zone: UTC+3 (TRT)
- Website: www.cekerek.gov.tr

Çekerek District is a district of the Yozgat Province of Turkey. Its seat is the town of Çekerek. Its area is 790 km^{2}, and its population is 18,245 (2022).

== Composition ==
There are two municipalities in Çekerek District:

- Çekerek
- Özükavak

There are 41 villages in Çekerek District:

- Alıçlı
- Arpaç
- Başalan
- Başpınar
- Bayındırhüyük
- Bazlambaç
- Beyyurdu
- Çakırköy
- Çandır
- Çayırözü
- Çeltek
- Cemaloğlu
- Demircialan
- Doğanoğlu
- Elemin
- Fakıdağı
- Fuadiye
- Gökdere
- Gönülyurdu
- Hamzalı
- İkizce
- İlbeyli
- İsaklı
- Kalederesi
- Kamışcık
- Karahacılı
- Karakaya
- Kavakalanı
- Kayalar
- Kırkdilim
- Körpınar
- Koyunculu
- Kurtağılı
- Kuruçay
- Kuzgun
- Mehmetli
- Ortaoba
- Özören
- Sarıköy
- Tipideresi
- Yukarıoba
