= Alişar, Sorgun =

Alişar
- Village
- Location within Turkey Location within Turkey Central Anatolia
- Coordinates: 39°36′22″N 35°15′41″E
- Country: Turkey
- Province: Yozgat
- District: Sorgun
- Population (2022): 71
- Time zone: UTC+3 (TRT)

Alişar is a village in the Sorgun District of the Yozgat Province in Turkey. Its population is 71 (2022). Near the village is the archaeological site of Alişar Hüyük.

== Alişar Hüyük ==
The site was settled from the Chalcolithic period in the fourth millennium BCE until the Phrygian period in the first millennium BCE. During the Early and Middle Bronze Age in the third millennium BCE Alişar developed into a walled town. Eventually, it became the most significant city in the region. Like Kanesh (Kültepe) to the south, it was a center for trade attracting merchants from Assyria at the beginning of the second millennium BCE. The city was then destroyed, and this may have been the conquest by the semi-legendary Hittite king Anitta. He is told to have conquered the city of Kussara which can be identified with Alişar Hüyük. The Hittites later made Hattusa to the north their capital. By the Hittite empire period 1400-1200 BCE Alişar was nothing but a small provincial town probably known as Ankuwa. Like most Hittite settlements it was burnt and destroyed at the end of the Late Bronze Age in the twelfth century BC. The Phrygians later occupied the site. In the vicinity of Alişar laid a large Phrygian Iron Age city at Kerkenes.

The site was first excavated 1927–1932 by the Oriental Institute, University of Chicago, headed by Hans Henning von der Osten. Artefacts from the site were brought to the Museum of Anatolian Civilizations in Ankara. Excavations restarted in 1992 by Turkish archaeologists through the TAY project.
