= Yerköy District =

District of Yozgat Province, Turkey

- District
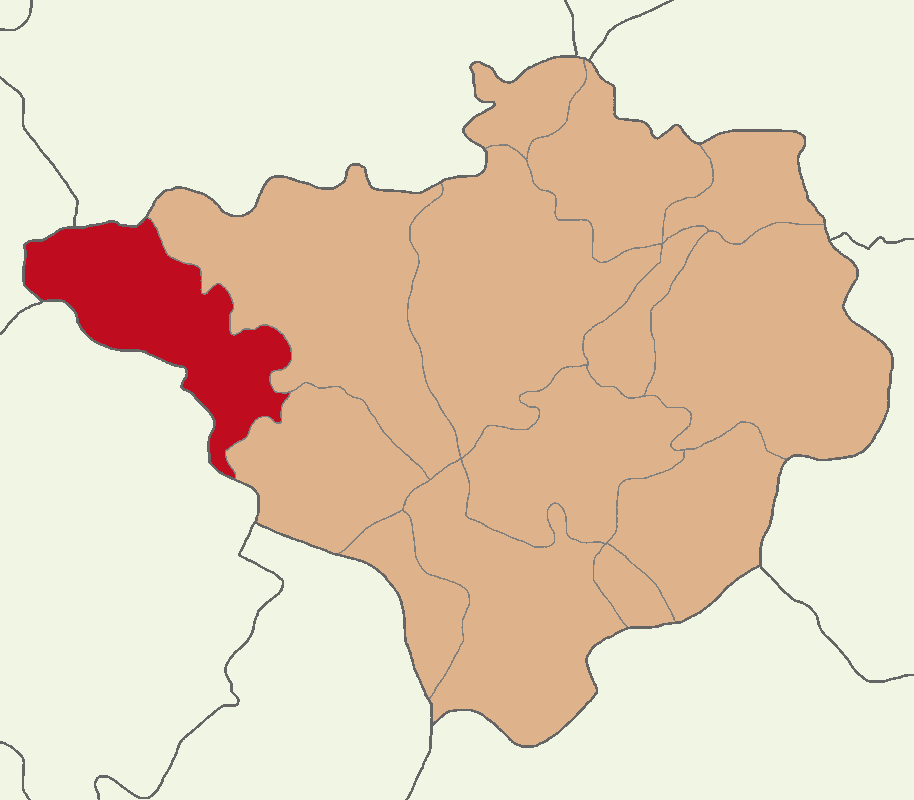
- Map showing Yerköy District in Yozgat Province

- Location in Turkey Yerköy District (Turkey Central Anatolia)
- Coordinates: 39°38′N 34°28′E
- Country: Turkey
- Province: Yozgat
- Seat: Yerköy

Government
  - Kaymakam: Muharrem Coşgun
- Area: 1,164 km^{2} (449 sq mi)
- Population (2022): 34,214
  - Density: 29/km^{2} (76/sq mi)
- Time zone: UTC+3 (TRT)
- Website: www.yerkoy.gov.tr

Yerköy District is a district of the Yozgat Province of Turkey. Its seat is the town of Yerköy. Its area is 1,164 km^{2}, and its population is 34,214 (2022).

== Composition ==
There is one municipality in Yerköy District:

- Yerköy

There are 60 villages in Yerköy District:

- Akpınar
- Arifeoğlu
- Arslanhacılı
- Aşağıelmahacılı
- Aşağıeyerci
- Aydıngün
- Belkavak
- Beserek
- Bicikler
- Buruncuk
- Cakcak
- Çakırhacılı
- Çakırlar
- Çalıklı
- Çamdibi
- Çamlıbel
- Çayköy
- Delice
- Derebağ
- Derecik
- Göçerli
- Gündoğdu
- Hacıçeşmesi
- Hacılı
- Hacımusalı
- Hacıosmanlı
- Hacıuşağı
- Hargaşan
- Hatip
- İğdecik
- Kahyaköy
- Karaağaç
- Karacaahmetli
- Karacaosmanoğlu
- Karlı
- Kayadibi
- Kocaoğlu
- Kömüşören
- Kördeve
- Köycü
- Küçükçalıklı
- Küçüknefes
- Kumluca
- Orhan
- Poyraz
- Salihli
- Saray
- Sarıyaprak
- Sedir
- Sekili
- Süleymanlı
- Susuz
- Terzili
- Topaç
- Yakuplu
- Yerköy
- Yukarıelmahacılı
- Yukarıeyerci
- Yukarıihsangazili
- Zincir
