= Yenifakılı District =

District of Yozgat Province, Turkey

- District
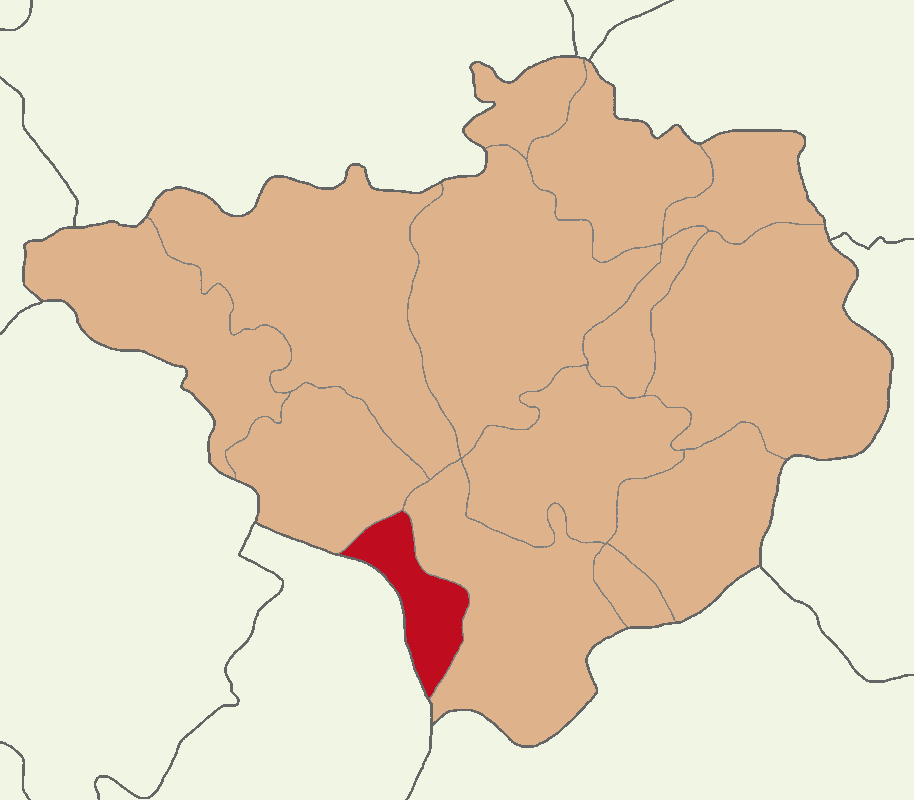
- Map showing Yenifakılı District in Yozgat Province

- Location in Turkey Yenifakılı District (Turkey Central Anatolia)
- Coordinates: 39°12′N 35°00′E
- Country: Turkey
- Province: Yozgat
- Seat: Yenifakılı

Government
  - Kaymakam: Mehmet Şirin Altay
- Area: 390 km^{2} (150 sq mi)
- Population (2022): 5,178
  - Density: 13/km^{2} (34/sq mi)
- Time zone: UTC+3 (TRT)
- Website: www.yenifakili.gov.tr

Yenifakılı District is a district of the Yozgat Province of Turkey. Its seat is the town of Yenifakılı. Its area is 390 km^{2}, and its population is 5,178 (2022).

== Composition ==
There is one municipality in Yenifakılı District:

- Yenifakılı

There are 7 villages in Yenifakılı District:

- Başpınar
- Bektaşlı
- Çöplüçiftliği
- Eskiören
- Fehimli
- Üçobalar
- Yiğitler
