= Umutlu, Akdağmadeni =

Umutlu
- Municipality
- Location in Turkey Umutlu (Turkey Central Anatolia)
- Coordinates: 39°45′35″N 35°37′04″E
- Country: Turkey
- Province: Yozgat
- District: Akdağmadeni
- Population (2022): 1,843
- Time zone: UTC+3 (TRT)

Umutlu is a town (belde) in the Akdağmadeni District, Yozgat Province, Turkey. Its population is 1,843 (2022).
