= Yerköy =

- Municipality
- Coat of arms

- Location in Turkey Yerköy (Turkey Central Anatolia)
- Coordinates: 39°38′17″N 34°28′02″E
- Country: Turkey
- Province: Yozgat
- District: Yerköy

Government
  - Mayor: Fatih Arslan (AKP)
- Elevation: 771 m (2,530 ft)
- Population (2022): 27,084
- Time zone: UTC+3 (TRT)
- Postal code: 66900
- Area code: 0354
- Website: www.yerkoy.bel.tr

Yerköy is a town in Yozgat Province in the Central Anatolia region of Turkey. It is the seat of Yerköy District. Its population is 27,084 (2022). Its elevation is 771 m (2,530 ft). The mayor is Fatih Arslan, Justice and Development Party (AKP).

== 2009 Great Union Party's rally ==
A rally of the Great Union Party (BBP) was scheduled at 17:00 EET (15:00 UTC) on March 25, 2009 in the town, at which party leader Muhsin Yazıcıoğlu was expected to hold a speech before the upcoming local elections. Yazıcıoğlu was underway from another rally in Çağlayancerit, Kahramanmaraş by a chartered helicopter. The helicopter crashed at Mount Keş in Göksun district of Kahramanmaraş Province, causing the death of the pilot and all five passengers. The crash site could be reached only two days later due to harsh weather conditions in the region.
