= Oluközü, Akdağmadeni =

Oluközü
- Municipality
- Location in Turkey Oluközü (Turkey Central Anatolia)
- Coordinates: 39°40′57″N 35°46′48″E
- Country: Turkey
- Province: Yozgat
- District: Akdağmadeni
- Population (2022): 1,282
- Time zone: UTC+3 (TRT)

Oluközü is a town (belde) in the Akdağmadeni District, Yozgat Province, Turkey. Its population is 1,282 (2022).
