= Belekçehan =

- Municipality
- Location in Turkey Belekçehan (Turkey Central Anatolia)
- Coordinates: 39°38′22″N 35°40′16″E
- Country: Turkey
- Province: Yozgat
- District: Akdağmadeni
- Population (2022): 2,090
- Time zone: UTC+3 (TRT)

Belekçehan is a town (belde) in the Akdağmadeni District, Yozgat Province, Turkey. Its population is 2,090 (2022).
