= Araplı, Sorgun =

Araplı
- Municipality
- Location in Turkey Araplı (Turkey Central Anatolia)
- Coordinates: 39°49′59″N 35°26′06″E
- Country: Turkey
- Province: Yozgat
- District: Sorgun
- Population (2022): 1,747
- Time zone: UTC+3 (TRT)

Araplı is a town (belde) in the Sorgun District, Yozgat Province, Turkey. Its population is 1,747 (2022).
