= Ovakent, Boğazlıyan =

Ovakent
- Municipality
- Location in Turkey Ovakent (Turkey Central Anatolia)
- Coordinates: 39°03′26″N 35°14′18″E
- Country: Turkey
- Province: Yozgat
- District: Boğazlıyan
- Population (2022): 2,134
- Time zone: UTC+3 (TRT)

Ovakent is a town (belde) in the Boğazlıyan District, Yozgat Province, Turkey. Its population is 2,134 (2022).
