= Aydıncık, Yozgat =

Aydıncık
- Municipality
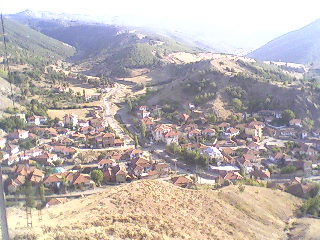

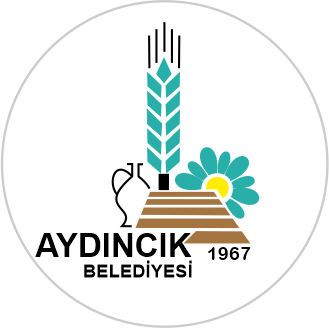
- Coat of arms

- Location within Turkey Location within Turkey Central Anatolia
- Coordinates: 40°07′N 35°16′E
- Country: Turkey
- Province: Yozgat
- District: Aydıncık

Government
  - Mayor: Mustafa Tekçam (AKP)
- Elevation: 850 m (2,790 ft)
- Population (2022): 2,935
- Time zone: UTC+3 (TRT)
- Postal code: 66540
- Area code: 0354
- Website: www.yozgataydincik.bel.tr

Aydıncık is a town in Yozgat Province in the Central Anatolia region of Turkey. It is the seat of Aydıncık District. Its population is 2,935 (2022).
