= Yeniyer, Sorgun =

Yeniyer
- Municipality
- Location in Turkey Yeniyer (Turkey Central Anatolia)
- Coordinates: 39°48′30″N 35°21′20″E
- Country: Turkey
- Province: Yozgat
- District: Sorgun
- Population (2022): 1,747
- Time zone: UTC+3 (TRT)

Yeniyer (before 2013: Karakız) is a town (belde) in the Sorgun District, Yozgat Province, Turkey. Its population is 1,747 (2022).
