= Konuklar, Çayıralan =

Konuklar
- Municipality
- Location in Turkey Konuklar (Turkey Central Anatolia)
- Coordinates: 39°24′31″N 35°34′19″E
- Country: Turkey
- Province: Yozgat
- District: Çayıralan
- Population (2022): 1,848
- Time zone: UTC+3 (TRT)

Konuklar is a town (belde) in the Çayıralan District, Yozgat Province, Turkey. Its population is 1,848 (2022).
