= Halıköy, Kadışehri =

Halıköy
- Municipality
- Location in Turkey Halıköy (Turkey Central Anatolia)
- Coordinates: 40°00′34″N 35°54′24″E
- Country: Turkey
- Province: Yozgat
- District: Kadışehri
- Population (2022): 1,777
- Time zone: UTC+3 (TRT)

Halıköy is a town (belde) in the Kadışehri District, Yozgat Province, Turkey. Its population is 1,777 (2022).
