= Boğazlıyan =

- Municipality
- Location in Turkey Boğazlıyan (Turkey Central Anatolia)
- Coordinates: 39°11′39″N 35°14′50″E
- Country: Turkey
- Province: Yozgat
- District: Boğazlıyan

Government
  - Mayor: Gökhan Çoşar (AKP)
- Elevation: 1,066 m (3,497 ft)
- Population (2022): 18,791
- Time zone: UTC+3 (TRT)
- Postal code: 66400
- Area code: 0354
- Website: www.bogazliyan.bel.tr

Boğazlıyan is a town in Yozgat Province in the Central Anatolia region of Turkey. It is the seat of Boğazlıyan District. Its population is 18,791 (2022). Its elevation is 1,066 m (3,497 ft).

== Climate ==
Boğazlıyan has a dry-summer humid continental climate (Köppen: Dsb), bordering a cold semi-arid climate (Köppen: BSk) with warm, dry summers and cold winters.

Climate data for Boğazlıyan (1991–2020)
Month	Jan	Feb	Mar	Apr	May	Jun	Jul	Aug	Sep	Oct	Nov	Dec	Year
Mean daily maximum °C (°F)	3.9 (39.0)	5.9 (42.6)	11.4 (52.5)	16.8 (62.2)	21.6 (70.9)	26.1 (79.0)	29.7 (85.5)	29.9 (85.8)	25.8 (78.4)	19.8 (67.6)	12.2 (54.0)	6.2 (43.2)	17.5 (63.5)
Daily mean °C (°F)	−1.4 (29.5)	−0.3 (31.5)	4.6 (40.3)	9.5 (49.1)	13.9 (57.0)	17.9 (64.2)	21.0 (69.8)	21.1 (70.0)	16.4 (61.5)	11.2 (52.2)	4.4 (39.9)	0.7 (33.3)	10.0 (50.0)
Mean daily minimum °C (°F)	−6.1 (21.0)	−5.8 (21.6)	−1.6 (29.1)	2.2 (36.0)	6.0 (42.8)	9.1 (48.4)	11.4 (52.5)	11.6 (52.9)	7.0 (44.6)	3.4 (38.1)	−2.0 (28.4)	−3.9 (25.0)	2.7 (36.9)
Average precipitation mm (inches)	35.31 (1.39)	29.22 (1.15)	39.98 (1.57)	45.23 (1.78)	46.4 (1.83)	25.01 (0.98)	6.34 (0.25)	5.39 (0.21)	15.91 (0.63)	28.93 (1.14)	28.95 (1.14)	37.68 (1.48)	344.35 (13.56)
Average precipitation days (≥ 1.0 mm)	7.1	6.0	7.4	7.2	7.4	4.9	2.0	1.7	3.0	5.3	5.3	6.8	64.1
Average relative humidity (%)	78.2	75.2	69.0	65.3	65.5	61.8	55.7	55.3	56.6	65.1	71.3	78.0	66.4
Source: NOAA
