= Özükavak =

- Municipality
- Location in Turkey Özükavak (Turkey Central Anatolia)
- Coordinates: 40°01′22″N 35°42′10″E
- Country: Turkey
- Province: Yozgat
- District: Çekerek
- Population (2022): 1,149
- Time zone: UTC+3 (TRT)

Özükavak is a town (belde) in the Çekerek District, Yozgat Province, Turkey. Its population is 1,149 (2022).
