= Şefaatli =

- Municipality
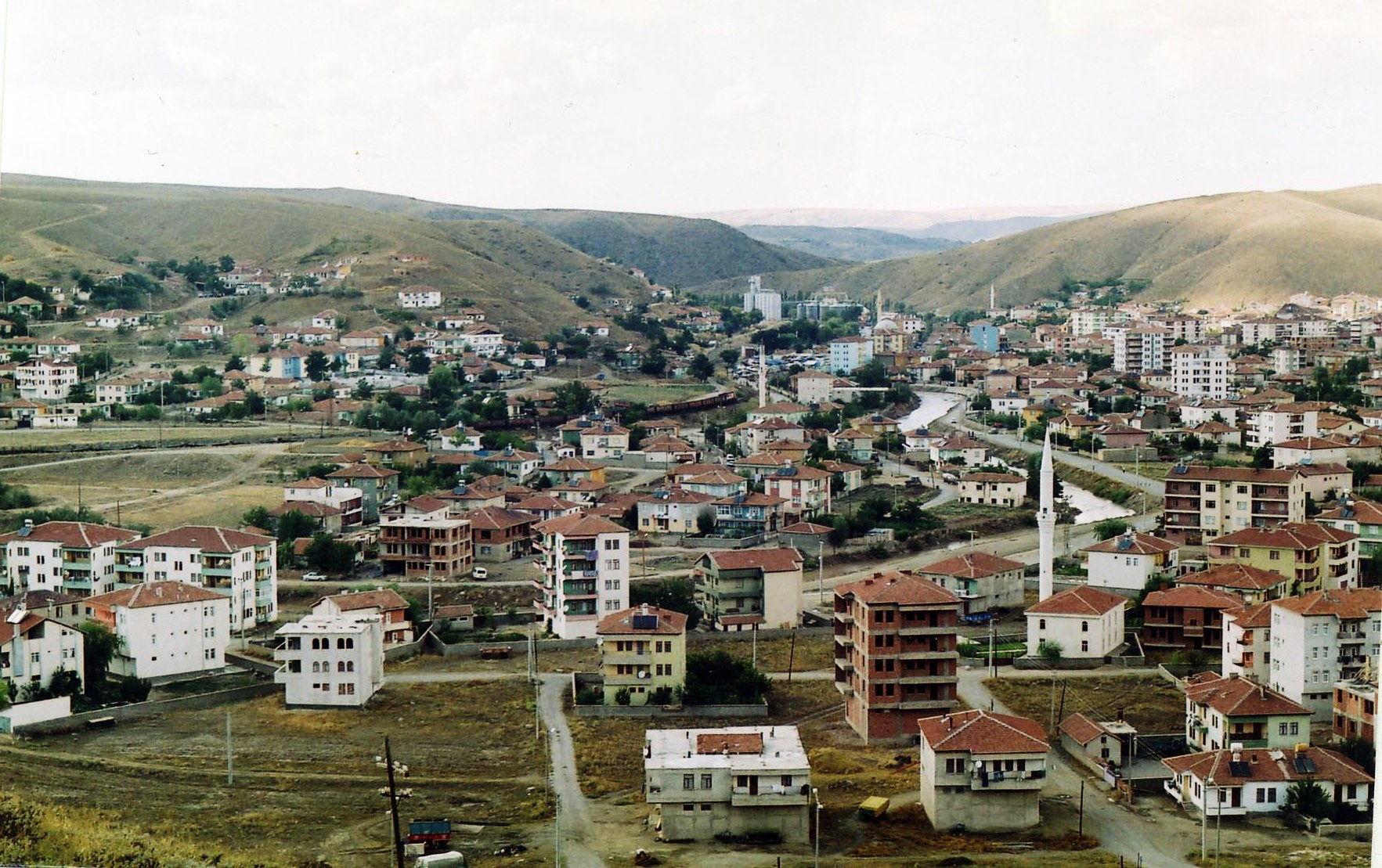
- General view of Şefaatli

- Location within Turkey Location within Turkey Central Anatolia
- Coordinates: 39°30′06″N 34°45′08″E
- Country: Turkey
- Province: Yozgat
- District: Şefaatli

Government
  - Mayor: Zeki Bozkurt (AKP)
- Elevation: 920 m (3,020 ft)
- Population (2022): 8,769
- Time zone: UTC+3 (TRT)
- Postal code: 66800
- Area code: 0354
- Website: www.sefaatli.bel.tr

Şefaatli is a town in Yozgat Province in the Central Anatolia region of Turkey. It is the seat of Şefaatli District. Its population is 8,769 (2022).

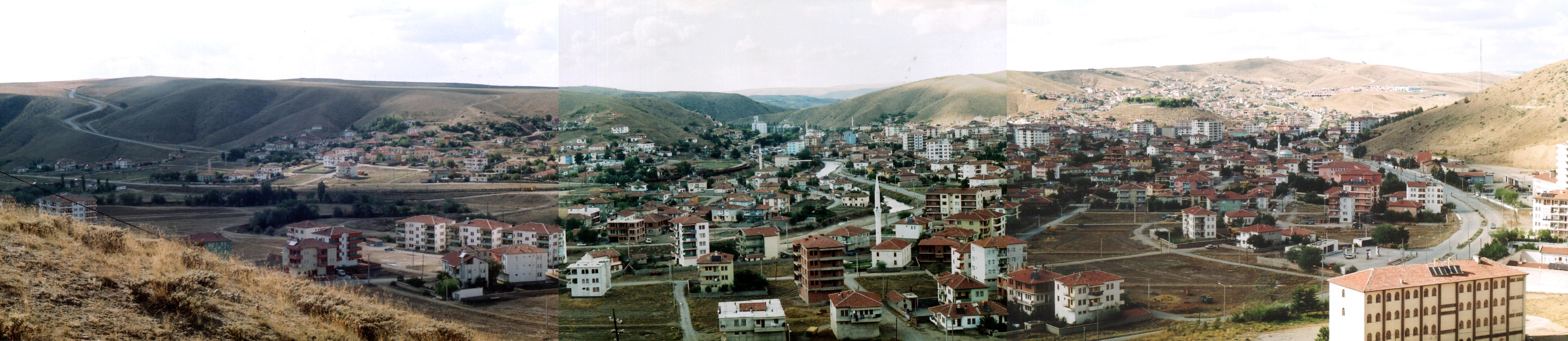
A panoramic view of Şefaatli
