= Gülşehri =

- Municipality
- Location in Turkey Gülşehri (Turkey Central Anatolia)
- Coordinates: 39°46′44″N 35°29′24″E
- Country: Turkey
- Province: Yozgat
- District: Sorgun
- Population (2022): 1,763
- Time zone: UTC+3 (TRT)

Gülşehri is a town (belde) in the Sorgun District, Yozgat Province, Turkey. Its population is 1,763 (2022).
