= Yenipazar, Boğazlıyan =

Yenipazar
- Municipality
- Location in Turkey Yenipazar (Turkey Central Anatolia)
- Coordinates: 39°27′53″N 35°04′57″E
- Country: Turkey
- Province: Yozgat
- District: Boğazlıyan
- Population (2022): 1,757
- Time zone: UTC+3 (TRT)

Yenipazar is a town (belde) in the Boğazlıyan District, Yozgat Province, Turkey. Its population was 1,757 in 2022.
