= Doğankent, Sorgun =

Doğankent
- Municipality
- Location in Turkey Doğankent (Turkey Central Anatolia)
- Coordinates: 39°40′52″N 35°25′37″E
- Country: Turkey
- Province: Yozgat
- District: Sorgun
- Population (2022): 2,443
- Time zone: UTC+3 (TRT)

Doğankent is a town (belde) in the Sorgun District, Yozgat Province, Turkey. Its population is 2,443 (2022).
