= Sırçalı, Boğazlıyan =

Sırçalı
- Municipality
- Location in Turkey Sırçalı (Turkey Central Anatolia)
- Coordinates: 39°19′48″N 35°08′31″E
- Country: Turkey
- Province: Yozgat
- District: Boğazlıyan
- Population (2022): 1,530
- Time zone: UTC+3 (TRT)

Sırçalı is a town (belde) in the Boğazlıyan District, Yozgat Province, Turkey. Its population is 1,530 (2022).
