= Uzunlu, Boğazlıyan =

Uzunlu
- Municipality
- Location in Turkey Uzunlu (Turkey Central Anatolia)
- Coordinates: 39°15′28″N 35°23′50″E
- Country: Turkey
- Province: Yozgat
- District: Boğazlıyan
- Population (2022): 1,283
- Time zone: UTC+3 (TRT)

Uzunlu is a town (belde) in the Boğazlıyan District, Yozgat Province, Turkey. Its population is 1,283 (2022).
