= Sorgun, Yozgat =

Sorgun
- Municipality
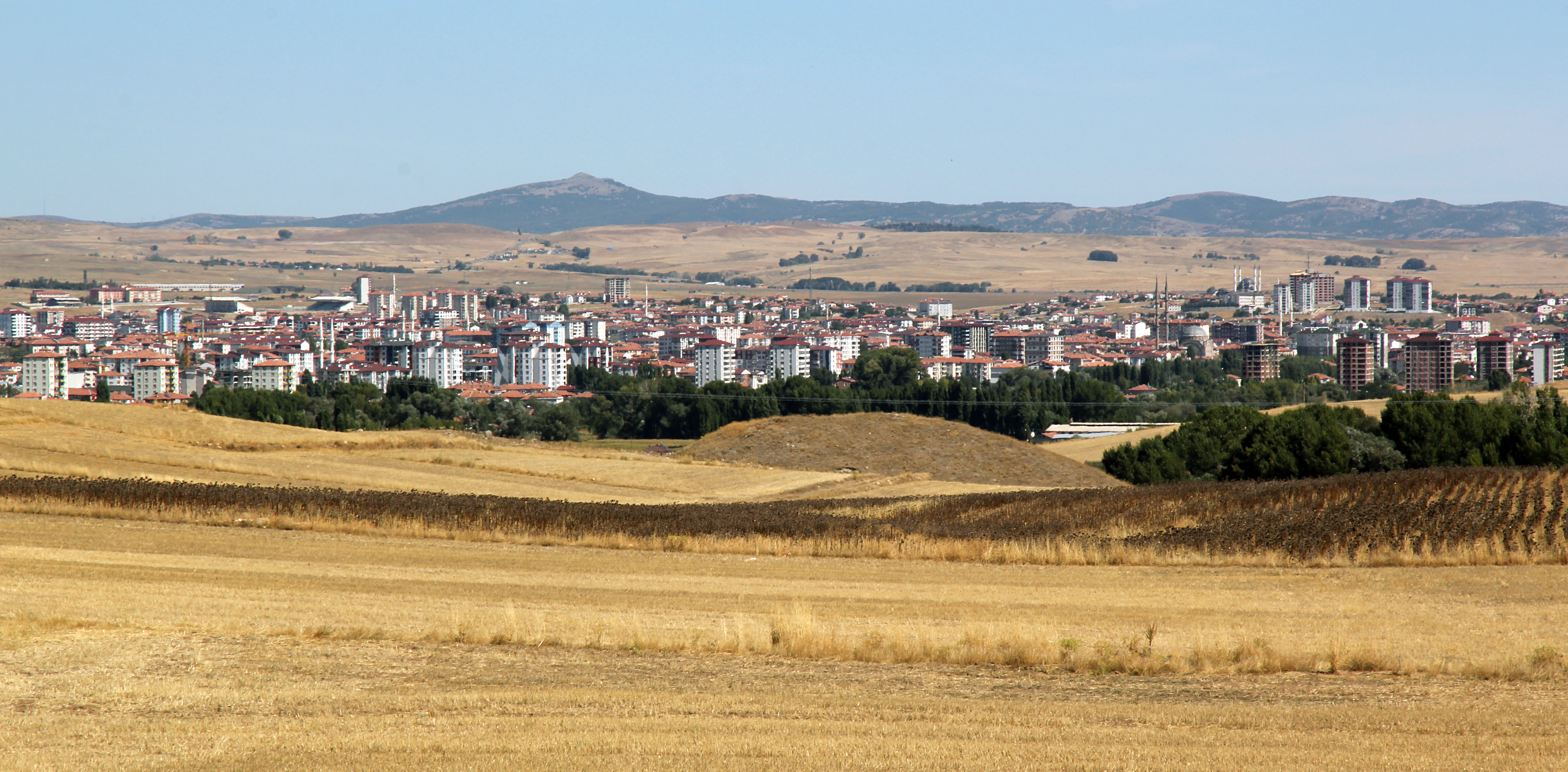
- View of Sorgun from the West

- Logo

- Location within Turkey Location within Turkey Central Anatolia
- Coordinates: 39°48′52″N 35°11′25″E
- Country: Turkey
- Province: Yozgat
- District: Sorgun

Government
  - Mayor: Mustafa Erkut Ekinci (MHP)
- Elevation: 1,074 m (3,524 ft)
- Population (2022): 55,079
- Time zone: UTC+3 (TRT)
- Postal code: 66540
- Area code: 0354
- Website: www.sorgun.bel.tr

Sorgun is a district in Yozgat Province in the Central Anatolia region of Turkey. It is the seat of Sorgun District. Its population is 55,079 (2022), making it the second-largest city in the province, after Yozgat. Its elevation is 1,074 m (3,524 ft).
