= Dedefakılı =

- Municipality
- Location in Turkey Dedefakılı (Turkey Central Anatolia)
- Coordinates: 39°42′56″N 35°26′05″E
- Country: Turkey
- Province: Yozgat
- District: Saraykent
- Population (2022): 1,158
- Time zone: UTC+3 (TRT)

Dedefakılı is a town (belde) in the Saraykent District, Yozgat Province, Turkey. Its population is 1,158 (2022).
