= Bahadın =

- Municipality
- Location in Turkey Bahadın (Turkey Central Anatolia)
- Coordinates: 39°40′30″N 35°18′14″E
- Country: Turkey
- Province: Yozgat
- District: Sorgun
- Population (2022): 2,370
- Time zone: UTC+3 (TRT)

Bahadın is a town (belde) in the Sorgun District, Yozgat Province, Turkey. Its population is 2,370 (2022).
