= Çiğdemli, Sorgun =

Çiğdemli
- Municipality
- Location in Turkey Çiğdemli (Turkey Central Anatolia)
- Coordinates: 39°49′26″N 35°18′15″E
- Country: Turkey
- Province: Yozgat
- District: Sorgun
- Population (2022): 1,767
- Time zone: UTC+3 (TRT)

Çiğdemli is a town (belde) in the Sorgun District, Yozgat Province, Turkey. Its population is 1,767 (2022).
