= Eymir, Sorgun =

Eymir
- Municipality
- Location in Turkey Eymir (Turkey Central Anatolia)
- Coordinates: 40°01′16″N 35°12′32″E
- Country: Turkey
- Province: Yozgat
- District: Sorgun
- Population (2022): 1,787
- Time zone: UTC+3 (TRT)

Eymir is a town (belde) in the Sorgun District, Yozgat Province, Turkey. Its population is 1,787 (2022).
