= Yamaçlı, Boğazlıyan =

Yamaçlı
- Municipality
- Location in Turkey Yamaçlı (Turkey Central Anatolia)
- Coordinates: 39°19′28″N 35°03′35″E
- Country: Turkey
- Province: Yozgat
- District: Boğazlıyan
- Population (2022): 2,604
- Time zone: UTC+3 (TRT)

Yamaçlı is a town (belde) in the Boğazlıyan District, Yozgat Province, Turkey. Its population is 2,604 (2022).
