= Ozan, Saraykent =

Ozan
- Municipality
- Location in Turkey Ozan (Turkey Central Anatolia)
- Coordinates: 39°39′17″N 35°33′59″E
- Country: Turkey
- Province: Yozgat
- District: Saraykent
- Population (2022): 1,404
- Time zone: UTC+3 (TRT)

Ozan is a town (belde) in the Saraykent District, Yozgat Province, Turkey. Its population is 1,404 (2022).
