= Karayakup, Sarıkaya =

Karayakup
- Municipality
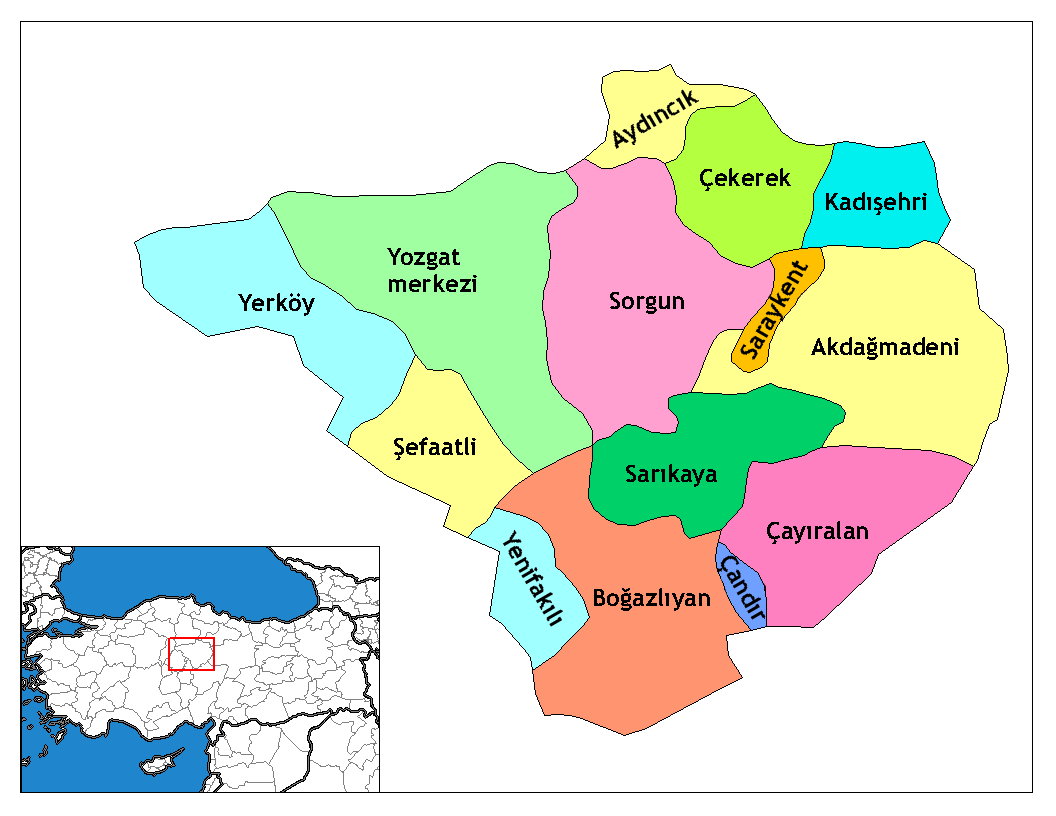
- Sarıkaya, Yozgat Province

- Location within Turkey Location within Turkey Central Anatolia
- Coordinates: 39°33′34″N 35°23′14″E
- Country: Turkey
- Province: Yozgat
- District: Sarıkaya
- Population (2022): 3,017
- Time zone: UTC+3 (TRT)

Karayakup is a town (belde) in the Sarıkaya District, Yozgat Province, Turkey. Its population is 3,017 (2022).
