= Çekerek =

- Municipality
- Coat of arms

- Location in Turkey Çekerek (Turkey Central Anatolia)
- Coordinates: 40°04′23″N 35°29′41″E
- Country: Turkey
- Province: Yozgat
- District: Çekerek

Government
  - Mayor: Üzeyir Ince (MHP)
- Elevation: 925 m (3,035 ft)
- Population (2022): 9,471
- Time zone: UTC+3 (TRT)
- Postal code: 66500
- Area code: 0354
- Website: www.cekerek.bel.tr

Çekerek is a town in Yozgat Province in the Central Anatolia region of Turkey. It is the seat of Çekerek District. Its population is 9,471 (2022). It is located in northeast of Yozgat province and it is 90 km (56 miles) from Yozgat city.

== Lavender Island ==
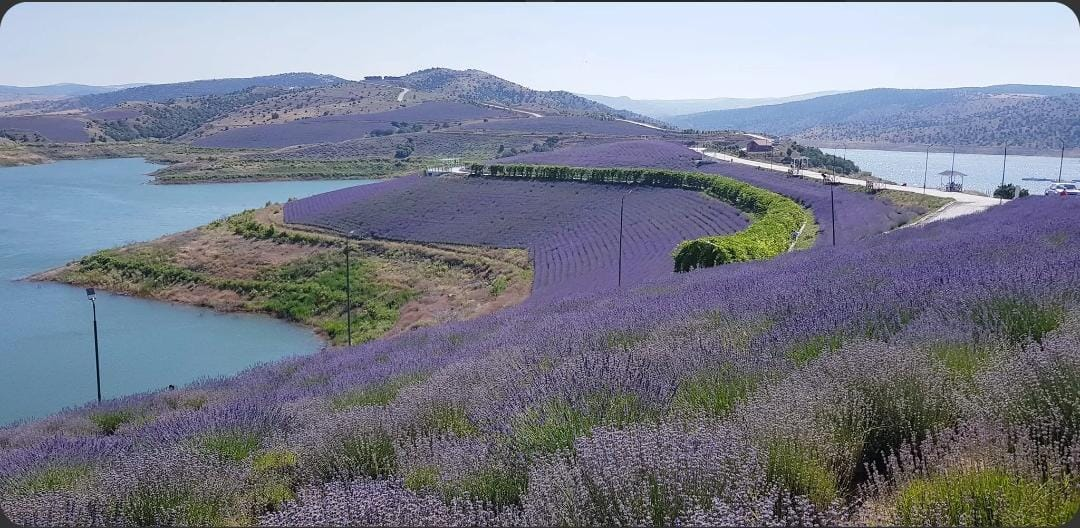
Çekerek Lavender Island

Çekerek Lavender Island was created after the construction of the Çekerek Dam, which formed several small islands and peninsulas within the dam. The Ministry of Forestry carried out landscaping work on one of these peninsulas. Numerous lavender seedlings were planted in this area, transforming the entire peninsula into a lavender landscape.
