= Kadışehri =

- Municipality
- Location in Turkey Kadışehri (Turkey Central Anatolia)
- Coordinates: 40°00′N 35°49′E
- Country: Turkey
- Province: Yozgat
- District: Kadışehri

Government
  - Mayor: Davut Karadavut (YRP)
- Elevation: 1,020 m (3,350 ft)
- Population (2022): 4,527
- Time zone: UTC+3 (TRT)
- Postal code: 66540
- Area code: 0354
- Website: www.kadisehri.bel.tr

Kadışehri is a town in Yozgat Province in the Central Anatolia region of Turkey. It is the seat of Kadışehri District. Its population is 4,527 (2022). Its elevation is 1,020 m (3,350 ft).
