= Yenifakılı =

- Municipality
- Location in Turkey Yenifakılı (Turkey Central Anatolia)
- Coordinates: 39°12′N 35°00′E
- Country: Turkey
- Province: Yozgat
- District: Yenifakılı

Government
  - Mayor: Musa Sariaslan (MHP)
- Elevation: 1,020 m (3,350 ft)
- Population (2022): 2,619
- Time zone: UTC+3 (TRT)
- Postal code: 66470
- Area code: 0354
- Website: www.yenifakili.bel.tr

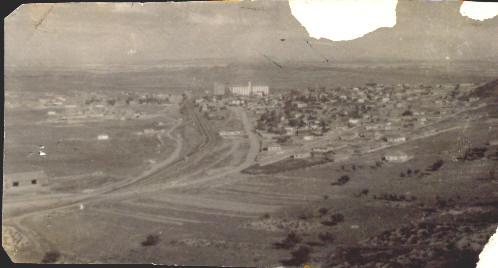

Yenifakılı is a town in Yozgat Province in the Central Anatolia region of Turkey. It is the seat of Yenifakılı District. Its population is 2,619 (2022). Its elevation is 1,020 m (3,350 ft).
