= Akdağmadeni =

- Municipality
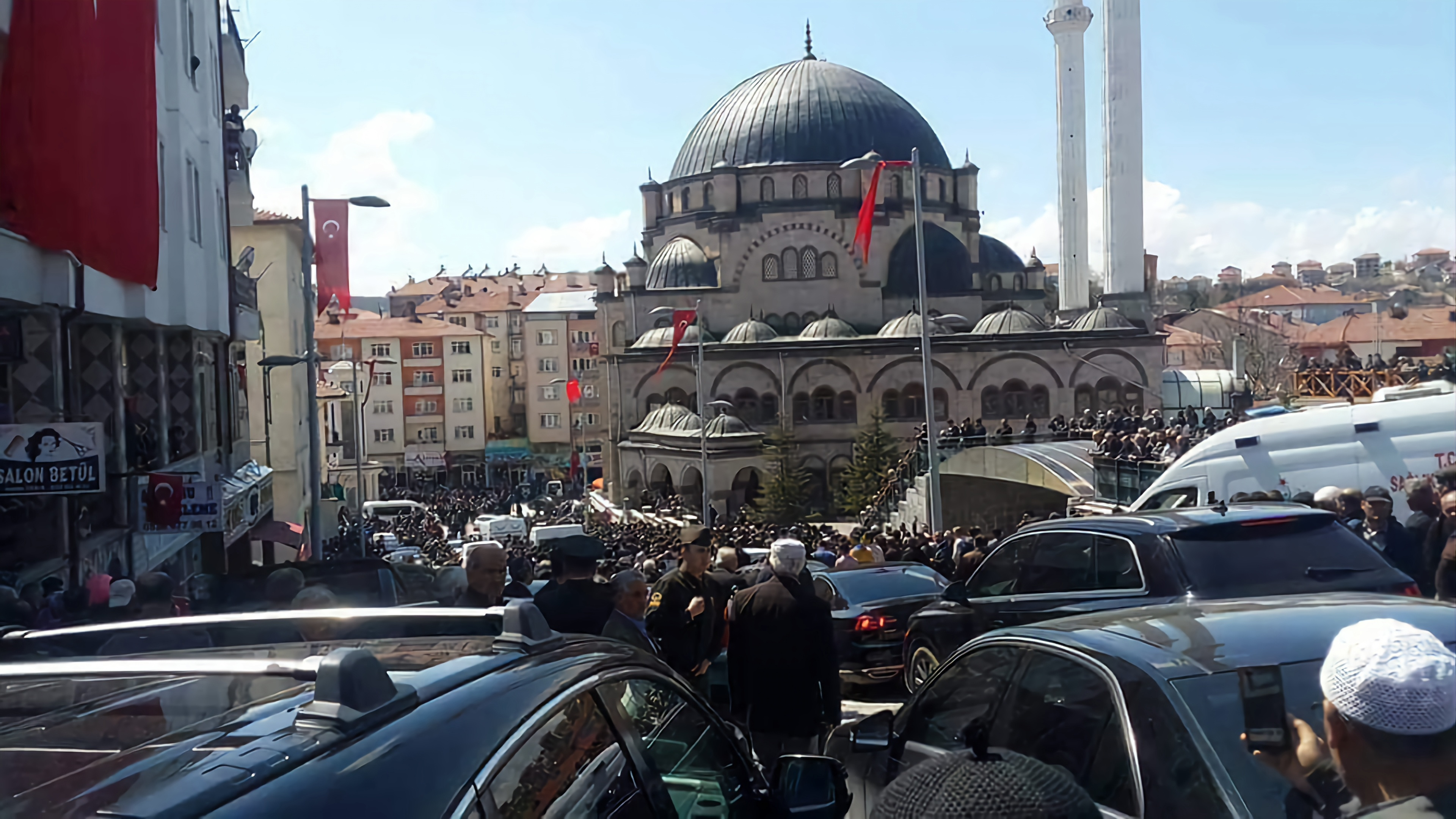
- Akdağmadeni city center

- Logo

- Location within Turkey Location within Turkey Central Anatolia
- Coordinates: 39°39′57″N 35°53′01″E
- Country: Turkey
- Province: Yozgat
- District: Akdağmadeni

Government
  - Mayor: Nezih Yalçın (MHP)
- Elevation: 1,344 m (4,409 ft)
- Population (2022): 22,180
- Time zone: UTC+3 (TRT)
- Postal code: 66540
- Area code: 0354
- Website: www.akdagmadeni.bel.tr

Akdağmadeni (Greek: Ἀργυρίων, Argyríōn) is a town in the Yozgat Province in the Central Anatolia region of Turkey. It is the seat of Akdağmadeni District. Its population is 22,180 (2022). Its elevation is 1,344 m (4,409 ft).

According to the Ottoman population statistics of 1914, the kaza of Akdağmadeni had a total population of 48,759, consisting of 37,081 Muslims, 7,892 Greeks, 3,312 Armenians, 49 Protestants and 425 Roma.

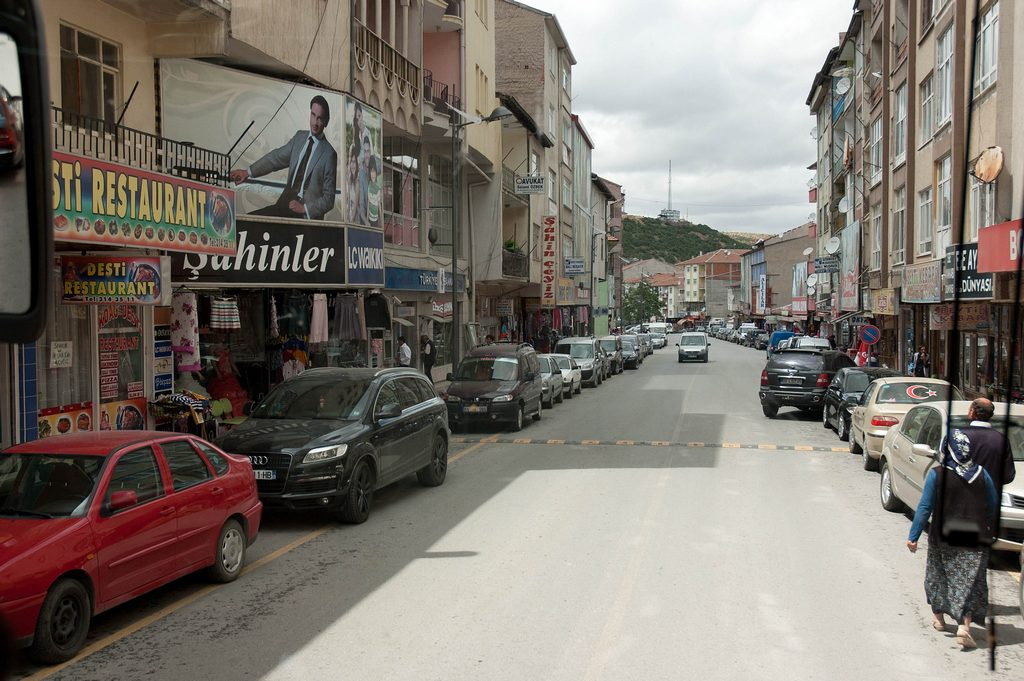
Akdagmadeni market street

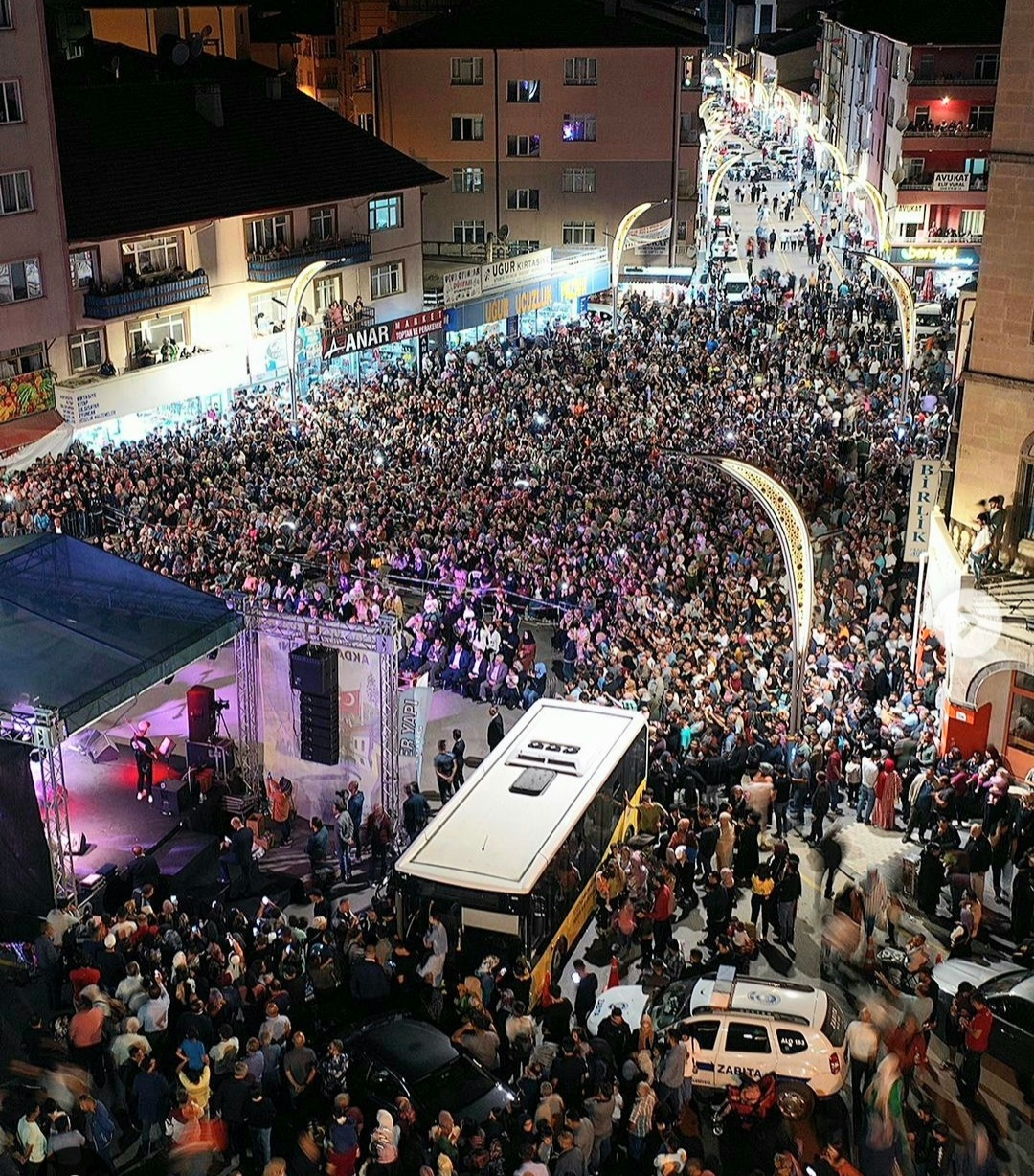
A crowd gathering in Akdağmadeni

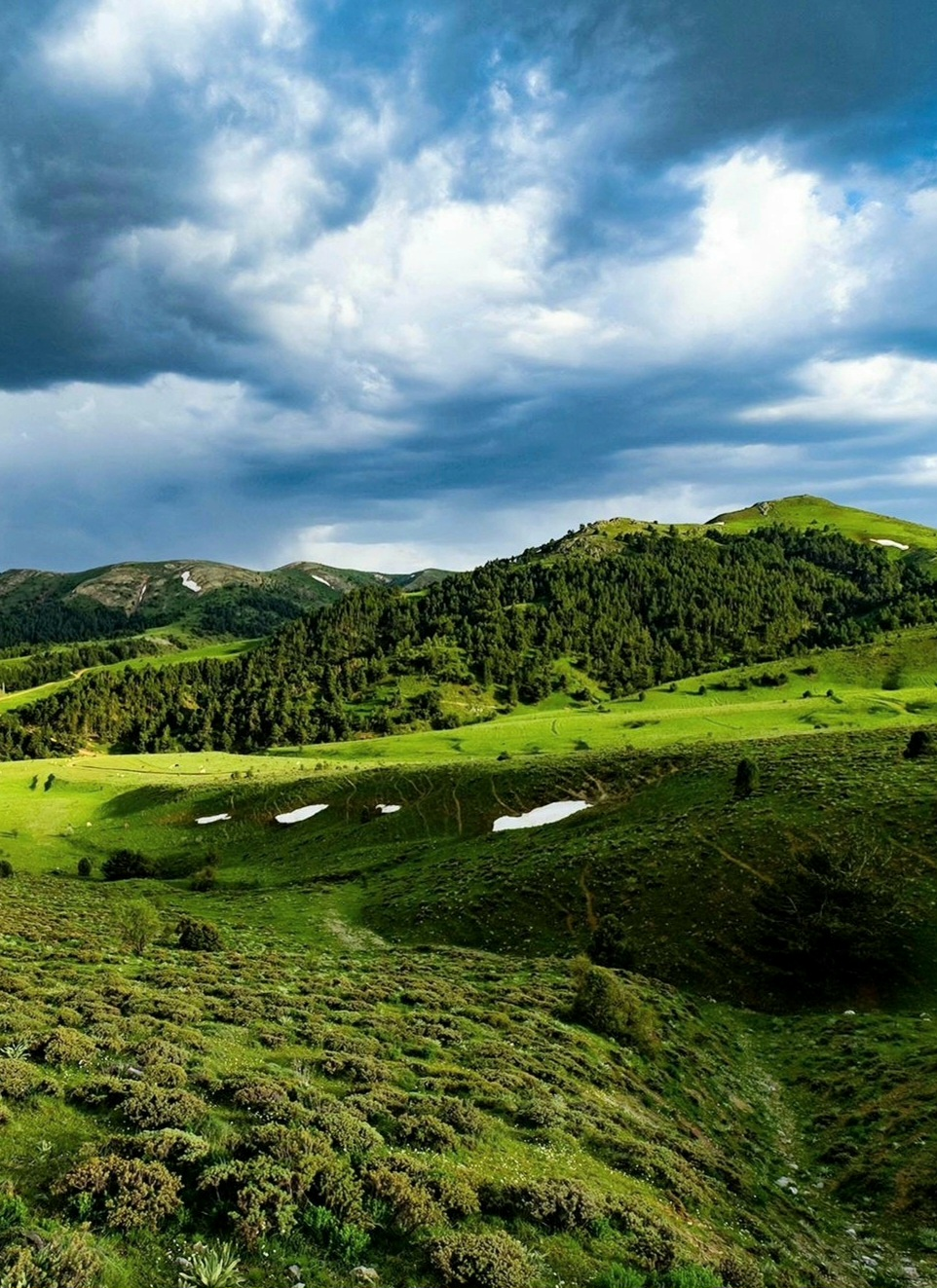
The landscape in Akdağmadeni
