= Sarıkaya, Yozgat =

Sarıkaya
- Municipality
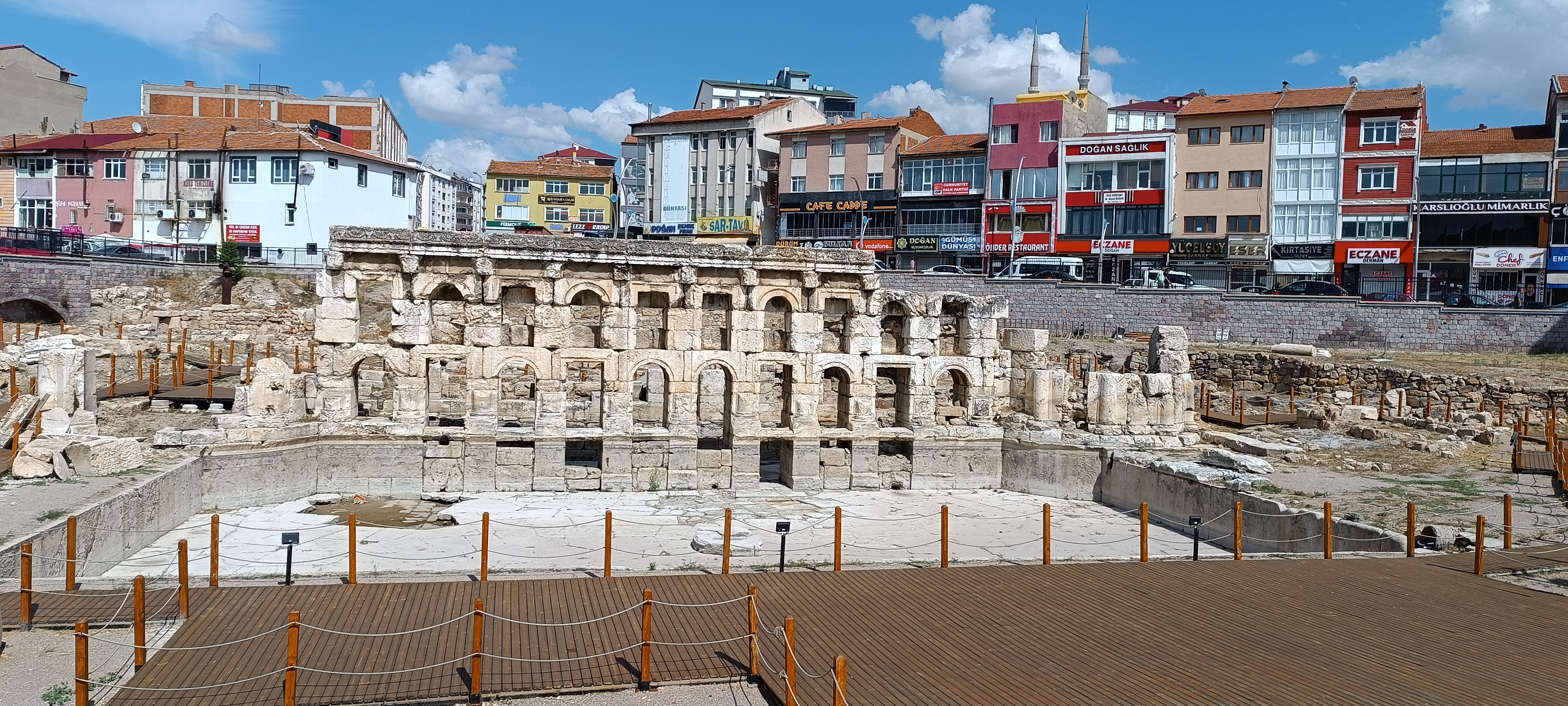
- Sarıkaya Roman Basilica Therma in the city center

- Coat of arms

- Location within Turkey Location within Turkey Central Anatolia
- Coordinates: 39°29′37″N 35°22′37″E
- Country: Turkey
- Province: Yozgat
- District: Sarıkaya

Government
  - Mayor: Osman Gözan (AKP)
- Elevation: 1,169 m (3,835 ft)
- Population (2022): 18,457
- Time zone: UTC+3 (TRT)
- Postal code: 66650
- Area code: 0354
- Website: www.sarikaya.bel.tr

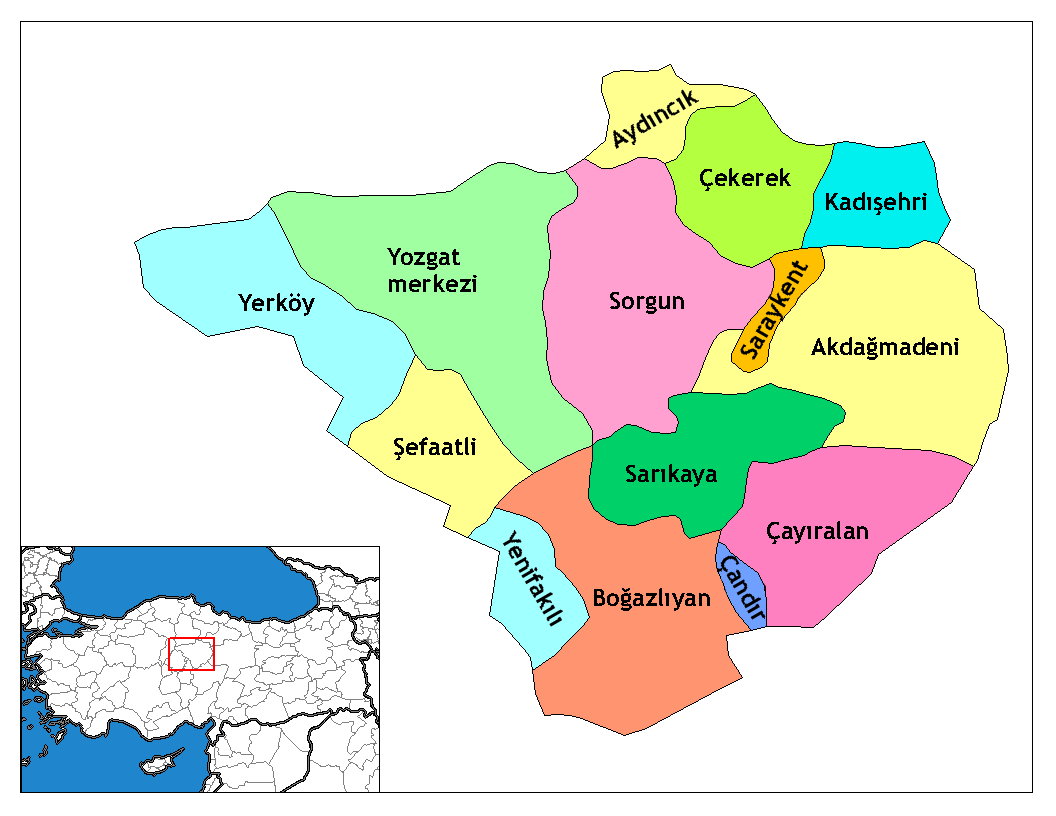
Districts of Yozgat province

Sarıkaya is a town in Yozgat Province in the Central Anatolia region of Turkey and the seat of Sarıkaya District. It as a population of 18,457 as of 2022.

Sarıkaya's Ottoman-era name was Terzili and is known locally as Terzilihamam due to its hamams (bathhouses). The town is currently known for its UNESCO submitted Roman-era bath named Basilica Therma that is preserved and easily visible in the town center.
