= Saraykent =

- Municipality
- Location in Turkey Saraykent (Turkey Central Anatolia)
- Coordinates: 39°41′37″N 35°30′40″E
- Country: Turkey
- Province: Yozgat
- District: Saraykent

Government
  - Mayor: Ahmet Köroğlu (MHP)
- Elevation: 1,149 m (3,770 ft)
- Population (2022): 5,687
- Time zone: UTC+3 (TRT)
- Postal code: 66320
- Area code: 0354
- Website: www.saraykent.bel.tr

Saraykent is a town in Yozgat Province in the Central Anatolia region of Turkey. The former name of the town is Karamağara. It is the seat of Saraykent District. Its population is 5,687 (2022). Its elevation is 1,149 m (3,770 ft).
