= Çayıralan =

- Municipality
- Location within Turkey Location within Turkey Central Anatolia
- Coordinates: 39°18′18″N 35°38′40″E
- Country: Turkey
- Province: Yozgat
- District: Çayıralan

Government
  - Mayor: Ahmet Kaygisiz (MHP)
- Elevation: 1,348 m (4,423 ft)
- Population (2022): 4,925
- Time zone: UTC+3 (TRT)
- Postal code: 66600
- Area code: 0354
- Website: www.cayiralan.bel.tr

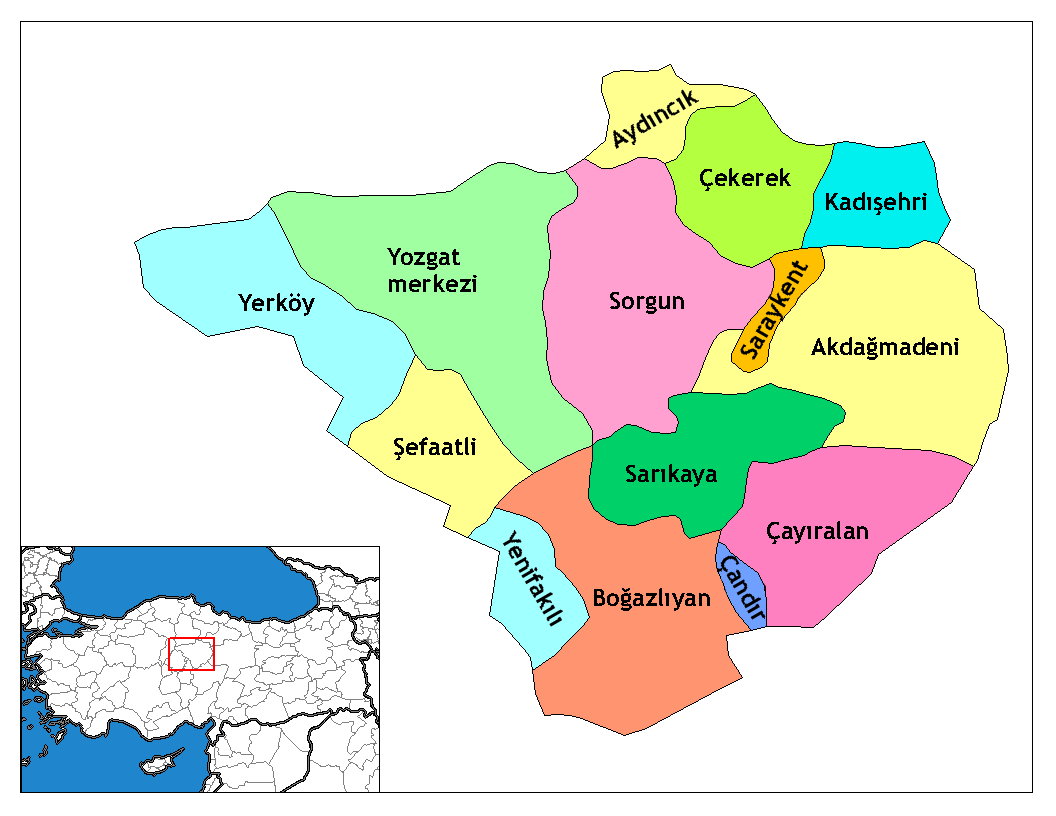
Map of the districts of Yozgat province in Turkey.

Çayıralan is a town in Yozgat Province in the Central Anatolia region of Turkey. It is the seat of Çayıralan District. Its population is 4,925 (2022). Its elevation is 1,348 m (4,423 ft).
