= Yozgat Province =

Province of Turkey

Coordinates: 39°40′10″N 35°16′09″E

Yozgat Province Yozgat ili
- Province
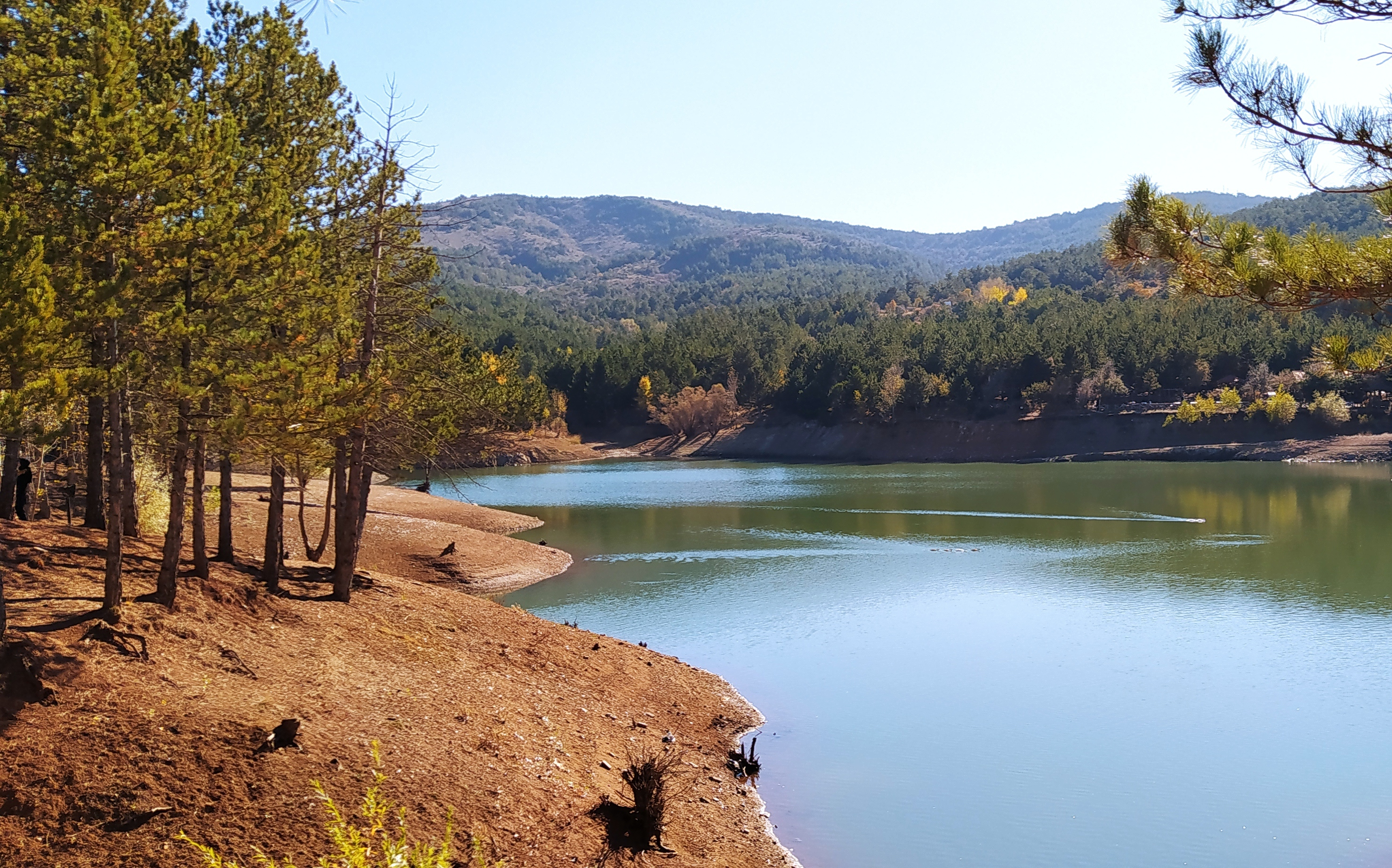
- Yozgat Fatih Nature Park (Çamlık Milli Parkı)

- Location of the province within Turkey
- Country: Turkey
- Seat: Yozgat

Government
  - Governor: Mehmet Ali Özkan
- Area: 13,690 km^{2} (5,290 sq mi)
- Population (2022): 418,442
  - Density: 30.57/km^{2} (79.16/sq mi)
- Time zone: UTC+3 (TRT)
- Area code: 0354
- Website: www.yozgat.gov.tr

Yozgat Province (Turkish: Yozgat ili) is a province in central Turkey. Its area is 13,690 km^{2}, and its population is 418,442 (2022). Its adjacent provinces are Çorum to the northwest, Kırıkkale to the west, Kırşehir to the southwest, Nevşehir to the south, Kayseri to the southeast, Sivas to the east, Tokat to the northeast, and Amasya to the north. The provincial capital is Yozgat.

== Toponymy ==
It was previously called Bozok and renamed Yozgat in 1927.

== Districts ==
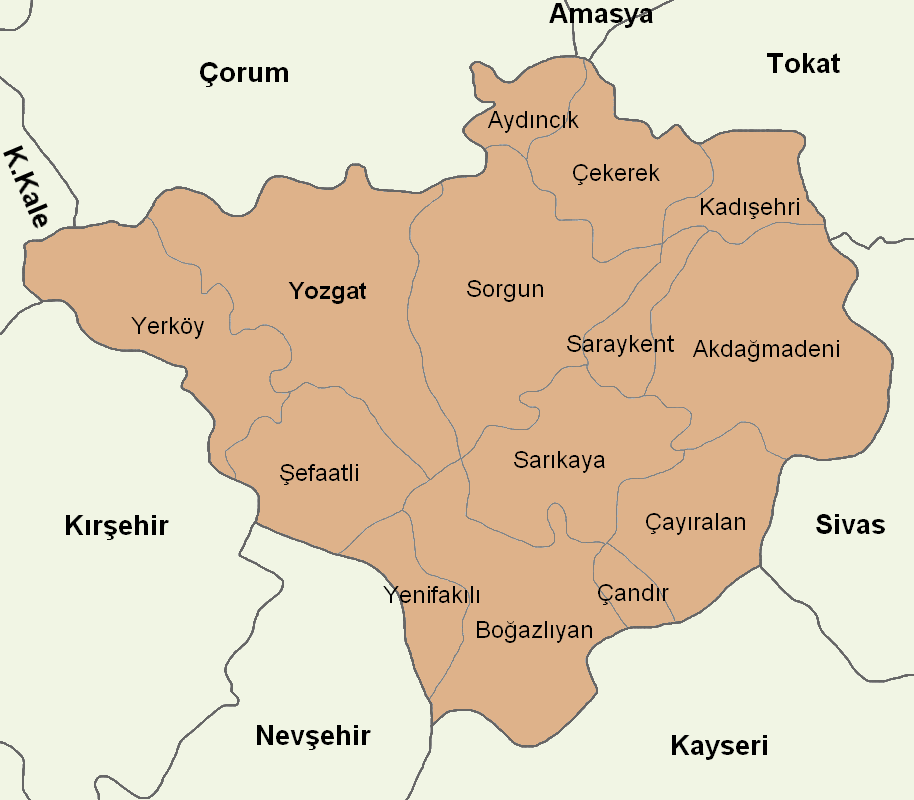

Yozgat province is divided into 14 districts (capital district in bold):

- Akdağmadeni
- Aydıncık
- Boğazlıyan
- Çandır
- Çayıralan
- Çekerek
- Kadışehri
- Saraykent
- Sarıkaya
- Şefaatli
- Sorgun
- Yenifakılı
- Yerköy
- **Yozgat**

== Places of interest ==
- Yozgat Pine Grove National Park
- Yozgat Castle (Historical Behramşah Castle and Tombs)
- Roma Kral Kızı Hamamı
- Yozgat Fatih Tabiat Parkı
- Büyük Camii (Çapanoğlu Mosque)

== Mosques ==
- Fatih Camii, a former church in the city centre

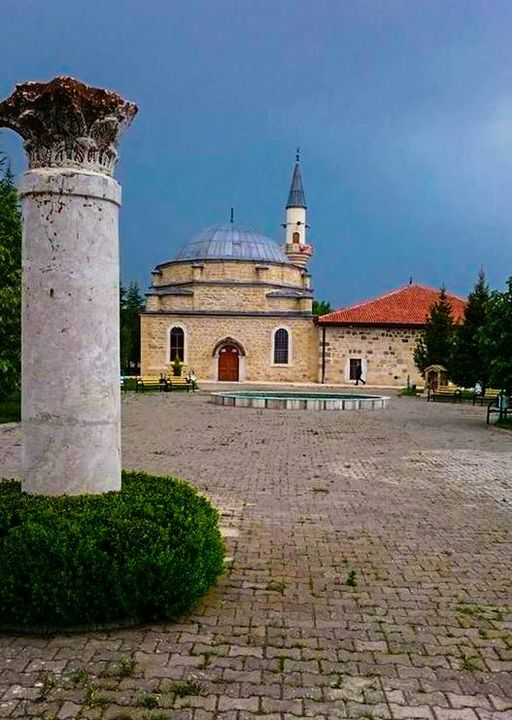
Columns surrounding the Emirci Sultan Mosque in Osmanpaşa, Yozgat

== See also ==
- List of populated places in Yozgat Province
