= Divanlı =

Divanlı may refer to the following villages:

- Divanlı, Barda - A village in the Barda Rayon of Azerbaijan.
- Divanlı, Yozgat - A village in the Yozgat Province of Turkey.
