= Yerköy YHT railway station =

YERKÖY YHT

General information
- Location: Akpınar Köyü, 66900; Yerköy/Yozgat; Turkey
- Coordinates: 39.6874°N 34.4638°E
- System: TCDD high-speed rail station
- Owner: Turkish State Railways
- Line: Yüksek Hızlı Tren
- Platforms: 2 side platforms
- Tracks: 4

History
- Opened: 2023 (Expected)

Services
Preceding station	TCDD Taşımacılık	Following station
Kırıkkale YHT towards Ankara	Yüksek Hızlı Tren	Yozgat towards Sivas
Location

Yerköy YHT railway station, short for Yerköy Yüksek Hızlı Tren station (Turkish: Yerköy Yüksek Hızlı Tren garı), is a railway station located north of Yerköy, Turkey, that is under construction. The station is located just north of the D.200 highway near the village of Akpınar, and will service high-speed trains along the Ankara-Sivas high-speed railway.

Yerköy YHT station is one of two stations servicing Yerköy, together with Yerköy station, which is serviced by conventional trains. The YHT stands for HSR or High-speed railway.
