= Sorgun YHT railway station =

Railway station in Yozgat, Turkey

SORGUN YHT

General information
- Location: Ziya Gökalp Cd., 66000 Sorgun/Yozgat; Turkey
- Coordinates: 39.8268°N 35.1595°E
- System: TCDD high-speed rail station
- Owner: Turkish State Railways
- Line: Yüksek Hızlı Tren
- Platforms: 2 side platforms
- Tracks: 4

History
- Opened: 13 March 2024

Services
| Preceding station | TCDD Taşımacılık | Following station |
Future service
| Yozgat towards Ankara | Yüksek Hızlı Tren | Akdağmadeni YHT towards Sivas |
Location

Sorgun YHT railway station, short for Sorgun Yüksek Hızlı Tren station (Turkish: Sorgun Yüksek Hızlı Tren garı), is a railway station located just northwest of Sorgun, Turkey. The station is situated on Ziya Gökalp Avenue and is about 3 km (1.9 mi) northwest of the town center and 30 km (19 mi) east of Yozgat.

The station will service high-speed trains along the Ankara-Sivas high-speed railway and is expected to open towards the end of 2018. The station will be the first railway link in the region.
