= Corniaspa =

Town of ancient Pontus

Coordinates: 39°52′11″N 34°46′03″E

- Location within Turkey
- Type: Settlement
- Periods: Iron Age, Roman Republican to High Medieval
- Location: Yozgat District, Kızıltepe Village, Yozgat Yozgat Province, Turkey
- Part of: Frontiers of Galatia, Pontus, Cappadocia

Corniaspa was a town of ancient Pontus, near the frontiers of Galatia, inhabited during Roman and Byzantine times. Eunomius of Cyzicus may have been born at Corniaspa.

Its site is located east of Yozgat, Asiatic Turkey.
