= Divanlı, Yozgat =

Divanlı
- Neighbourhood
- Location within Turkey Location within Turkey Central Anatolia
- Coordinates: 39.7525°N 34.8409°E
- Country: Turkey
- Province: Yozgat
- District: Yozgat
- Municipality: Yozgat
- Elevation: 1,240 m (4,070 ft)
- Population (2022): 453
- Time zone: UTC+3 (TRT)

Divanlı is a neighbourhood of the city Yozgat, Yozgat Province, Turkey. Its population is 453 (2022). It is situated about 7.6 km (4.7 mi) south of Yozgat, the provincial capital.

The village became the center of attention in Yozgat in 2008 when Divanlı was selected to become the site of the Yozgat YHT railway station, which would service high-speed trains along the Ankara-Sivas high-speed railway. The station was eventually opened on 26 April 2023.

An unnamed road connects Divanlı to the İL 66-25, which connects to the D.200 highway.

== Population ==
Historical population
Year	Pop.	±% p.a.
1985	1,123	—
1990	1,142	+0.34%
1997	893	−3.45%
2007	654	−3.07%
2012	602	−1.64%
2017	494	−3.88%
2022	453	−1.72%
Source: 1985 census, 1990 census, 1997 census and TÜIK (2007-2022)
