= Osh =

City in southern Kyrgyzstan

Osh Ош
- Independent City
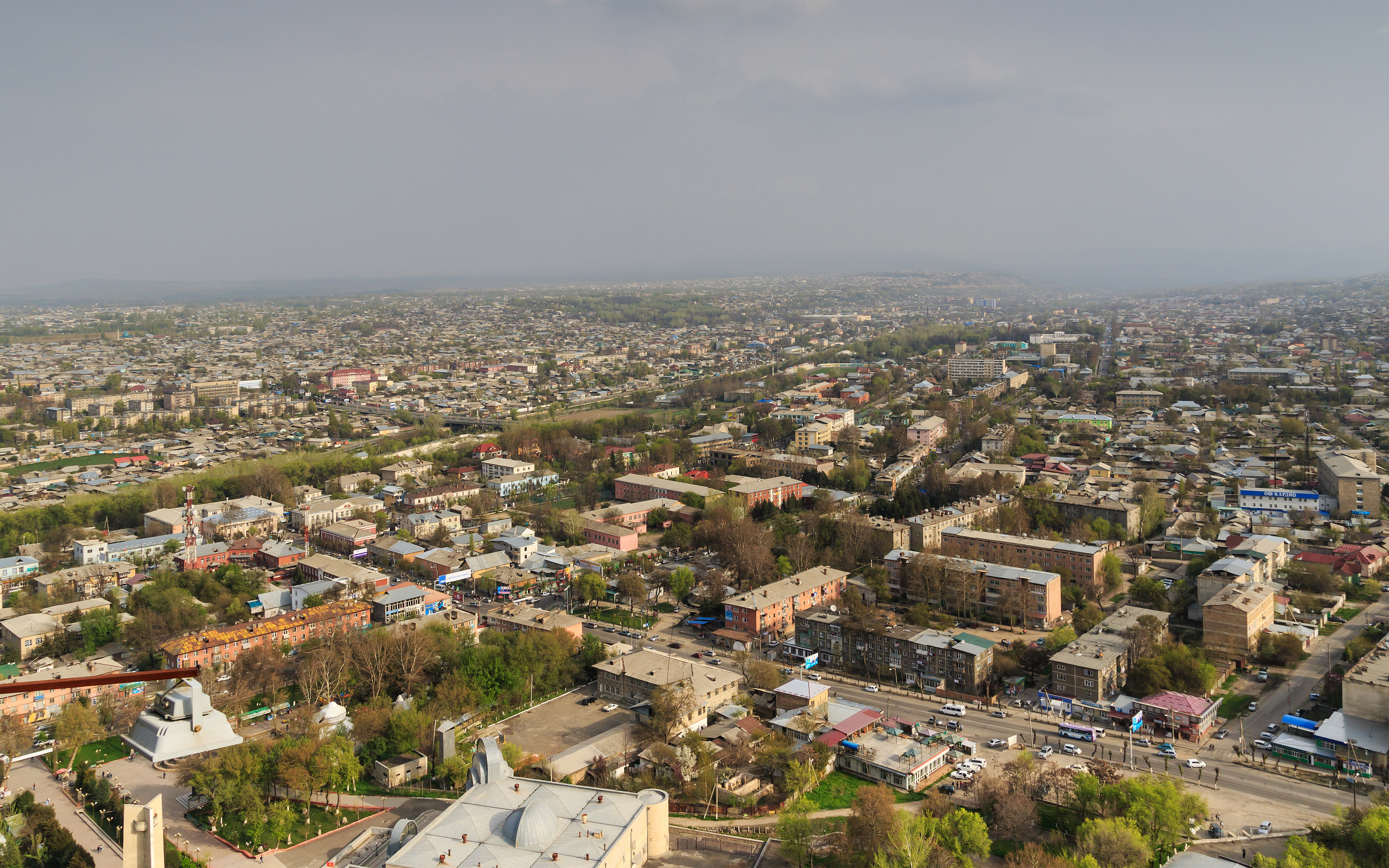
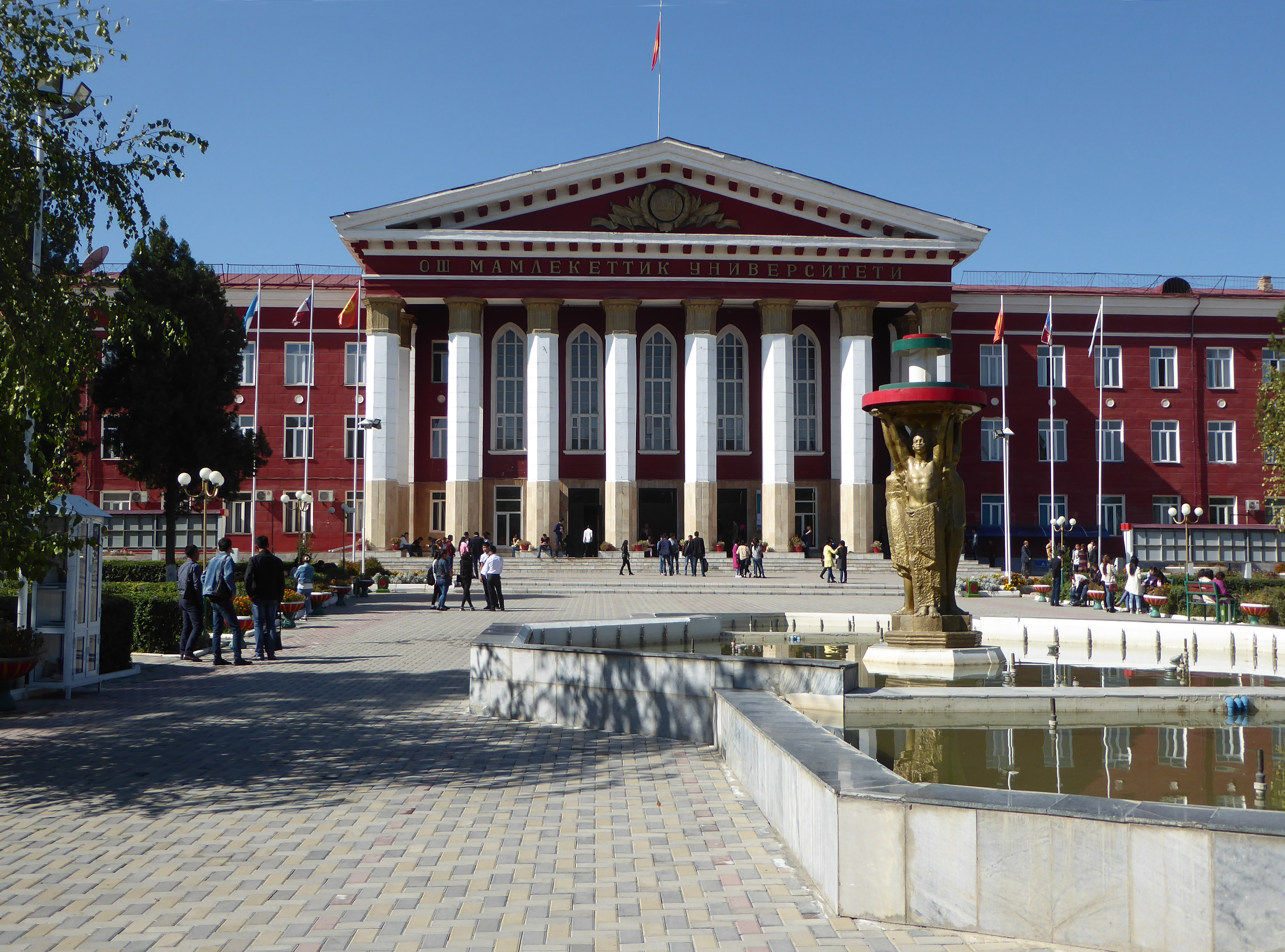
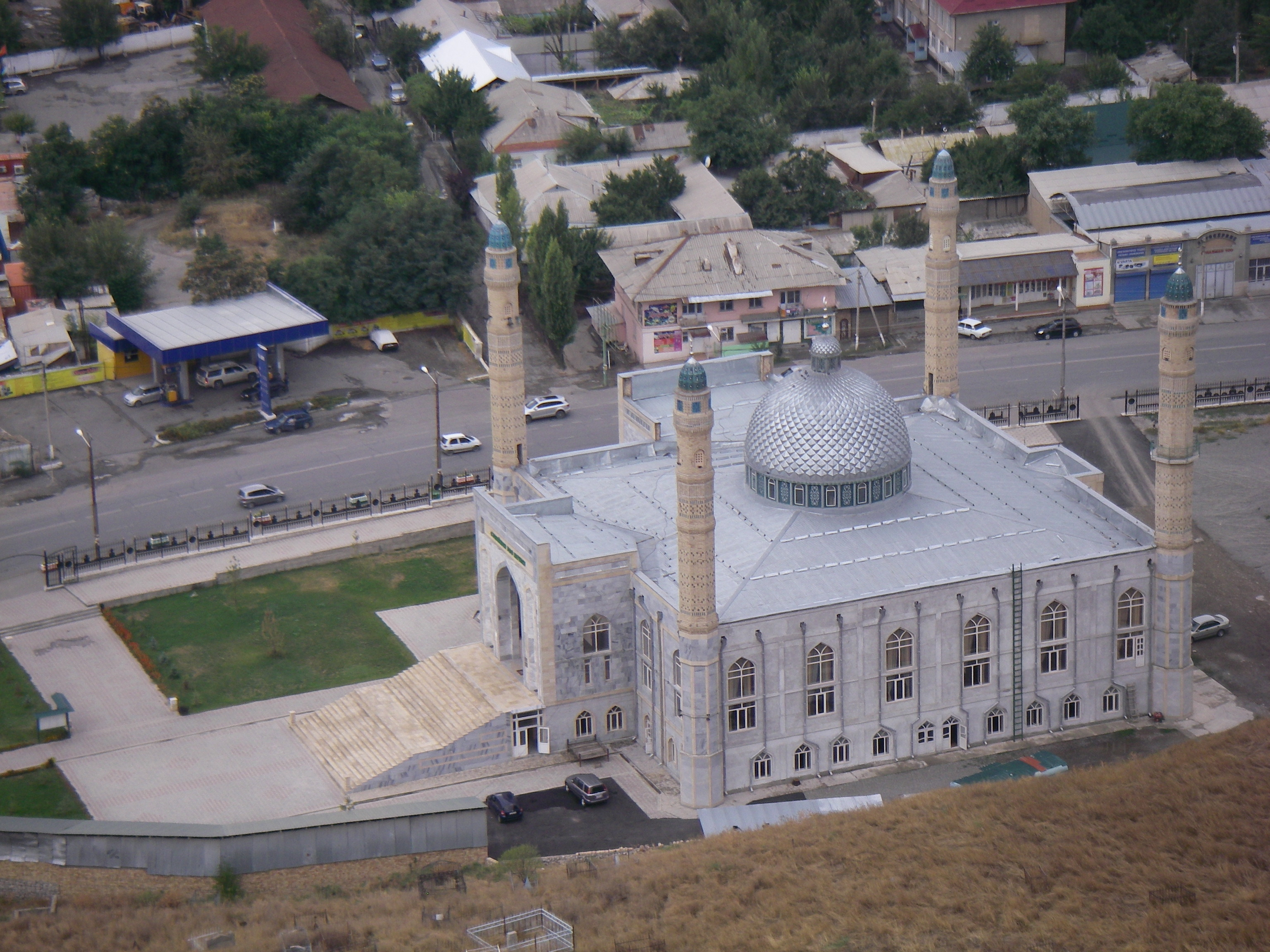
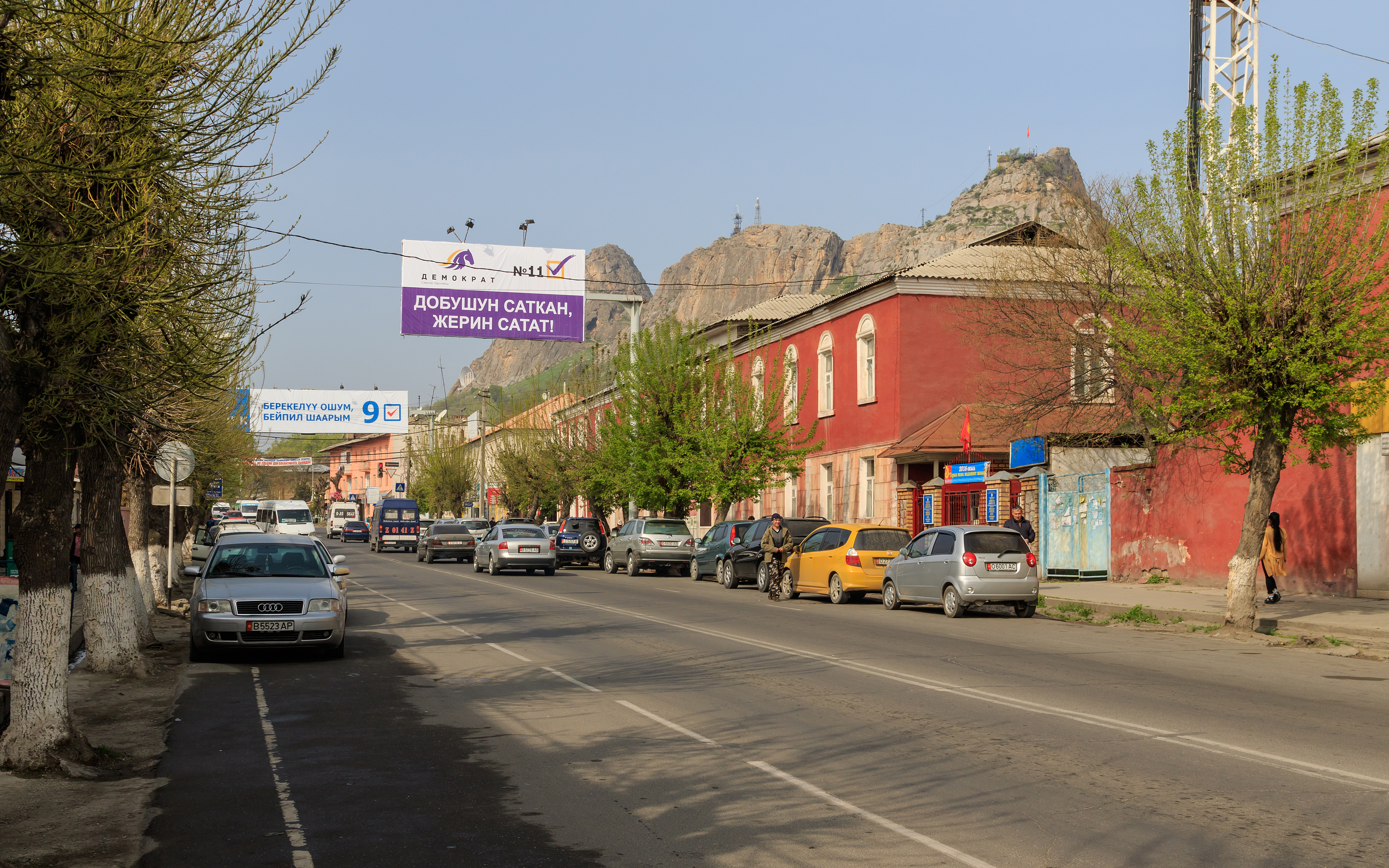
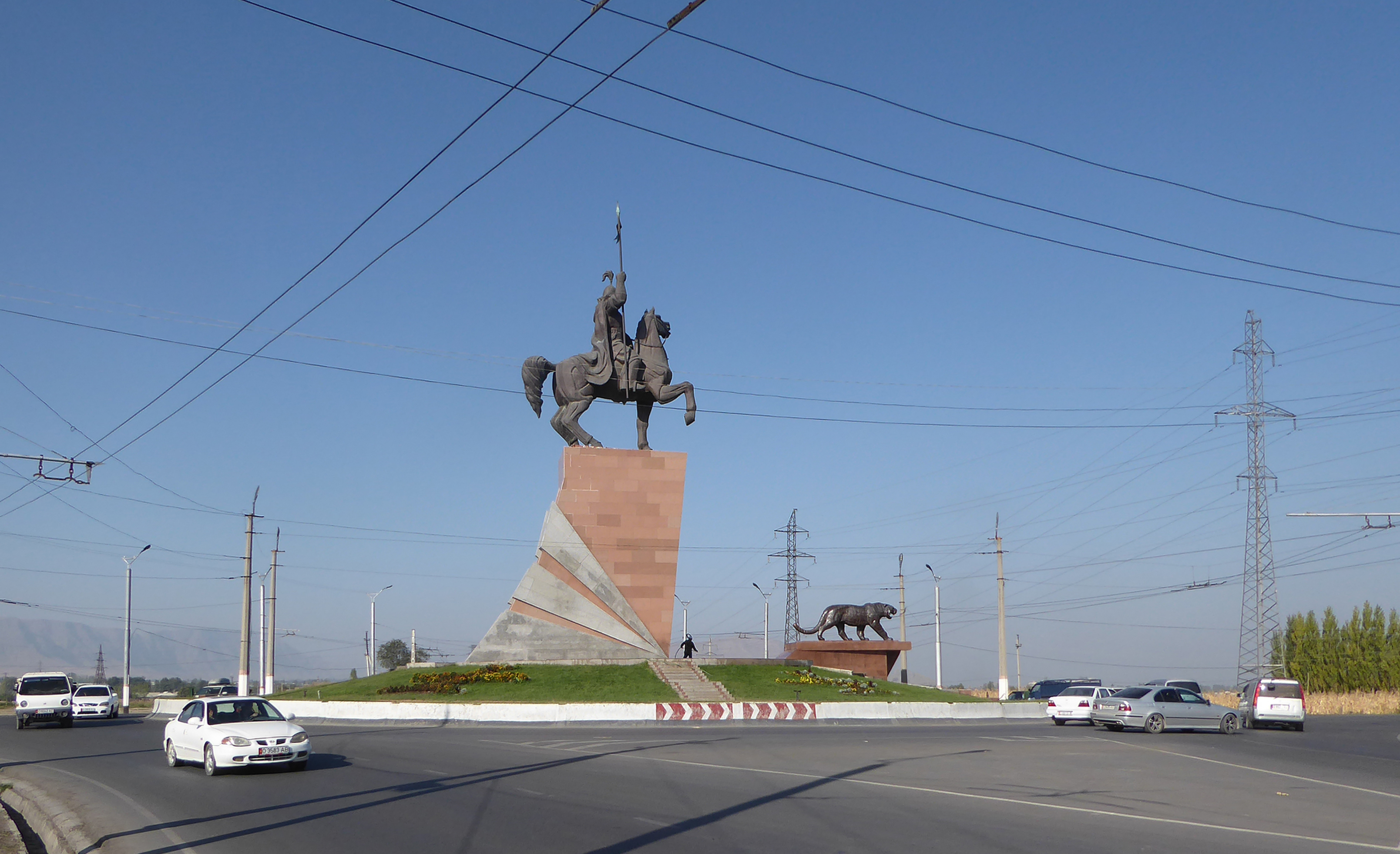
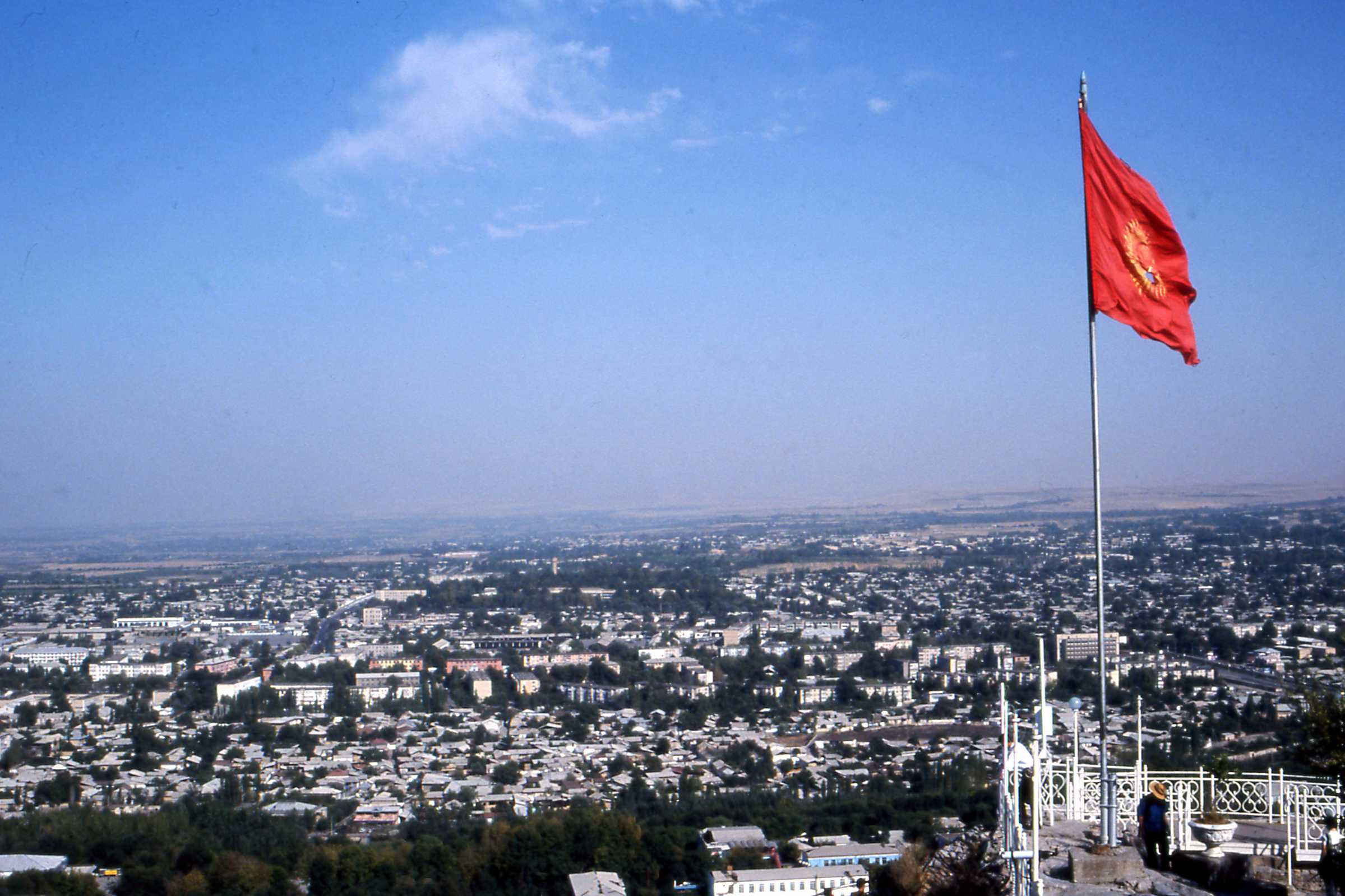
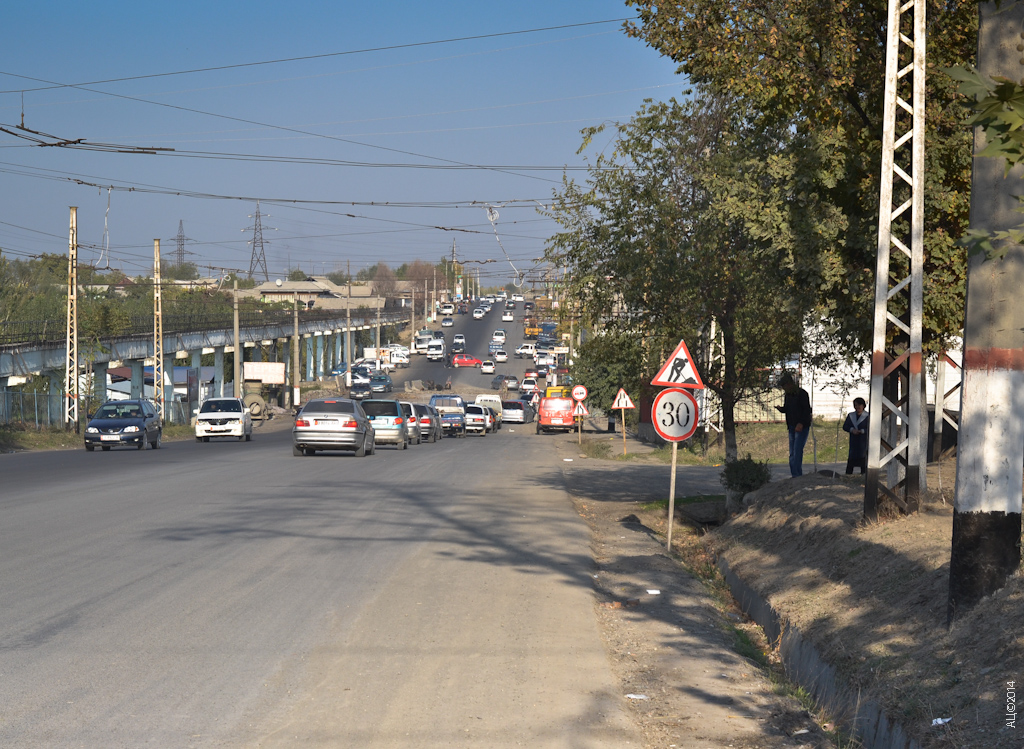
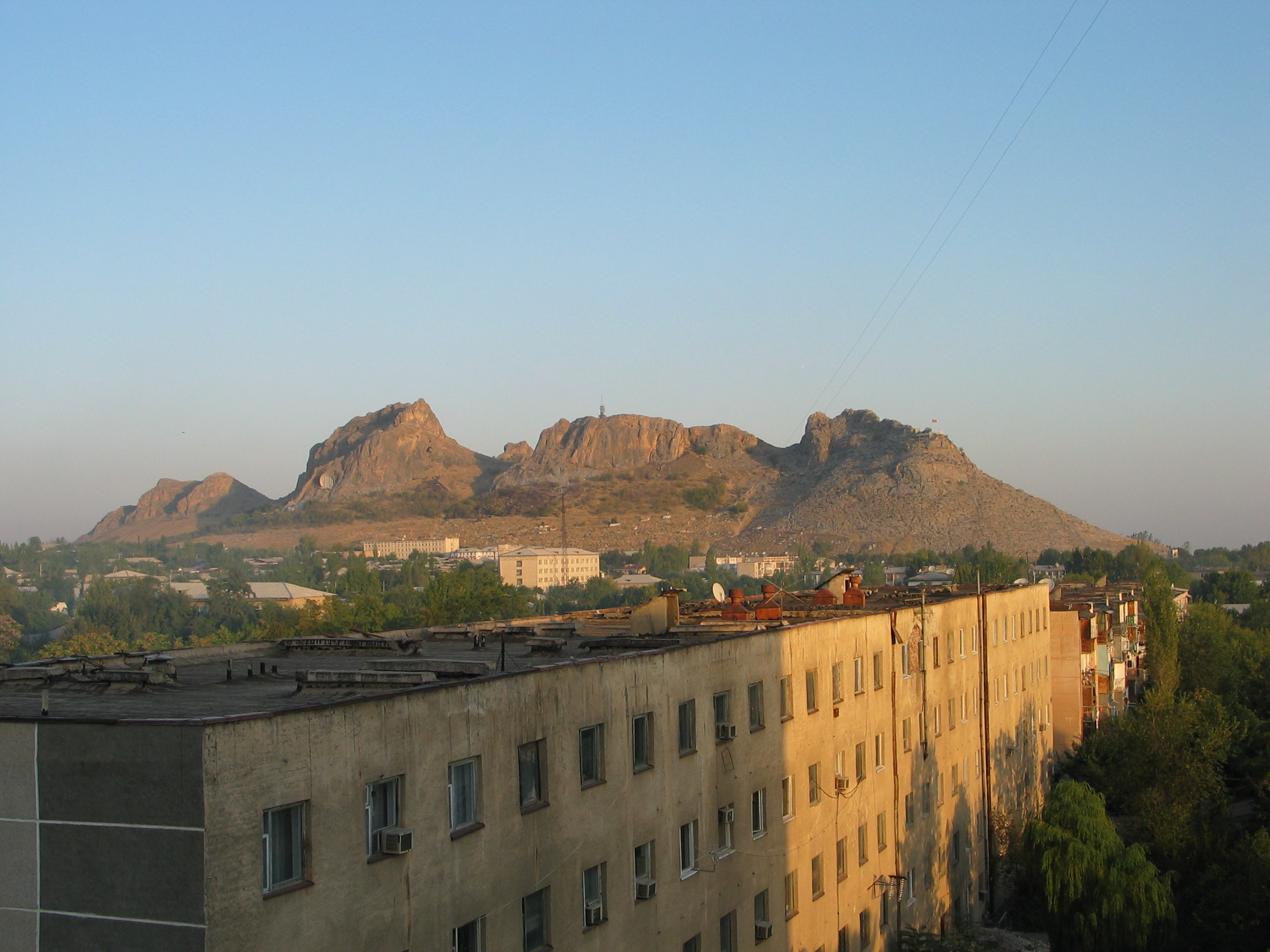
- Clockwise from top: view of Osh from Sulayman Mountain; Sulayman-Too Mosque; statue of Manas; bridge over the Ak-Buura; view of Sulayman Mountain from Osh; flagpole on Sulayman Mountain; Gapar Aytiev Street; and Osh State University

- Flag Seal

- Location in Kyrgyzstan
- Coordinates: 40°31′48″N 72°48′0″E
- Country: Kyrgyzstan
- Region: Osh (extraterritorial)

Government
  - Mayor: Janarbek Akayev.

Area
  - Independent City: 182.5 km^{2} (70.5 sq mi)
- Elevation: 963 m (3,159 ft)

Population (March 2024)
  - Independent City: 454,858
  - Density: 2,492/km^{2} (6,455/sq mi)
  - Urban: 650,000
- Time zone: UTC+6 (KGT)
- Postal code: 723500
- Area codes: 02, Z, O
- Website: oshcity.kg

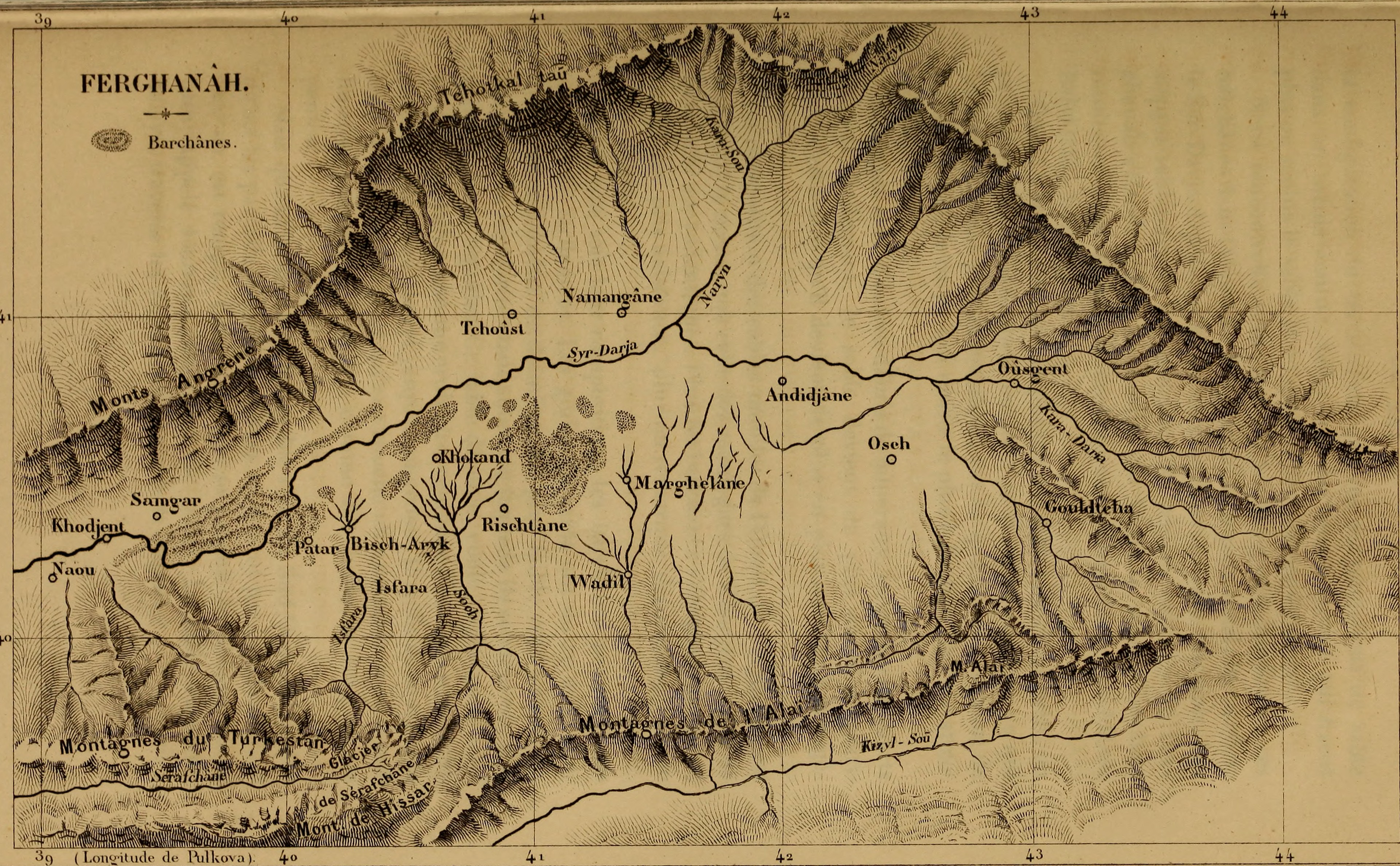
Detailed French map of 1882, showing position of Osh (here spelled "Osch", slightly right of centre, beside the Uzbek city of "Andidjâne") in the Fergana valley

Osh (English: /ɒʃ/, Kyrgyz: Ош, romanized: Oş Kyrgyz: [oʂ], Russian: Ош, romanized: Osh Russian: [oʂ]) is the second-largest city in Kyrgyzstan, located in the Fergana Valley in the south of the country. It is often referred to as the "capital of the south". It is the oldest city in the country (estimated by UNESCO to be more than 3,000 years old) and has served as the administrative center of Osh Region since 1939. The city has an ethnically mixed population of 322,164 in 2021, comprising Kyrgyz, Uzbeks, Ukrainians, Koreans, and other smaller ethnic groups.

== Overview ==
Osh has an important outdoor activity bazaar which has been taking place on the same spot for the past 2,000 years and was a major market along the Silk Road. The bazaar, along the Ak-Buura River, was demolished by the city in 2025 and moved to a modern facility a few kilometers north. The city's industrial base, established during the Soviet period, largely collapsed after the break-up of the Soviet Union and has only recently started to revive.

The proximity of the Uzbekistan border, which cuts through historically linked territories and settlements, deprives Osh of much of its former hinterland and presents a serious obstacle to trade and economic development. Daily flights from Osh Airport link Osh—and hence the southern part of Kyrgyzstan—to the national capital Bishkek and some international destinations, mainly in Russia. Osh has two railway stations and a railway connection to Andijan in neighbouring Uzbekistan, but no passenger traffic and only sporadic freight traffic. Most transport is by road. The recent upgrading of the long and arduous road through the mountains to Bishkek has greatly improved communications.

The city has several monuments, including one to the southern Kyrgyz leader (Kyrgyz: датка, romanized: datqa) Kurmanjan. A 23-meters tall Lenin statue at the city's main square, one of the few remaining Lenin statues in Central Asia, was finally taken down in June 2025. A Russian Orthodox church, reopened after the demise of the Soviet Union, the second-largest mosque in the country, built in 2012 and situated beside the bazaar, and the 16th-century Rabat Abdul Khan Mosque can be found in Osh. The only World Heritage Site in Kyrgyzstan, the Sulayman Mountain, offers a splendid view of Osh and its environs.

This mountain is thought by some researchers and historians to be the famous landmark of antiquity known as the "Stone Tower", which Claudius Ptolemy wrote about in his famous work Geography. It marked the midpoint on the ancient Silk Road, the overland trade route taken by caravans between Europe and Asia. The National Historical and Archaeological Museum Complex Sulayman is carved in the mountain, containing a collection of archaeological, geological, and historical finds and information about local flora and fauna.

Its first Western-style supermarket, Narodnyj, opened in March 2007.

Osh is home to Osh State University, one of the largest universities in Kyrgyzstan.

== Administration ==
Osh city (Ош шаар, "Osh shaar") covers 182.5 square kilometres (70.5 square miles) and, like the capital city of Bishkek, is administered separately and not part of any region, although it is the seat of Osh Region. Besides the city proper, 11 villages are administered by the city: Almalyk, Arek, Gulbaar-Tölöykön, Japalak, Kengesh, Kerme-Too, Orke, Pyatiletka, Teeke and parts of Ozgur and Tölöykön.

== Population ==
Osh is the second-largest city in Kyrgyzstan after the capital city of Bishkek. According to the population estimate of 2021, the city population amounted to 322,164, of which 33,315 resided in the 11 villages that the City of Osh administers. At the 2009 census, 47.9% of the population were Kyrgyz, 44.2% were Uzbeks, 2.5% Russians, 2.2% Turks, 1.1% Tatars and 2.1% other nationalities. The population of the built-up (or metro) area in the surrounding Kara-Suu District and in neighbouring Uzbekistan is estimated at 400,000 inhabitants.

== History ==
=== Early history ===
The name of the city of Osh derives from the river Vakhsh, anthropomorphised there as a water goddess of the same name, who was worshipped (in tandem with Atar, sacred fire) in a Zoroastrian shrine or fire temple situated in the Eagle Cave in the ancient sacred mountain Sulaiman-Too. The river Vakhsh itself, known also as Surkhob or Kyzyl-Suu ( Turkic: "red water") is a tributary of the Amu Darya, the course of the Vakhsh lying outside and to the South of the Fergana valley, rising as it does on the west side of the 3,536m Taunmurun pass (east of the village of Sary-Tash) and flowing southwest to its confluence with the Panj at Takht-i Sangin to form the Amu Darya. Oxus, the ancient name of the Amu Darya, like Osh, is cognate with the river name Vakhsh, revealing that the present day Vakhsh/Kyzyl-Suu was conceived to form the upper reaches of the river now known as the Amu Darya.

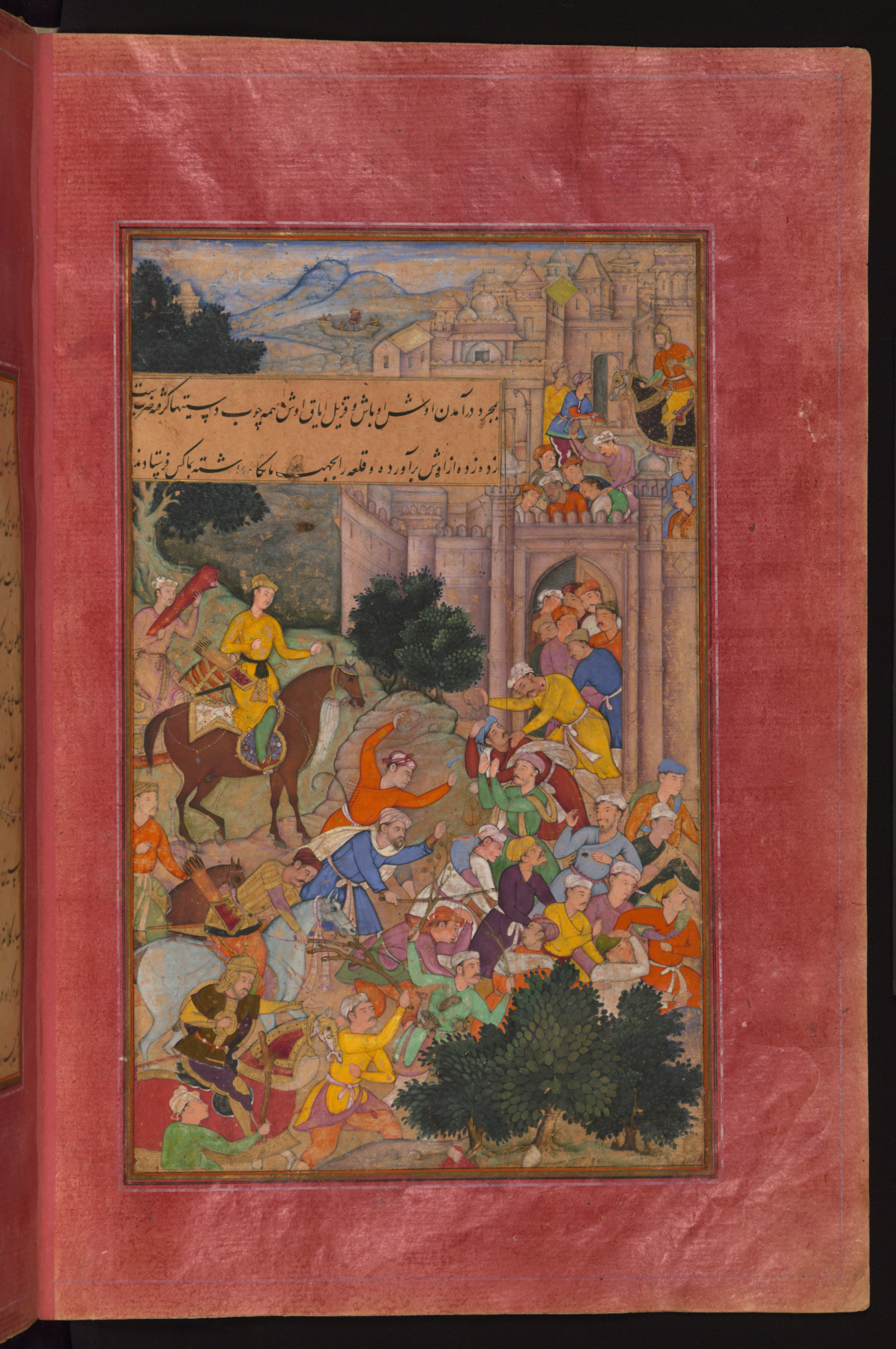
The inhabitants of Osh repulse the occupiers of their city and assist Babur.

The city is among the oldest settlements in Central Asia. Osh was known as early as the 8th century as a center for silk production along the Silk Road. The famous trading route crossed Alay Mountains to reach Kashgar to the east.

Babur, founder of the Mughal Empire and descendant of Tamerlane, was born in nearby Andijan, in the Fergana Valley, pondered his future on Sulayman Mountain and even constructed a mosque atop of the mountain. Babur somehow concludes that the confines of the Fergana would cramp his aspirations as a descendant of famous conquering warrior princes. He wrote of the city:

"There are many sayings about the excellence of Osh. On the southeastern side of the Osh fortress is a well-proportioned mountain called Bara-Koh, where, on its summit, Sultan Mahmud Khan built a pavilion. Farther down, on a spur of the same mountain, I had a porticoed pavilion built in 902 (1496-7)"

=== Imperial Russian and Soviet rule ===
The city was occupied and annexed by the Russian Empire in 1876 when Russia overwhelmed the Central Asian khanates during the so-called "Great Game", the contest between Britain and Russia for dominance in Central Asia. This conquest was achieved and the inclusion to the Russian Empire made by the mid-1880s, with main credit to General von Kaufman and General Mikhail Skobelev.

In the 1960s Osh and other towns in the south of the Kyrgyz SSR began to be industrialized. The population of Osh and other towns in the Fergana Valley that falls within Kyrgyzstan has traditionally consisted of a significant number of ethnic Uzbeks. When Osh started to industrialize the ethnic "Kyrgyz were encouraged to move from the Kyrgyz populated countryside to the cities to work in industrial jobs and public administration." This contributed to the rise of social tension between the two groups.

=== 1990 riots ===
In 1990, shortly before the end of Soviet power in Central Asia, Osh and its environs experienced bloody ethnic clashes between Kyrgyz and Uzbeks. There were about 1,200 casualties, including over 300 dead and 462 seriously injured. The riots broke out over the division of land resources in and around the city.

=== 2010 ethnic violence ===
In 2010, after riots in Bishkek and other major Kyrgyz cities, President Kurmanbek Bakiyev took refuge in the city to hide from protesters denouncing his government and its response to the nation's struggling economy. On May 13, 2010, Bakiyev supporters took over government buildings in Osh and seized the airport, preventing interim government officials from landing. The protesters demanded Bakiev's return, and forced the regional governor to flee. The former Osh regional governor Mamasadyk Bakirov was reinstated.

On June 10, 2010, riots erupted in Osh, killing at least 81 and injuring hundreds of others. "An explosion of violence, destruction and looting in southern Kyrgyzstan on 11–14 June 2010 killed many dozens of Kyrgyz and Uzbek people. The total of over 2000 buildings were destroyed, mostly homes, and deepened the divide between the country's ethnic Kyrgyz and Uzbeks."

Local media reported that gangs of young men armed with sticks and stones smashed shop windows and set cars aflame in the city center. Several buildings and homes across the city were also set on fire. The city's police force proved incapable of restoring order resulting in a state of emergency being declared and the army being mobilised.

The Kyrgyz intelligence agency claimed that the just-deposed president initiated the 2010 violence, Kurmanbek Bakiyev, who is said to have made a deal with foreign narco-jihadist gangs to take over southern Kyrgyzstan and initiate a shariah state in exchange for the Bakiyev family's being returned to controlling Bishkek. However, to the day no serious proof has been presented to the public and media. According to various sources, up to 100,000 ethnic Uzbek refugees fled to Uzbekistan. Many refugee camps have been organized in the Andijan, Fergana and Namangan regions of Uzbekistan for Uzbek citizens of Kyrgyzstan who cross the border seeking safety.

== Geography ==
=== Climate ===
Under the Köppen climate classification, Osh features a continental climate (Dsa), with hot, dry summers and cold winters. Osh receives on average roughly 400 millimeters of precipitation annually, the bulk of which typically falls on the city outside the summer months. Summers are hot in Osh, with average high temperatures routinely exceeding 30 °C. Winters are cold with average temperatures below freezing during a good portion of the season. Spring and autumn are transitional seasons, with temperatures rising during the course of the spring season and falling during the course of the autumn.

Climate data for Osh
| Month | Jan | Feb | Mar | Apr | May | Jun | Jul | Aug | Sep | Oct | Nov | Dec | Year |
|---|---|---|---|---|---|---|---|---|---|---|---|---|---|
| Mean daily maximum °C (°F) | 2.8 (37.0) | 4.3 (39.7) | 11.8 (53.2) | 18.3 (64.9) | 23.3 (73.9) | 27.6 (81.7) | 31.2 (88.2) | 30.5 (86.9) | 25.7 (78.3) | 17.9 (64.2) | 10.2 (50.4) | 4.4 (39.9) | 17.3 (63.2) |
| Mean daily minimum °C (°F) | −3.8 (25.2) | −2.6 (27.3) | 4.0 (39.2) | 9.0 (48.2) | 13.0 (55.4) | 16.7 (62.1) | 18.9 (66.0) | 17.8 (64.0) | 13.7 (56.7) | 8.5 (47.3) | 2.6 (36.7) | −2.5 (27.5) | 7.9 (46.3) |
| Average rainfall mm (inches) | 18 (0.7) | 36 (1.4) | 40 (1.6) | 54 (2.1) | 52 (2.0) | 31 (1.2) | 11 (0.4) | 12 (0.5) | 6 (0.2) | 24 (0.9) | 30 (1.2) | 28 (1.1) | 342 (13.3) |
| Average snowfall cm (inches) | 10.3 (4.1) | 19.0 (7.5) | 6.0 (2.4) | 0.5 (0.2) | 0 (0) | 0 (0) | 0 (0) | 0 (0) | 0 (0) | 0.6 (0.2) | 5.1 (2.0) | 16.2 (6.4) | 57.7 (22.8) |
| Average rainy days | 6.3 | 7.9 | 11.5 | 14.6 | 13.3 | 10.9 | 7.0 | 5.3 | 5.0 | 6.6 | 7.5 | 5.7 | 101.6 |
| Average snowy days | 7.5 | 7.3 | 2.7 | 0.2 | 0 | 0 | 0 | 0 | 0 | 0.4 | 2.7 | 6.8 | 27.6 |
| Average relative humidity (%) | 67 | 69 | 58 | 53 | 48 | 40 | 32 | 32 | 34 | 44 | 53 | 61 | 49 |
| Mean daily sunshine hours | 7.1 | 7.1 | 8.0 | 8.6 | 10.8 | 11.7 | 11.5 | 9.9 | 9.8 | 8.9 | 6.5 | 5.9 | 8.8 |
| Mean daily daylight hours | 9.7 | 10.7 | 12.0 | 13.3 | 14.4 | 15.0 | 14.7 | 13.7 | 12.5 | 11.1 | 9.9 | 9.3 | 12.2 |
| Average ultraviolet index | 2 | 2 | 4 | 5 | 6 | 6 | 6 | 6 | 4 | 4 | 2 | 2 | 4 |
Source: Weather Atlas

== Cityscape ==
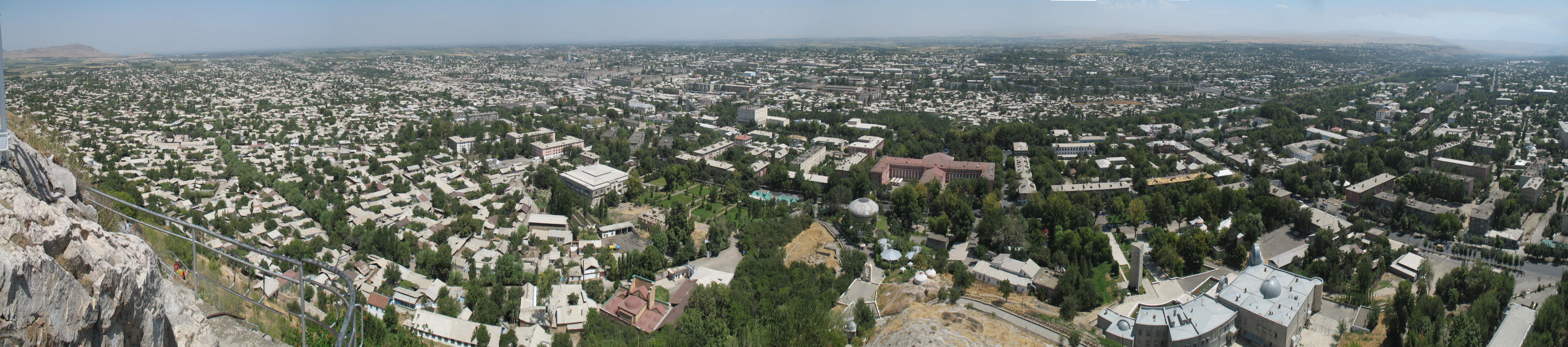
Downtown Osh, seen from Sulayman Too on 7 August 2006

== Notable people ==
- Anvar Artykov (born 1951), a Kyrgyz politician, and current member of the Supreme Council of Kyrgyzstan. He served as governor of Osh Region between March and December 2005, and was previously a deputy between 1990 and 2000.
- Aynuru Altybayeva (born 1958), a Kyrgyz politician, and current member of the Supreme Council of Kyrgyzstan
- Roza Otunbayeva (born 1950), a Kyrgyz diplomat and politician who served as the President of Kyrgyzstan from April 2010 until 1 December 2011
- Zhantoro Satybaldiyev (born 1956), a Kyrgyz politician who was Prime Minister of Kyrgyzstan from September 2012 until March 2014
- Susana Camaladinova (born 1983), a Ukrainian singer of Crimean Tatar origin, winner of the Eurovision Song Contest 2016

== Twin towns and sister cities ==
Osh is twinned with:

- Yozgat, Turkey
- Manisa, Turkey
- Jeddah, Saudi Arabia
- Azerbaijan, Ganja

== See also ==
- Bakyt Beshimov
- Jamala
- Roza Otunbayeva
- Alay Valley
