= Ahmet Şahin =

Ahmet Şâhin may refer to:

- Ahmet Şâhin (writer) (born 1935), Turkish author
- Ahmet Şahin (footballer) (born 1978), Turkish footballer
