= Yozgat YHT railway station =

YOZGAT YHT

General information
- Location: Divanli Köyü 66000 Yozgat Merkez/Yozgat; Turkey
- Coordinates: 39.7583°N 34.8398°E
- System: TCDD high-speed rail station
- Owner: Turkish State Railways
- Line: Ankara-Sivas high-speed railway
- Platforms: 2 side platforms
- Tracks: 4

Construction
- Structure type: At-grade with bridge access

History
- Opened: 26 April 2023

Services
Preceding station	TCDD Taşımacılık	Following station
Kırıkkale YHT towards Ankara	Yüksek Hızlı Tren	Sorgun towards Sivas
Location

Yozgat YHT railway station, short for Yozgat Yüksek Hızlı Tren station (Turkish: Yozgat Yüksek Hızlı Tren garı), is a railway station located just north of the village of Divanlı, about 7.5 km (4.7 mi) south of Yozgat.

Due to the mountainous terrain of the land, the railway was not built within the city of Yozgat. The station has become the realization of the Turkish State Railways' 70-year-old plan to build a railway line to Yozgat as the original railway was planned to be built from Yerköy to Yozgat in 1948.
