= Subdivisions of Kyrgyzstan =

Kyrgyzstan has three levels of local government. The top level is formed by the regions (Kyrgyz: облус, romanized: oblus) and the cities of republican significance. The regions are divided into districts (Kyrgyz: район, romanized: rayon) and cities of regional significance. The districts are divided into cities of district significance, urban-type settlements (Kyrgyz: шаар тибиндеги посёлок, romanized: shaar tibindegi posyolok) and village communities (Kyrgyz: айыл аймагы, romanized: ayyl aymagy).

As of 2021, there are:

- First level:
  - 7 regions
  - 2 cities of republican significance (Bishkek and Osh)
- Second level:
  - 44 districts, including 4 city districts of Bishkek
  - 13 cities of regional significance
- Third level:
  - 17 cities of district significance
  - 12 urban-type settlements
  - 453 village communities

Subdivisions of Kyrgyzstan (in Kyrgyz)
