= Japalak =

- Location within Kyrgyzstan
- Coordinates: 40°29′24″N 72°45′36″E
- Country: Kyrgyzstan
- Region: Osh City
- Elevation: 1,040 m (3,410 ft)

Population (2021)
  - Total: 4,181
- Time zone: UTC+6

Japalak (Kyrgyz: Жапалак) is a village in the city of Osh, Kyrgyzstan. Its population was 4,181 in 2021.

== Population ==
Historical population
Year	Pop.	±% p.a.
1999	4,325	—
2009	3,677	−1.61%
2021	4,181	+1.08%
Note: resident population; Sources:
