= Urban-type settlement =

Official designation for an urban locality in some countries of the former Soviet Union

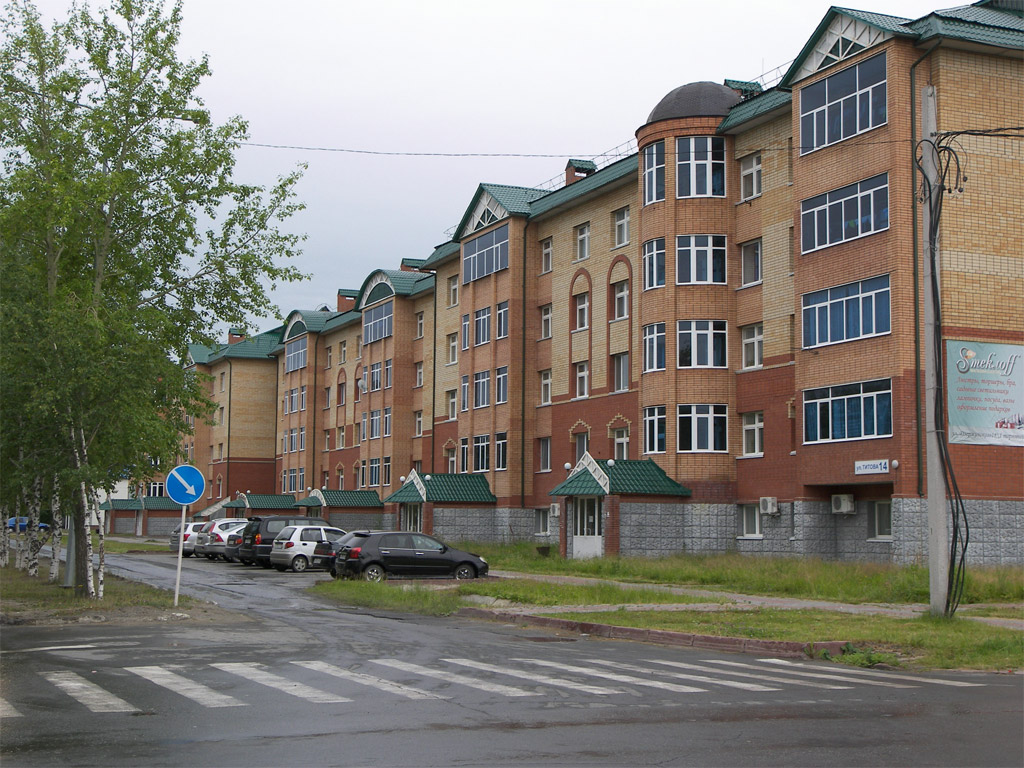
Urban housing in Mezhdurechensky, Khanty-Mansi Autonomous Okrug, Russia, an example of urban-type settlement

Urban-type settlement (Note: Russian: посёлок городского типа, romanized: posyolok gorodskogo tipa, abbreviated: Russian: п.г.т., romanized: p.g.t.; Ukrainian: селище міського типу, romanized: selyshche mis'koho typu, abbreviated: Ukrainian: с.м.т., romanized: s.m.t.; Belarusian: пасёлак гарадскога тыпу, romanized: pasiolak haradskoha typu; Polish: osiedle typu miejskiego; Bulgarian: селище от градски тип, romanized: selishte ot gradski tip; Romanian: așezare de tip urban/orășenesc.) is an official designation for lesser urbanized settlements, used in several Central and Eastern European countries. The term was primarily used in the Soviet Union and later also for a short time in socialist Bulgaria and socialist Poland. It remains in use today in nine of the post-Soviet states.

The designation was used in all 15 member republics of the Soviet Union from 1922. It was introduced later in Poland (1954) and Bulgaria (1964). All the urban-type settlements in Poland were transformed into other types of settlement (town or village) in 1972. In Bulgaria and five of the post-Soviet republics (Armenia, Moldova, and the three Baltic states), they were changed in the early 1990s, while Ukraine followed suit in 2023. Today, this term is still used in the other nine post-Soviet republics – Azerbaijan, Belarus, Georgia, Kazakhstan, Kyrgyzstan, Russia, Tajikistan, Turkmenistan, Uzbekistan. It is also used in Transnistria, an unrecognised breakaway state in Moldova.

What counts as an urban-type settlement differs between time periods and countries and often between different divisions of a single country. However, the criteria generally focus on the presence of urban infrastructure or resort facilities for urban residents.

== Soviet Union ==
In the Soviet Union, the criteria of urban-type settlements were set independently by the Soviet republics. Those criteria, however, only differed very slightly from one republic to another.

=== Russian SFSR ===
In the Russian SFSR, urban-type settlements were subdivided into three types:

- Work settlements (рабочие посёлки): localities with factories, mining industry, power stations, construction industry, with population of at least 3,000 and with at least 85% of the population being workers, professionals, and the members of their families;
- Resort settlements (курортные посёлки): localities focusing on resort and health facilities (around beaches, mineral water spas, etc.), with population of at least 2,000, with at least 50% of the average annual population being non-permanent residents;
- Suburban settlements (dacha settlements, дачные посёлки): settlements with a focus on private summer-time and weekend recreation, with no more than 25% of the permanent population being employed in the agricultural sector.

=== Ukrainian SSR ===
In 1981, the Presidium of the Verkhovna Rada of the Ukrainian SSR defined an urban-type settlement as follows: "To the category of an urban-type settlement may be included any settlement located near industrial enterprises, buildings, railroad connections, hydro-technical constructions, and enterprises in production and refining of agrarian products as well as settlements that include higher or middle occupation educational establishments, science-researching institutions, sanatoria, and other stationary treatment and recreation establishments that have a state housing provided to no less than 2,000 inhabitants.

The term was introduced in Ukraine in 1920s and became official since the resolution of the Central Executive Committee of Ukraine of October 28, 1925 replacing all towns (mistechko) as urban-type settlement. In modern times, Ukraine passed Law No. 8263 in 2023, which abolished the formal use of this term as part of ongoing decommunization efforts.

== Modern usage ==
=== Azerbaijan ===
As of 2011, there were 256 urban-type settlements in Azerbaijan.

=== Belarus ===
According to a 1998 law of Belarus, there are three categories of urban-type settlement in the country:

- Urban settlements: with population over 2,000, industrial enterprises and developed residential infrastructure.
- Resort settlements: with population of at least 2,000, sanatoriums, resorts or other health recuperation establishments, and developed residential infrastructure.
- Worker settlements: with population at least 500, servicing industrial enterprises, construction sites, railroad stations, electric stations, or other industrial objects.

=== Georgia ===
As of 2014, there were 47 urban-type settlements in Georgia. Eight of them are located on the territory of the partially recognized states of Abkhazia and South Ossetia and are de facto not under the control of the Georgian government.

=== Kazakhstan ===
As of 2019, there were 48 urban-type settlements in Kazakhstan.

=== Kyrgyzstan ===
In accordance with the 2008 Law on Administrative and Territorial Subdivision of Kyrgyzstan, urban-type settlements are those that comprise economically significant facilities such as industrial plants, railway stations, construction sites, etc., as well as settlements with a recreational potential with population of at least 2,000. In exceptional cases, administrative, economic and cultural centers with a potential of economical development and population growth can be classified as urban-type settlements.

=== Russia ===
==== Inhabited localities ====
In modern Russia, the task of deciding whether an inhabited locality meets the criteria of urban-type settlements is delegated to the federal subjects. In most cases, the federal subject's legislative body is responsible for all administrative and territorial changes, including granting and revoking of the urban-type settlement and town status.

==== Administrative divisions ====
Apart from being used to refer to a type of inhabited locality, the term "urban-type settlement" and its variations is also used to refer to a division of an administrative district, and sometimes to a division administratively subordinated to a city district of a city of federal subject significance. This kind of administrative division is equal in status to the towns of district significance and selsoviets, and is normally centered on an inhabited locality with urban-type settlement status. As of 2013, the following types of such entities are recognized:

- Resort settlement (курортный посёлок): in Nizhny Novgorod Oblast
- Settlement (посёлок): in the Republic of Dagestan and the Sakha Republic; in Krasnoyarsk and Stavropol Krais
- Settlement administration (поселковая администрация): in Altai Krai
- Settlement administrative okrug (поселковый административный округ): in Bryansk Oblast
- Settlement council (поссовет): in the Republic of Bashkortostan and the Udmurt Republic; in Altai Krai; in Tambov Oblast
- Settlement municipal formation (муниципальное образование со статусом поселения): in Leningrad Oblast
- Settlement okrug (поселковый округ): in Krasnodar Krai; in Belgorod and Ulyanovsk Oblasts
- Suburban settlement (дачный посёлок): in Moscow and Omsk Oblasts
- Urban settlement (городское поселение): in the Chuvash Republic; in Amur, Rostov, Smolensk, Tver, and Voronezh Oblasts
- Urban settlement (urban-type settlement) (городской посёлок (посёлок городского типа): in Kostroma Oblast
- Urban-type settlement (посёлок городского типа): in the Republic of Buryatia, the Chechen Republic, the Mari El Republic, and the Republic of Tatarstan; in Astrakhan, Kemerovo, Kirov, Murmansk, Nizhny Novgorod, Oryol, Sakhalin, Tula, Volgograd, and Vologda Oblasts
- Urban-type settlement administrative territory (административная территория – посёлок городского типа): in the Komi Republic
- Urban-type settlement of district significance (посёлок городского типа районного значения): in Kaliningrad Oblast and Nenets Autonomous Okrug
- Urban-type settlement (settlement council) (посёлок городского типа (поссовет)): in the Republic of Khakassia
- Urban-type settlement under district jurisdiction (посёлок городского типа районного подчинения): in Kurgan Oblast
- Urban-type settlement (urban settlement) (посёлок городского типа (городское поселение)): in the Tuva Republic
- Urban-type settlement with jurisdictional territory (посёлок городского типа с подчинённой территорией): in Arkhangelsk Oblast
- Work settlement (рабочий посёлок): in the Republic of Mordovia; in Krasnoyarsk Krai; in Belgorod, Chelyabinsk, Kursk, Moscow, Nizhny Novgorod, Novosibirsk, Omsk, Penza, Ryazan, and Yaroslavl Oblasts

=== Tajikistan ===
As of January 1, 2018, there were 57 urban-type settlements in Tajikistan.

=== Turkmenistan ===
As of February 1, 2016, there were 76 urban-type settlements in Turkmenistan.

=== Uzbekistan ===
As of January 1, 2011, 1,065 settlements have urban-type settlement status in Uzbekistan.

== Former usage ==
=== Armenia ===
Urban-type settlements existed in Armenia until the 1990s. Currently, all of them have been converted into cities or villages.

=== Baltic states ===
In Estonia, the urban-type settlements were created in 1945 during the Estonian SSR. In the 1990s most of them were transformed into cities.

The urban-type settlements existed in Latvia from 1949 to 1993, when they were converted into cities and rural settlements.

Lithuania formerly used the urban-type settlement (Lithuanian: miesto tipo gyvenvietė, m.t.g.) system until 1995.

=== Bulgaria ===
In Bulgaria, the first urban-type settlements (Bulgarian: селище от градски тип) were formed in 1964. In the 1990s they were transformed into villages and cities.

=== Moldova ===
The urban-type settlement system was used on the territory of Moldova since 1924. In the 1990s they were converted either into cities or rural settlements. The disputed and unrecognized Transnistria continues to use this system.

=== Poland ===
The urban-type settlements (Polish: osiedle typu miejskiego) were used in the Polish People's Republic from 1954 to 1972. Nowadays, Poland has cities, villages and settlements.

=== Ukraine ===
Grandfathered from the Ukrainian SSR, Ukraine formerly used the urban-type settlement (Ukrainian: селище міського типу, с.м.т.) system until 2023. On 24 October 2023 President Volodymyr Zelenskyy signed Law No. 8263 that abolished the concepts of "urban-type settlement" in Ukraine. The law came into an effect on January 26, 2024. Since then, settlements that belonged to the category of urban-type settlements have been classified as settlements (Ukrainian: селище). The law also redefined the status of settlement, which along with a village is considered a rural populated place, but unlike a village is more populated and maybe somewhat urbanized. The law was meant to facilitate "de-Sovietization of the procedure for solving certain issues of the administrative and territorial system of Ukraine".

In 1991, there were 921 urban-type settlements in Ukraine.

== See also ==
- Administrative divisions of Georgia (country)
- Political divisions of Russia
- Regions of Belarus
- Subdivisions of Kyrgyzstan
- Villages of China
