= Yozgat Clock Tower =

Clock tower in Yozgat, Turkey

Coordinates: 39.8221°N 34.8082°E

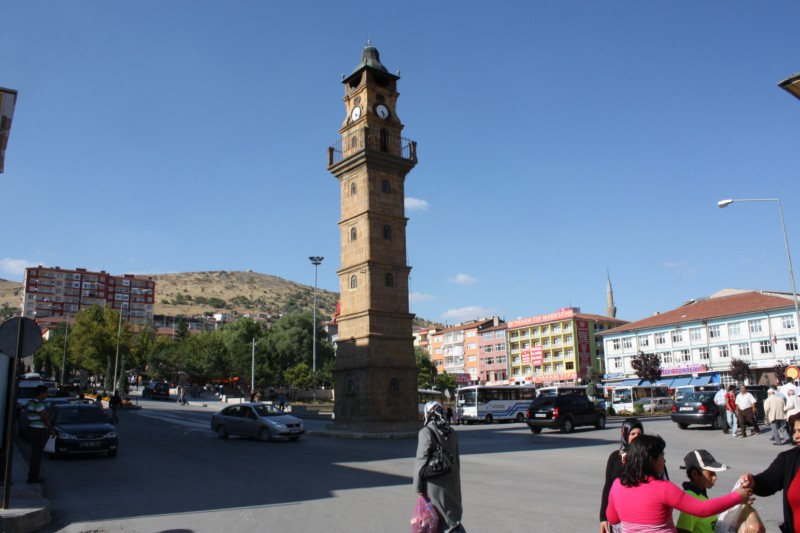
Yozgat Clock Tower

The Yozgat Clock Tower is an Ottoman-era monument in the city center of Yozgat, Turkey.

It was commissioned by mayor Ahmet Tevfikizade and built by local stonemason Şakir in 1908.

The tower consists of six or seven stories with a balcony around the upper section, then a French-made clock, and finally a bell-shaped cap or cone of wood covering the top. It is almost 17 m (56 ft) tall, with a square base measuring 3.5 m (11 ft) by 3.5 m (11 ft). The walls are of cut stone, 30 cm (12 in) to 40 cm (16 in) thick.

Structural assessments suggest that it will be seriously damaged during any severe earthquake.
