= Elmadağ Bridge =

Elmadağ Bridge Elmadağ Köprüsü
- Coordinates: 39°52′11″N 33°24′55″E
- Carries: Ankara-Sivas high-speed railway
- Crosses: Kızılırmak
- Official name: Viaduct 15
- Named for: Elmadağ
- Owner: Turkish State Railways

Characteristics
- Material: Reinforced concrete
- Total length: 1,437 m (4,715 ft)
- Height: 87 m (285 ft)
- No. of spans: 22

Rail characteristics
- No. of tracks: 2
- Track gauge: 1,435 mm (4 ft 8 1/2 in) standard gauge
- Electrified: 25 kV AC, 50 Hz OHLE

History
- Constructed by: Doğuş İnşaat
- Construction start: 2014
- Opened: 26 April 2023

Location
- Interactive map of Elmadağ Bridge

The Elmadağ Bridge (Turkish: Elmadağ Köprüsü), officially designated as Viaduct 15 (Turkish: Viyadükt 15) or V15, is a railway bridge near Kırıkkale, Turkey, on the Ankara-Sivas high-speed railway. With a total length of 1,437 m (4,715 ft) and consisting of 22 spans, the bridge crosses the Kızılırmak River as well as the Trans-Anatolian railway. Elmadağ Bridge is also the highest railway bridge in Turkey, standing 87 m (285 ft) tall.

The bridge is one of four viaducts between Kırıkkale and Elmadağ, with a total length of 6,216 m (20,394 ft). It opened on 26 April 2023, along with the Ankara-Sivas high-speed railway.

== See also ==
- Yüksek Hızlı Tren
- Sakarya Viaduct
