= Kırıkkale YHT railway station =

Railway station just north of Kırıkkale, Turkey

KIRIKKALE YHT

General information
- Location: Turkey
- Coordinates: 39.867437°N 33.535192°E
- System: TCDD high-speed rail station
- Owner: Turkish State Railways
- Line: Ankara-Sivas high-speed railway
- Platforms: 2 side platforms
- Tracks: 4

History
- Opened: 26 April 2023

Services
Preceding station	TCDD Taşımacılık	Following station
Elmadağ YHT towards Ankara	Yüksek Hızlı Tren	Yerköy YHT towards Sivas
Location

Kırıkkale YHT railway station, short for Kırıkkale Yüksek Hızlı Tren railway station (Turkish: Kırıkkale Yüksek Hızlı Tren garı), is a railway station located just north of Kırıkkale, Turkey. The station is located along the D.200 highway on the northern perimeter of the city, and will service high-speed trains along the Ankara–Sivas high-speed railway.

Kırıkkale YHT station is one of two stations in Kırıkkale, together with Kırıkkale station, which is serviced by conventional trains. The YHT stands for HSR or High-speed railway.
