= Ankara–Sivas high-speed railway =

Turkish high-speed railway line

Overview
- Status: In operation
- Owner: Turkish State Railways
- Locale: Central Anatolia
- Termini: Ankara YHT station, Ankara; Sivas station, Sivas Sivas YHT station, Sivas (Future)

Service
- Type: High-speed rail
- System: Turkish State Railways
- Operator: TCDD Taşımacılık
- Depots: Etimesgut; Sivas

History
- Opened: Trial run as an evacuation service: 15 February 2023 (Sivas-Kırıkkale); Scheduled operations: 26 April 2023

Technical
- Line length: 406 km (252.28 mi)
- Num of tracks: Double track
- Character: Trunk
- Track gauge: 1,435 mm (4 ft 8 1/2 in) standard gauge
- Loading gauge: TCDD gross gauge
- Minimum radius: 3,500 m
- Electrification: 25 kV, 50 Hz AC overhead line
- Operating speed: 250 km/h (160 mph)
- Maximum incline: 18‰
Route map
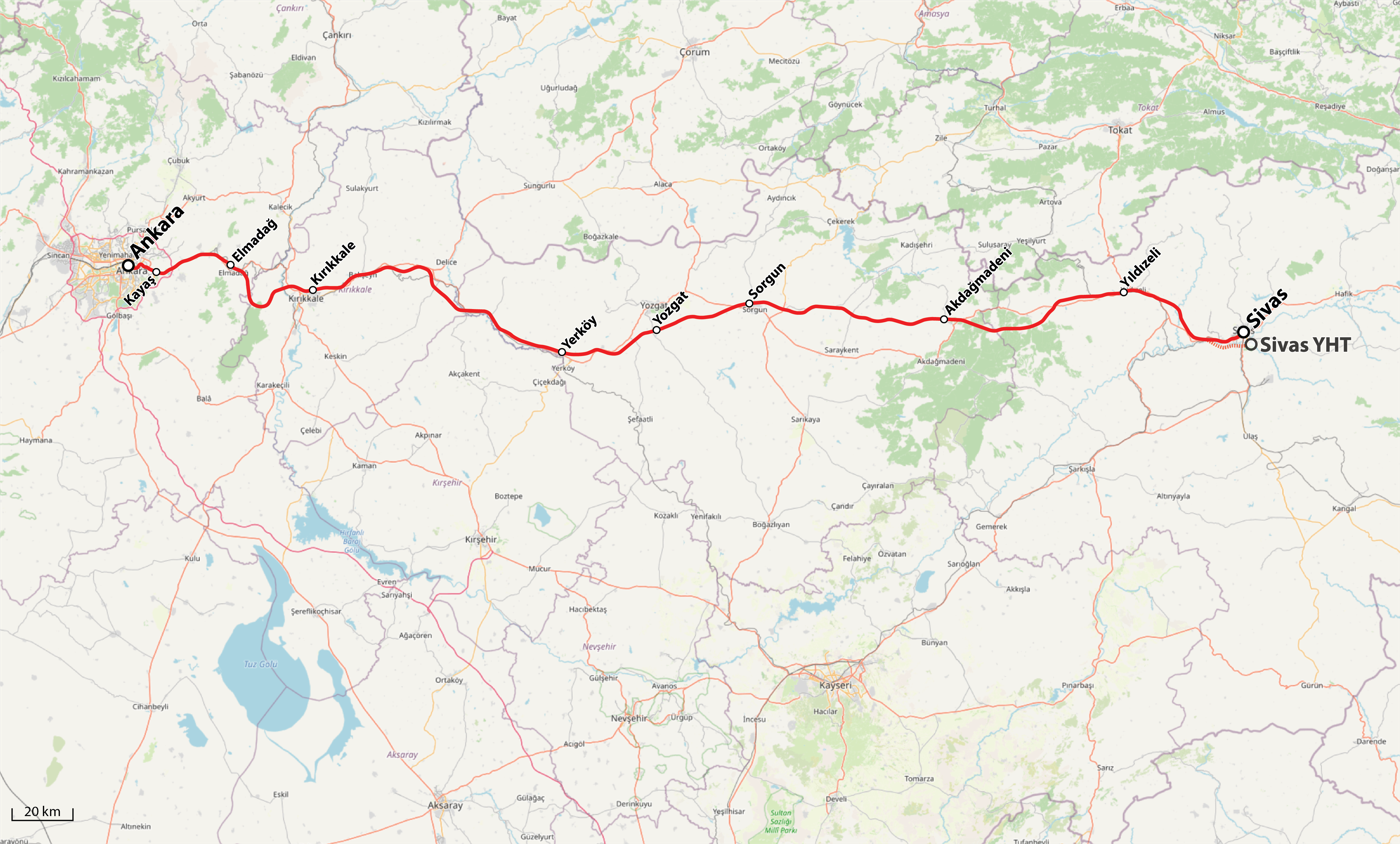
(Click to expand)

The Ankara–Sivas high-speed railway (Turkish: Ankara–Sivas yüksek hızlı demiryolu), is a 406 km (252 mi) long high-speed railway in Turkey and is the second longest high-speed railway in the country after the Ankara–Istanbul high-speed railway. Travel time between Ankara and Sivas was reduced to 2 hours and 50 minutes, from around 9 hours and 30 minutes with conventional trains. The railway will also serve as an extension of the Ankara-Istanbul HSR with a total journey time from Istanbul to Sivas at around 7 hours. The line was opened on April 26, 2023.

== History and the project ==
In order to reduce travel time between Ankara and Sivas, TCDD undertook a survey for a new high-speed railway line in 2004. Construction began in 2008 with some pauses in 2010 due to changes in the project. When completed, the Ankara-Sivas journey time is expected to be reduced to 2 hours and 50 minutes compared with a previous travel time of 12 hours. Testing on the line began in March 2020. The line partially opened in February 2023, and other portions started service in the April of the same year.

== Stations ==
There are a total of 11 stations on the railway, five of which are in operation. With the exception of Ankara, Kayaş and Sivas stations, every station on the railway has been built exclusively for high-speed train use. When the railway first opened to revenue service, on 26 April 2023, only two new stations opened: Kırıkkale YHT and Yozgat YHT. The remaining stations (not counting the existing stations) will be opened within 2023.

Station listing
Province	City	Distance from Ankara	Station	YHT services	Additional rail services/connections
Ankara	Ankara	0 km (0 mi)	Ankara YHT	Ank-Siv	TCDD Taşımacılık: Ankara Express, Başkentray, Eastern Express, İzmir Blue Train, Lake Van Express, Southern Kurtalan Express, 4 Sept. Blue Train; Ankara Metro: M1, M4, (A1) Ankaray
Ankara	Ankara	12 km (7.5 mi)	Kayaş	Ank-Siv	TCDD Taşımacılık: Başkentray, Eastern Express, Lake Van Express, Southern Kurtalan Express, 4 Sept. Blue Train
Ankara	Elmadağ	35 km (22 mi)	Elmadağ YHT		
Kırıkkale	Kırıkkale	76 km (47 mi)	Kırıkkale YHT	Ank-Siv	
Yozgat	Yerköy	169 km (105 mi)	Yerköy YHT		
Yozgat	Yozgat	204 km (127 mi)	Yozgat YHT	Ank-Siv	
Yozgat	Sorgun	234 km (145 mi)	Sorgun YHT	Ank-Siv	
Yozgat	Akdağmadeni	298 km (185 mi)	Akdağmadeni YHT	Ank-Siv	
Sivas	Yıldızeli	360 km (220 mi)	Yıldızeli YHT		
Sivas	Sivas	406 km (252 mi)	Sivas	Ank-Siv	TCDD Taşımacılık: Eastern Express, Lake Van Express, Southern Kurtalan Express, 4 Sept. Blue Train
Sivas	Sivas	407 km (253 mi)	Sivas YHT		

== Sections and speeds ==
Constructions are divided into four sections:

Section	Length	Max Speed	Notes
Ankara Central - Kayaş	12 km	140 km/h	
Kayaş - Kırıkkale	62 km	250 km/h	Opened in April 2023
Kırıkkale - Yerköy	79 km	250 km/h	Opened in February 2023, initially as an evacuation service for the victims of 2023 Kahramanmaraş earthquake
Yerköy - Sivas	253 km	250 km/h	Opened in February 2023, initially as an evacuation service for the victims of 2023 Kahramanmaraş earthquake
Sivas Yapı connection	460 m	180 km/h	Short link track connecting to the classic train route approaching the city from the west

== See also ==
- High-speed rail in Turkey
- Yüksek Hızlı Tren
- Elmadağ Bridge
