= Ahmet Şâhin (writer) =

Turkish author (born 1935)

- Born: 1935 (age 90–91); Yozgat, Turkey
- Occupation: journalist

Ahmet Şâhin (also spelled Ahmed Shahin; born 1935) is a Turkish writer.

== Life ==
Şâhin came to Istanbul in 1952 from Yozgat. As a protégé of Gönenli Mehmed Efendi, he studied tefsir, hadis, kelâm and fıkıh (each a subject of Islamic study) under Hüsrev Efendi, Ömer Nasuhi Bilmen, Bekir Hâkı and Dersâm Selahaddin. In 1960, Şâhin was appointed to Süleymaniye Mosque. Şâhin's essays were first published in the newspaper Hüradam.
