= Yozgat =

City in Turkey

- Municipality
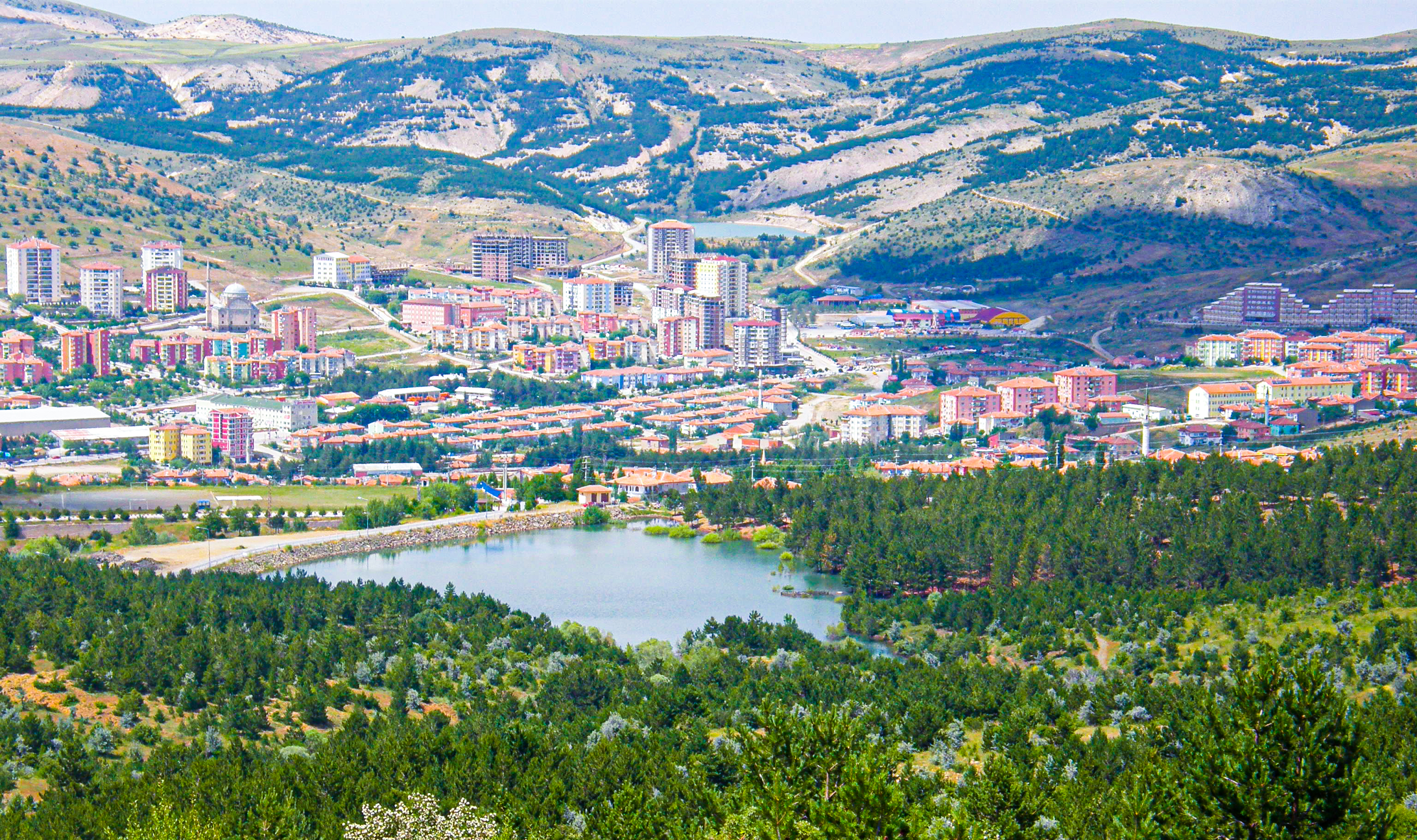

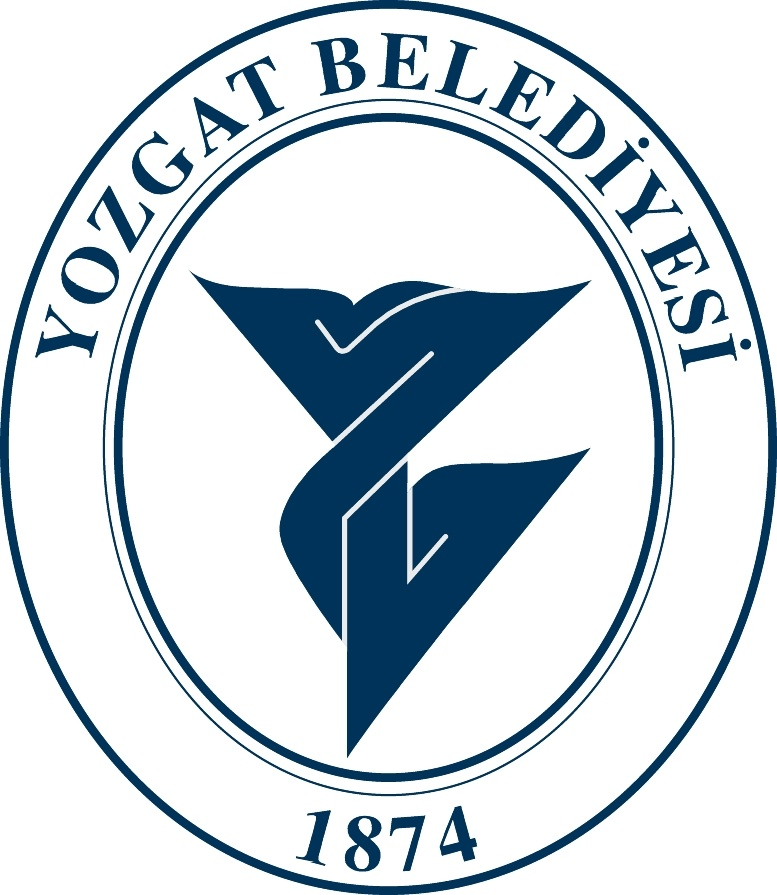
- Logo

- Location within Turkey Location within Turkey Central Anatolia
- Coordinates: 39°49′15″N 34°48′30″E
- Country: Turkey
- Province: Yozgat
- District: Yozgat

Government
  - Mayor: Kazım Arslan (YRP)
- Elevation: 1,300 m (4,300 ft)
- Population (2022): 92,643
- Time zone: UTC+3 (TRT)
- Postal code: 66000
- Area code: 0354
- Website: www.yozgat.bel.tr

Yozgat is a city in the Central Anatolia Region of Turkey. It is the seat of Yozgat Province and Yozgat District. Its population is 92,643 (2022).

== History ==
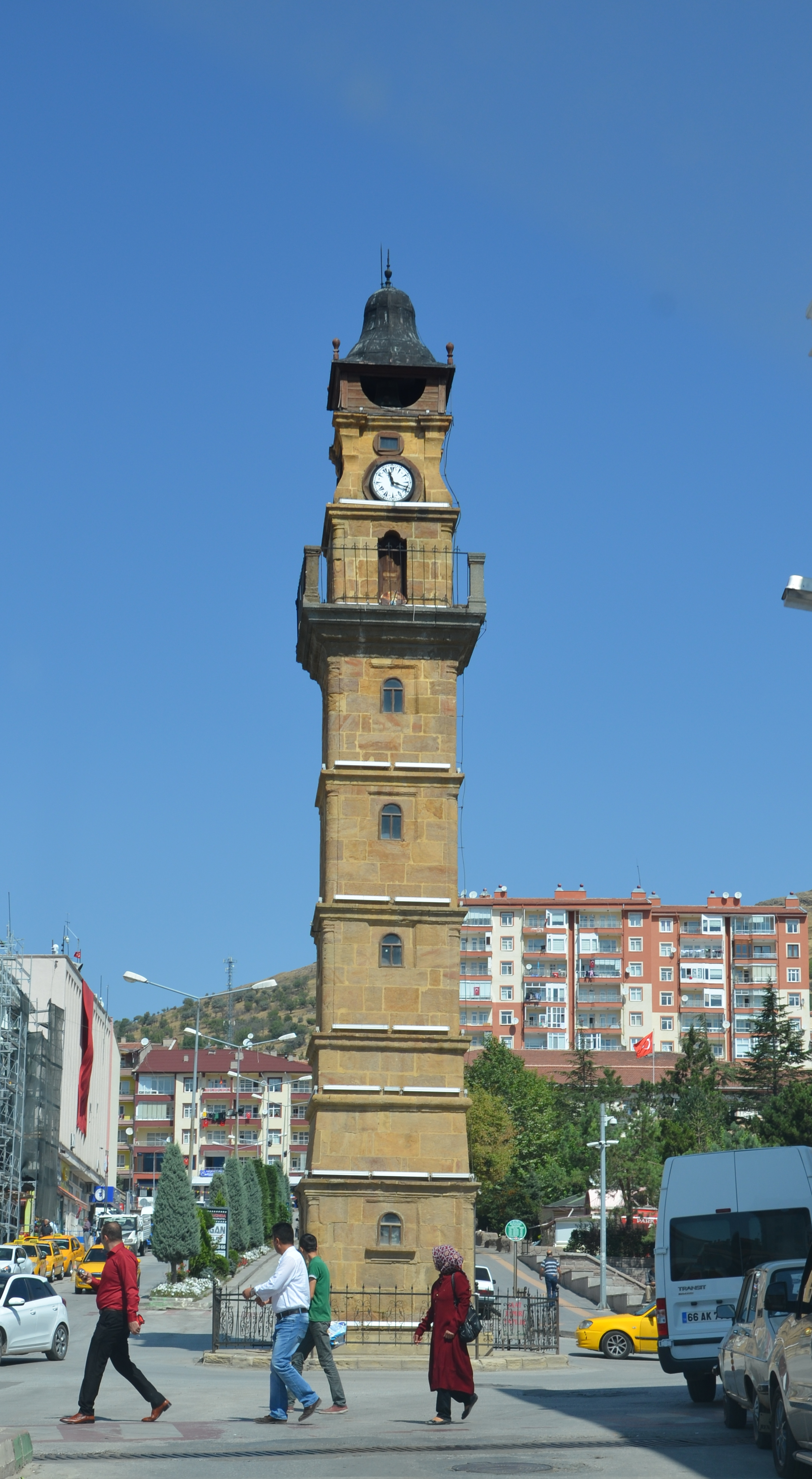
Yozgat clock tower

Formerly known as Bozok, the area surrounding Yozgat hosted many civilizations such as that of Pteria and Corniaspa (east of Yozgat).

The first surveys were started in the year 1993. Since then archaeologists have uncovered countless artifacts belonging to 5 different ancient civilizations from the area and as well as artifacts that belong to 5 different eras – the Bronze, Hellenistic, Hittite, Copper and Upper Byzantine eras.

Surface excavations and surveys were also undertaken on the Kerkenes plateau by Dr. Geoffery Summers, a British archaeologist. The plateau is believed to be the home to the lost city of Pteria. The search for this lost city as well as other old world constructions began in 2013, and it plans to go on till the month of August as well. The expedition covers an area which is surrounded by walls and is known to date back to almost 2600 years.

According to historical reports, Pteria was destroyed, burned and abandoned during the Battle of Pteria between the Lydians and the Medes. This battle ended during a solar eclipse on 28 May 585 BC, and it was understood to be an omen that the gods wanted the fighting to stop.

Another excavation site in the region that deserves to be mentioned is in Kusaklu Tumulus. A team headed by Dr. Stefania Mazzoni has been working at the site since the year 2008, and it is believed that the Hittite civilization as well as the city of Zippalandawas once existed in the region. As a part of these excavations a 2000-year-old Roman bath that was said to be used to heal people from their wounds has been discovered. Traces of the Roman, Seljuq, Byzantine and Ottoman eras have also been found in the region.

With so much of history yet to be uncovered from a single city. It has already been proved that the area was home to numerous civilizations that date all the way back to the Roman era.

After the old administrative center of the region, Tavium (Büyüknefes), became ruined, a new centre was created by Çapanoğlu, the founder of a powerful derebey family and called Bozok.

=== Ottoman era ===
The Ottoman Empire annexed Yozgat in 1398. At around 1911, it was the chief town of a sanjak of the same name in the Ankara Vilayet. There was a trade in yellow madder (Stil de grain yellow) and mohair. The sanjak was very fertile, and contained good breeding-grounds in which cattle, horses and even camels were reared for the local agriculture and foreign trade.

Yozgat was the site of a prisoner of war camp in the First World War, holding British and Empire officers captured at the Siege of Kut, including E. H. Jones and C. W. Hill, whose escape attempts were recounted in the book The Road to En-dor.

== Geography ==
The town is located at an elevation of 4,380 ft (1,335 m), situated 105 mi (170 km) east of Ankara, near the head of a narrow valley through which the Ankara–Sivas road runs. Like much of the Anatolian Plateau, the lands around Yozgat have been deforested over thousands of years of human habitation. This makes the climate and weather harsh, in summers and winters. However, Turkey has taken great steps to reforest at least some of the region.

=== Climate ===
Yozgat has a continental climate (Köppen: Dsb, Trewartha: Dc) with cold, snowy winters and warm, dry summers. Hottest month averages at 26 °C (79 °F) during the day. Winter temperatures can drop as low as −20 °C (−4.0 °F) at the height of the season.

Climate data for Yozgat (1991–2020, extremes 1929–2023)
Month	Jan	Feb	Mar	Apr	May	Jun	Jul	Aug	Sep	Oct	Nov	Dec	Year
Record high °C (°F)	15.4 (59.7)	18.5 (65.3)	25.0 (77.0)	29.5 (85.1)	31.4 (88.5)	33.1 (91.6)	38.8 (101.8)	37.4 (99.3)	35.4 (95.7)	30.1 (86.2)	22.9 (73.2)	18.2 (64.8)	38.8 (101.8)
Mean daily maximum °C (°F)	2.8 (37.0)	4.7 (40.5)	9.1 (48.4)	14.5 (58.1)	19.5 (67.1)	23.6 (74.5)	27.1 (80.8)	27.5 (81.5)	23.7 (74.7)	17.8 (64.0)	10.7 (51.3)	4.9 (40.8)	15.5 (59.9)
Daily mean °C (°F)	−1.3 (29.7)	−0.1 (31.8)	3.7 (38.7)	8.8 (47.8)	13.4 (56.1)	17.2 (63.0)	20.3 (68.5)	20.6 (69.1)	16.6 (61.9)	11.5 (52.7)	5.0 (41.0)	0.7 (33.3)	9.7 (49.5)
Mean daily minimum °C (°F)	−4.8 (23.4)	−4.1 (24.6)	−0.8 (30.6)	3.5 (38.3)	7.8 (46.0)	11.3 (52.3)	13.8 (56.8)	14.2 (57.6)	10.4 (50.7)	6.3 (43.3)	0.5 (32.9)	−2.6 (27.3)	4.6 (40.3)
Record low °C (°F)	−23.7 (−10.7)	−24.4 (−11.9)	−20.6 (−5.1)	−12.6 (9.3)	−3.0 (26.6)	−0.4 (31.3)	3.0 (37.4)	3.7 (38.7)	−2.4 (27.7)	−6.8 (19.8)	−18.5 (−1.3)	−20.2 (−4.4)	−24.4 (−11.9)
Average precipitation mm (inches)	66.4 (2.61)	58.1 (2.29)	70.7 (2.78)	58.4 (2.30)	68.8 (2.71)	47.1 (1.85)	12.8 (0.50)	16.9 (0.67)	22.0 (0.87)	40.4 (1.59)	57.4 (2.26)	76.7 (3.02)	595.7 (23.45)
Average precipitation days	13.93	13.33	13.93	13.27	13.9	10.2	3.2	2.83	4.67	8.23	8.63	13.7	119.82
Average relative humidity (%)	78.6	74.9	69.9	65.1	65.0	62.8	57.2	56.9	58.6	66.1	71.6	78.0	67.0
Mean monthly sunshine hours	95.2	117.4	156.2	194.4	242.9	282.7	328.0	317.0	249.4	194.2	143.8	86.8	2,408
Mean daily sunshine hours	3.1	4.3	5.1	6.5	7.9	9.6	10.7	10.4	8.5	6.4	4.9	2.9	6.7
Source 1: Turkish State Meteorological Service
Source 2: NOAA (humidity, sun 1991-2020)

== Sights ==
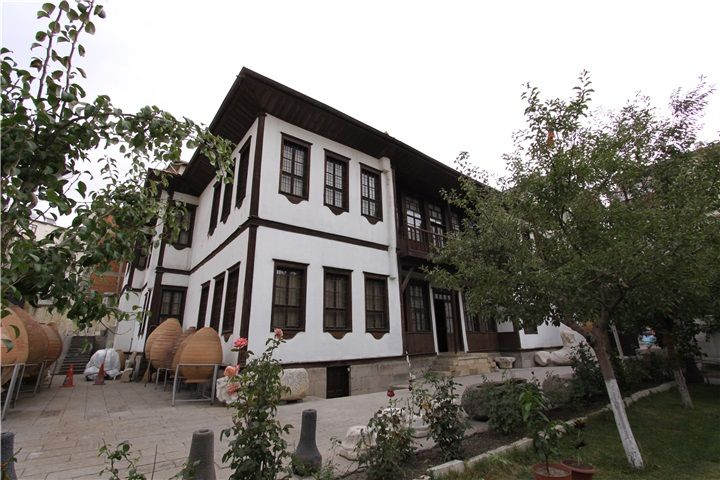
Yozgat Ethnography Museum

The main sights of the city of Yozgat are the Yozgat Clock Tower built in 1908 and the Çapanoğlu Mosque built by the Çapanoğlu family, who are the founders of Yozgat. Yozgat Pine Grove National Park is an area of 264 ha (2.64 km^{2}) in which different types of pine trees grow, some up to 500 years old.

== Transport ==
In 2008, the peripherous neighborhood of Divanlı was selected to become the site of the Yozgat YHT railway station, which would connect the city to the Ankara-Sivas high-speed railway. The station was eventually opened on 26 April 2023.

== Sport ==
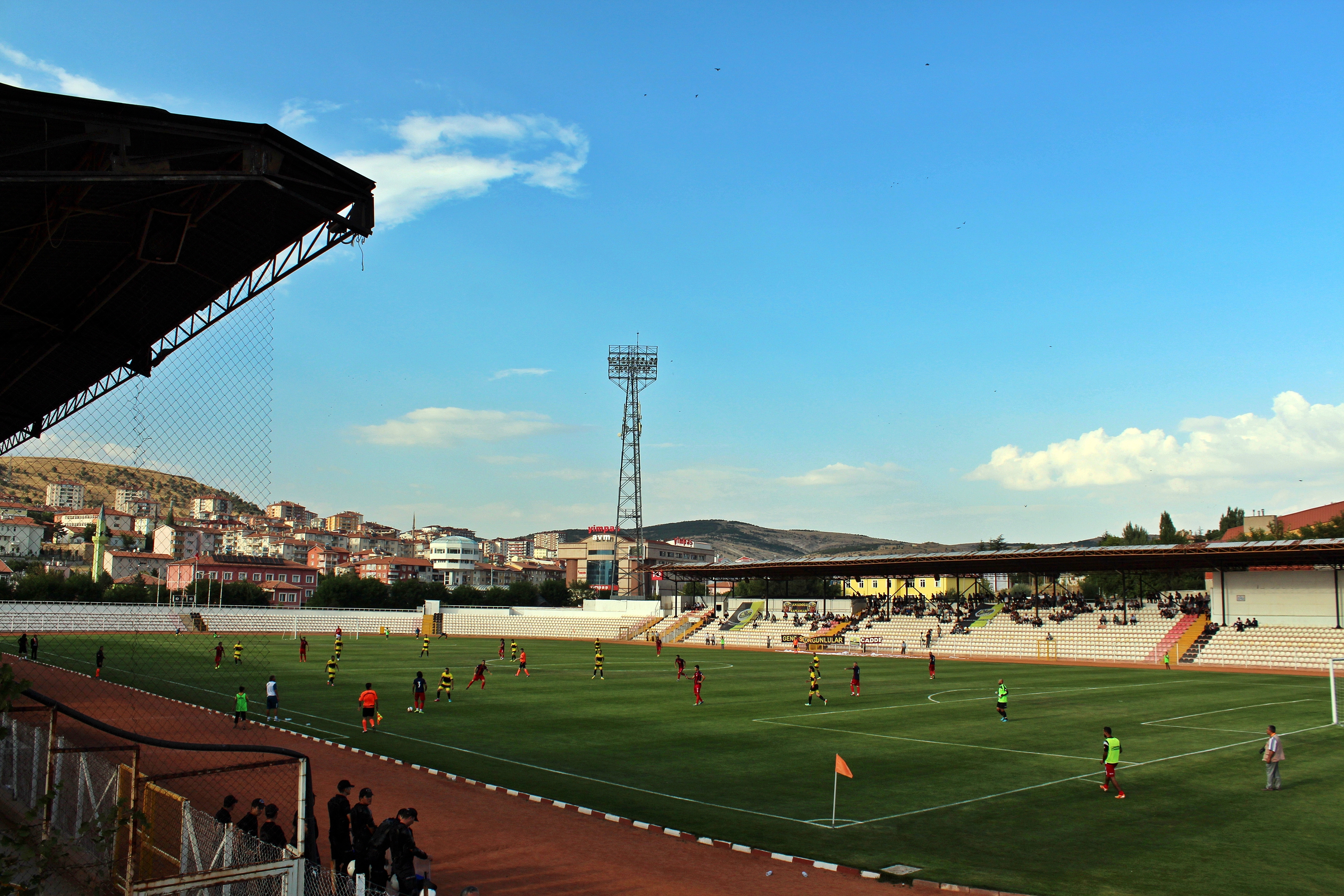
Bozok Stadium

The city's football team Yozgatspor plays in the Turkish Regional Amateur League.

== Notable people ==
- Agah Efendi (1832–1885), journalist, publisher of the first Turkish newspaper
- Nasuh Akar (1925–1984), Olympic gold medalist wrestler
- Celal Atik (1918–1979), Olympic gold medalist wrestler
- Bekir Bozdağ (1965), Deputy prime minister
- Cemil Çiçek (1946), Speaker of Turkish Grand National Assembly
- Aylin Daşdelen (1982), European champion female weightlifter
- John Ilhan (1965–2007), Turkish-Australian businessman
- Lütfullah Kayalar (1952), former Minister of Finance
- Soner Özbilen (1947), folk singer
- Bozoklu Mustafa Pasha (1693–1694), Ottoman Grand Vizier
- Yusuf Izzet Pasha (1876–1922), Ottoman and Turkish general
- Ahmet Şâhin (born 1935), writer
- Mehmet Topuz (1983), footballer
- Mehmet Nidâ Tüfekçi (1929–1993), folk singer
- Mehmet Yıldız (1981), footballer
- Nubar Ozanyan (1956–2017), Turkish-born Armenian communist
- Hayko Cepkin (1978), Rock Singer
- İhsan Oktay Anar (1960), Author
- Rıza Kayaalp (1989), wrestler

== Twin town ==
- Groß-Gerau , Germany
