= Yozgat District =

District of Yozgat Province, Turkey

- District
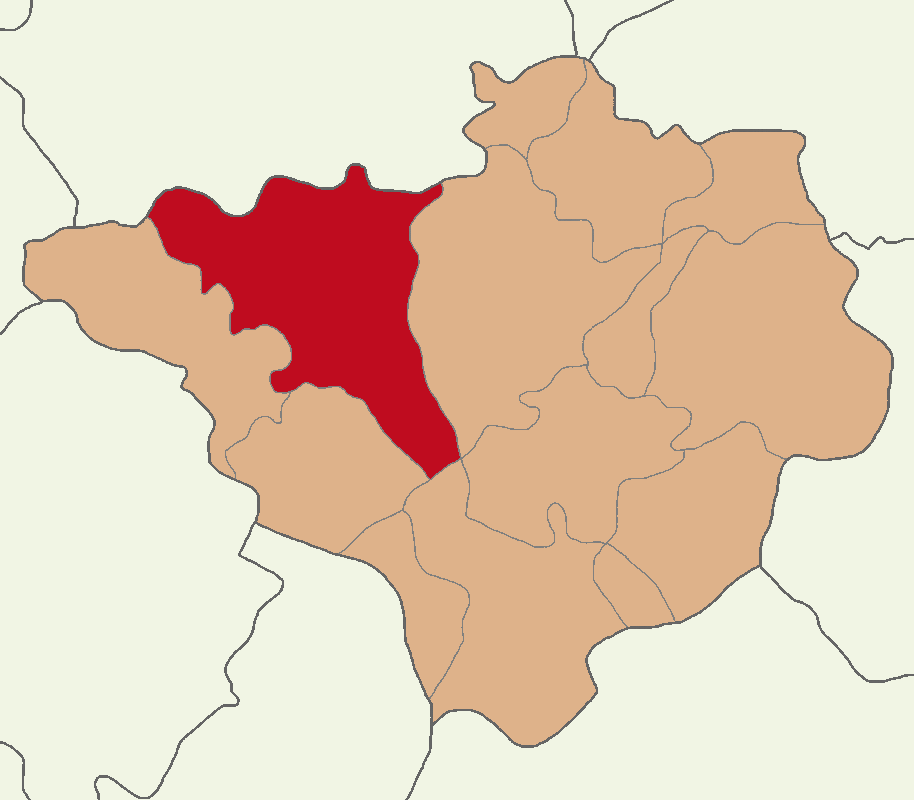
- Map showing Yozgat District in Yozgat Province

- Location in Turkey Yozgat District (Turkey Central Anatolia)
- Coordinates: 39°49′N 34°49′E
- Country: Turkey
- Province: Yozgat
- Seat: Yozgat
- Area: 2,024 km^{2} (781 sq mi)
- Population (2022): 109,197
  - Density: 54/km^{2} (140/sq mi)
- Time zone: UTC+3 (TRT)

Yozgat District (also: Merkez, meaning "central" in Turkish) is a district of the Yozgat Province of Turkey. Its seat is the city of Yozgat. Its area is 2,024 km^{2}, and its population is 109,197 (2022).

== Composition ==
There is one municipality in Yozgat District:

- Yozgat

There are 96 villages in Yozgat District:

- Aktaş
- Akyamaç
- Alemdar
- Aydoğan
- Azizli
- Bacılı
- Bahçecik
- Baltasarılar
- Başıbüyüklü
- Başınayayla
- Battal
- Bayatören
- Beyvelioğlu
- Bişek
- Bozlar
- Büyükincirli
- Büyükmahal
- Büyüknefes
- Buzağcıoğlu
- Çadırardıç
- Çağlayan
- Çalatlı
- Çalılı
- Çatma
- Cihanpaşa
- Çorak
- Dağyenicesi
- Dambasan
- Darıcı
- Dayılı
- Delihasanlı
- Derbent
- Dereboymul
- Derekışla
- Deremahal
- Deremumlu
- Erkekli
- Esenli
- Evci
- Fakıbeyli
- Gevrek
- Gökçekışla
- Güdülelmahacılı
- Güllük
- Güllüoluk
- Gülyayla
- Güneşli
- Hamzalı
- Haydarbeyli
- İnceçayır
- İşleğen
- Kababel
- Kaleköy
- Karabıyık
- Karacalar
- Karalar
- Kaşkışla
- Kavurgalı
- Kırıksoku
- Kırım
- Kışlaköy
- Kızıltepe
- Köçekkömü
- Köçeklioğlu
- Kolanlı
- Körpeli
- Köseyusuflu
- Koyunculu
- Kuşçu
- Kuyumcu
- Lökköy
- Mezraa
- Musabeyli
- Musabeyliboğazı
- Örencik
- Osmanpaşa
- Özlüce
- Pembecik
- Recepli
- Sağlık
- Salmanfakılı
- Sarıfatma
- Sarımbey
- Sarınınören
- Söğütyayla
- Tayfur
- Tayip
- Tekkeyenicesi
- Topaç
- Topçu
- Türkmen
- Türkmensarılar
- Yassıhüyük
- Yazpınarı
- Yeşilova
- Yudan
